= Contin Island =

Islet in Scotland

Eilean Chunndainn (Gaelic)

Location
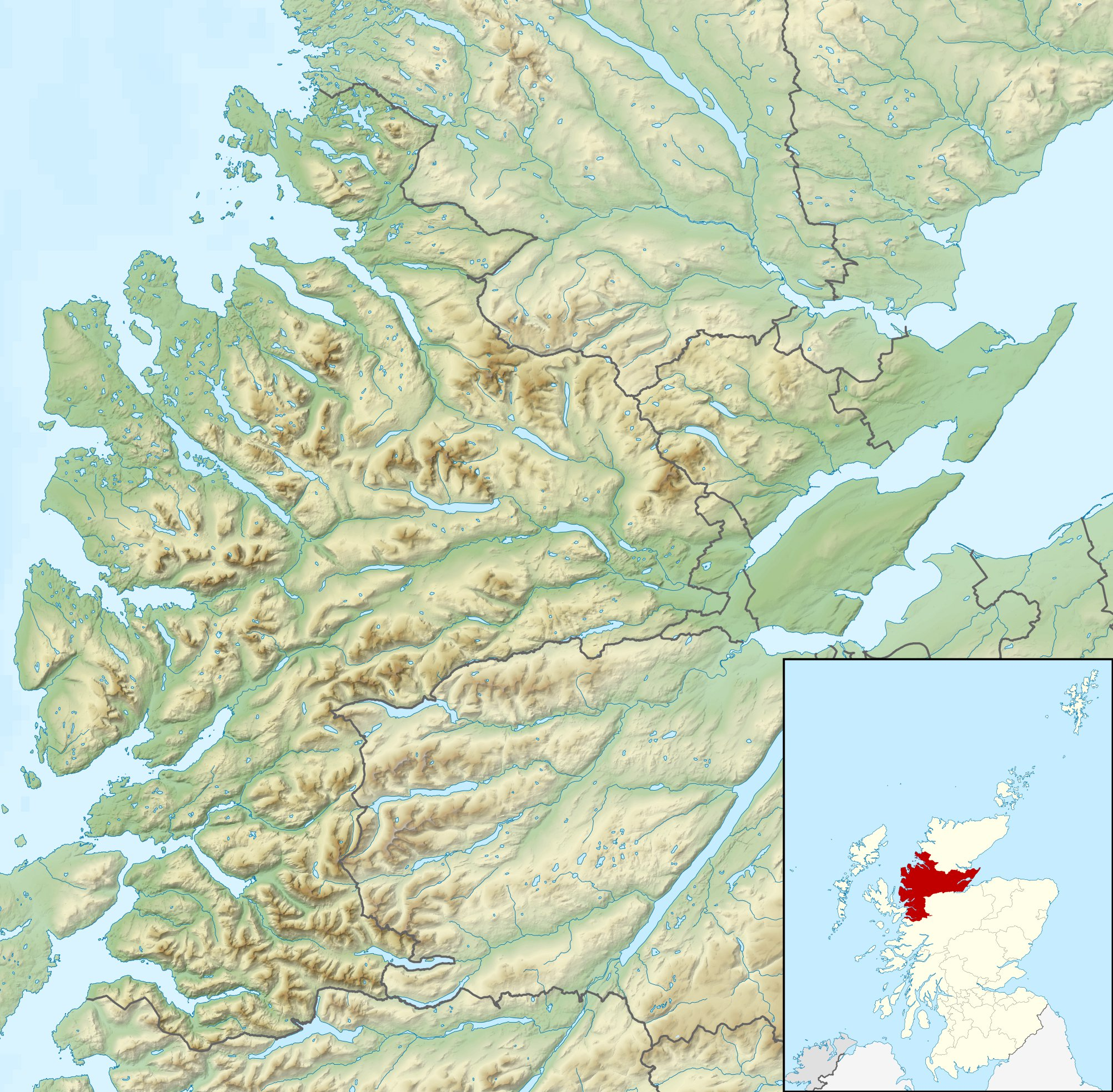
- Contin Island shown within Ross and Cromarty
- OS grid reference: NH457556
- Coordinates: 57.568°N 4.5738°W

Name
- Name meaning: island of Contin

Physical geography
- Island group: River Conon
- Area: c. 15 hectares (37 acres)
- Highest elevation: 20 m (66 ft) above sea level

Administration
- Council area: Highland
- Country: Scotland
- Sovereign state: United Kingdom

Demographics
- Population: approx 3 (2011)

Contin Island is an inhabited riverine islet in Ross and Cromarty within the Highland council area of Scotland. Located in the Black Water, a tributary of the River Conon, it is 2 kilometres (1.2 mi) downstream from Rogie Falls and is connected to the village of Contin by a road bridge and footbridge.

== Geography ==
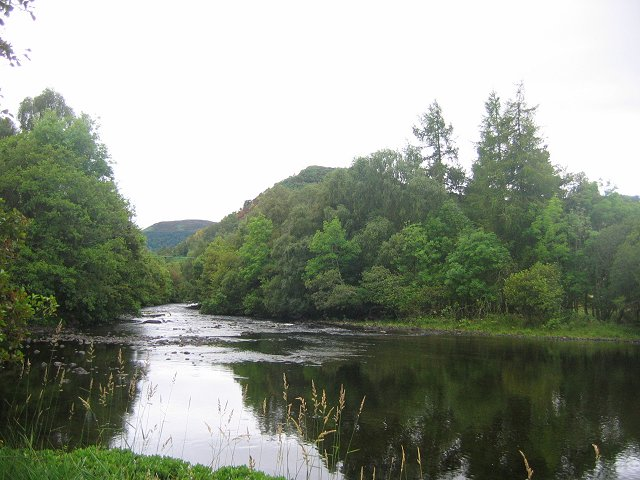
The wooded north end of Contin Island

The island is flat and lies between two arms of the Black Water. It is wooded at the northern and southern ends and at the centre is the parish church of Contin, dedicated to St Maelrubha or Máel Ruba and the old manse, surrounded by farm land. There has probably been a church on this site since the 7th or 8th century and there is a reference to it in 1227. The present church building dates from 1490, the former church having been burned by the MacDonalds sometime between 1482 and 1488. It was repaired and altered around 1832. There are two stones in the churchyard dating to about 1200.

The church is constructed of rubble walls with a slate roof, and the 19th century reconstruction followed the design of William Thomson. It has arched doors, windows with lattice glazing and a birdcage bell-cot on the west gable.

The manse, constructed in 1794 and enlarged in the 19th century, is located to the south of the church. It is now a private dwelling.

== Inhabitation ==
Although it is clear from photographic evidence that the island is inhabited, at least from time to time, it was not listed as such by the census in 2001. However, the manse is a family home.

== See also ==
- List of freshwater islands in Scotland

== Gallery ==
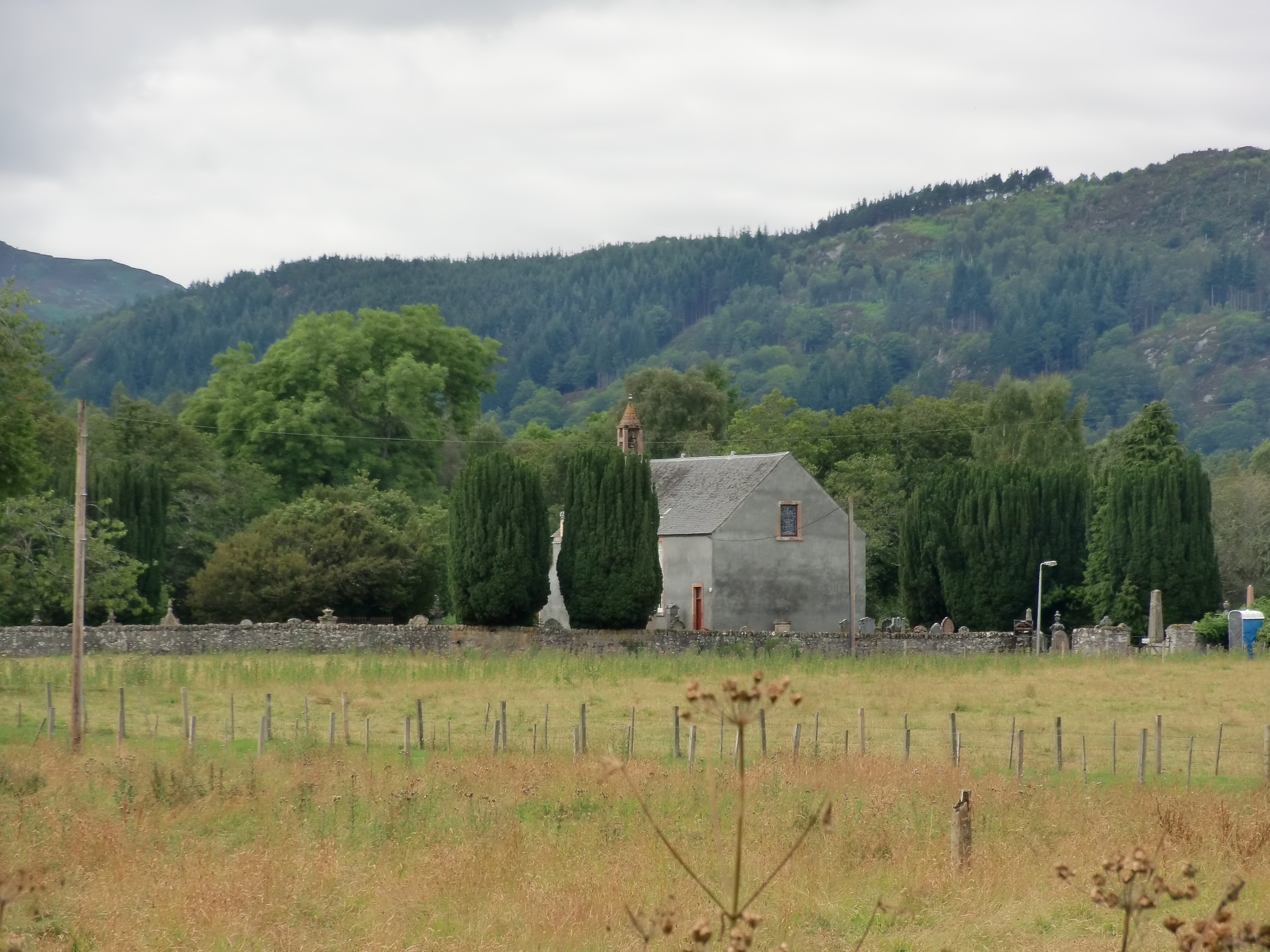
Contin Church

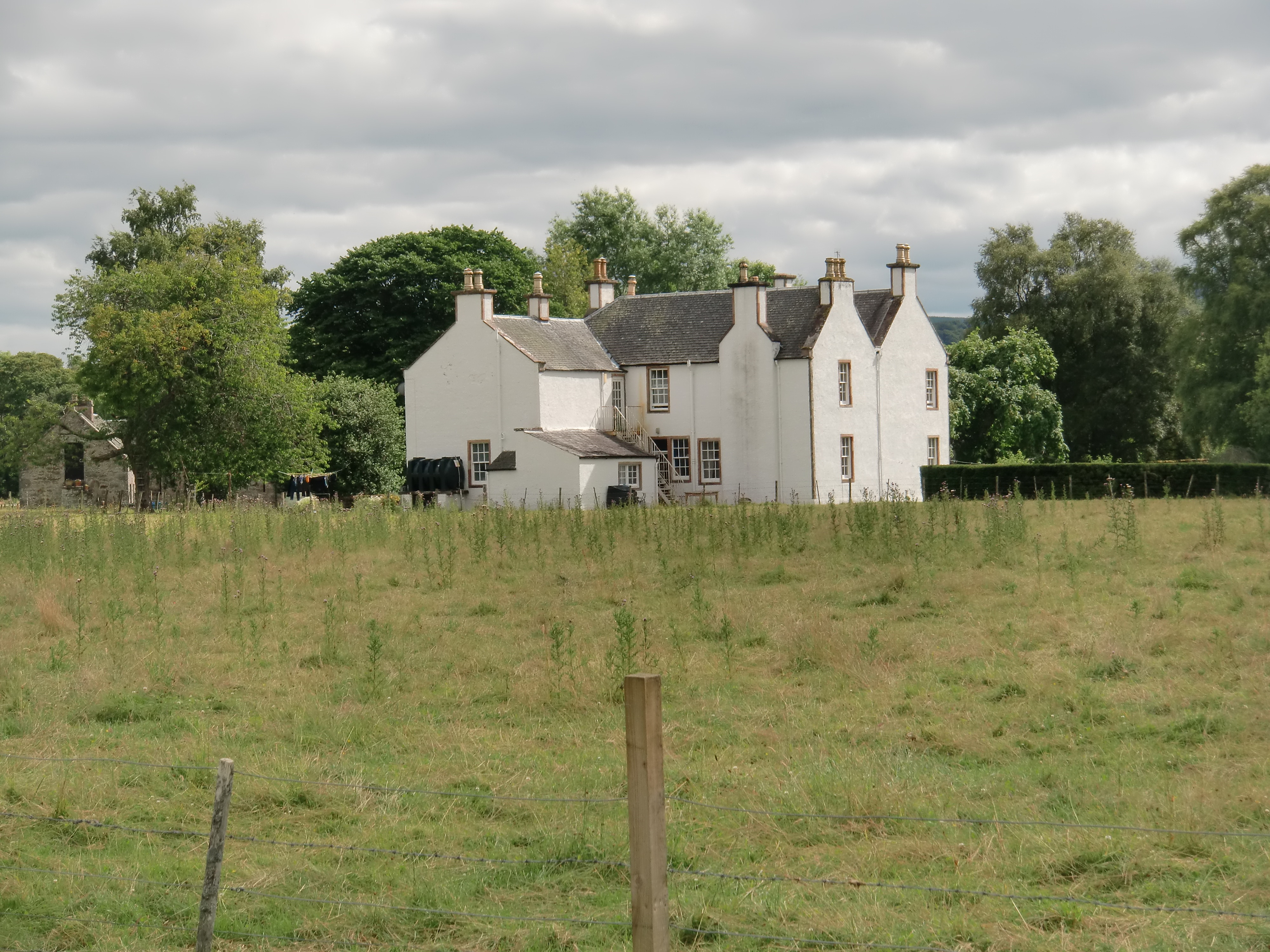
Contin Manse

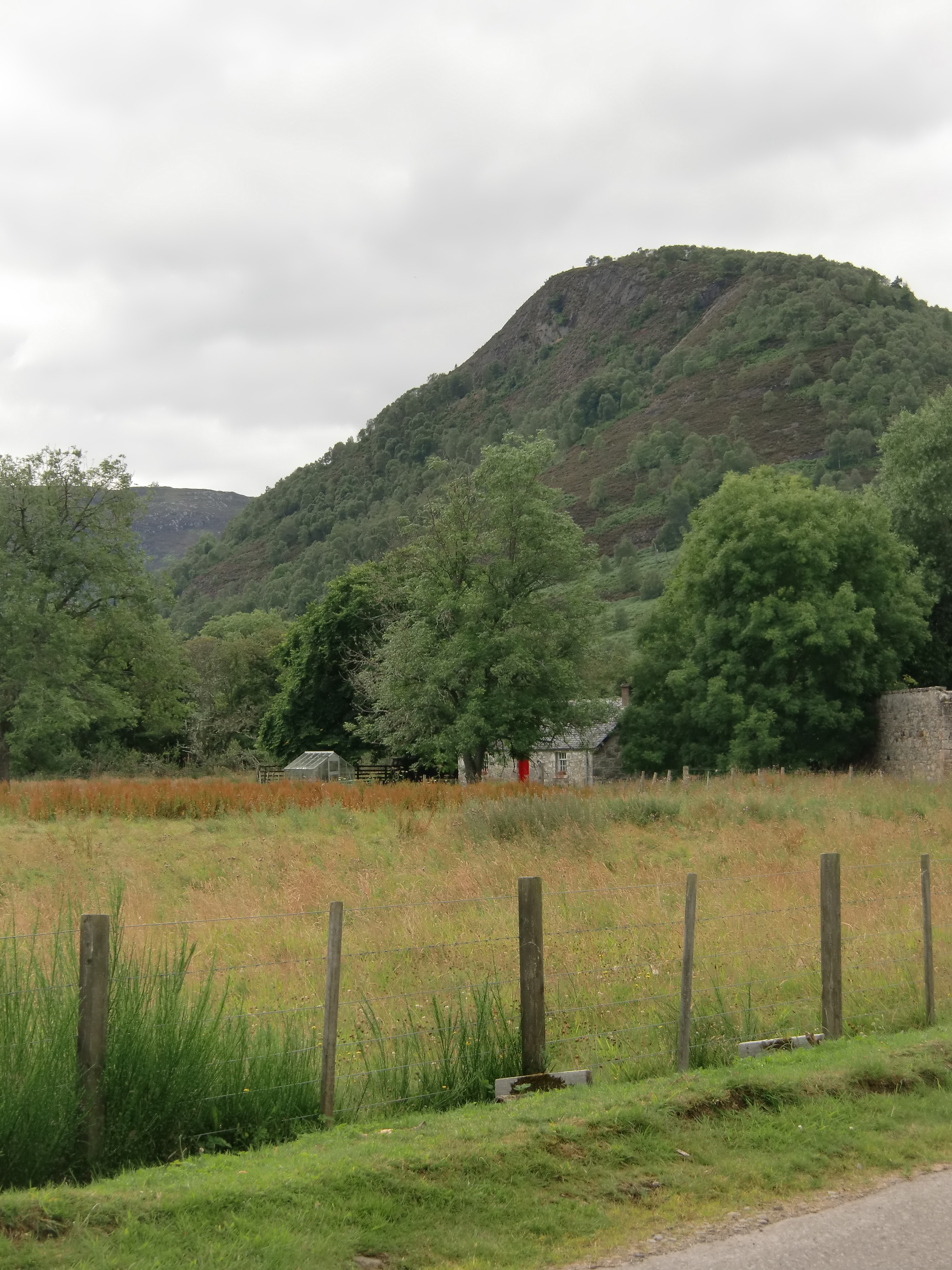
The heights of Torr Achilty from Contin Island
