= Loch Meig =

Lake in Ross-Shire, Scotland

- Scottish Gaelic: Loch Mìg
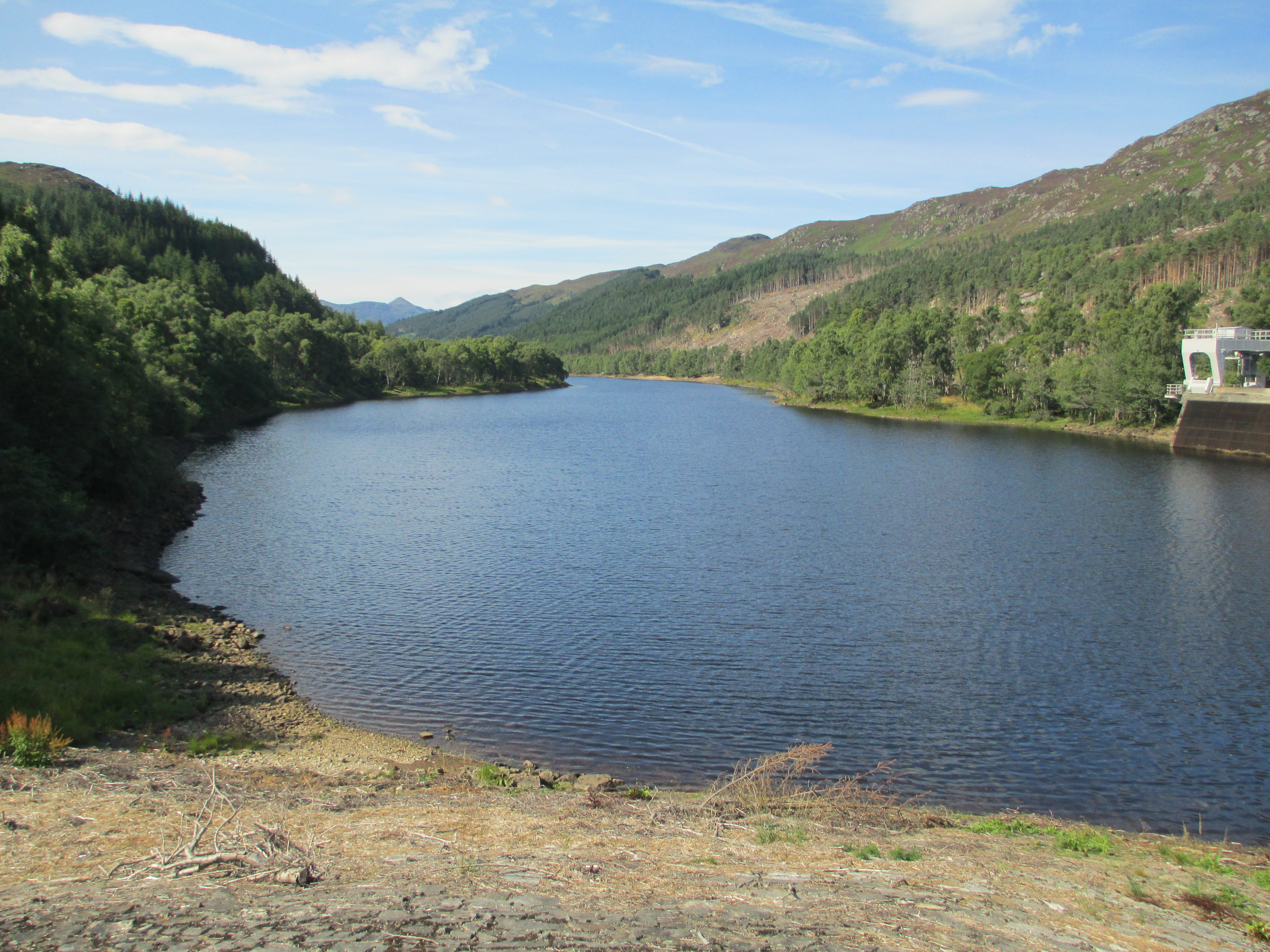
- The loch from its east shore, with Meig Dam on the right

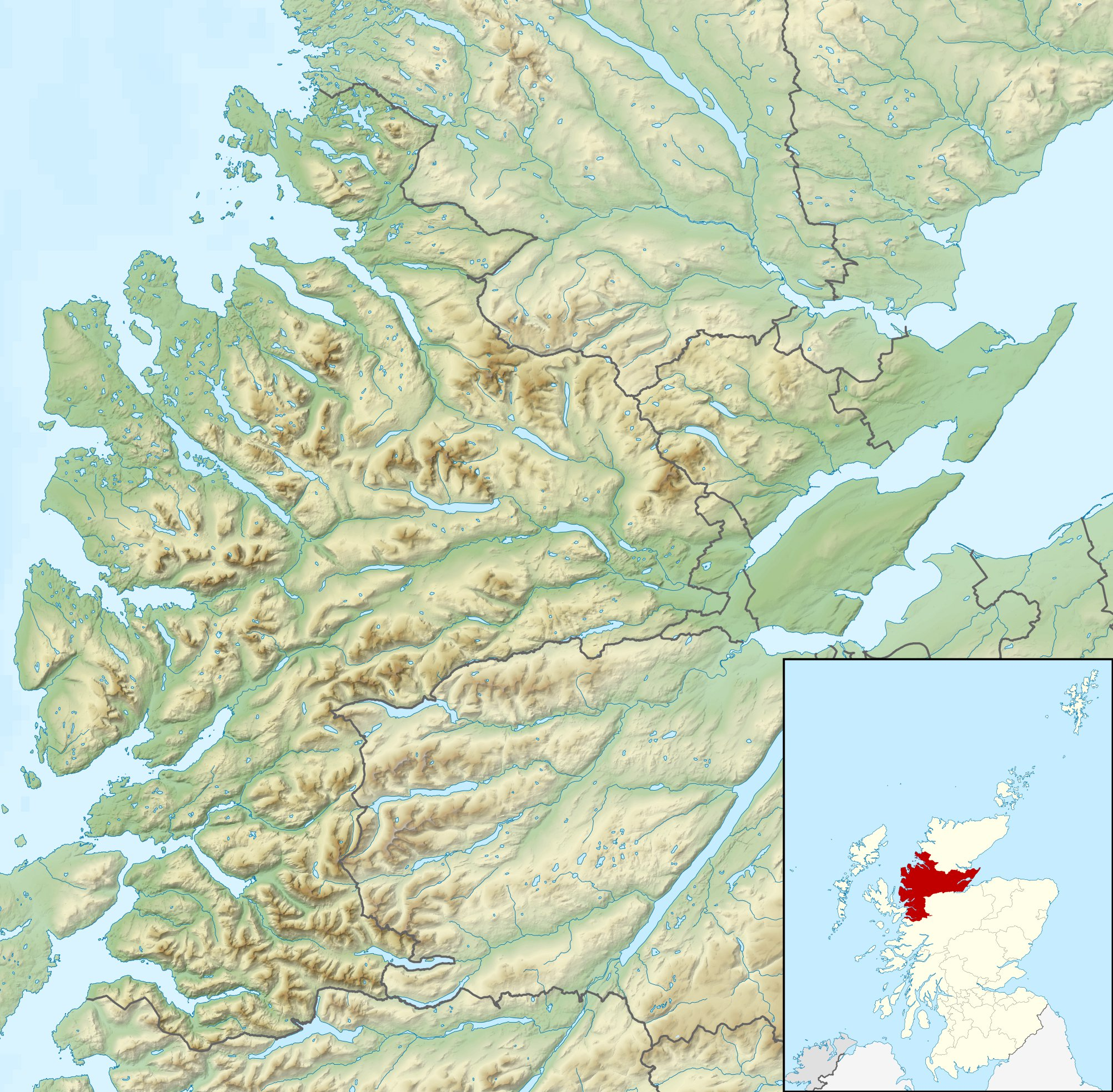
- Location within Ross and Cromarty
- Location: Easter Ross, Scotland
- Coordinates: 57°33′45.2″N 4°44′22.9″W
- Type: loch
- Primary inflows: River Meig
- Primary outflows: River Meig
- Basin countries: Scotland
- Max. length: 2.55 km (1.58 mi)
- Max. width: 0.386 km (0.240 mi)
- Surface area: 0.5 km^{2} (0.19 sq mi)
- Surface elevation: 85 m (279 ft)

Loch Meig (Scottish Gaelic: Loch Mìg) is a freshwater loch in Easter Ross, Scotland, 8.1 kilometres (5.0 mi) west of Contin.

Situated on the River Meig, the loch is a manmade reservoir formed from the construction of the Meig Dam in 1957. This was part of a series of post-war infrastructure projects led by the North of Scotland Hydro-Electric Board (NoSHEB). The reservoir is part of the Conon Hydro Scheme.

Loch Meig has large brown trout and perch populations, making it a popular choice for fly fishers. The local angling club has helped to boost trout stocks by introducing several hundred fish a year. The fishing season runs from 1 April to 30 September.

Today, the loch is mostly surrounded by timber plantations. However, several sites of historic interest sit on its north and south shores, including ruined farmsteads and sheepdips. The building of the Meig Dam caused many ruins to disappear underwater.

The name of the loch and its parent river derives from an Old Gaelic root, minc, with cognates in Latin, Old Welsh, and Old English. It roughly translates to "pouring forth".

Alongside Loch Achonachie and Loch Garve, Loch Meig was the site of a 2018 combined SEPA/University of Glasgow study on the behaviour and movement of salmon smolts through impounded lakes.

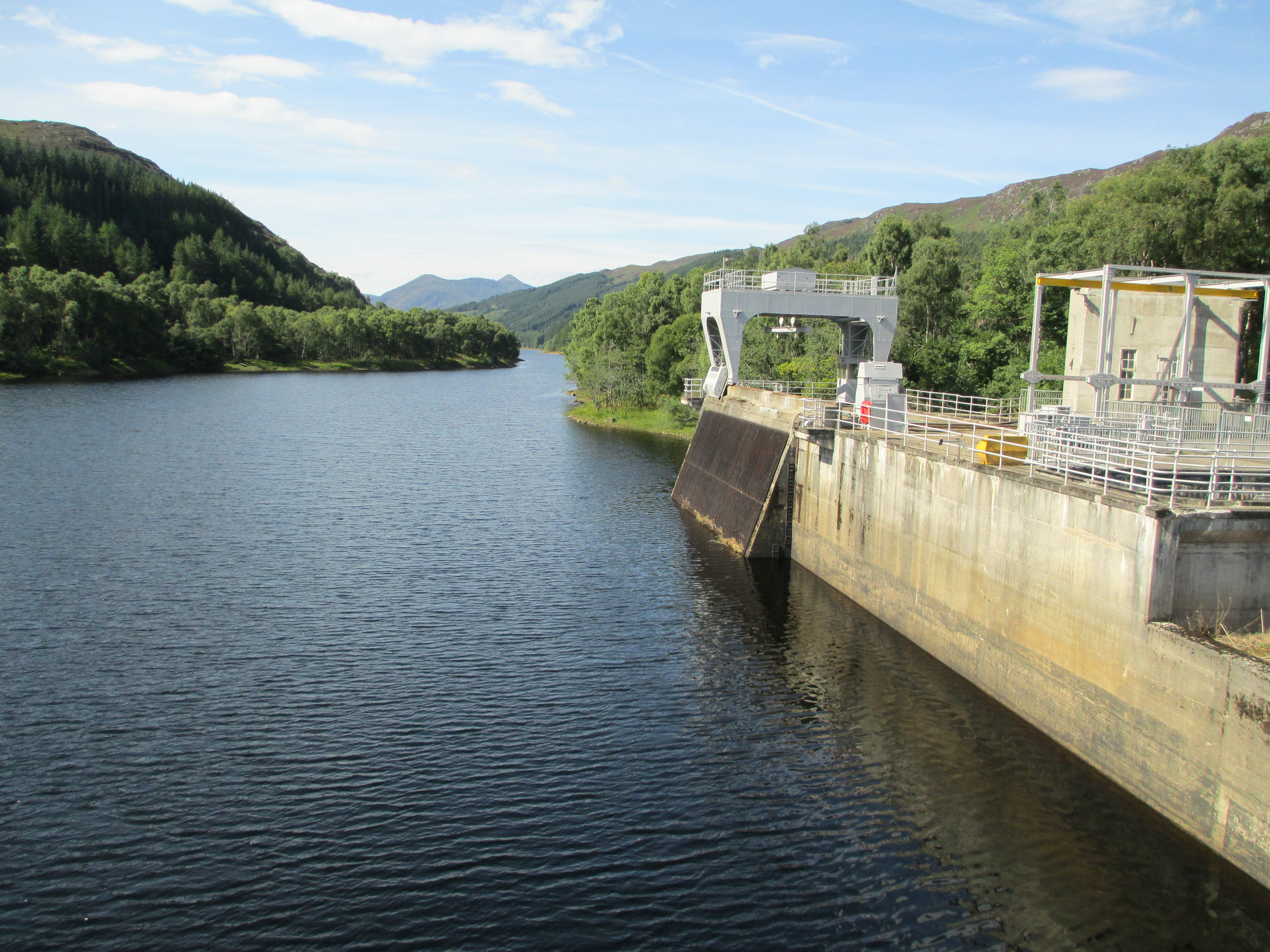
Meig Dam
