= Loch Achilty =

Loch in Ross-shire, Scotland

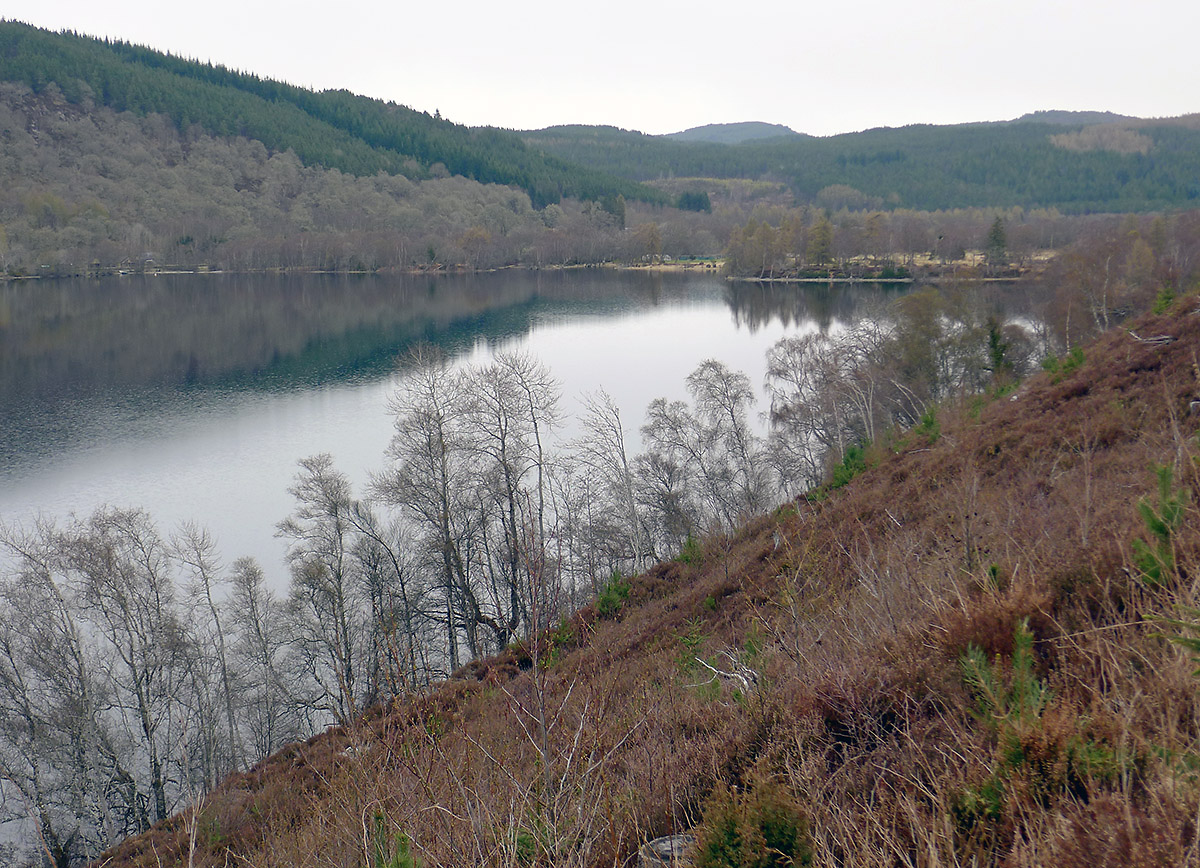
- Loch Achilty

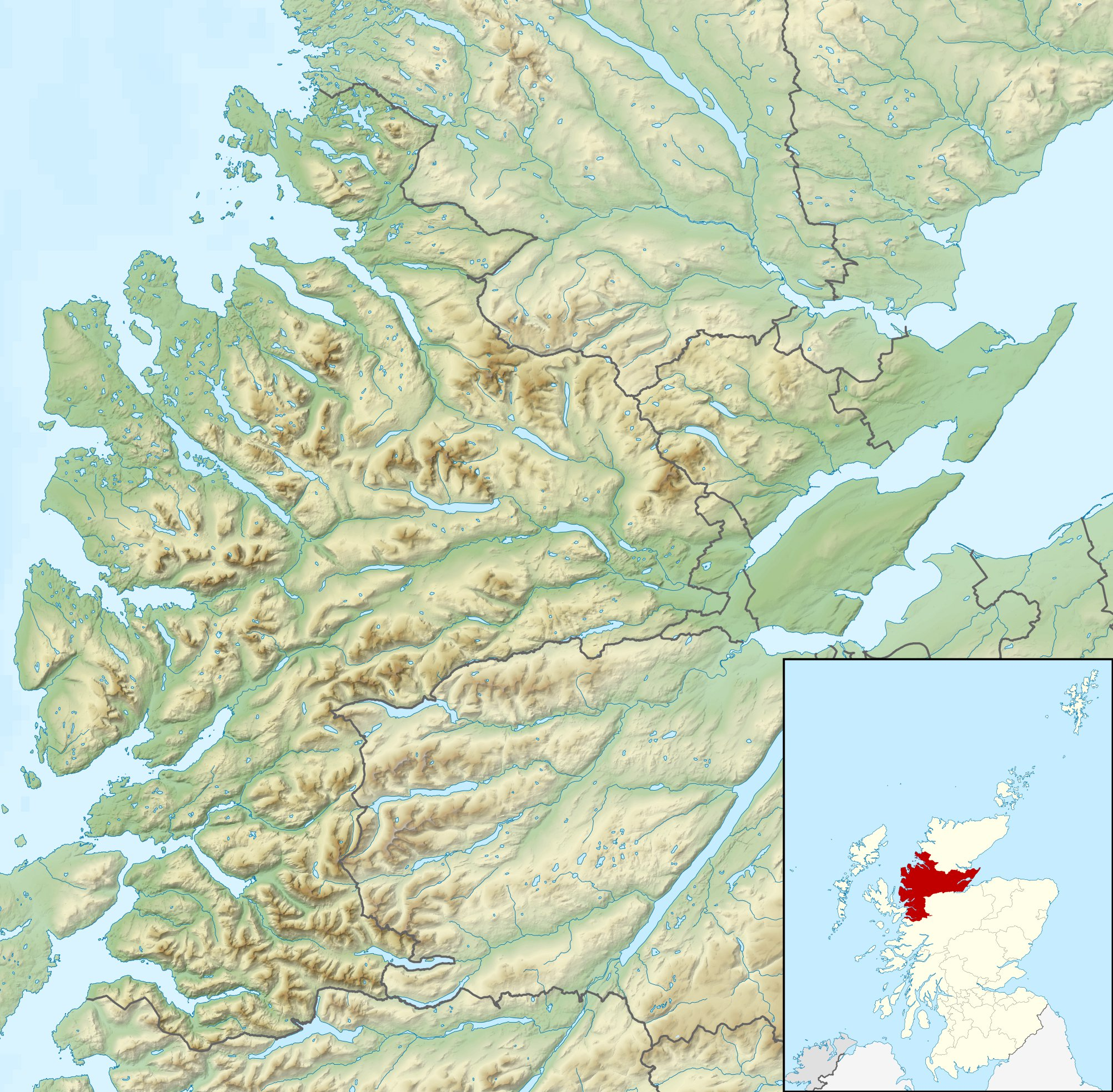
- Location within Ross and Cromarty
- Coordinates: 57.572700°N 4.621700°W
- Type: freshwater loch
- Max. length: 4,500 ft (1,400 m)
- Max. width: 1,350 ft (410 m)
- Surface area: 57.1 ha (141 acres)
- Average depth: 51.75 ft (15.77 m)
- Max. depth: 119 ft (36 m)
- Water volume: 332,000,000 cubic feet (9,400,000 m^{3})
- Shore length^{1}: 4.7 km (2.9 mi)
- Surface elevation: 37 m (121 ft)
- Islands: Three islands.
- ^{1} Shore length is not a well-defined measure.

Loch Achilty is a large deep picturesque lowland freshwater loch set within a sloping birch and oakwood forest, located near Contin in Easter Ross in the Scottish Highlands of Scotland. Loch Achilty is notable for having no outflow. It has been assumed that the loch discharges its surplus water via an underground tunnel into the River Rosay (now known as the Black Water) that eventually flows into the larger River Conon.

== Geography ==
Loch Achilty is a small but deep loch in Torrachilty wood, three miles west of Strathpeffer, and contains char. In outline it is somewhat elliptical, with the long axis trending north-east and south-west. The floor of Loch Achilty is irregular. The 10-foot (3 m) contour follows approximately the outline of the loch, in many places approaching very close to the shore, but the deeper contours are all sinuous in character, and there are two small basins exceeding 100 feet (30 m) in depth, the larger and deeper towards the western shore, and the smaller, based on a sounding of 112 feet (34 m), near the centre of the loch.
