= Achanalt =

Coordinates: 57.6105°N 4.9160°W

Achanalt: Scottish Gaelic: Achadh nan Allt
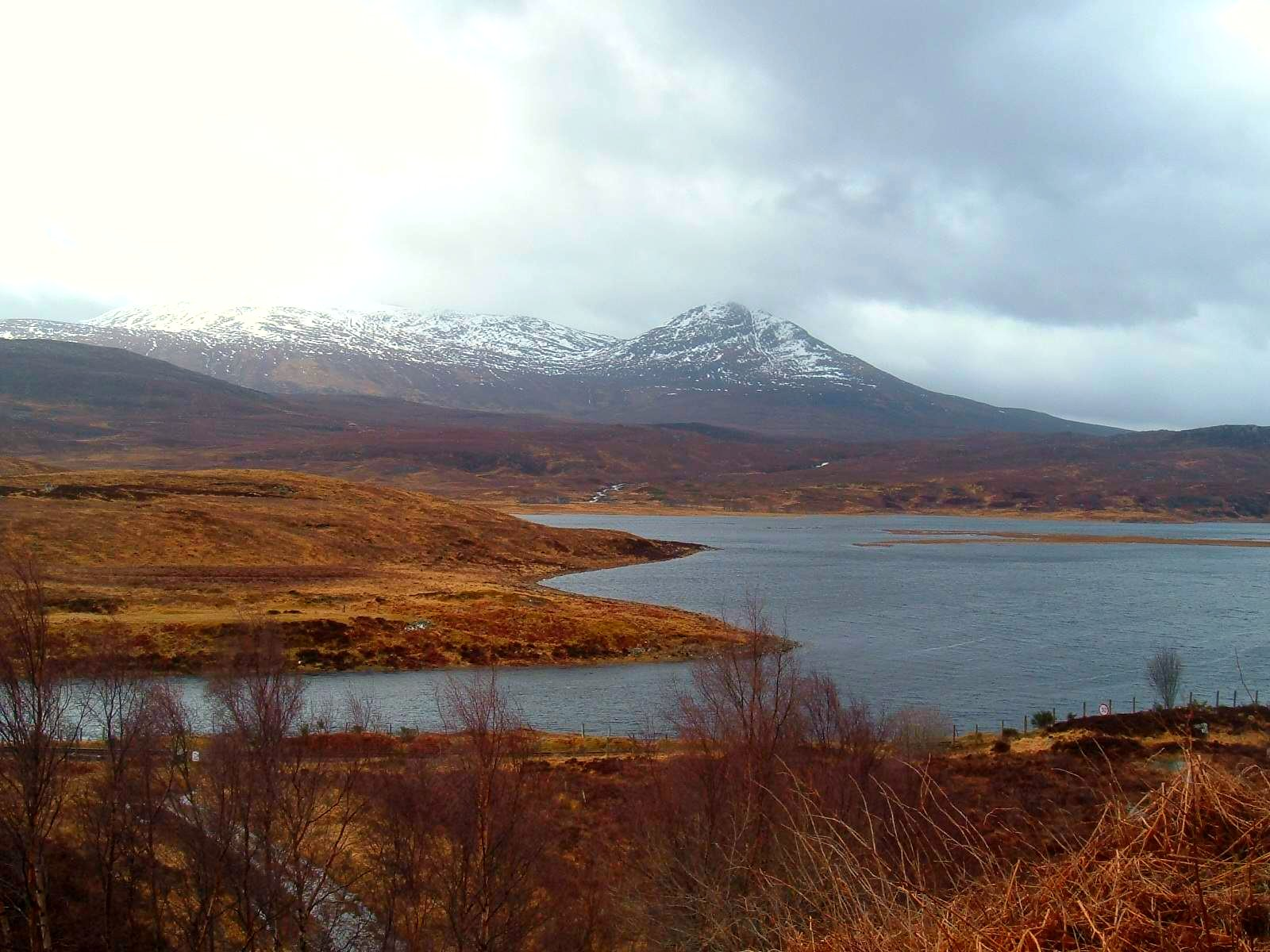
- Loch Achanalt

- Location within the Ross and Cromarty area
- OS grid reference: NH261615
- Council area: Highland
- Country: Scotland
- Sovereign state: United Kingdom
- Postcode district: IV23 2
- Police: Scotland
- Fire: Scottish
- Ambulance: Scottish
- UK Parliament: Caithness, Sutherland and Easter Ross
- Scottish Parliament: Caithness, Sutherland and Ross

Achanalt (Gaelic: Achadh nan Allt) is a railway halt in Strath Bran, Ross and Cromarty, in the Scottish council area of Highland. It is served by a railway station on the Kyle of Lochalsh Line from Inverness to Kyle of Lochalsh.

== History ==
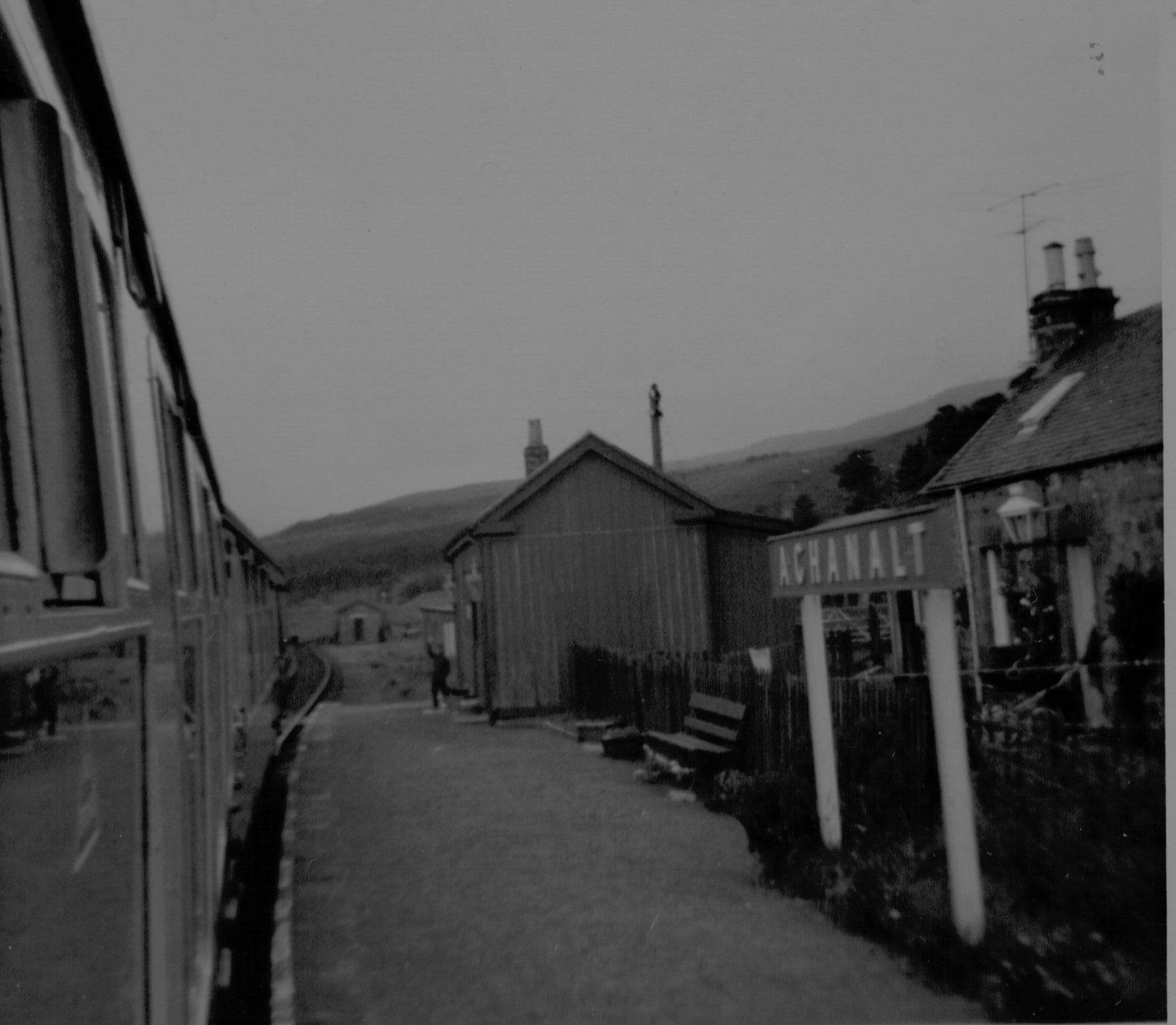
Achanalt in 1970

The Achanalt railway station was opened by the Dingwall and Skye Railway, but operated from the outset by the Highland Railway. Taken into the London, Midland and Scottish Railway during the Grouping of 1923, the line then passed on to the Scottish Region of British Railways on nationalisation in 1948. When Sectorisation was introduced, the station became part of ScotRail until the Privatisation of British Rail.

The Achanalt Power Station, commissioned in 1957 by James Shearer, lies less than 1 mile (1.5 kilometres) southwest of the Grudie Bridge Power Station.

== Culture ==
Sir Arthur Bignold, Member of Parliament (MP) for Wick Burghs in the early 20th century, was the proprietor of the Achanalt Inn (now Achanalt House), built in 1878. Bignold acquired the estates of Lochrosque and Strathbran, including the villages of Achanalt and Achnasheen, a castle at Lochrosque and lodges at Cabuie and Strathbran in 1885. Cabuie Lodge was lost below the waters of Loch Fannich in the 1950s and Lochrosque Castle has also been demolished. The estate at Strathbran including Achanalt passed to Bignold's grandson the Marquis de Torrehermosa and his family continue to live at Strathbran Lodge in Achanalt.

The steeply sloping Cnoc na Bhain burial ground, one of Scotland's most beautiful graveyards, contains a memorial and grave of the pioneer aviator, Captain Bertram Dickson.

== Geography ==
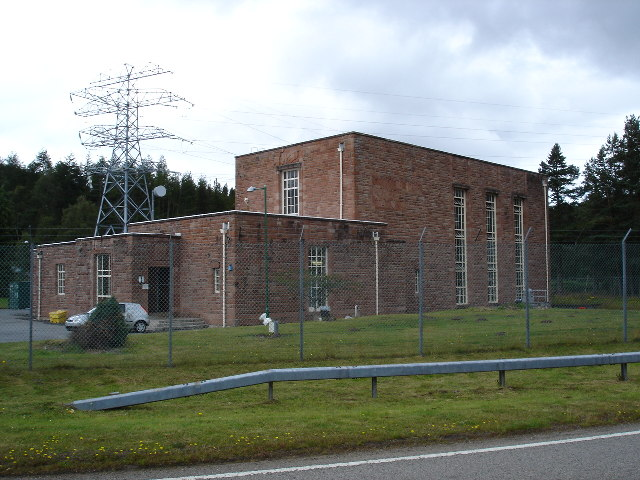
Grudie Bridge Power Station

The village lies on the A832 road and the River Bran, and is near to the western shore of Loch Achanalt. To the north is Loch Fannich. The terrain in the area is rugged and marshy, typical of this part of the Highlands. The dominant local geographical feature is Loch Achanalt, roughly quadrangular, with a maximum diameter of approximately 0.75 mi (1.21 km). Its water is shallow and reedy, and drains over 39 square miles (100 km^{2}), including the River Bran. The area between Achanalt and Achnasheen is characterised by a gentle slope down to the River Bran, and features two peaks, Scuir Vuillin and Scuir a Ghlas Leathaid 2,800 ft (850 m).

== Fauna and flora ==
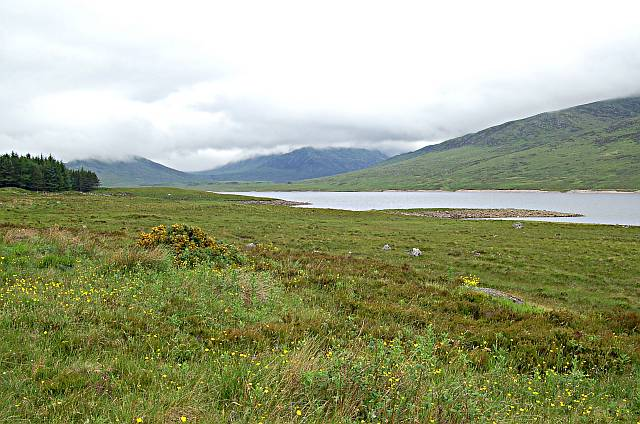
Looking towards the head of the loch

The Achanalt reservoir and marshes were designated a Site of Special Scientific Interest on 18 May 1989 as the area is an important nesting ground. It is 214.6 hectares (530 acres) in size. The marshes are characterised by mesotrophic grassland on a river valley flood plain. There are two waterlogged Carex Juncus communities that include bottle sedge, marsh pennywort, and bogbean. In a relatively drier area, short grass and sedge occur, mainly in winter. The marshes are sedge dominated, and these include common sedge, carnation sedge, flea sedge, and star sedge. Tawny sedge and dioecious sedge occur in flush line areas. The featured herbs include heath spotted orchid and common valerian. Purple moor grass and tufted hair grass are locally extensive. Four nationally rare species of breeding birds are located here.

The open water and grassland areas of Achanalt marshes support an array of nesting birds. Waders include common sandpiper, curlew, dunlin, lapwing, oystercatcher, redshank, ringed plover, and snipe. Wildfowl include mallard, red-breasted merganser, teal, tufted duck, and wigeon. There is also a black-headed gull colony.
