= Loch Achonachie =

Lake in Ross-Shire, Scotland

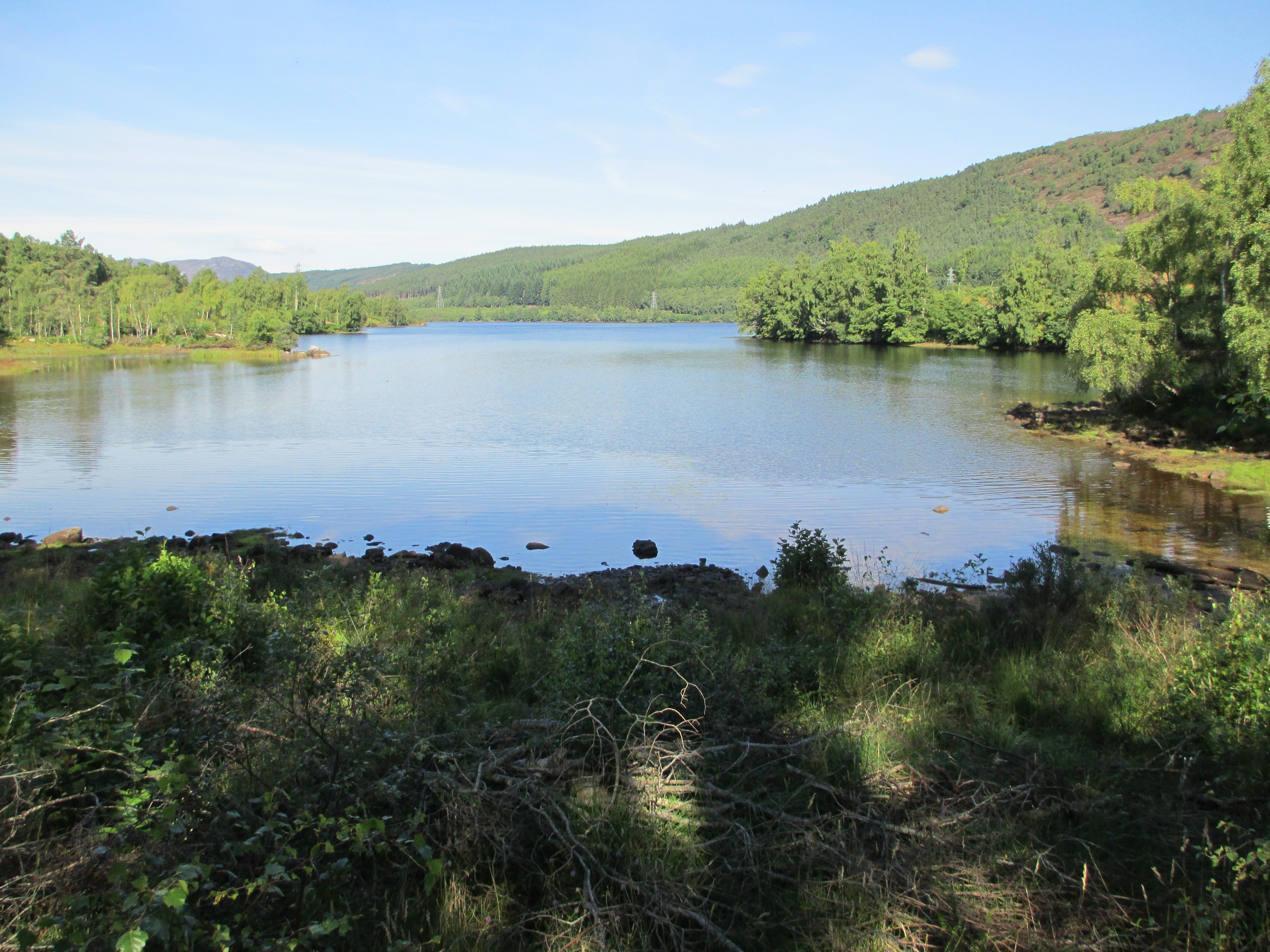
- The loch from its southeast shore.

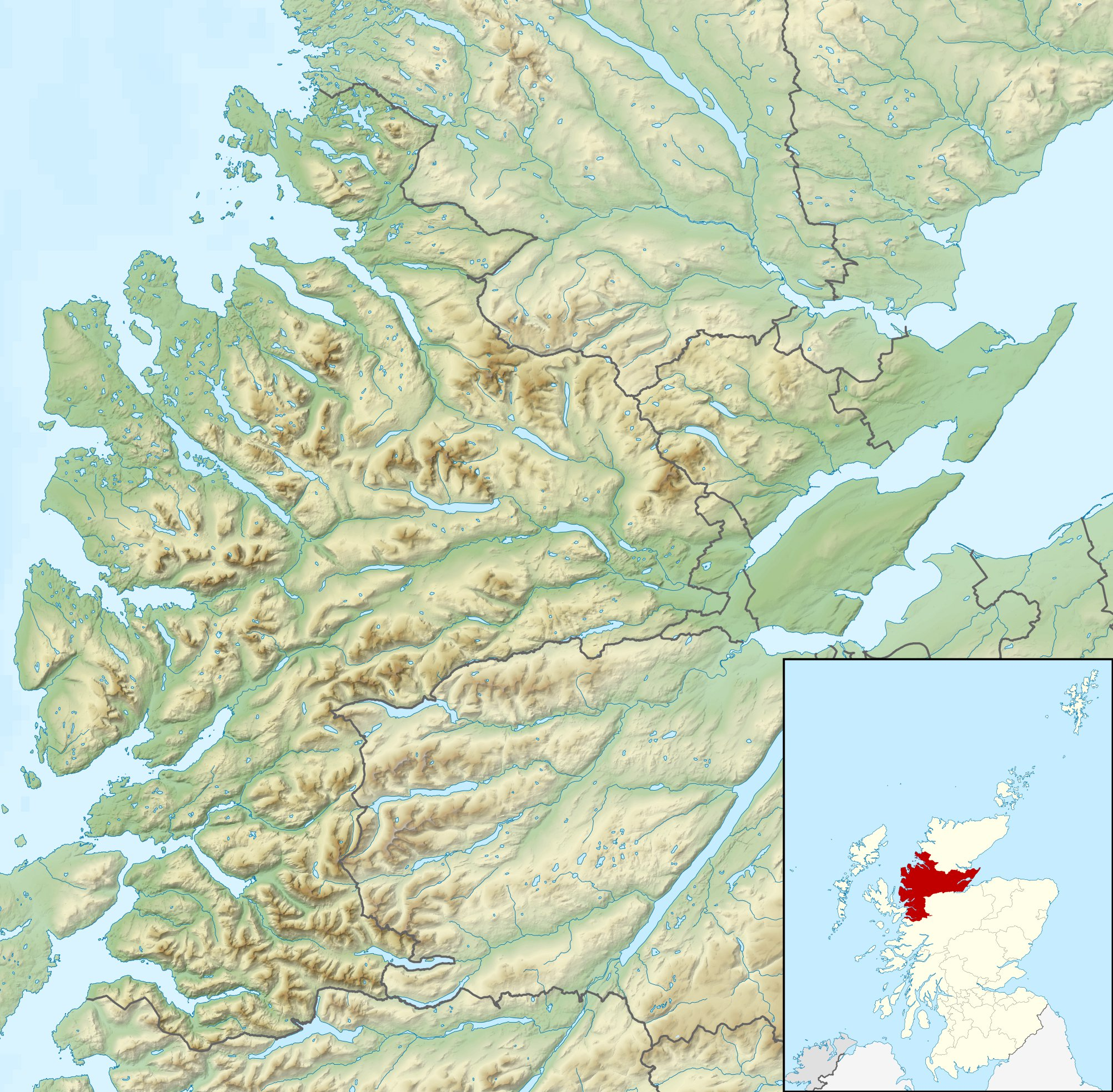
- Location within Ross and Cromarty
- Location: Easter Ross, Scotland
- Coordinates: 57°33′23.8″N 4°36′58.9″W
- Type: loch
- Primary inflows: River Conon
- Primary outflows: River Conon
- Basin countries: Scotland
- Max. length: 1.8 km (1.1 mi)
- Max. width: 0.529 km (0.329 mi)
- Surface elevation: 40 m (130 ft)
- Islands: 1

Loch Achonachie is a freshwater loch in Ross-Shire, Scotland, 1.9 kilometres (1.2 mi) south-west of Contin.

Situated on the River Conon, the loch is a manmade reservoir formed from the construction of the Torr Achilty hydroelectric dam in 1955, as part of the Conon Hydro Scheme. The dam acted as the control station for the entire Conon Valley Scheme, one of the major post-war infrastructure projects spearheaded by the North of Scotland Hydro-Electric Board (NoSHEB).

From the Ordinance Survey's website, a possible etymology for "Achonachie" may be the Gàidhlig elements ach (abbreviated from achadh) + aonach, meaning "Loch of the Hill Field".

Fairburn wind farm overlooks Loch Achonachie from the slopes of Beinn an Rubha Riabhaich, a hill on its south shore. The wind farm is privately owned by SSE.

Loch Achonachie is a popular location for local anglers due to its large trout and salmon populations. Fishing in the loch is controlled by the Loch Achonachie Angling Club, which contains over 300 members.

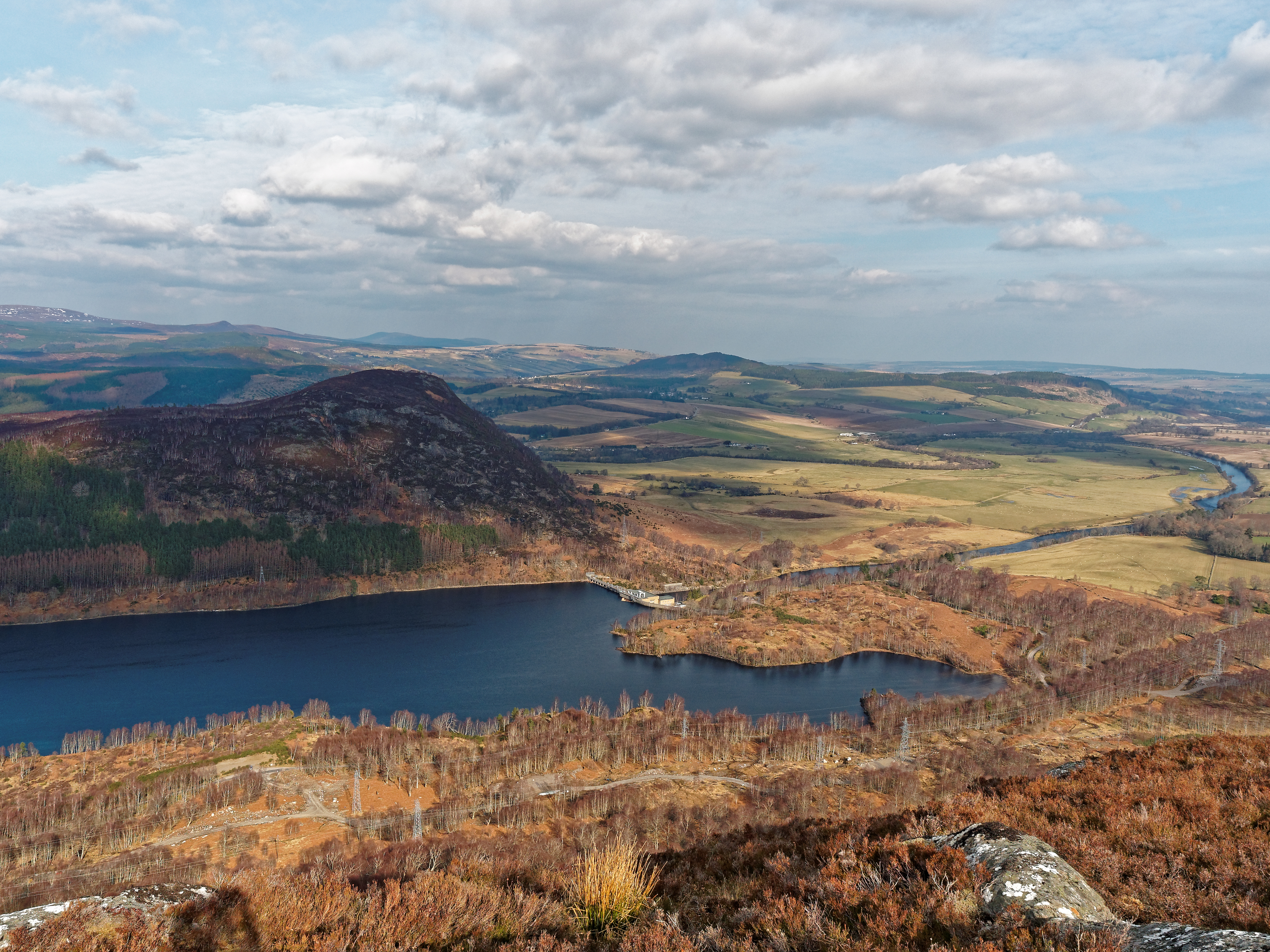
Loch Achonachie from the hillside on its south shore, with the hill Torr Achilty centre-left

The loch's salmon population has been the subject of several scientific studies, the most recent being in 2018. Alongside Loch Meig and Loch Garve, a combined SEPA/University of Glasgow study was conducted in Loch Achonachie on the behaviour and movement of salmon smolts through impounded lakes
