= Black Water (Conon) =

River in the Highlands of Scotland

Coordinates: 57.55791°N 4.54840°W

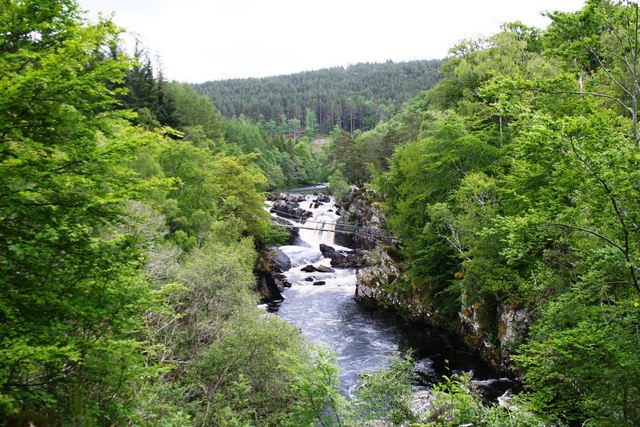
Rogie Falls

The Black Water (Scottish Gaelic: An t-Alltan Dubh) is a river in the Highlands of Scotland. It begins at the confluence of the Glascarnoch River with the Abhainn Srath a' Bhàthaich, near where it is crossed by the Black Bridge, carrying the A835 road. It flows in a south-easterly direction past the village of Garve, then passing through Loch Garve and Loch na Cròic, and around Eilean nan Daraich. It flows over Rogie Falls, then past Contin, around Contin Island, before flowing into the River Conon near Moy Bridge.

Flow in the river is reduced for the Conon Hydro Scheme, with water diverted from both main tributaries through Mossford Power Station.

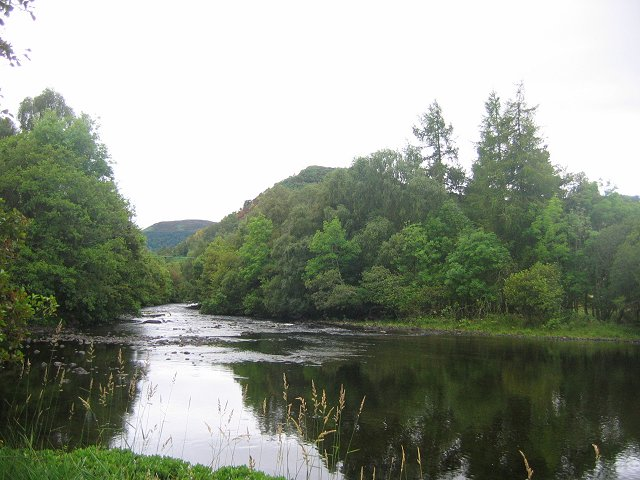
The river near Contin
