= Falls of Orrin =

Coordinates: 57.52943°N 4.56028°W

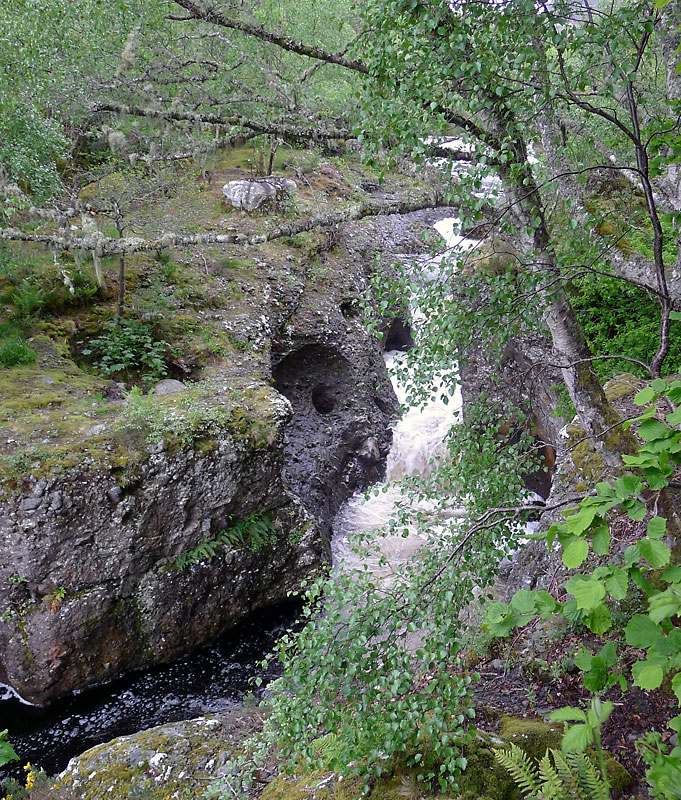
Falls of Orrin

Falls of Orrin is a waterfall on the River Orrin, in the Highlands of Scotland.

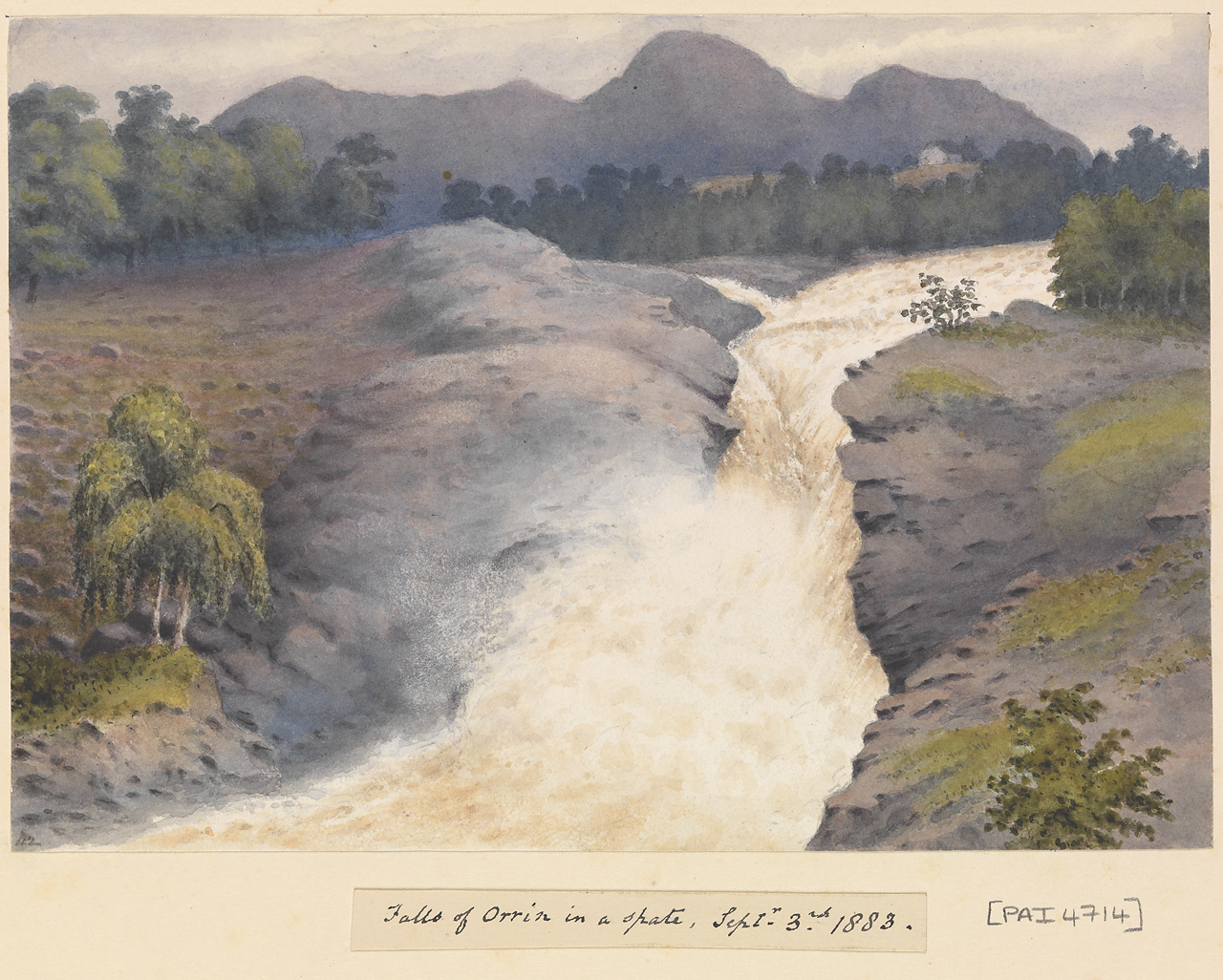
Painting of 'Falls of Orrin in a spate, Septr 3rd 1883', by Edward Fanshawe

== See also ==
- Waterfalls of Scotland
