= Conon Hydro Scheme =

Hydroelectric scheme in northwest Scotland

Coordinates: 57.554°N 4.598°W

The Conon Hydro Scheme, or Conon Valley Scheme, is a series of hydroelectric power stations located on the River Conon and tributaries in Scottish Highlands, between Inverness and Ullapool. The scheme was developed and built by the North of Scotland Hydro-Electric Board in three phases between 1946 and 1961. It is now operated by SSE Renewables.

The scheme contains six power stations at Achanalt, Grudie Bridge, Mossford, Luichart, Orrin, and Torr Achilty. They have a total capacity of 107.2 MW and an annual output of around 470 GWh (or million units per year). Water is impounded in eight reservoirs by nine large dams. There is also a complex series of nine tunnels and many aqueducts to divert the water to the power stations, some coming from other river basin catchments.

The first phase harnessed the catchment of Loch Fannich, diverting it through a tunnel to Grudie Bridge Power Station, which was constructed at the confluence of the River Guidie and River Bran, just upstream of Loch Luichart. Grudie Bridge started generating in 1950. Originally built without a dam on Loch Fannich, one was added five years later increasing the head and storage of the scheme.

The second phase comprised four power stations. Mossford, which takes water via tunnels from Loch Glascarnoch and Loch Vaich, both of which were created by damming tributaries of the Black Water. Achnalt, on the River Bran downstream of Loch Achnalt and Loch a' Chuillin. Luichart, downstream of Loch Luichart which is supplemented by water from Loch Meig. Torr Achilty, the lowest power station in the scheme located in a dam across the River Conon forming Loch Achonachie.

The third and final phase was to construct the Orrin Reservoir with two dams, plus a tunnel through the hillside to the power station on the shore of Loch Achonachie.

== Scheme description ==
The Conon Hydro Scheme six power stations and six major dams, plus several other lesser dams and weirs. These operate in a cascade, with almost the entire Conon catchment passing through the lowest scheme at Torr Achilty.

The reservoirs, with elevations above ordnance datum (AOD) for the six power stations are as follows (listed roughly north to south, upstream to downstream):

- Loch Droma (270 m) and Loch Vaich (256 m) both feed via tunnels into Loch Glascarnoch (252 m) which is then diverted through a tunnel to Mossford Power Station on the northern bank of Loch Luichart.
- Loch Fannich (256 m) feeds Grudie Bridge Power Station, which discharges into the River Grudie just upstream of its confluence with the River Bran.
- Loch Achnalt/Loch a' Chuillin (111 m) feed Achanalt Power Station, which discharges into the River Bran, a tributary of Loch Luichart.
- Water from Loch Meig (87 m) is diverted through a tunnel to Loch Luichart (85 m) and, together with water from the three stations above, this flows through Luichart Power Station, discharging back into the River Conon upstream of Loch Achonachie.
- Water from the Orrin Reservoir (256 m) is transferred by tunnel to the Orrin Power Station on the southern bank of Loch Achonachie.
- Finally, Loch Achonachie (30 m) is impounded by Torr Achilty Dam which includes the power station, discharging into the River Conon around 14 m above sea level and 12.5 km (7.8 mi) from the coast.

Power stations in the Conon Hydro Scheme
Station name	Capacity (MW)	Gross head (m)	Average annual output (GWh)	Year completed
Achanalt	3	20	7	1956
Grudie Bridge	18.6	168	87	1950
Mossford	18.6	161	121	1957
Luichart	34	56	135	1954
Orrin	18	222	80	1959
Torr Achilty	15	16	42	1954

Major dams in the Conon Hydro Scheme
Dam name	Dam construction	Year completed	Length (m)	Height (m)	Volume	Main contractor
Glascarnoch	Concrete gravity and earth fill	1957	534	43	186,000 cu yd (142,000 m^{3}) concrete 268,000 cu yd (205,000 m^{3}) earthfill	Reed & Malik Ltd
Vaich	Earth fill with concrete core	1957	257	37	35,000 cu yd (27,000 m^{3}) concrete 400,000 cu yd (310,000 m^{3}) earthfill	Reed & Malik Ltd
Luichart	Mass gravity	1954	219	24	48,000 cu yd (37,000 m^{3})	Reed & Malik Ltd
Meig	Concrete gravity, buttress and earth fill	1956	178	26	38,000 cu yd (29,000 m^{3}) concrete 10,000 cu yd (7,600 m^{3}) earthfill	Duncan Logan (Contractors) Ltd
Torr Achilty	Mass gravity	1953	246	23	48,000 cu yd (37,000 m^{3})	William Tawse
Orrin	Mass gravity	1959	312	51	233,000 cu yd (178,000 m^{3})	Duncan Logan (Contractors) Ltd

== Scheme development and construction ==
The Conon Valley was one of the early hydroelectric schemes implemented by the North of Scotland Hydro-Electric Board, although it was constructed in three phases between 1946 and 1961. After the board was created in 1943, Edward MacColl the chief executive produced a list of 102 projects which he thought could be built, from small ones to huge ones involving several neighbouring glens. The initial scheme for the Conon Valley involved using water from Loch Fannich, which would flow through a tunnel to Grudie Bridge power station on the banks of the River Bran just before it entered the western end of Loch Luichart. When the board promoted their second scheme, that at Tummel-Garry, members in the House of Commons attempted to get the findings of the tribunal which had considered objections to it overturned, but this was defeated. In the House of Lords, Lord Kinnaird wanted to introduce a similar motion, but was persuaded not to. However, he introduced a debate to consider the future of the board, at which various members of the house suggested that hydroelectric power was not needed in Scotland, as it would soon be replaced by nuclear power. Lord Kinnaird did not succeed, and during the debate Lord Westwood, the leader of the house, announced that all objections to the Fannich scheme had been withdrawn following discussions between the board and the objectors. It thus became the board's third project when it was authorised in late 1945.

=== First phase: Gruidie Bridge power station and Loch Fannich ===
The project involved the construction of several aqueducts and tunnels, to divert additional flow into Loch Fannich. To the west of Loch Fannich, the Allt a' Choin Idhir and Allt Dearg are diverted via a low-pressure concrete pipeline approximately 3 miles (4.8 km) long that discharges into the reservoir to the north of the dam. The burns and river on northern slopes of Fionn Bheinn, including Allt a' Chlaiginn are also diverted via a similar pipeline 4.1 miles (6.6 km) long that discharges into the Allt na Mòine a short distance from the southern shore. This water would otherwise have flowed to the River Ewe on the west coast.

The main tunnel is around 3 miles (4.8 km) long. This sloping tunnel was constructed from a point above the site of the power station to a point around 90 feet (27 m) below Loch Fannich. From there it was driven beneath the loch until there was only 25 feet (7.6 m) of rock between the excavation and the water. Rock was carefully removed from the top of the tunnel to reduce the thickness to 15 feet (4.6 m), and a large sump was excavated, into which the final plug of rock would settle when it was blasted away. Two temporary concrete bulkheads and one steel bulkhead were constructed in the tunnel, to protect the tunnel and to ensure that debris from the rock plug would not be washed downstream. The final blast, which became known as "operation bathplug", was successful, and was the second time that such a technique had been used in Britain. Balfour Beatty carried out the work, and had also been responsible for the first use of this technique, at Loch Treig for the Lochaber hydroelectric scheme.

The surface of the loch was around 820 feet (250 m) AOD, while the surface of Loch Luichart is 289 feet (88 m) AOD. No dam was initially built at Loch Fannich, as the water level could be drawn down by up to 50 feet (15 m), but five years later a dam was constructed, raising the surface level to 840 feet (260 m) AOD. At the lower end of the tunnel, water is conveyed to Grudie Bridge power station by a steel pipeline which is above ground. It is 8 feet (2.4 m) in diameter, but as it progresses downhill, the internal diameter reduces, and the walls get thicker. Close to the power station, it splits into two feeds, each of which supplies a vertical-shaft Francis turbine, originally rated at 12 MW. This was one of the last projects to use a surface pipeline, as the board were keen to reduce the visual impact of their schemes subsequently.

The power station building is clad in red Tarradale sandstone and was designed by the architect James Shearer of Dunfermline. Shearer had previously worked on other schemes, including the first to be commissioned at Nostie Bridge and had approached MacColl with the suggestion that the power station should be built of stone, to blend in with the surrounding architecture. MacColl readily agreed, but when it came to designing the structure at Grudie Bridge, he felt that construction in stone would be too slow and cost too much, and so prepared sketches for a concrete, steel and glass building. MacColl asked if Shearer had seen concrete buildings after they had been exposed to the Scottish weather for 20 years, and when Shearer admitted that he had not, MacColl organised a weekend visiting buildings to see how concrete weathered. As a result, the use of local stone to face large concrete buildings became a policy within the Board, and Grudie Bridge power station was redesigned as a consequence.

=== Second phase ===
The second phase of the scheme involved building four power stations and six reservoirs, with preliminary work commencing in 1951.

==== Mossford power station, Loch Vaich and Glascarnoch ====
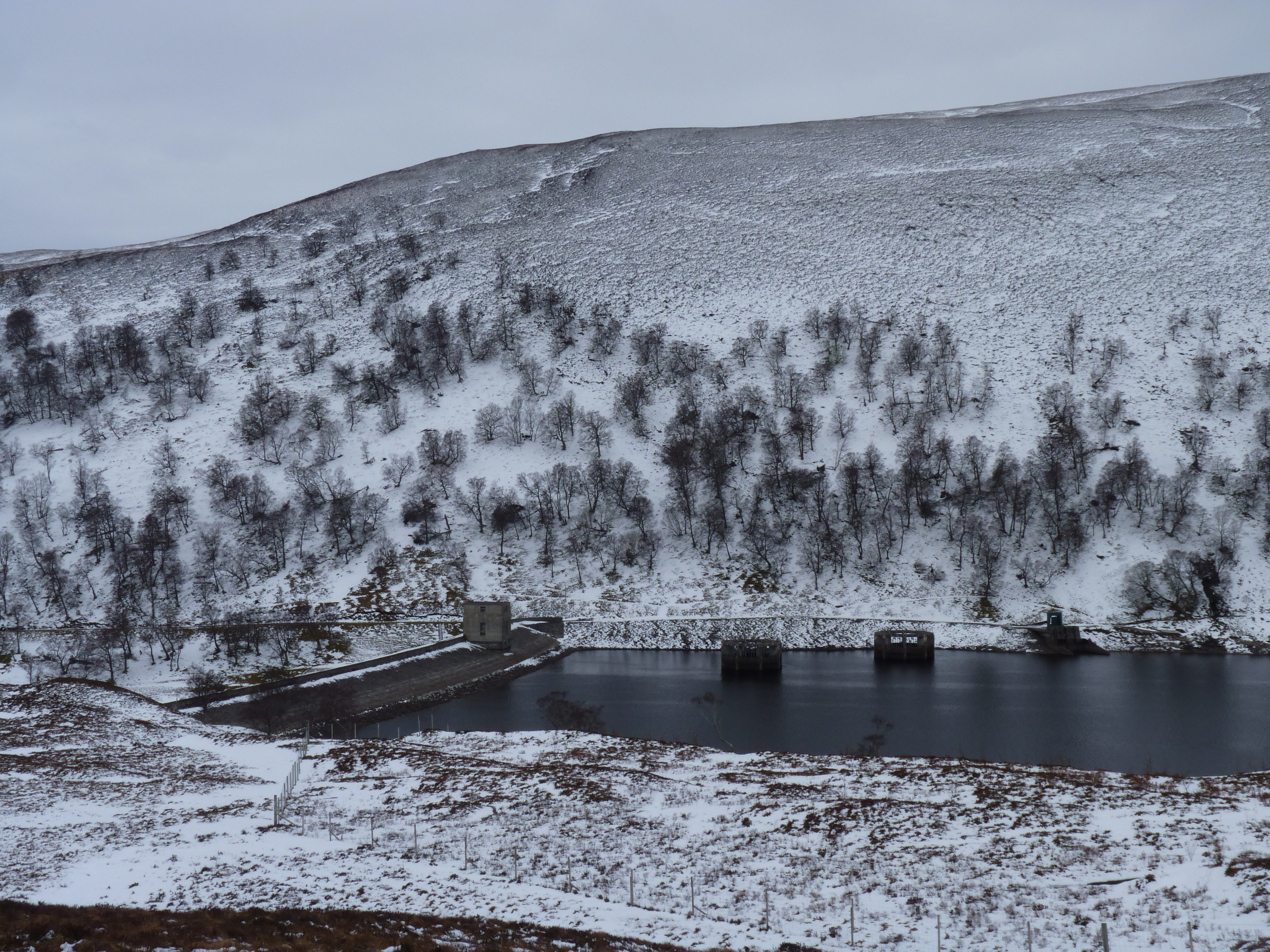
The dam forming Loch Vaich, with the two spillway towers and tunnel inlet works to the right

To provide water for Mossford Power Station required damming the River Vaich (Abhainn Srath a' Bhàthaich) to form Loch Vaich and the Glascarnoch River to form Loch Glascarnoch, above the point at which the two rivers became the Black Water. To reduce the amount of cement used, the Glascarnoch dam consisted of a concrete gravity dam with earth fill. It was constructed by Reed and Mallik and was 1,753 feet (534 m) long, with a maximum height of 141 feet (43 m). The Vaich dam was smaller, at 843 feet (257 m) long and 123 feet (37 m) high, and was built by the same contractor.

The Vaich dam is of unusual construction for Scotland, with a rubble construction on both sides of a vertical concrete core wall. The upstream face is coursed random rubble and the downstream face is covered with turf. As this facing would erode if the dam overtopped, two spillway towers were constructed in the reservoir. These connect to a pipe through the base of the dam, safely discharging water downstream when the reservoir level is high. The rubble for the dam came from spoil from nearby tunnelling work. This innovative construction, designed by Williamson and Partners, minimised the need for concrete and significantly reduced the time and effort to build the dam.

A tunnel feeds water from Loch Vaich into Loch Glascarnoch. The surface level of Loch Vaich is 840 feet (260 m) AOD, while that of Loch Glascarnoch is 827 feet (252 m) AOD. Initially, there was no power generated at the outflow, but a 320 kW turbine was added later. A second tunnel, 4.5-mile (7.2 km) long from just above the Glascarnoch dam feeds water to Mossford power station, on the bank of Loch Luichart.

The catchments of these reservoirs are again augmented by several small dams and aqueducts. To the east of Loch Vaich, four tributaries of the Abhainn Srath Rainich which would flow into the Black Water downstream are diverted via a pipeline and tunnel to Loch Vaich. To the north, the Abhainn a' Ghlinne Bhig is diverted south through a 1.1 mi (1.8 km) tunnel to the Allt Toll nam Muc, and the western slopes of Carn Crom-loch are captured by an aqueduct feeding the Allt nam Fiadh. South of the Glascarnoch dam, another aqueduct captures water from the Allt Giubhais Beag, which would have otherwise joined the Glascarnoch River below the dam.

A low dam was constructed across the western end of Loch Droma, and a penstock diverts water from the eastern end into Loch Glascarnoch. A compensation flow is provided to the Abhainn Droma, the original outflow of the loch, which drains westward into the River Broom and Loch Broom. Several intakes and pipelines divert tributaries of the Abhainn Droma into Loch Droma to provide additional water for the hydro scheme.

==== Achanalt power station ====
The waters of the River Bran, which flows into Loch Luichart, were exploited for the Achanalt power station, a run-of-river scheme located about 400 m (0.25 mi) SSW of the Grudie Bridge station. A small dam called the Achnalt Barrage, or Bran Barrage, was constructed across the river below Loch a' Chuilinn, with water also impounded in Loch Achanalt immediately upstream. This is raised the later level of Loch a' Chuilinn by around 1.5 m (5 ft) to provide a more constant flow through the power station. About 800 m (0.5 mi) downstream, and just upstream of the Conon Falls, water is diverted by a horseshoe-shaped weir into an intake and 200 m (660 ft) long head race pipeline. This weir is known locally as the "Horseshoe Falls", given its graceful curve. This arrangement provides a head of 66 feet (20 m) and the station has a capacity of 2.4 MW from a single vertical-axis Francis turbine. The power station building is a compact two bay structure, built into the cliff behind. It was designed by James Shearer and is Grade C listed.

==== Luichart power station, Lochs Luichart and Meig ====
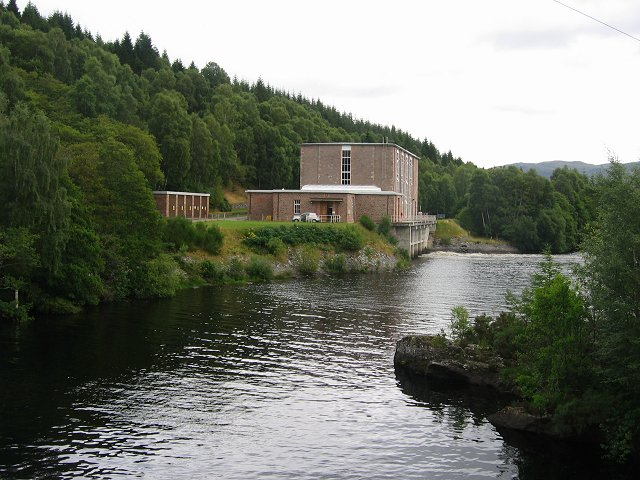
Luichart power station is located on the left bank of the Conon below Loch Luichart

A mass gravity dam was built at the eastern end of Loch Luichart, with a tunnel to supply water to Luichart power station at the western end of Loch Achonachie, which can provide 34 MW from a head of 184 feet (56 m). The tunnel runs from the north-west corner of the dam, which houses the control gates in predominantly functional concrete towers. It is approximately 1.25 km (0.78 mi) long, with a surge shaft constructed on the hillside above the power station. The dam did not require any significant degree of technical innovation, instead being a functional response to the relatively steep site.

Additional water was obtained by building a concrete gravity and earthfill dam across the River Meig, to form Loch Meig. The dam was built by Duncan Logan (Contractors), and was 585 feet (178 m) long with a height of 86 feet (26 m). A tunnel transfers water from Loch Meig to Loch Luichart, this also collects water from the Allt a' Ghlinne about 1 km (0.6 mi) before the outflow into Loch Luichart. The Meig Dam is of a fairly typical deign, with an arch concrete central section flanked by rubble filled gravity wings, which are covered with turf. The tunnel intake is at the north-west end of the dam which has a trash screen. There are also tunnel gates used to control the flow and can isolate the tunnel.

==== Torr Achilty power station, Loch Achonachie ====
The final part of this stage was to construct a dam across the River Conon at Torr Achilty, to create Loch Achonachie. The mass gravity dam is 808 feet (246 m) long and 76 feet (23 m) high. The power station is integrated into the downstream face of the dam. It was built to act as a control centre for the whole Conon Valley hydro scheme, so it includes workshops, a generous reception hall and staircase, with offices and control rooms upstairs. The water level in Loch Achonachie only varies by 2 feet (0.6 m), as the main function of the dam is to regulate compensation water in the river below. Discharges are fed through Torr Achilty power station, which can generate up to 15 MW.

=== Third phase: Orrin reservoir and power station ===
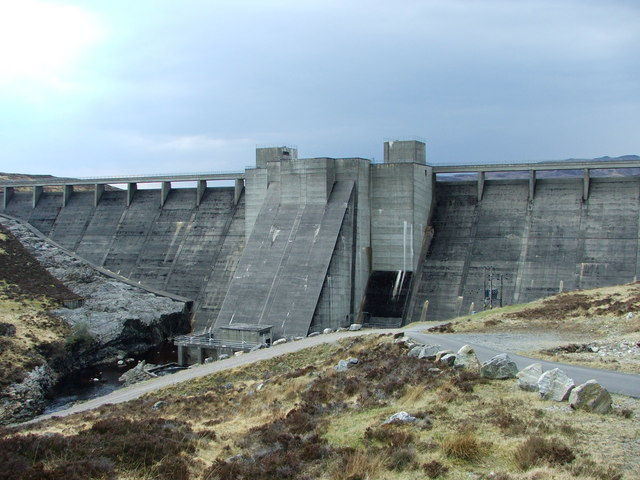
Orrin dam with spillways either side of the central fish pass

The third and final stage of the project was to modify the River Orrin, which drops by about 700 feet (210 m) in the 6 miles (10 km) above its junction with the Conon, while the River Conon drops less than 100 feet (30 m). Two dams were constructed to form the Orrin Reservoir about 8 miles (13 km) upstream from the junction. The resulting reservoir is nearly 5 miles (8 km) long. This raised the water level by around 135 ft (41 m) to a normal top water level of 839.75 ft (255.96 m) AOD. The dams can accommodate a water level fluctuation of 70 ft (21 m), giving an effective storage of 2075 million cubic feet (58.8M m^{3}), which is about 37% of the net mean annual flow.

A tunnel was constructed through the hillside, just over 17,000 feet (3.2 mi; 5.2 km) long, with an 8 1/2 ft (2.6 m) wide, concrete lined, D section. An above ground steel pipeline carries the water to Orrin power station on the southern shore of Loch Achonachie. A single 18 MW turbine is housed in the tall and narrow building which is built into the hillside. This phase cost £2.8 million, of which a substantial amount was needed to ensure that fishing could continue in the valley.

The main dam across the River Orrin is a concrete mass gravity dam, 1,025 feet (312 m) long at roadway level, and 167 ft (51 m) high. It consists of two spillway sections either side of the central section containing the fish passages. The spillway crest is divided into 17 sections each 42 ft (13 m) long, nine on the south and eight on the north. Four of these have an elevation of 839.75 ft (255.96 m) while the remainder are at 840.0 ft (256.0 m). Above these is a reinforced-concrete roadway supported on piers. The tunnel intake goes from the centre of the dam under the northern side, through a 9 ft 3 in (2.8 m) circular conduit. This enters rock about 250 ft (76 m) from the dam centreline, and transitions to the smaller D-shaped tunnel section after a further 470 ft (140 m), the first 400 ft (120 m) of this conduit also has a welded steel lining. The compensation flow in the River Orrin downstream of the dam passes through a small generator located at the base of the dam.

South of the main dam, an earth dam with a concrete core was constructed to prevent water flowing down a branch in the valley. This is of a similar length to the main dam and about 50 ft (15 m) high, but does not have any spillway provision. The concrete core tapers from 3 ft (0.9 m) wide at the top, to 6 ft (1.8 m) wide at the base, where it is keyed into sound rock to a depth of 5 ft (1.5 m). The upstream embankment has moraine material in the core with a substantial rockfill toe and facing. Above a level of 815 ft (248 m) it is protected with pre-cast concrete blocks 36 in (0.91 m) square and 12 in (0.30 m) thick, which were cast on top of the dam before being lifted into position. The downstream embankment is largely moraine.

The natural catchment of the reservoir is increased by an aqueduct, which brings water from the south and east, discharging into a small stream which flows into the reservoir about 1 kilometre (0.6 mi) west of the embankment dam. A second aqueduct captures the headwaters of the Allt na Fainich, diverting these into the main tunnel.

== Fish passes ==
Because of the large changes in the surface level of several of the reservoirs, the only type of fish pass that was acceptable to the fishing interests was a Borland fish pass. This is similar to a navigation lock, with an upper and lower pool, connected by a sloping shaft. Water flowing out of the lower pool attracts migrating fish such as salmon, and a sluice gate then closes so that the shaft fills, enabling the fish to reach the upper pool and to proceed upstream. Juvenile smolts can enter the upper pool and slither down the shaft when leaving the spawning grounds. A Borland fish pass can accommodate changes in the upper surface level of 20 feet (6.1 m), but because the level of the Orrin Reservoir varies by much more than this, four fish passes were built. Similar fish passes were also installed at Torr Achilty, Luichart, Meig and Achanalt dams, and whereas fish had previously been unable to access the Conon above Conon Falls, the fish passes opened up some 20 miles (32 km) of river to them, as far upstream as Achnasheen. As part of the project, 200,000 salmon fry were released into the Upper River Bran.

== See also ==
- List of power stations in Scotland
- Hydroelectricity in the United Kingdom

== Bibliography ==
- Donkin, S B; et al. (May 1952). "Discussion of Civil Engineering Aspects of Hydro-electric Development in Scotland". Proceedings of the Institution of Civil Engineers. 1 (3). Institution of Civil Engineers: 277–301. doi:10.1680/iicep.1952.10954. Archived from the original on 27 January 2023.
- Fraser, Norrie, ed. (1956). Sir Edward MacColl - A maker of modern Scotland. Edinburgh: Stanley Press.
- Miller, James (2002). The Dam Builders - Power from the Glens. Birlinn. ISBN 978-1-84158-225-2.
- Payne, Peter L (1988). The Hydro. Aberdeen University Press. ISBN 978-0-08-036584-8.
