= Loch Glascarnoch =

Reservoir in the highlands of Scotland

- Loch a' Ghlais-Chàrnaich (Scottish Gaelic)
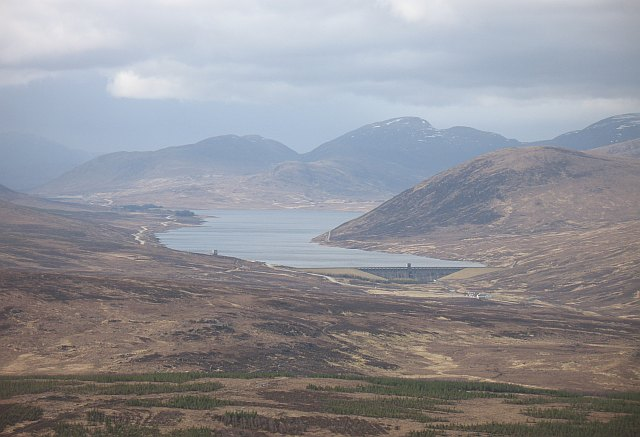
- Loch Glascarnoch and the hydroelectric dam

- Location within Highland Location within Scotland
- Interactive map of Loch Glascarnoch
- Location: Ullapool, Scottish Highlands
- Coordinates: 57°42′34″N 4°49′28″W
- Type: Reservoir
- Primary inflows: River Garbhrain
- Primary outflows: River Torrain Dubh
- Basin countries: Scotland
- Built: 1957
- Max. length: 7.2 km (4.5 mi)
- Surface area: 531.6 ha (1,314 acres)
- Shore length^{1}: 17.3 km (10.7 mi)
- Surface elevation: 255 metres (837 ft)
- ^{1} Shore length is not a well-defined measure.

Loch Glascarnoch (Scottish Gaelic: Loch a' Ghlais-Chàrnaich) is a 7.2 km-long (4.5 mi) reservoir in the Scottish Highlands between Ullapool and Inverness. The reservoir was built by the North of Scotland Hydro-Electric Board as part of the Conon Hydro Scheme, and is dammed on its eastern end.

== Details ==
The loch has an area of 531.6 ha (1,314 acres) with a shoreline length of 17.3 km (10.7 mi) and is about 7.2 km (4.5 mi) long. The lake's water level is about 255 metres (837 ft) above sea level and it is about 17.8 kilometres (11.1 mi) from the sea. There are no islands in this lake. The loch is fed by Loch Garbhrain via the River Garbhrain from the west along with several other small streams that flow into Loch Glas-Carnach.

Built in 1957 for the Neart nan Gleann project, it has a dam that was built at the eastern end of the Glascarnagh Valley. The dam is 28 m (92 ft) high and is approximately 510 metres (1,670 ft) long. The water flows through a tunnel approximately 8 km (5.0 mi) long to the Mossford Power Station. The power station produces approximately 18.6 megawatts, and an average of 121 million kWh per year. It was one of the dams built to generate hydroelectricity for the Conon Hydro-Electric Power Scheme. Today the scheme consists of six dams and seven hydroelectric power stations.The A835 runs along its southern edge, and the loch is a popular stop off point for motorists.

In the summer of 2020, water levels in the reservoir receded to the extent that old croft houses and bridges that were submerged when the reservoir was flooded were revealed.

== Climate ==
Climate data for Loch Glascarnoch (1991–2020 averages)
| Month | Jan | Feb | Mar | Apr | May | Jun | Jul | Aug | Sep | Oct | Nov | Dec | Year |
|---|---|---|---|---|---|---|---|---|---|---|---|---|---|
| Record high °C (°F) | 17.4 (63.3) | 16.0 (60.8) | 19.9 (67.8) | 23.7 (74.7) | 26.8 (80.2) | 28.0 (82.4) | 29.0 (84.2) | 27.8 (82.0) | 27.3 (81.1) | 20.4 (68.7) | 16.9 (62.4) | 14.7 (58.5) | 29.0 (84.2) |
| Mean daily maximum °C (°F) | 5.3 (41.5) | 5.8 (42.4) | 7.3 (45.1) | 10.3 (50.5) | 13.5 (56.3) | 15.4 (59.7) | 17.2 (63.0) | 16.7 (62.1) | 14.8 (58.6) | 11.0 (51.8) | 7.7 (45.9) | 5.5 (41.9) | 10.9 (51.6) |
| Daily mean °C (°F) | 2.2 (36.0) | 2.4 (36.3) | 3.8 (38.8) | 6.1 (43.0) | 8.7 (47.7) | 11.3 (52.3) | 13.2 (55.8) | 12.8 (55.0) | 10.8 (51.4) | 7.6 (45.7) | 4.5 (40.1) | 2.2 (36.0) | 7.2 (45.0) |
| Mean daily minimum °C (°F) | −1.0 (30.2) | −0.9 (30.4) | 0.3 (32.5) | 2.0 (35.6) | 4.0 (39.2) | 7.2 (45.0) | 9.1 (48.4) | 8.9 (48.0) | 6.9 (44.4) | 4.2 (39.6) | 1.3 (34.3) | −1.1 (30.0) | 3.4 (38.1) |
| Record low °C (°F) | −16.8 (1.8) | −17.4 (0.7) | −17.5 (0.5) | −9.0 (15.8) | −5.6 (21.9) | −3.5 (25.7) | 0.6 (33.1) | −0.6 (30.9) | −3.0 (26.6) | −6.4 (20.5) | −15.3 (4.5) | −20.8 (−5.4) | −20.8 (−5.4) |
| Average precipitation mm (inches) | 225.7 (8.89) | 170.1 (6.70) | 152.5 (6.00) | 102.0 (4.02) | 101.9 (4.01) | 86.8 (3.42) | 83.4 (3.28) | 111.9 (4.41) | 132.9 (5.23) | 187.8 (7.39) | 187.0 (7.36) | 200.9 (7.91) | 1,742.9 (68.62) |
| Average precipitation days (≥ 1.0 mm) | 20.3 | 18.6 | 19.0 | 16.1 | 15.7 | 15.0 | 15.5 | 16.4 | 17.0 | 19.9 | 20.3 | 19.8 | 213.5 |
| Mean monthly sunshine hours | 26.3 | 52.8 | 98.4 | 127.4 | 179.8 | 132.7 | 112.7 | 108.5 | 92.0 | 67.2 | 31.9 | 14.8 | 1,044.3 |
Source 1: Met Office
Source 2: Starlings Roost Weather
