= River Orrin =

River in Highland, Scotland

Coordinates: 57°32′57″N 4°29′28″W

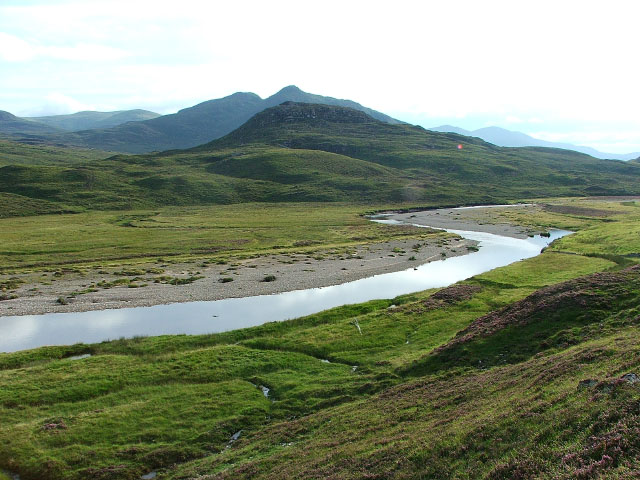
River Orrin upstream of the Orrin Reservoir

The River Orrin is a river in former Ross-shire, Highland, northern Scotland. It drains to the Cromarty Firth on the east coast.

The River Orrin is dammed in Glen Orrin making the Orrin Reservoir. This reservoir was constructed as part of the third and final phase of the Conon Hydro Scheme between 1955 and 1959 by the North of Scotland Hydro-Electric Board. Water from the River Orrin is diverted through a five-kilometre-long (three-mile) tunnel to a power station on the southern bank of Loch Achonachie.

About eight kilometres (five miles) downstream of the dam are the Falls of Orrin, the river is then joined by the right-bank tributary Allt Goibhre, and then enters the River Conon near Urray shortly before it flows past Conon Bridge into the Cromarty Firth.

The river gives its name to the aircraft in the 1985 British Airtours Flight 28M accident in which 55 passengers and crew perished at Manchester Airport.
