= Rogie Falls =

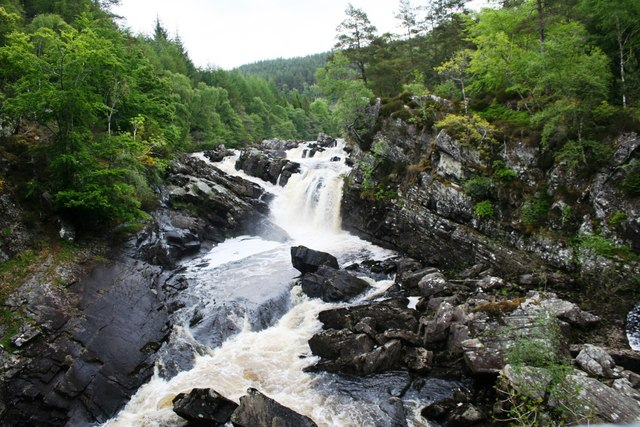
- Rogie Falls

- Location within Scotland
- Location: Ross-shire, Scotland
- Coordinates: 57.58873°N 4.60461°W
- Watercourse: Black Water

Rogie Falls (Gaelic: Eas Rothagaidh) are a series of waterfalls on the Black Water, a river in Ross-shire in the Highlands of Scotland. The falls are about 2 kilometres (1.2 mi) northwest of the village of Contin, next to the A835 road. They are a popular tourist attraction, with several forest walks.

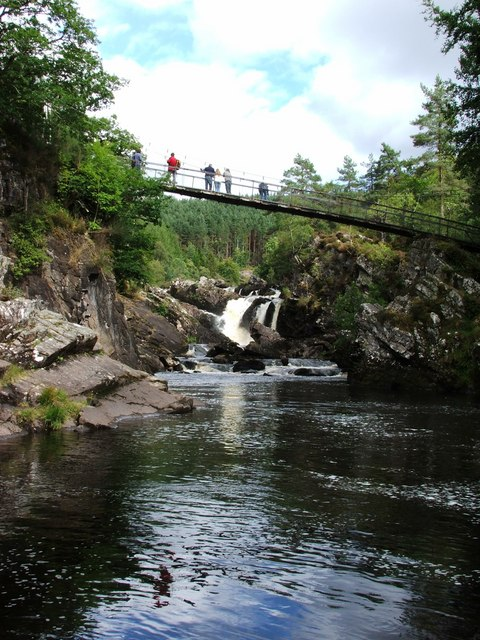
Rogie Falls and footbridge

The bridge will support a maximum of five persons, with a narrow and sharp set of steps at its end. Access to the bridge requires limited ability with footpaths being well kept, however not wheelchair accessible by any stretch. Photography from the bridge is possible although best either at evening time when fewer people are around and using the bridge or in sunnier conditions when shorter exposure times are possible, due to the high degree of wobble.

== See also ==
Media related to Rogie Falls at Wikimedia Commons

- Waterfalls of Scotland
