= Garve =

Coordinates: 57.61429°N 4.68481°W

Garve: Scottish Gaelic: Gairbh
- Location within the Ross and Cromarty area
- OS grid reference: NH397614
- Council area: Highland
- Country: Scotland
- Sovereign state: United Kingdom
- Post town: GARVE
- Postcode district: IV23
- Dialling code: 01997
- Police: Scotland
- Fire: Scottish
- Ambulance: Scottish

Garve (Scottish Gaelic: Gairbh) is a village on the Black Water river, in Ross-shire, and is in the Highland Council area of Scotland. It is situated 5 miles (8 km) northwest of Contin, on the A835, the main road to Ullapool on the west coast, close to where the A832 branches off towards Achnasheen.

The village is served by the Garve railway station, on the Kyle of Lochalsh Line, which crosses the A835 road on a level crossing. In 1890 Garve was proposed as the starting-point of a railway to Ullapool. The village has a primary school and a post office, but no shop. The village is within the Garve and District Community Council area.

Garve and District are served by the Garve and District Development Company, a company formed by the community during 2017.

== Climate ==
Climate data for Loch Glascarnoch (265m elevation) 1991–2020
Month	Jan	Feb	Mar	Apr	May	Jun	Jul	Aug	Sep	Oct	Nov	Dec	Year
Mean daily maximum °C (°F)	5.3 (41.5)	5.8 (42.4)	7.3 (45.1)	10.3 (50.5)	13.5 (56.3)	15.4 (59.7)	17.2 (63.0)	16.7 (62.1)	14.8 (58.6)	11.0 (51.8)	7.7 (45.9)	5.5 (41.9)	10.9 (51.6)
Mean daily minimum °C (°F)	−1.0 (30.2)	−0.8 (30.6)	0.3 (32.5)	2.0 (35.6)	4.0 (39.2)	7.2 (45.0)	9.1 (48.4)	8.9 (48.0)	6.9 (44.4)	4.2 (39.6)	1.3 (34.3)	−1.0 (30.2)	3.4 (38.2)
Average rainfall mm (inches)	225.7 (8.89)	170.1 (6.70)	152.5 (6.00)	102.0 (4.02)	101.9 (4.01)	86.8 (3.42)	83.4 (3.28)	111.9 (4.41)	132.9 (5.23)	187.8 (7.39)	187.0 (7.36)	200.9 (7.91)	1,742.9 (68.62)
Average rainy days (≥ 1.0 mm)	20.3	18.6	19.0	16.1	15.7	15.0	15.5	16.4	17.0	19.9	20.3	19.8	213.6
Mean monthly sunshine hours	26.3	52.8	98.4	127.4	179.8	132.7	112.7	108.5	92.0	67.2	31.9	14.8	1,044.5
Source: metoffice.gov.uk
