= Loch Achanalt =

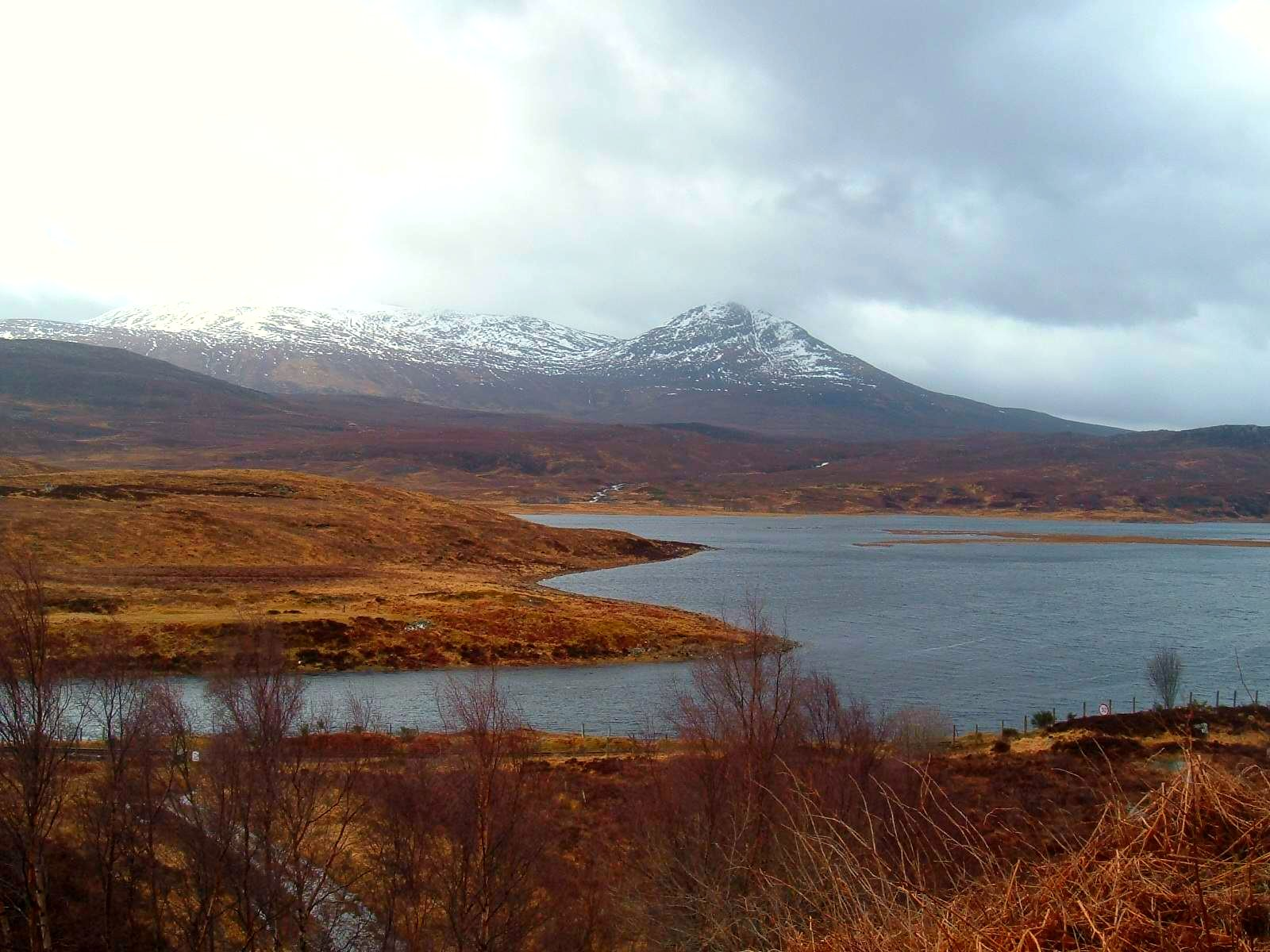

- Location within Highland
- Location: Ross and Cromarty, Highland, Scotland
- Coordinates: 57.6083°N 4.8932°W
- Type: Freshwater
- Primary inflows: River Bran
- Basin countries: Scotland
- Max. length: 1.21 km (0.75 mi)
- Max. width: 1.21 km (0.75 mi)
- Surface area: 19.7 ha (49 acres)
- Average depth: 1.37 m (4.5 ft)
- Max. depth: 2.75 m (9.0 ft)
- Water volume: 877,822 m^{3} (31,000,000 ft^{3})
- Shore length^{1}: 2.3 km (1.4 mi)
- Surface elevation: 112 m (367 ft)
- ^{1} Shore length is not a well-defined measure.

Loch Achanalt is a small, irregularly shaped, lowland freshwater loch in Ross and Cromarty in the Scottish Highlands, close to Achanalt railway station and the village of Achanalt. It is roughly quadrangular in shape with an approximate diameter of 1.21 km (0.75 mi), and is at an altitude of 112 m (367 ft). The average depth is 1.37 m (4 ft 6 in) and its maximum depth is 2.75 m (9 ft 0 in). The River Bran flows into the loch on its western shore, and at its eastern shore there is a short fast stream draining into Loch a' Chuilinn. The loch was surveyed on 9 August 1902 by R.M. Clarke and James Murray as part of Sir John Murray's Bathymetrical Survey of Fresh-Water Lochs of Scotland 1897–1909.

The Loch-class frigate HMS Loch Achanalt was named after the loch.
