= Loch Fannich =

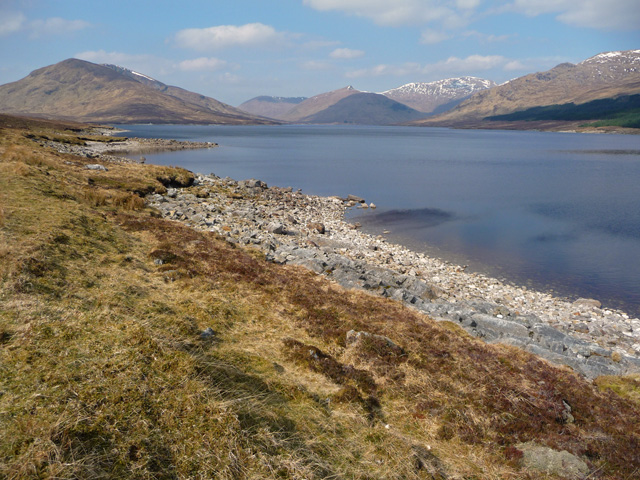

- Location within Scotland
- Location: Ross-shire, Scotland
- Coordinates: 57°38′30″N 5°00′10″W
- Type: loch

Loch Fannich is a remote loch in Ross-shire, in Scotland. The loch is located 19 kilometres (12 mi) west of Strathpeffer.

== Etymology ==
The name Fannich may represent an adaption into Gaelic of an earlier Pictish name, employing a cognate of Welsh gwaneg, meaning "a wave".

== Details ==
Loch Fannich was dammed and its water level raised as part of the Conon Hydro-Electric Power Scheme, built by the North of Scotland Hydro-Electric Board between 1946 and 1961. An underground water tunnel leading from Loch Fannich to the Grudie Bridge Power Station required blasting out a final mass of rock beneath the loch, a procedure which was referred to popularly as "Operation Bathplug".

There is no public road to the loch, and the distance from the A832 makes access difficult.

In the 1950s, the rising waters of the dammed loch subsumed the Cabuie Lodge (near the village of Achanalt), once home to Sir Arthur Bignold, MP for Wick Burghs in the early 20th century.

== Gallery ==
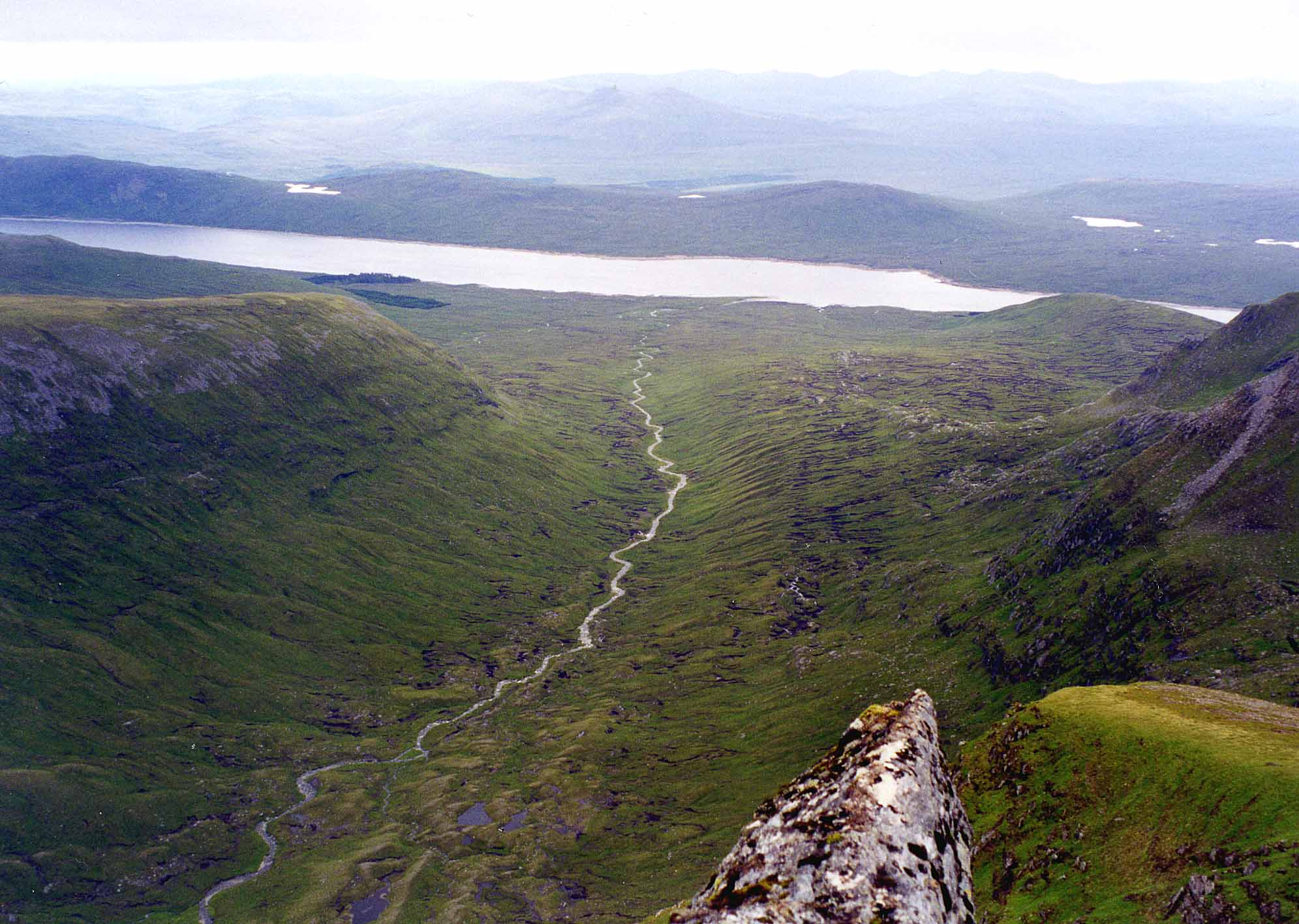
The Loch from above

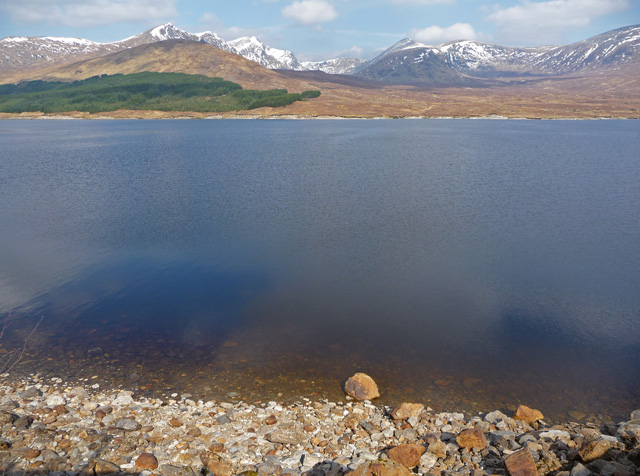
Across the Loch
