= River Conon =

River in Scotland

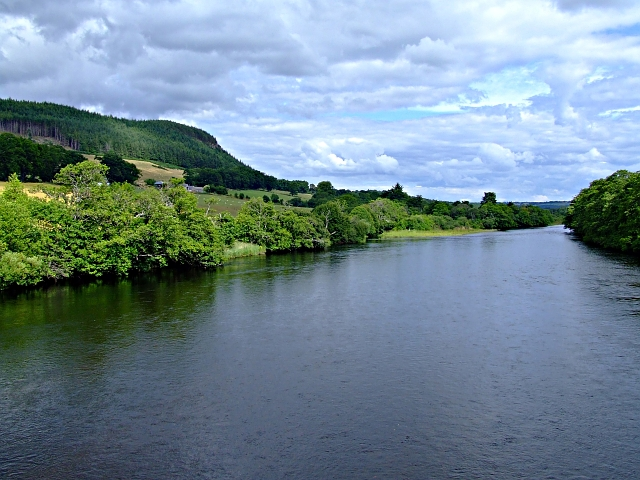
- The River Conon from Moy Bridge

- Location of the mouth within Scottish Highlands

Location
- Country: Scotland

Physical characteristics
- Source
  - location: Loch Luichart
  - coordinates: 57.5826°N 4.6969°W
- Mouth
  - location: Moray Firth
  - coordinates: 57.5813°N 4.4171°W

The River Conon (Scottish Gaelic: Conann) is a river in the Highlands of Scotland. It begins at Loch Luichart, and flows in a south-easterly direction to be joined by the River Meig at Scatwell before passing through Loch Achonachie. It is joined by the Black Water at Moy Bridge, and the River Orrin at Urray, before flowing past Conon Bridge and into the Cromarty Firth (and thence the Moray Firth and North Sea).

The river is part of the Conon hydro-electric power scheme, with dams at Loch Luichart, Loch Meig and Loch Achonachie, and power stations at Luichart and Torr Achilty. This major scheme was developed by the North of Scotland Hydro-Electric Board between 1946 and 1961. Prior to that, a small power station had been built at the Falls of Conon in the 1920s, and a private scheme for the Brahan Estate was commissioned in 2015 at Dunglass Island.

The river system is fished for trout and salmon, but populations of these fish have not always been as healthy as they now are. The use of traps and fixed nets in the river and in the Cromarty Firth has been the subject of legal action since 1828. The construction of hydro-electric schemes has resulted in some of the salmon spawning grounds being lost, but fish lifts at the dams and a fish pass at the Falls of Conon have enabled fish to reach the River Bran, which was previously inaccessible to them, and some 100 miles (160 km) of habitat suitable for young salmon has been developed. Although nets in the Firth have now gone, fish are predated by seals which live in the Firth, and hunt up river as far as Torr Achilty dam.

There are several islands in the river, including Moy Island, Dunglass Island and Garrie Island. The river is said to have once been the home of a water horse.

A medieval log boat was found in the River Conon near Dingwall. It was discovered in 1874 following a flood and change in the river's course. Three timbers from it were stored at the National Museums of Scotland, and subsequent radiocarbon dating suggests it was produced in the late 13th or early 14th century.

== Route ==
The waters that form the River Conon rise on Mòine Mhòr ("Great Moss"), an upland peat bog to the west of Achnasheen and to the south east of Kinlochewe. A series of springs on the slopes of Càrn Loisgte and Carn Breac fall into Loch na Mòine Mhòr and Loch an Fhiarlaid, from which the Abhain Dubh ("Black River") flows eastwards to the diminutive Loch Crann, and the much larger Loch a' Chroisg, which is over 160 feet (49 m) deep in places. The A832 Kinlochewe to Achnasheen road runs along the northern shore of the loch. From the eastern end of the loch, the waterway becomes the River Bran, and is crossed by a Parliamentary bridge at Achnasheen. This is a single span bridge built of rubble as part of a ten-year project to construct a road from Achnasheen to Strome Ferry between 1808 and 1819.

That road became the A890, but the bridge has been superseded by a wider one slightly further downstream. The river is joined by the Abhainn a' Chomair, which rises in the Glencarron and Glenuig Forest on the northern slopes of Cnoc na Mòine and Carn Gorm, where it is called the Allt Gharagain. This flows to the north, and turns to the north-east near the hamlet of Ledgowan, where it is joined by the A890 road and the Kyle of Lochalsh railway line. It enters a small loch, is joined by the Allt Mhartuin, and enters Loch Gowan. It joins the River Bran just before the railway bridge at Achnasheen railway station. The railway and the A832 road share the valley of the Bran as is continues eastwards. The valley widens to become Strath Bran, and after passing Achanalt railway station, the river enters Loch Achanalt.

The railway crosses to the south side of the waterway at a tiny river section called A Phait, between Loch Achanalt and Loch a' Chuilinn. There is a dam at the eastern end of the loch, and a little further downstream is Achanalt power station. This is housed in a tall single-storey building designed by James Shearer in 1952, built into a cliff at one end and constructed of random rubble. A fish pass consisting of natural pools and some artificial concrete pools enables migrating fish to bypass the power station. The River Grudie joins the River Bran on its left bank, and the Bran is crossed by the railway line close to Lochluichart railway station before the river enters Loch Luichart. The river from Loch a' Chuilinn to Loch Luichart is called the River Bran on modern maps, but was formerly called the River Conon and prior to that was called the River Conan

The River Grudie rises from a series of springs on the foothills of Meallan Chuaich, and is known as Abhainn a' Chadha Bhuidhe prior to entering Loch Fannich. Much of the outflow from the loch is via a tunnel to Grudie Bridge power station, but compensation water maintains the flow in the river, which follows a south-easterly course to reach the A832 road at Bridge of Grudie, with the power station immediately upstream of the bridge. Several of the tributaries of the Grudie are dammed, and a long surface pipeline feeds some of their flow into Loch Fannich.

=== Middle section ===
The railway and road follow the northern edge of Loch Luichart. Construction of the dam at the eastern end of the loch required some 2 miles (3.2 km) of the railway to be relocated, because the level of the loch was raised, and a new station was built, which opened on 3 May 1954. Mossford hydro-electric station is sandwiched between the road and railway a little further to the east, and water from Loch Fannich passes through the station and discharges into Loch Luichart. There is a scattering of houses in the area, which form the hamlet of Lochluichart. The Allt Coire Mhuilidh flows southwards and into the loch near the hamlet of Corriemoillie, after which the road and railway are separated from the loch by a range of hills, the highest of which is Cnoc na h-lolaire at 1,161 feet (354 m). The loch turns to the south, and the dam is to the north of Little Scatwell.

Below the dam, Allt a' Ghlinne joins the river on its right bank. A bridge carries the minor road from Little Scatwell, and immediately afterwards is Luichart power station, fed with water from Loch Luichart by a tunnel. The next tributary is the River Meig, which joins on the right bank. It rises as a series of springs and streams in Glencarron and Glenuig Forest, close to the source of the River Bran, but on the southern slopes of the hills. It passes through Gleann Fiodhaig and heads in a north-easterly direction to reach Loch Beannacharain. A minor road runs along the northern shore of the loch, which contains an artificial island at its eastern end, on which a prehistoric crannog settlement was built. Below the loch the river is joined by Allt Gleann Chorainn on its right bank, and then by Allt Gleann Meinich on its left bank. It turns to the east near the hamlet of Dalnacroich, where the wide valley is known as Strathconon. At Bridgend it is crossed by a bridge with three arches, approached by a causeway with six more arches. The structure dates from the early to mid-19th century. It carries the minor road that runs along Strathconon across the river to its southern bank. The river then enters the artificial Loch Meig, created by the dam at its eastern end, and passes through a natural arch before it joins the Conon.

=== Eastern section ===
The river continues eastwards to reach Loch Achonachie. On its southern bank is Orrin power station, which receives its water supply from Orrin Reservoir, an artificial loch on the River Orrin. Loch Achonachie was created by constructing a concrete mass gravity dam at its eastern end. It includes a Borland fish pass, to enable migrating fish to reach the upper reaches of the river, with a single-storey turbine hall and two-storey office block built into the dam structure. The architect was James Shearer, and the building is dated 1955. To the south of the dam is the Fairburn estate, 1,100 acres (445 ha) of designed landscape, created in the late 18th and early 19th century, before it was remodelled by John Stirling in the late 19th century. As well as remodelling the park, he built a Baronial mansion house in 1877–78. Known as Fairburn House, it was designed by Wardrop and Reid, and most of it has three storeys, although it includes a five-storey tower.

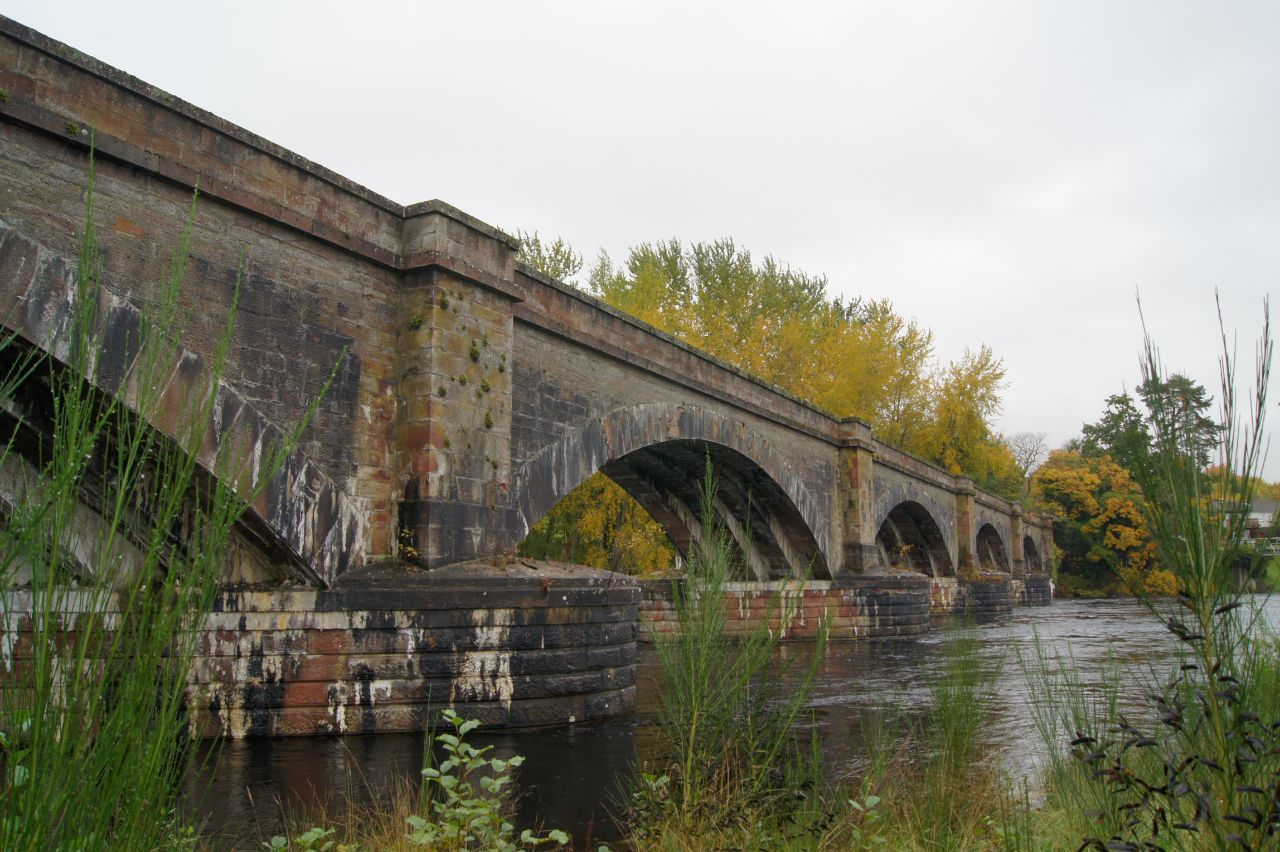
Conon railway bridge is skewed, and the staggered narrow arches used to achieve this can be clearly seen.

The Black Water joins on the left bank, after which the A832 road crosses at Moy Bridge, running from a junction with the A835 road on the north bank of the river to the village of Marybank, to the south. Moy island is formed where the channel splits, and then the north bank is the southern edge of the Braham estate, 1,295 acres (524 ha) of designed landscape. It was created in the 17th century, improved during the following two centuries, and hosts an extensive collection of specimen trees and rare species. The river is joined by the River Orrin on its left bank before it turns to the north, and the large Dunglass Island is now the site of a hydroelectric station for the Brahan estate. Conon Bridge railway station is close to the northern end of the island, and the Far North Line crosses the river on Cononbridge railway bridge. It was designed by Joseph Mitchell and constructed in 1860–62. With five arches and a span of 77 feet (23 m), it is sharply skewed, and this was achieved by building each span as five narrow spans, which are staggered to achieve the skew.

The railway bridge is the normal limit of tides. Next to the northern end of the bridge is an octagonal tollhouse, built by Joseph W Mitchell in 1828, which was used to collect tolls from people using Thomas Telford's Conon Bridge, which has since been demolished. The A862 road now crosses the river on a newer bridge. Garrie Island sits in the river before another road bridge that carries the A835 trunk road. The river channel widens to the south of Dingwall, as it becomes part of the Cromarty Firth. There is a rifle range to the east of Dingwall, and much of the firth is marked as a danger area. Beyond the danger area, the A9 road crosses the firth on Cromarty Bridge. This was opened on 12 April 1979, and is nearly 1 mile (1.6 km) long. The deck is carried by 67 piers, designed to minimise changes to the tidal flows, in order to protect the feeding ground which are an important habitat for migrating birds. A maintenance programme costing £1.5 million drew to a close in June 2018. Beyond the bridge, the Cromarty Firth carries the waters of the Conon to the sea.

== Hydroelectric development ==
Dingwall and Strathpeffer, both slightly to the north of the Conon near its mouth, had been supplied with hydro-electric power since 1903, when an 80 kW station was financed by Colonel E W Blunt-MacKenzie, the husband of the Countess of Cromarty. It was located at Ravens on Ben Wyvis. In 1926, the Ross-shire Electricity Supply Company took over the scheme and attempted to expand its operation. They borrowed £20,000 under the Trade Facilities Act, which financed the construction of a dam at the eastern end of Loch Luichart, and a power station near the Conon Falls. The power station was 120 feet (37 m) below the level of the loch, and contained two 500 kW generating sets. However, the company experienced difficulties in maintaining the system, and asked Scottish Power for help to manage and finance their operation in 1928. Scottish Power took over the company in 1931 when they bought all the share capital, repaid the startup loan, and increased the capacity of the Loch Luichart power station. By 1933, they had constructed a transmission line from the station along the shore of the Cromarty Firth and up the coast as far as Dornoch. and they were supplying electricity to an area of some 340 square miles (880 km^{2}) by 1938.

The dam for this scheme is thought to have been at the same location as the later dam. Two pipes ran from the dam to the turbine house, one of 3.3 feet (1.0 m) diameter, which split into two near the turbine house, and a second of 5.6 feet (1.7 m) diameter. Concrete cradles that carried the smaller pipe remain visible in the landscape, but most of those for the larger pipe have been destroyed by the construction of a road. The turbine house was being restored by the Hydro Board in 2008.

An even earlier scheme was located at the Orrin Falls on the River Orrin tributary. John Stirling of the Fairburn Estate used his workmen to build a turbine house by the Orrin Falls, and another further upstream. The project was overseen by a Mr Bagot from Glasgow, and Fairburn House had electric lighting by 1898. The river drops by around 50 feet (15 m) through a series of waterfalls at the Orrin Falls, and a dam some 160 feet (49 m) long was constructed at an angle to the flow of the river. Its maximum height was 11 feet (3.4 m) and there was a fish ladder at its northern end. This appears to have replaced an earlier dam, the remains of which are just downstream of the current structure. A generator house was built by Gilbert Gilkes & Co Ltd of Kendal in 1926, and probably replaced an earlier building at the same location. The installation was abandoned, probably in 1961, when much of the flow of the Orrin was diverted through a tunnel to the Orrin power station on the banks of Loch Achonachie. However, the scheme was refurbished in the 1980s, and once again supplies power to Fairburn House.

=== North of Scotland Hydro-Electric Board schemes ===
The Conon Valley was one of the early hydroelectric schemes implemented by the North of Scotland Hydro-Electric Board, constructed in three phases between 1946 and 1961. The scheme contains six power stations at Achanalt, Grudie Bridge, Mossford, Luichart, Orrin, and Torr Achilty. It has six major dams on Lochs Glascarnoch, Vaich, Luichart, and Meig, the Orin Reservoir, and at Torr Achilty. There is also a complex series of nine tunnels and many aqueducts to divert the water to the power stations. It is now operated by SSE Renewables.

=== Brahan scheme at Dunglass Island ===
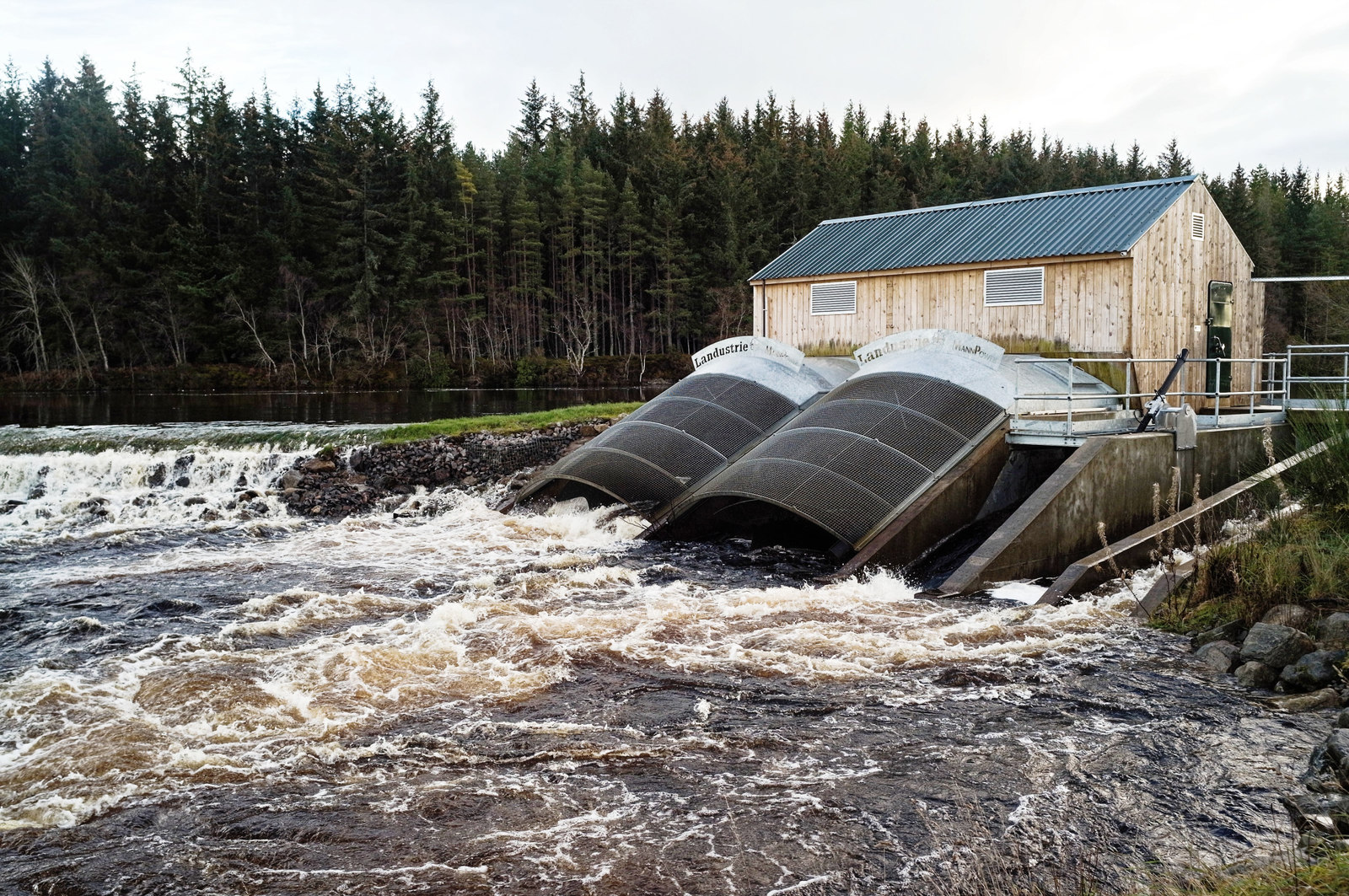
The Archimedes Screw hydroelectric station at Dunglass Island

At Dunglass Island, a weir at the upstream end controls the flow of water along the western side of the island, and there is a second weir half way along the eastern channel. During 2015, two Archimedes screw turbines were installed at the upstream weir, to provide power for the Brahan estate. The turbines produce a maximum of 100 kW, and energy not used by the estate is sold to the National Grid. The turbines, which were commissioned in October 2015, are designed to work with a head of just 5 feet (1.5 m). Because the level of the river fluctuates by up to 2.3 feet (0.7 m) as a result of discharges from the older hydro-electric schemes further up the river, the screws are set at different heights, to ensure the water is used efficiently whatever the river level.

== Fishing ==
The River Conon and its tributaries are fished for trout and salmon, but the present healthy state of the fish populations does not reflect the history of the river. The catching of salmon in the river and in the Cromarty Firth, which is protected from the open sea, has been a lucrative occupation for several centuries, and by the early 19th century, there were a large number of fixed nets in the firth, as well as nets and fixed salmon traps called cruives in the river. The Cromarty Estate fought a long battle in the courts to prevent other riparian landowners from using stake nets. It lasted from 1828 to 1837, and the court agreed with their case in 1838, prohibiting the use of fixed engine nets in the Firth. This became a byelaw in 1865. As fishing for salmon became more popular, the river proprietors realised that very few salmon were reaching the upper reaches of the river system to spawn, as so many were being caught in traps at Brahan or netted elsewhere.

In 1890, a group of river proprietors leased the cruives and net fishing rights at Brahan. For a while, no trapping or netting took place at these locations, but this resulted in many more fish being caught in the Firth. The cruives were in use again by 1901, but the catch was dwindling, and rod fishing started to become unviable. In 1920 the Moray Firth Salmon Fishing Company was set up by Sir John Stirling, Lord Roberts and others. The company bought up the fishing rights in the Firth and the Conon estuary, and no netting took place for a while to allow stocks to recover, after which they reintroduced fishing. They did not get the balance right, as stocks dwindled in the 1980s. The average number of fish caught in the Firth between 1977 and 1986 were 502 salmon and 1478 grilse, adult salmon that had only spent one year at sea before returning to the river. The Atlantic Salmon Conservation Trust bought the fishing rights in the Firth in 1991 and mothballed them.

The Conon and the Black Water were spring fisheries, but both rivers became less wild and more predictable after the construction of the hydroelectric scheme at the Falls of Conon in the 1920s and the major schemes built between 1946 and 1961. Although there had been floods in 1892 and 1922, there were four major floods between 1962 and 1989, with water levels on the Marybank to Moy Bridge road reaching 16 feet (4.9 m) in 1962. Subsequently, compensation flows from Loch Luichart were increased, to ensure that the loch had spare capacity at times of flood. The North of Scotland Hydro-electric Board bought all of the salmon fishing rights, apart from those owned by Sir John Stirling of the Fairburn estate, who refused to sell. The Board installed fish lifts at the dams, including a fish ladder at the Falls of Conon, enabling fish to reach the River Bran for the first time, and creating large new spawning grounds. They also created a large capacity hatchery, and guaranteed compensation flows on the Conon all year round, which prevented low water levels in the summer months from curtailing fishing.

The spawning grounds of the Black Water were largely destroyed by the damming of the river, and the dams do not have fish lifts. A fish trap on the upper Black Water is used to catch adult salmon, which are used to provide eggs for the hatchery. Although the fish lifts meant that adult salmon could more easily return to the spawning grounds above the dams, they were not well suited for smolts attempting to return to the sea, but modifications have been made to improve this situation. The Orrin and the Meig are no longer very accessible to adult salmon. The Orrin was particularly affected by dirt and silt being washed downstream while the works were being constructed, and an outbreak of ulcerative dermal necrosis in 1967 further affected fish stocks. In the ten years prior to 2006, the hatchery handled 2.6 million eggs each year, and during the same period, nearly 100 miles (160 km) of habitat suitable for juvenile salmon were brought into use. Although fish stocks appear to be recovering well, they are regularly predated by seals, as there is a population of around 400 in the Firth, which hunt on the river as far upstream as Torr Achilty dam. There is a large population of pike in the lower Conon, and a significant population of perch in the Bran. Mink have also become established in the area, particularly on the Black Water.

== Bibliography ==
- Ash, Russell (1973). Folklore, Myths and Legends of Britain. Reader's Digest Association. p. 436. ISBN 978-0-340-16597-3.
- Donkin, S B; et al. (May 1952). "Discussion of Civil Engineering Aspects of Hydro-electric Development in Scotland". Proceedings of the Institution of Civil Engineers. 1 (3). Institution of Civil Engineers: 277–301. doi:10.1680/iicep.1952.10954. Archived from the original on 27 January 2023.
- Fraser, Norrie, ed. (1956). Sir Edward MacColl - A maker of modern Scotland. Edinburgh: Stanley Press.
- Graham-Stewart, Andrew (2005). "Conon". The Salmon Rivers of the North Highlands and the Outer Hebrides. Robert Hale. ISBN 978-0-7090-7589-9. Archived from the original on 7 May 2022. Note: The internet copy does not include page numbers
- Marshall, Meryl (2 December 2016). "The Discovery and Recording of a Victorian Hydro scheme at Orrin Falls, Ross-shire". North of Scotland Archaeological Society. Archived from the original on 20 March 2022.
- Miller, James (2002). The Dam Builders - Power from the Glens. Birlinn. ISBN 978-1-84158-225-2.
- Payne, Peter L (1988). The Hydro. Aberdeen University Press. ISBN 978-0-08-036584-8.
