= Contin =

Village in Highland Scotland

Coordinates: 57.56802°N 4.57868°W

Contin: Scottish Gaelic: Cunndainn
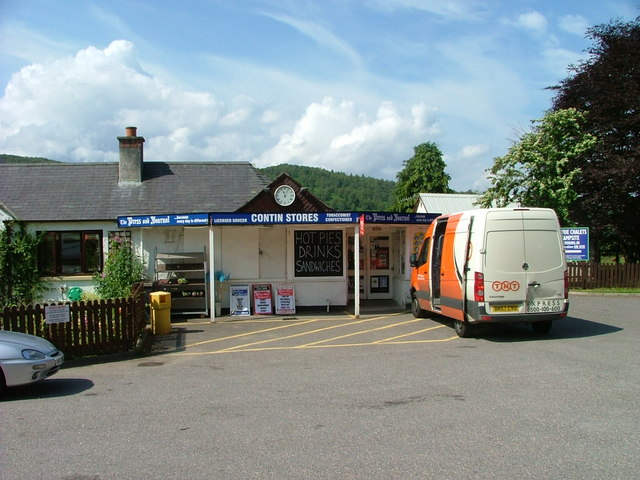
- Contin Stores

- Location within the Ross and Cromarty area
- Population: 675 (2001)
- OS grid reference: NH458560
- Community council: Contin
- Council area: Highland
- Lieutenancy area: Ross and Cromarty
- Country: Scotland
- Sovereign state: United Kingdom
- Post town: STRATHPEFFER
- Postcode district: IV14
- Dialling code: 01997
- Police: Scotland
- Fire: Scottish
- Ambulance: Scottish
- UK Parliament: Ross, Skye and Lochaber
- Scottish Parliament: Caithness, Sutherland and Ross

Contin (Gaelic: Cunndainn) is a Ross-shire village, and a civil parish and community council area between Strathpeffer and Garve in the Highland council area of Scotland. The parish has a population of 675.

The church in Contin is dedicated to St Maelrubha or Máel Ruba and is on Contin Island which lies in the Black Water (Conon) and is reached from the rest of the village by two bridges, one foot and the other road. The present building dates back to the 18th century but there has probably been a church on this site since the 7th or 8th century.

According to a booklet "Parish of Contin 690 to 1990", based on research by Rev. A.C. Maclean FSA, JP Minister from 1906 to 1937, published by the Church of Contin "Between 1485 and 1487 the Macdonalds and some of their allies (about 1,000 men) meeting at Contin, at the appropriately named (Scottish Gaelic: Blar' na'n Ceann) or the field of heads on their way to a punitive raid against the Mackenzies of Kinellan, discovered the church was filled with the aged men, women and children trusting to its sanctuary. Alexander Macdonald ordered the door to be shut and the building to be surrounded so that none could escape. He gave orders to set the church on fire, and everyone within - several hundreds - were burnt to death. Vengeance from the Mackenzies and Macreas was swift. After the battle at Pairc, one or two hundred out of 1,800 to 2,000 Macdonalds and their followers, who had eventually gathered at Contin, were left to escape as they might."

== Notable people ==
- Runrig songwriter and percussionist Calum MacDonald lives in the village in the Old Manse. Coul House Hotel is situated in the hills to the North of the village.
- John Mackenzie, recipient of the Victoria Cross
- Dr Paul Monaghan, SNP MP for Caithness, Sutherland and Easter Ross from 2015-17.
