= List of Highland Railway stations =

The main lines of the Highland Railway

The Highland Railway was one of the smaller British railways before the Railways Act 1921, operating north of Perth railway station in Scotland and serving the farthest north of Britain. Based in Inverness, the company was formed by merger in 1865, absorbing over 249 miles (401 km) of line. It continued to expand, reaching Wick and Thurso in the north and Kyle of Lochalsh in the west, eventually serving the counties of Caithness, Sutherland, Ross & Cromarty, Inverness, Perth, Nairn, Moray and Banff. Southward it connected with the Caledonian Railway at Stanley Junction, north of Perth, and eastward with the Great North of Scotland Railway at Boat of Garten, Elgin, Keith and Portessie.

In 1923, the company passed on approximately 494 miles (795 km) of line as it became part of the London, Midland and Scottish Railway. Although its shorter branches have closed, former Highland Railway lines remain open from Inverness to Wick and Thurso, Kyle of Lochalsh, Keith (as part of the Aberdeen to Inverness Line), as well as the direct main line south to Perth.

== Main line ==
The Highland Railway main line between Inverness and Perth, which opened in 1863, left the Caledonian Railway at Stanley and then ran north over the Grampian Mountains. After 1898 the line followed a more direct route via Carrbridge, leaving the earlier line via Forres at a junction at Aviemore.

Between 1865 and 1965 the Highland operated one branch from Ballinluig to Aberfeldy.

Station	Distance	Opened	Closed	Notes
Perth	0 mi 0 chains (0 km)	22 May 1842		Opened as Perth General, Joint station, renamed 1952.
Luncarty	4 mi 16 chains (6.8 km)	2 August 1848	18 June 1951	Caledonian Railway station
Strathord	5 mi 12 chains (8.3 km)	2 August 1848	13 April 1931	Opened as Dunkeld Road, renamed Strathord siding 1 February 1857, the 'siding' was dropped August 1866. Caledonian Railway station
Stanley	7 mi 18 chains (11.6 km)	2 August 1848	11 June 1956	Caledonian Railway station, Highland Railway main line left Caledonian line here.
Murthly	10 mi 28 chains (16.7 km)	7 April 1856	3 May 1965	
Rohallion		7 April 1856	October 1864	
Dunkeld & Birnam	15 mi 45 chains (25.0 km)	7 April 1856		Renamed Dunkeld in 1861; name been changed from Dunkeld & Birnam to Dunkeld and back again several times
Dalguise	20 mi 23 chains (32.6 km)	1 June 1863	3 May 1965	
Guay	21 mi 36 chains (34.5 km)	1 June 1863	3 August 1959	
Ballinluig	23 mi 44 chains (37.9 km)	1 June 1863	3 May 1965	Junction for Aberfeldy branch from 1865 to 1965.
Pitlochry	28 mi 36 chains (45.8 km)	1 June 1863		
Killiecrankie	32 mi 16 chains (51.8 km)	1865	3 May 1965	
Blair Atholl	35 mi 20 chains (56.7 km)	9 September 1863		Opened as Blair Athole, renamed 7 September 1893
Black Island Platform	36 mi 16 chains (58.3 km)		11 April 1959	Private
Struan	39 mi 65 chains (64.1 km)	9 September 1863	3 May 1965	
Dalanraoch	44 mi 49 chains (71.8 km)			
Dalnaspidal	50 mi 79 chains (82.1 km)	1865	3 May 1965	
Dalwhinnie	53 mi 0 chains (85.3 km)	9 September 1863		
Newtonmore	68 mi 58 chains (110.6 km)	9 September 1863		
Kingussie	71 mi 48 chains (115.2 km)	9 September 1863		
Kincraig	77 mi 33 chains (124.6 km)	9 September 1863	18 October 1965	Opened as Boat of Insch, renamed 1 September 1871
Aviemore	79 mi 49 chains (128.1 km)	3 August 1863		Junction for Forres line.
Carrbridge	90 mi 2 chains (144.9 km)	6 July 1892		Opened as Carr Bridge, renamed 16 May 1983
Tomatin	98 mi 79 chains (159.3 km)	8 July 1897	3 May 1965	
Moy	103 mi 10 chains (166.0 km)	8 July 1897	3 May 1965	
Daviot	107 mi 4 chains (172.3 km)	8 July 1897	3 May 1965	
Culloden Moor	111 mi 27 chains (179.2 km)	1 November 1898	3 May 1965	
Inverness	117 mi 78 chains (189.9 km)	5 November 1855		

=== Aberfeldy branch ===
The Aberfeldy branch left the main line at Ballinluig. The line opened on 3 July 1865 and was closed to passengers on 3 May 1965.

Station	Distance	Opened	Closed	Notes
Ballinluig	0 mi 0 chains (0 km)	On main line, 23 mi 44 chains (37.9 km) from Perth		
Balnaguard Halt (Note: Opened after the HR had become part of the LMS)	2 mi 11 chains (3.4 km)	2 December 1935	3 May 1965	
Grandtully	4 mi 27 chains (7.0 km)	3 July 1865	3 May 1965	
Aberfeldy	8 mi 59 chains (14.1 km)	3 July 1865	3 May 1965	

== Keith and Aviemore to Inverness ==
Station	Distance	Opened	Closed	Notes
Keith Junction	0 mi 0 chains (0 km)	18 August 1858		GnoSR station had opened 10 October 1856. Renamed Keith Junction by LMS, renamed Keith 12 May 1980. Junction with the Portessie branch
Tauchers Platform	3 mi 70 chains (6.2 km)	After 1923	7 December 1964	
Mulben	4 mi 75 chains (7.9 km)	18 August 1858	7 December 1964	
Orton	8 mi 27 chains (13.4 km)	18 August 1858	7 December 1964	From 1858 the Morayshire Railway operated a branch to Rothes. Through services operated until 1862 and services were withdrawn in 1866.
Orbliston Junction	11 mi 61 chains (18.9 km)	23 October 1858		Opened as Fochabers, renamed in 1893, when the junction to Fochabers Town opened, and renamed Orbliston in 1960.
Lhanbryde	14 mi 54 chains (23.6 km)	18 August 1858	7 December 1964	
Elgin	18 mi 5 chains (29.1 km)	25 March 1858		Morayshire had opened their station 10 August 1852, and the two stations were linked. The GNoSR reached here in xxx.
Mosstowie	21 mi 24 chains (34.3 km)	25 March 1858	7 March 1955	
Alves	23 mi 21 chains (37.4 km)	25 March 1858	3 May 1965	Junction for Burghead and Hopeman branch.
Kinloss	27 mi 8 chains (43.6 km)	25 March 1858	3 May 1965	Moved in 1860 when Findhorn branch opened, moved back in 1904
Forres	30 mi 20 chains (48.7 km)	25 March 1858		Moved in 1863, when line to Perth opened. Junction with line from Aviemore, continues to Inverness.
Station	Distance from Perth	Opened	Closed	Notes
Aviemore	79 mi 49 chains (128.1 km)	3 August 1863		Junction for Direct line via Carrbridge
Boat of Garten	88 mi 44 chains (142.5 km)	3 August 1863	18 October 1965	Joint station with GnoSR. Heritage Railway
Broomhill	92 mi 55 chains (149.2 km)	3 August 1863	18 October 1965	Broomhill for Nethy Bridge in some timetables
Grantown on Spey West	95 mi 76 chains (154.4 km)	3 August 1863	18 October 1965	Opened as Grantown, renamed Grantown-on-Spey 1912, West added 1950
Castle Grant Platform	98 mi 21 chains (158.1 km)	3 August 1863		Private
Dava	104 mi 32 chains (168.0 km)	6 February 1905	18 October 1965	
Dunphail	110 mi 58 chains (178.2 km)	3 August 1863	18 October 1965	
Rafford		3 August 1863	31 May 1865	
Forres	119 mi 24 chains (192.0 km)	Joins line from Keith		
Brodie	122 mi 55 chains (197.4 km)	22 December 1857	3 May 1965	
Auldearn	126 mi 31 chains (203.4 km)	10 March 1905	6 June 1960	
Nairn	128 mi 63 chains (207.3 km)	5 November 1855		
Gollanfield	134 mi 28 chains (216.2 km)	5 November 1855	3 May 1965	Opened as Fort George, renamed Gollanfield Junction 1899 and renamed Gollanfield 1959.
Dalcross	137 mi 10 chains (220.7 km)	5 November 1855	3 May 1965	
Castle Stuart Platform	138 mi 23 chains (222.6 km)			Private
Allanfearn	140 mi 46 chains (226.2 km)	5 November 1855	3 May 1965	Opened as Culloden, renamed 1898
Inverness	143 mi 75 chains (231.6 km)	5 November 1855		

=== Portessie branch ===
Station	Distance	Opened	Closed	Notes
Keith Junction	0 mi 0 chains (0 km)			
Aultmore	2 mi 27 chains (3.8 km)	1 August 1884	9 August 1915	Opened as Forgie, renamed 1899.
Enzie	5 mi 63 chains (9.3 km)	1 August 1884	9 August 1915	
Drybridge Platform	10 mi 03 chains (16.2 km)	1 August 1884	9 August 1915	
Rathven	11 mi 29 chains (18.3 km)	1864	14 September 1931	Opened as Wards, renamed Coltfield 1865, and Coltfield Platform about 1880.
Buckie	12 mi 26 chains (19.8 km)	23 December 1862	14 September 1931	
Portessie	13 mi 64 chains (22.2 km)	10 October 1892	14 September 1931	.
Junction with GNoSR	13 mi 71 chains (22.3 km)			

=== Fochabers branch ===
Station	Distance	Opened	Closed	Notes
Orbliston Junction	0 mi 0 chains (0 km)	On Keith to Inverness line, 11 miles 61 chains (18.9 km) from Keith		
Balnacoul Halt	2 mi 19 chains (3.6 km)		14 September 1931	
Fochabers Town	3 mi 00 chains (4.8 km)	23 October 1893	14 September 1931	Opened as Fochabers, renamed in 1894.

=== Burghead and Hopeman branch ===
Station	Distance	Opened	Closed	Notes
Alves	0 mi 0 chains (0 km)	On Keith to Inverness line, 23 miles 21 chains (37.4 km) from Keith		
Coltfield	2 mi 20 chains (3.6 km)	1864	14 September 1931	Opened as Wards, renamed Coltfield 1865, and Coltfield Platform about 1880.
Burghead	5 mi 37 chains (8.8 km)	23 December 1862	14 September 1931	Station moved in 1892, distance shown for original station
Hopeman	7 mi 5 chains (11.4 km)	10 October 1892	14 September 1931	Closed between 1917 and 1918/9.

=== Findhorn branch ===
An independent company built and opened the railway, and the line was taken over by the Inverness & Aberdeen Junction Railway 1862. The line was closed by the Highland in 1869.

Station	Distance	Opened	Closed	Notes
Kinloss	0 mi (0 km)	On Keith to Inverness line, 27 miles 8 chains (43.6 km) from Keith		
Findhorn	3 mi (4.8 km)	18 April 1860	1 January 1869	

=== Fort George branch ===
Station	Distance	Opened	Closed	Notes
Gollanfield Junction	0 mi 0 chains (0 km)	On Aviemore to Inverness line, 134 miles 28 chains (216.2 km) from Perth		
Fort George	134 mi 28 chains (216.2 km)	1 July 1899	5 April 1943	Restricted service after 1943

== Far North Line ==
The Far North Line between Inverness and Wick and Thurso opened in stages between 1862 and 1874. As well as the Kyle of Lochalsh Line that branches at Dingwell, the Black Isle Branch left at Muir of Ord for Fortrose, the Dornoch Light Railway left at The Mound for Dornoch and the Wick & Lybster Light Railway ran from Wick to Lybster.

Station	Distance from Perth	Opened	Closed	Notes
Inverness	117 mi 34 chains (189.0 km)	5 November 1855		
Bunchrew	121 mi 34 chains (195.4 km)	11 June 1862	13 June 1960	
Lentran	123 mi 45 chains (198.9 km)	11 June 1862	13 June 1960	Reopened briefly during March 1982
Clunes	124 mi 29 chains (200.1 km)	1864		
Beauly	127 mi 67 chains (205.7 km)	11 June 1862	13 June 1960	Reopened 2002
Muir of Ord	130 mi 61 chains (210.4 km)	11 June 1862		Junction for the Black Isle Branch. Closed 1960–76.
Conon	133 mi 78 chains (215.6 km)	11 June 1862	13 June 1960	Reopened 2013 as Conon Bridge
Dingwall	136 mi 34 chains (219.6 km)	11 June 1862		Junction for Kyle of Lochalsh Line
Foulis	140 mi 51 chains (226.3 km)	23 May 1863	13 June 1960	Opened as Fowlis, renamed 1916
Evanton	142 mi 58 chains (229.7 km)	23 May 1863	13 June 1960	Opened as Novar, renamed 1937
Alness	146 mi 25 chains (235.5 km)	23 May 1863		Closed 1960–73
Invergordon	149 mi 12 chains (240.0 km)	23 May 1863		
Delny	152 mi 53 chains (245.7 km)	1 June 1864	13 June 1960	
Kildary	154 mi 35 chains (248.5 km)	1 June 1864	13 June 1960	Opened as Parkhill, renamed May 1868
Nigg	156 mi 79 chains (252.6 km)	1 June 1864	13 June 1960	
Fearn	158 mi 34 chains (255.0 km)	1 June 1864		
Tain	162 mi 0 chains (260.7 km)	1 June 1864		
Edderton	167 mi 29 chains (269.3 km)	1 October 1864	13 June 1960	
West Fearn Platform	172 mi 78 chains (278.4 km)	1926	1928	Briefly open as Mid Fearn Halt in 1864/5
Ardgay	175 mi 43 chains (282.5 km)	1 October 1864		Bonar Bridge until May 1977
Culrain	178 mi 51 chains (287.5 km)	1871		
Invershin	179 mi 7 chains (288.2 km)	13 April 1868		
Lairg	184 mi 49 chains (297.1 km)	13 April 1868		
Rogart	194 mi 47 chains (313.2 km)	13 April 1868		Closed 1960/1
The Mound	198 mi 44 chains (319.5 km)	13 April 1868	13 June 1960	Junction for the Dornoch Light Railway.
Golspie	202 mi 6 chains (325.2 km)	13 April 1868		
Dunrobin	203 mi 72 chains (328.1 km)	1 November 1870		Private after 1871, closed 1965. Reopened for irregular services after 1985
Brora	208 mi 15 chains (335.0 km)	19 June 1871		
Loth	213 mi 39 chains (343.6 km)	19 June 1871	13 June 1960	
Helmsdale	219 mi 10 chains (352.6 km)	19 June 1871		
Salzcraggie Platform	221 mi 70 chains (357.1 km)	28 July 1874	29 November 1965	Restricted use after 1907
Kildonan	228 mi 52 chains (368.0 km)	28 July 1874		
Borrobol	232 mi 42 chains (374.2 km)	1878	29 November 1965	Known as Borrobol Platform until 1962
Kinbrace	235 mi 71 chains (379.6 km)	28 July 1874		
Forsinard	243 mi 34 chains (391.8 km)	28 July 1874		
Altnabreac	251 mi 56 chains (405.1 km)	28 July 1874		
Scotscalder	260 mi 61 chains (419.7 km)	28 July 1874		
Halkirk	263 mi 39 chains (424.0 km)	28 July 1874		
Georgemas Junction	264 mi 79 chains (426.5 km)	28 July 1874		Junction for Thurso
Bower	267 mi 59 chains (430.9 km)	28 July 1874	13 June 1960	
Watten	271 mi 50 chains (437.1 km)	28 July 1874	13 June 1960	
Bilbster	275 mi 7 chains (442.7 km)	28 July 1874	13 June 1960	
Wick	279 mi 14 chains (449.3 km)	28 July 1874		

=== Black Isle branch ===
Station	Distance	Opened	Closed	Notes
Muir of Ord	0 mi 0 chains (0 km)	On Far North Line, 130 mi 61 chains (210.4 km) from Perth		
Redcastle	3 mi 58 chains (6.0 km)	1 February 1894	1 October 1951	
Allangrange	5 mi 39 chains (8.8 km)	1 February 1894	1 October 1951	
Munlochy	8 mi 02 chains (12.9 km)	1 February 1894	1 October 1951	
Avoch	11 mi 25 chains (18.2 km)	1 February 1894	1 October 1951	
Fortrose	13 mi 45 chains (21.8 km)	1 February 1894	1 October 1951	

=== Dornoch Light Railway ===
Station	Distance	Opened	Closed	Notes
The Mound	0 mi 0 chains (0 km)	On Far North Line, 198 mi 44 chains (319.5 km) from Perth		
Cambusavie Halt	1 mi 28 chains (2.2 km)	2 June 1902	13 June 1960	
Skelbo	3 mi 60 chains (6.0 km)	2 June 1902	13 June 1960	
Embo	5 mi 33 chains (8.7 km)	2 June 1902	13 June 1960	
Dornoch	7 mi 51 chains (12.3 km)	2 June 1902	13 June 1960	

=== Georgemas Branch ===
Station	Distance	Opened	Closed	Notes
Georgemas Junction	0 mi 0 chains (0 km)	On Far North Line, 264 miles 79 chains (426.5 km) from Perth		
Hoy	0 mi 75 chains (1.5 km)	28 July 1874	29 November 1965	
Thurso	6 mi 52 chains (10.7 km)	28 July 1874		

=== Wick & Lybster Light Railway ===
Station	Distance	Opened	Closed	Notes
Wick	0 mi 0 chains (0 km)	On Far North Line, 279 miles 14 chains (449.3 km) from Perth		
Thrumster	4 mi 32 chains (7.1 km)	1 July 1903	1 April 1944	
Welsh's Crossing Halt	6 mi 52 chains (10.7 km)		1 April 1944	
Ulbster	7 mi 47 chains (12.2 km)	1 July 1903	1 April 1944	
Mid Clyth	9 mi 52 chains (15.5 km)	1 July 1903	1 April 1944	
Roster Road Halt	10 mi 09 chains (16.3 km)	c. 1938	1 April 1944	
Occumster	12 mi 32 chains (20.0 km)	1 July 1903	1 April 1944	
Parkside Halt	12 mi 72 chains (20.8 km)	c. 1938	1 April 1944	
Lybster	13 mi 63 chains (22.2 km)	1 July 1903	1 April 1944	

== Kyle of Lochalsh Line ==
The Kyle of Lochalsh Line leaves the Far North Line at Dingwall. Between 1885 and 1946 a branch left the line at Fodderty Junction, 138 miles 56 chains (223.2 km) from Perth. The line was diverted in 1954, as part of a hydro electric project that raised the level of Loch Luichart, the distances are measured from Perth via this new line.

Station	Distance	Opened	Closed	Notes
Dingwall	136 mi 34 chains (219.6 km) from Perth on Far North Line			
Achterneed	141 mi 7 chains (227.1 km)	19 August 1870	7 December 1965	Opened as Strathpeffer, renamed 1885.
Garve	148 mi 23 chains (238.6 km)	19 August 1870		
Lochluichart	153 mi 44 chains (247.1 km)	1 August 1871		Station and line moved in 1954
Achanalt	157 mi 74 chains (254.2 km)	19 August 1870		
Achnasheen	164 mi 24 chains (264.4 km)	19 August 1870		
Glencarron	172 mi 52 chains (277.9 km)	1 August 1871	7 December 1964	Opened as Glencarron Platform, renamed 1962
Achnashellach	176 mi 66 chains (284.6 km)	1871		
Strathcarron	182 mi 23 chains (293.4 km)	19 August 1870		
Attadale	184 mi 49 chains (297.1 km)	1880		
Stromeferry	189 mi 42 chains (305.0 km)	19 August 1870		
Duncraig	193 mi 36 chains (311.3 km)	23 May 1949		Opened as Duncraig platform, renamed 1962. Closed between 1964 and 1976
Plockton	194 mi 49 chains (313.2 km)	2 November 1897		
Duirinish	196 mi 3 chains (315.5 km)	2 November 1897		
Kyle of Lochalsh	200 mi 6 chains (322.0 km)	2 November 1897		

=== Strathpeffer Branch ===
Station	Distance	Opened	Closed	Notes
Dingwall	136 mi 34 chains (219.6 km) from Perth on Far North Line			
Strathpeffer	141 mi 14 chains (227.2 km)	3 June 1885	23 February 1946	

== Invergarry & Fort Augustus Railway ==
The Invergarry & Fort Augustus Railway was an isolated branch from Spean Bridge that was worked by the Highland from when it opened in 1903 until 1 May 1907, when the North British Railway took over.

Station	Distance	Opened	Closed	Notes
Spean Bridge	0 mi 0 chains (0 km)	7 August 1894		
Gairlochy	2 mi 58 chains (4.4 km)	22 July 1903	1 December 1933	Closed 1911–13
Invergloy Platform	7 mi 29 chains (11.8 km)	22 July 1903	1 December 1933	Closed 1911–13
Invergarry	15 mi 12 chains (24.4 km)	22 July 1903	1 December 1933	Closed 1911–13
Aberchalder	19 mi 34 chains (31.3 km)	22 July 1903	1 December 1933	Closed 1911–13
Fort Augustus	23 mi 19 chains (37.4 km)	22 July 1903	1 December 1933	Closed 1911–13
Fort Augustus Pier	24 mi 16 chains (38.9 km)	22 July 1903	1 October 1906	

== Notes and references ==
=== Sources ===
- Butt, R. V. J. (1995). The Directory of Railway Stations: details every public and private passenger station, halt, platform and stopping place, past and present (1st ed.). Patrick Stephens Ltd. ISBN 1-85260-508-1.
- Vallance, H. A. (27 June 1991). Great North of Scotland railway. The History of the Railways of the Scottish Highlands vol 3. David St John Thomas. ISBN 978-0-946537-60-0.
- Vallance, H.A.; Clinker, C.R. (1971). The Highland Railway. Pan Macmillan. ISBN 978-0-330-02720-5.
