= Welsh's Crossing Halt railway station =

Former railway station in Scotland

Coordinates: 58.3743°N 3.1558°W

Welsh's Crossing Halt

General information
- Location: Between Ulbster and Thrumster, Highland; Scotland
- Platforms: 1

Other information
- Status: Disused

History
- Opened: 27 January 1936; 90 years ago
- Closed: 3 April 1944; 82 years ago
- Original company: LMS
- Post-grouping: LMS
Location

Welsh's Crossing Halt was a railway station located south of Thrumster, Highland between Wick and Lybster as part of the Wick and Lybster Light Railway. It officially opened in 1903, and was closed, along with the rest of the line, in 1944.

== History ==
The station was opened as part of the Wick and Lybster Railway, which was built to act as transportation between the towns of Wick and Lybster, Caithness.After the line was permanently closed on 3 April 1944, the station was closed. While the general location of the trackbed is still visible, the station has disappeared.

Preceding station	Disused railways	Following station
Ulbster; Station and Line closed	Highland Railway; Wick and Lybster Light Railway	Thrumster; Station and Line closed
