= Roster Road Halt railway station =

Former railway station in Scotland

Coordinates: 58.3197°N 3.2103°W

Roster Road Halt

General information
- Location: Between Ulbster and Lybster, Highland; Scotland
- Platforms: 1

Other information
- Status: Disused

History
- Opened: c. 1938; 88 years ago
- Closed: 3 April 1944; 82 years ago
- Original company: LMS
- Post-grouping: LMS
Location

Roster Road Halt was a railway station located between Wick and Lybster in Highland, Scotland.

== History ==
The station was opened on the Wick and Lybster Railway by the LMS in 1938. The station was approximately 3 miles from Roster. The station was near a level crossing. Today only a few railway houses remain. As with the other stations on the line, the station was closed from 3 April 1944.

As of 2022, a railway cottage remains.

Preceding station	Disused railways	Following station
Occumster; Station and Line closed	Highland Railway; Wick and Lybster Light Railway	Mid Clyth; Station and Line closed
