= Parkside Halt railway station =

Former railway station in Scotland

Coordinates: 58.3099°N 3.2796°W

Parkside Halt

General information
- Location: Between Ulbster and Lybster, Highland; Scotland
- Platforms: 1

Other information
- Status: Disused

History
- Opened: c. 1938; 88 years ago
- Closed: 3 April 1944; 82 years ago
- Original company: LMS
Location

Parkside Halt was a railway station located between Ulbster and Lybster, Highland. This is not a widely known railway station, however it is a very old and significant one; known by residents nearby.

== History ==
The station was opened on the Wick and Lybster Railway by the LMS in 1938. As with the other stations on the line, the station was closed from 3 April 1944. The station was a halt, which means it did not have a full range of facilities or services. It was primarily used for local passenger traffic and possibly some freight services.

As of 2022, a railway cottage remains.

Preceding station	Disused railways	Following station
Lybster; Station and Line closed	Highland Railway; Wick and Lybster Light Railway	Occumster; Station and Line closed
