= Occumster railway station =

Railway station in Highland, Scotland

Coordinates: 58.3078°N 3.2565°W

Occumster
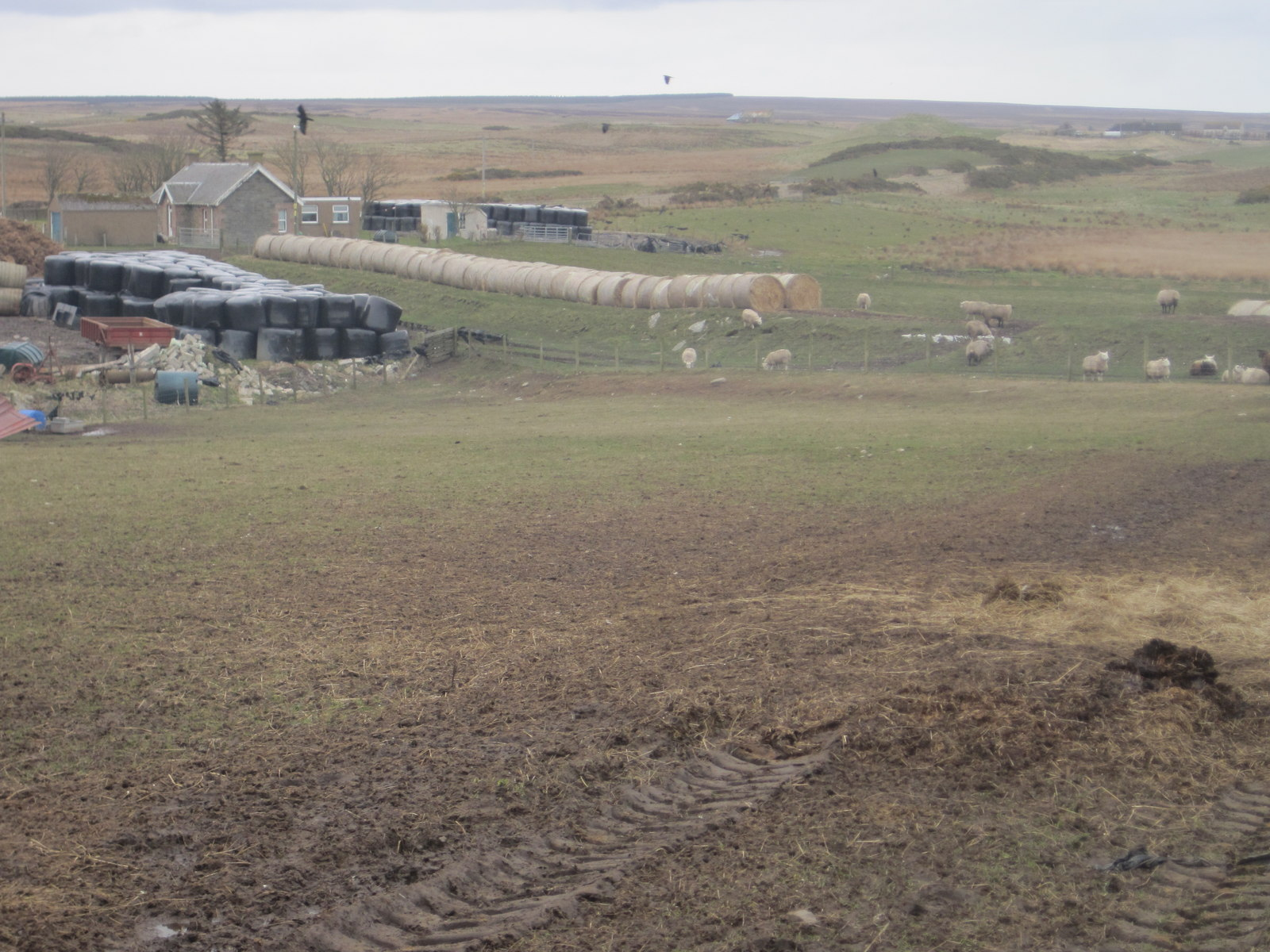
- The site of the station in 2015

General information
- Location: Between Ulbster and Lybster, Highland; Scotland
- Platforms: 1

Other information
- Status: Disused

History
- Opened: 1 July 1903; 122 years ago
- Closed: 3 April 1944; 81 years ago
- Original company: Wick and Lybster Railway
- Pre-grouping: Wick and Lybster Railway operated by Highland Railway
- Post-grouping: LMS
Location

Occumster was a railway station located between Wick and Lybster, Highland.

== History ==
The station was opened as part of the Wick and Lybster Railway on 1 July 1903. As with the other stations on the line, the station was closed from 3 April 1944. The station was used as a Post Office after it was decommissioned as a station. It burnt down in the 1980's.

Preceding station	Disused railways	Following station
Parkside Halt; Station and Line closed	Highland Railway; Wick and Lybster Light Railway	Roster Road Halt; Station and Line closed
