= Loch of Yarrows =

Loch in Scotland

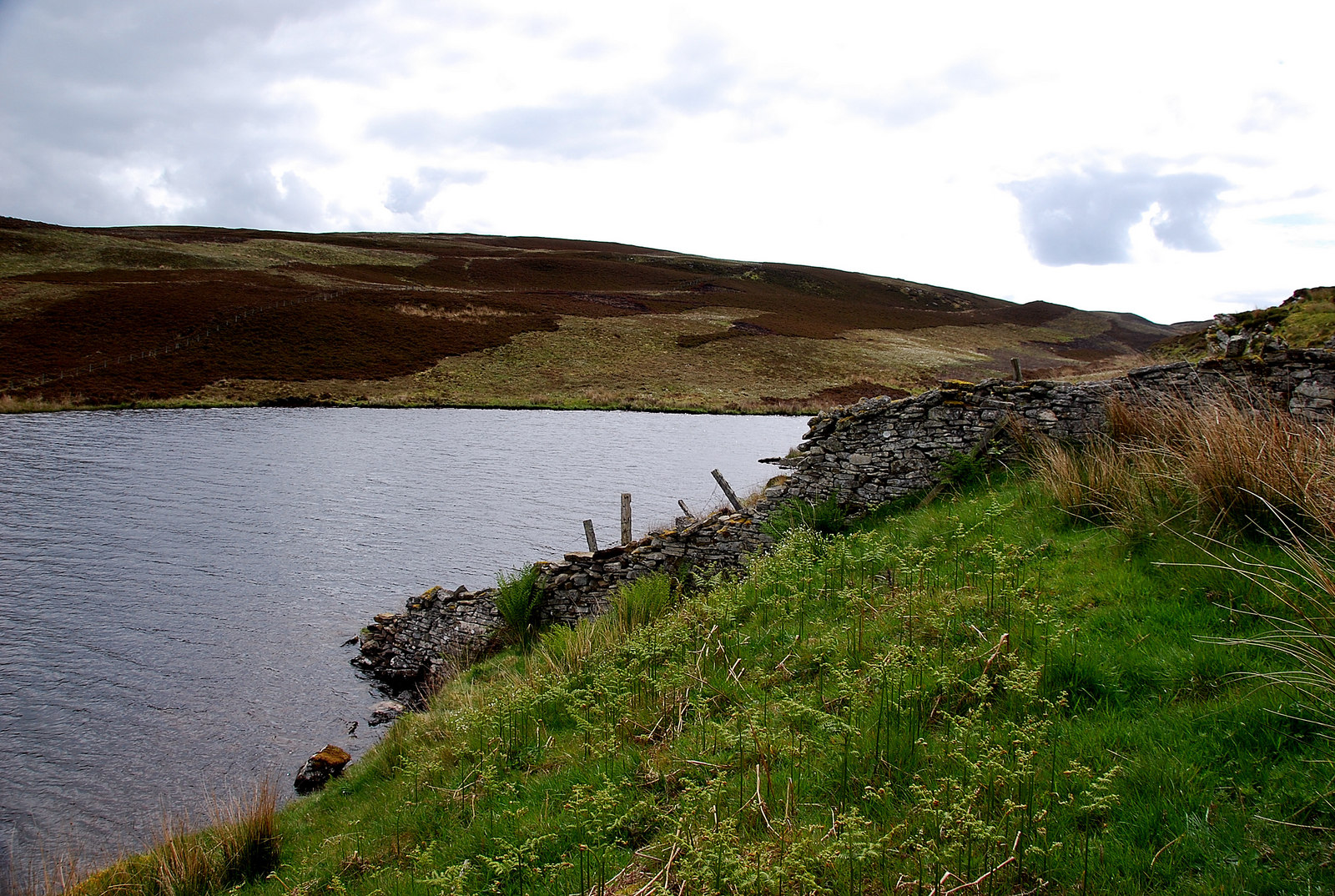
- Loch of Yarrows from its south shore, with the Yarrows Broch in the foreground

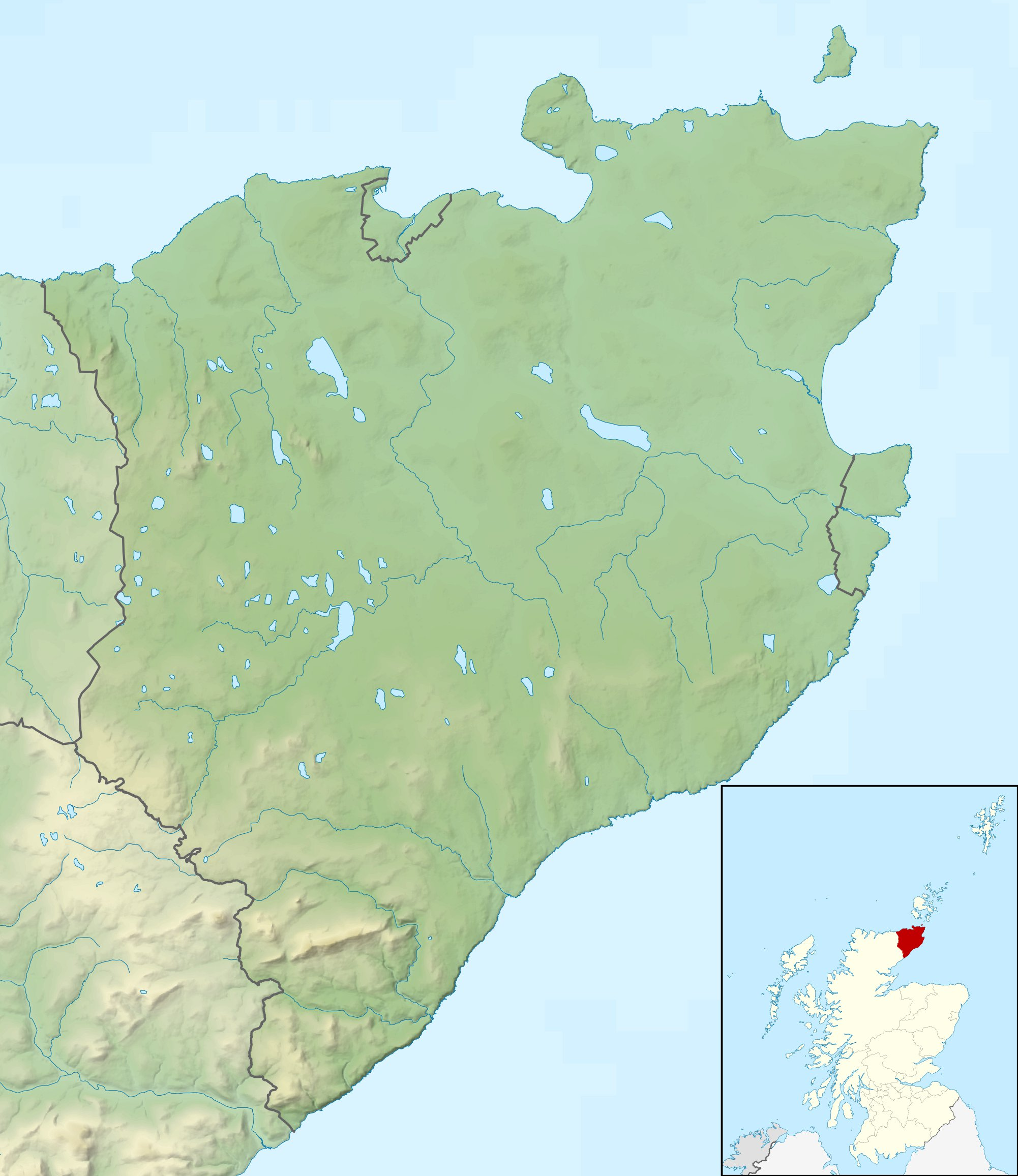
- Location within Caithness
- Location: Caithness
- Coordinates: 58°22′39.7″N 3°10′55.4″W
- Primary inflows: Burn of Brickigoe
- Primary outflows: Burn of Thrumster
- Basin countries: Scotland, United Kingdom
- Max. length: 1.139 km (0.708 mi)
- Max. width: 573.90 m (1,882.9 ft)
- Surface elevation: 94.5 m (310 ft)

The Loch of Yarrows is a freshwater loch and reservoir in Caithness, Scotland, around 2.46 km southwest of the settlement of Thrumster.

The loch is well known for the archaeological relics surrounding it. Just off its northeast shore are the remains of a crannog, and on its southwest shore is a Pictish broch, dating from sometime between 200BCE and 200AD. Just 1.35 km south of the loch is a chambered cairn believed to date to the Neolithic period. The basin surrounding the loch has been inhabited since the Mesolithic period.

An 1872 Ordnance Survey map lists the loch's name as "Yarehouse". Its etymology is unknown, though probably Old Norse in origin.
