= Knotty =

Scottish sport

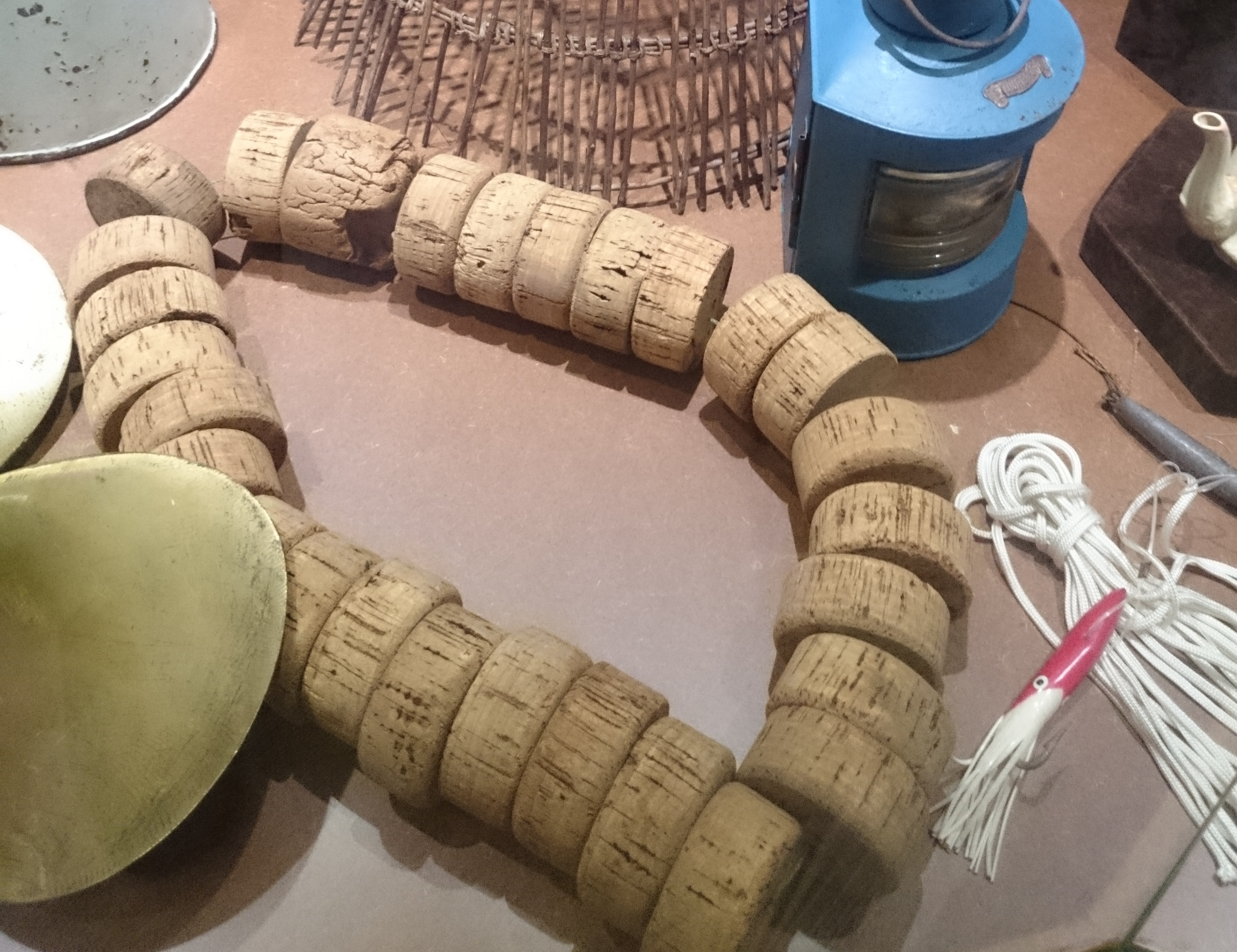
Cork fishing floats

Knotty is a Scottish team sport played with sticks and a cork fishing float. It is a variation of the game of shinty as played in the fishing communities of Lybster, Caithness. It used to be played widely in the town, as was shinty in the rest of Caithness, but it ceased to be played around the end of the 19th century, until 1993 when it was revived by local enthusiasts.

It involves a stick (a "knotty"), which can be almost any form of wooden implement, and a cork fishing float as ball with varying sizes of players. Local history books suggest knotty was invented by the fishing wives of Lybster – once one of the Europe's busiest herring ports – to help keep their men sober when they were ashore. The sport draws from the same prevalence of stick-ball games throughout Scotland at that time, many of which became codified into shinty in other areas.

With the rundown of the industry in the late 19th century, knotty fell into abeyance until local hotelier, Bert Mowat, found the rules for the game in an old Gaelic bible.

== World Championship ==
The Knotty World Championship takes place in Lybster every year, Sinclair Bay Hotel of Keiss being 2006 champions. In 2006, the lack of cork floats made in the traditional style was seen as a threat to the continuation of the sport.

The championship has not been held in a few years but the local shinty side still maintain the tradition with a new year game.
