= Lybster railway station =

Railway station in Highland, Scotland

Lybster
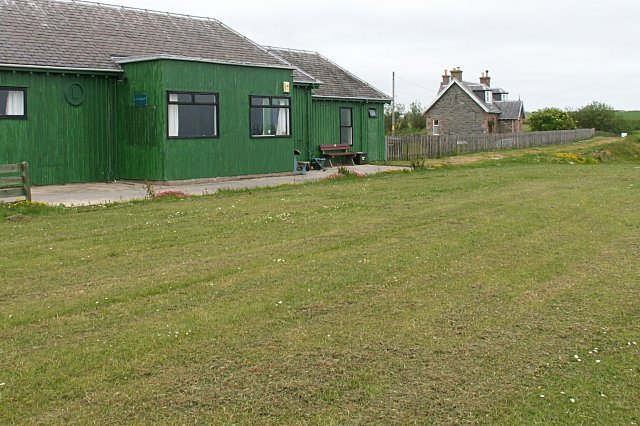
- Lybster railway station in 2008

General information
- Location: Lybster, Highland; Scotland
- Coordinates: 58.3045°N 3.2841°W
- Platforms: 1

Other information
- Status: Disused

History
- Opened: 1 July 1903; 122 years ago
- Closed: 3 April 1944; 81 years ago
- Original company: Wick and Lybster Railway
- Pre-grouping: Wick and Lybster Railway operated by Highland Railway
- Post-grouping: LMS
Location

Lybster was a railway station located on the Wick and Lybster Railway in the Highland area of Scotland. The station building now serves as the clubhouse for the Lybster golf course

== History ==
The station was opened as part of the Wick and Lybster Railway on 1 July 1903.

The station had a loop, a goods yard with several sidings and a 1½ ton crane to the south of the passenger facilities and a turntable accessed from the goods yard.

The station was host to a LMS caravan from 1937 to 1938.

As with the other stations on the line, the station was closed from 3 April 1944.

Preceding station	Disused railways	Following station
Terminus	Highland Railway; Wick and Lybster Light Railway	Parkside Halt; Station and Line closed
