= Killiecrankie railway station =

Disused railway station in Killiecrankie, Perth and Kinross

Killiecrankie

General information
- Location: Killiecrankie, Perth and Kinross; Scotland
- Coordinates: 56.744382°N 3.779705°W
- Grid reference: NN912627
- Platforms: 2

Other information
- Status: Disused

History
- Original company: Inverness and Perth Junction Railway
- Pre-grouping: Highland Railway
- Post-grouping: London, Midland and Scottish Railway; British Rail (Scottish Region)

Key dates
- 1 July 1864: Opened
- 3 May 1965: Closed
Location

The Killiecrankie railway station served the village of Killiecrankie, Perth and Kinross, Scotland from 1864 to 1965.

== History ==
The station was opened on 1 July 1864 by the Inverness and Perth Junction Railway (I&PJn). The line through the station site had been built earlier, opening on 9 September 1863 when the I&PJn opened the section from Aviemore to Pitlochry.

On 28 June 1865 the I&PJn amalgamated with the Inverness and Aberdeen Junction Railway to form the Highland Railway.

The goods yard was situated south of the line and was able to handle most types of goods including live stock.

On Saturday 13 February 1915 the 8.40am express train from Inverness to Perth derailed at the south end of Killiecrankie station. Three vehicles left the rails close to the River Garry which runs fifty feet below the railway embankment. A fourth vehicle left the rails in the middle of the tunnel, 200 yards further on but remained upright. The accident was attributed to one wagon having left the rails passing Blair Atholl, thus fouling the points at Killiecrankie North. The forward part of the train continued to Perth, but the line was blocked for 12 hours.

There were two signal boxes: the north box was on the south side of the line and the south box was opposite the goods yard; these boxes closed 1920 and 1963 respectively. A camping coach was positioned here by the Scottish Region from 1962 to 1963.

The station closed to passengers on 3 May 1965 when local passenger services between Perth and Inverness were withdrawn.

== Stationmasters ==
- Donald Mackenzie from 1877
- F.R. Yeates from 1879
- James A. Riach 1882 - 1884 (afterwards station master at Lenzie)
- John Fraser 1889 - 1890
- Mr. Craig until 1894 (afterwards station master at Hopeman)
- Mr. Macbeath from 1894
- William McKay ca. 1899 - 1914 (afterwards station master at Alves)
- Arthur C. Ross 1914 - 1931 (afterwards station master at Kildary)
- George Petrie from 1944

| Preceding station | Historical railways | Following station |
|---|---|---|
| Black Island Platform; Line open, station closed | Highland Railway; Inverness and Perth Junction Railway | Pitlochry; Line and station open |
