= Sarclet =

Township in Caithness, Scotland

Coordinates: 58.37583°N 3.10917°W

Sarclet: Scottish Gaelic: Sarcleit
- Location within the Caithness area
- OS grid reference: ND352435
- Council area: Highland
- Lieutenancy area: Caithness
- Country: Scotland
- Sovereign state: United Kingdom
- Post town: Thrumster
- Postcode district: KW1 5
- Police: Scotland
- Fire: Scottish
- Ambulance: Scottish
- UK Parliament: Caithness, Sutherland and Easter Ross
- Scottish Parliament: Caithness, Sutherland and Ross

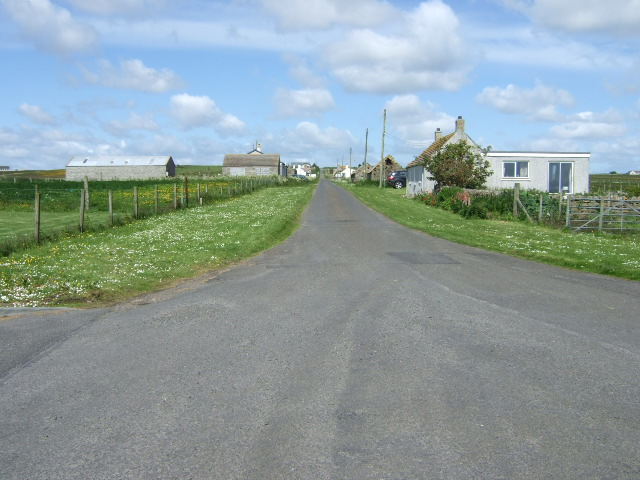
Entry to Sarclet

Sarclet is a remote clifftop crofting township, situated on the east coast of Caithness, lying slightly north of Loch Sarclet in the Scottish Highlands and is in the Scottish council area of Highland.

Sarclet Head extends into the sea and is 0.5 miles to the southeast of the township. Sarclet has a natural harbour called The Haven which was formerly used by fishing boats, but is now largely unused.

The village of Thrumster lies 0.5 miles north west, with Wick located 5 north of the township.

== Decoy Site ==
Sarclet was a location for a Q/QF large-scale night-time decoy airfield during World War II, that were used to simulate burning cities. The site was used to provide some protection for Wick.

== Fishing ==
The Annual Reports of the Fishery Board for Scotland provide an insight into fishing in Whaligoe and Sarclet in the years before the First World War. The statistics do not indicate which place was more important. In the report for 1909 it was stated that cod and crabs were the principal kind of fish landed"..

Fishery Statistics

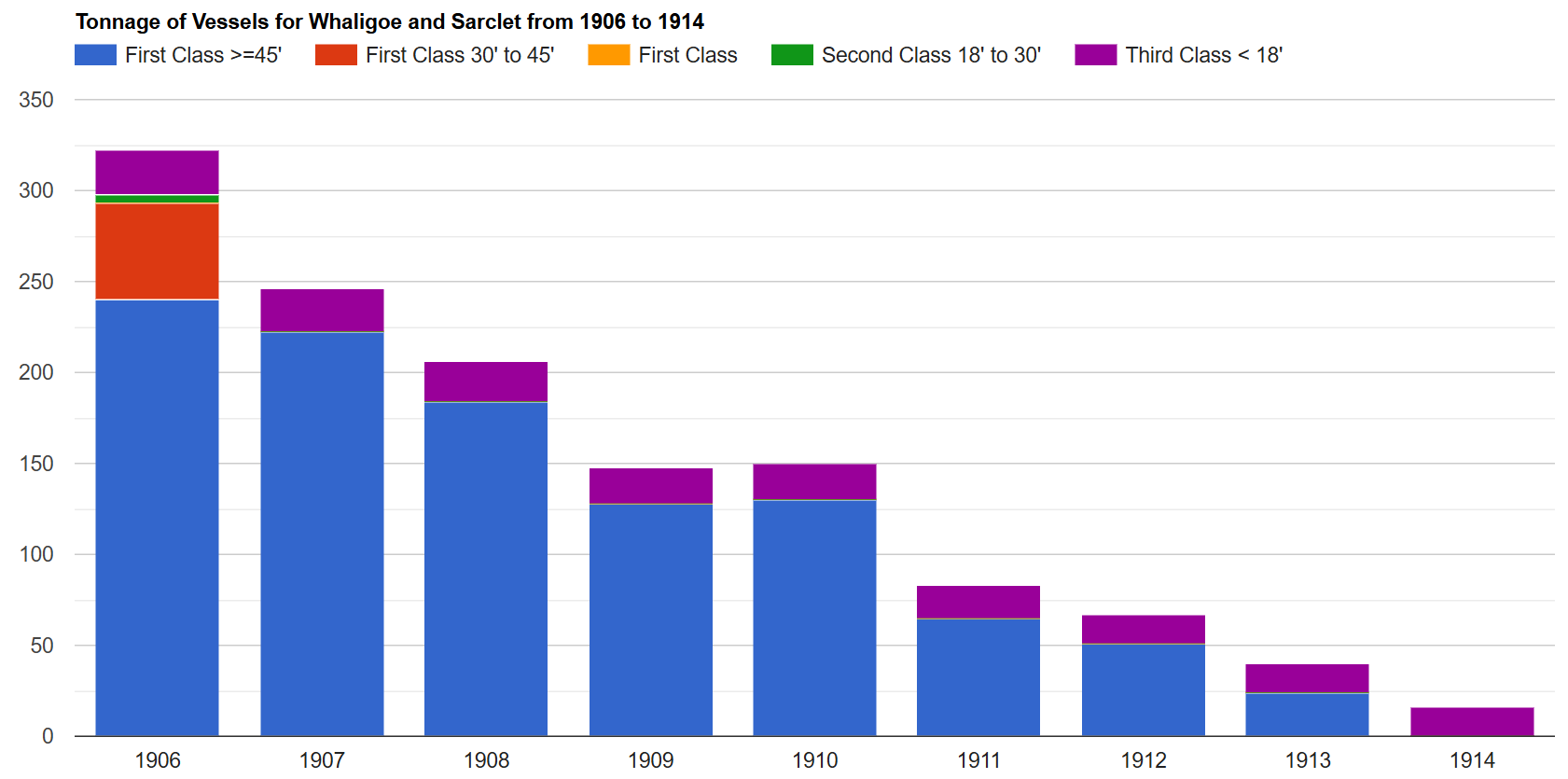
Tonnage of vessels

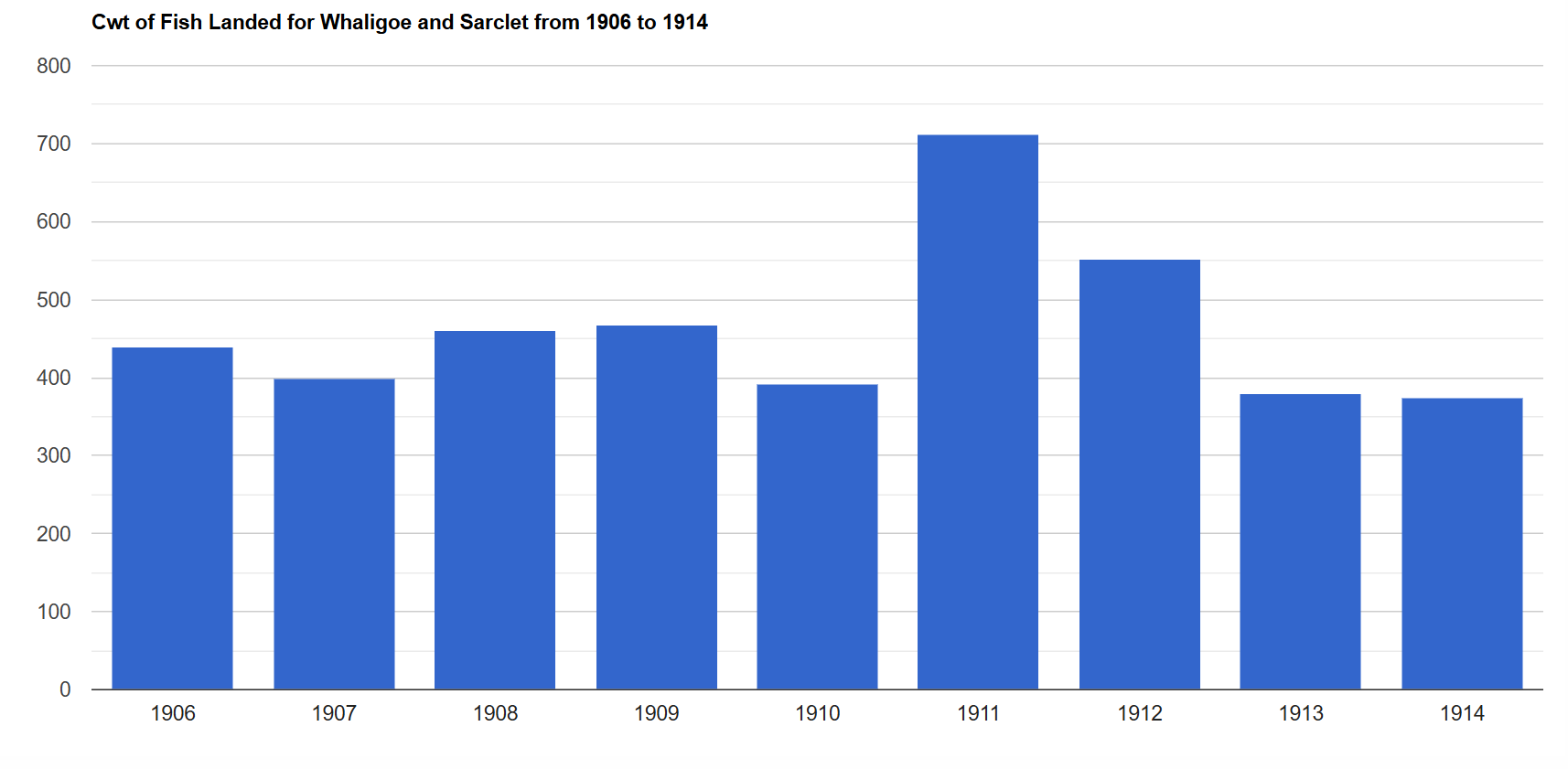
Cwt of fish landed

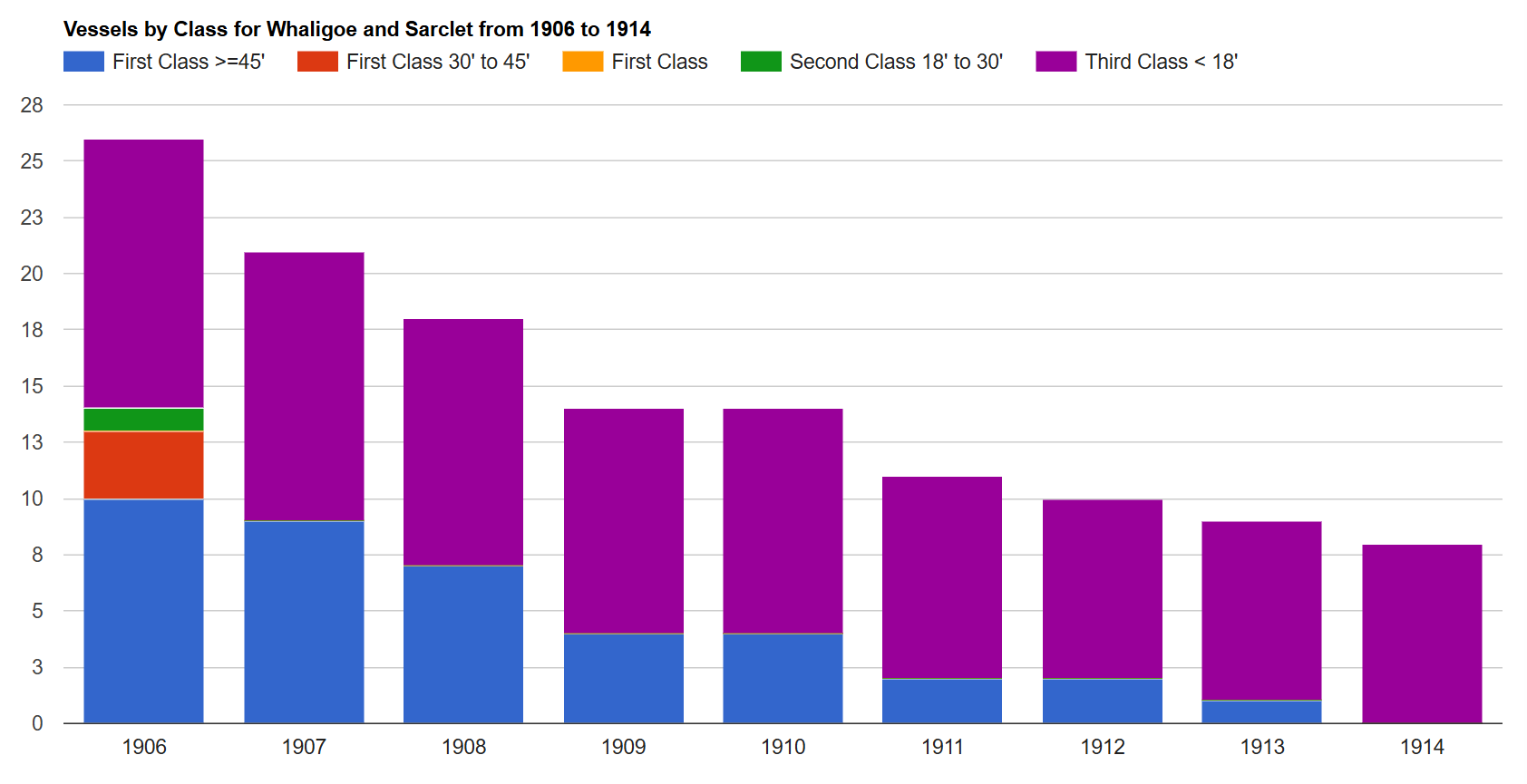
Vessels by class

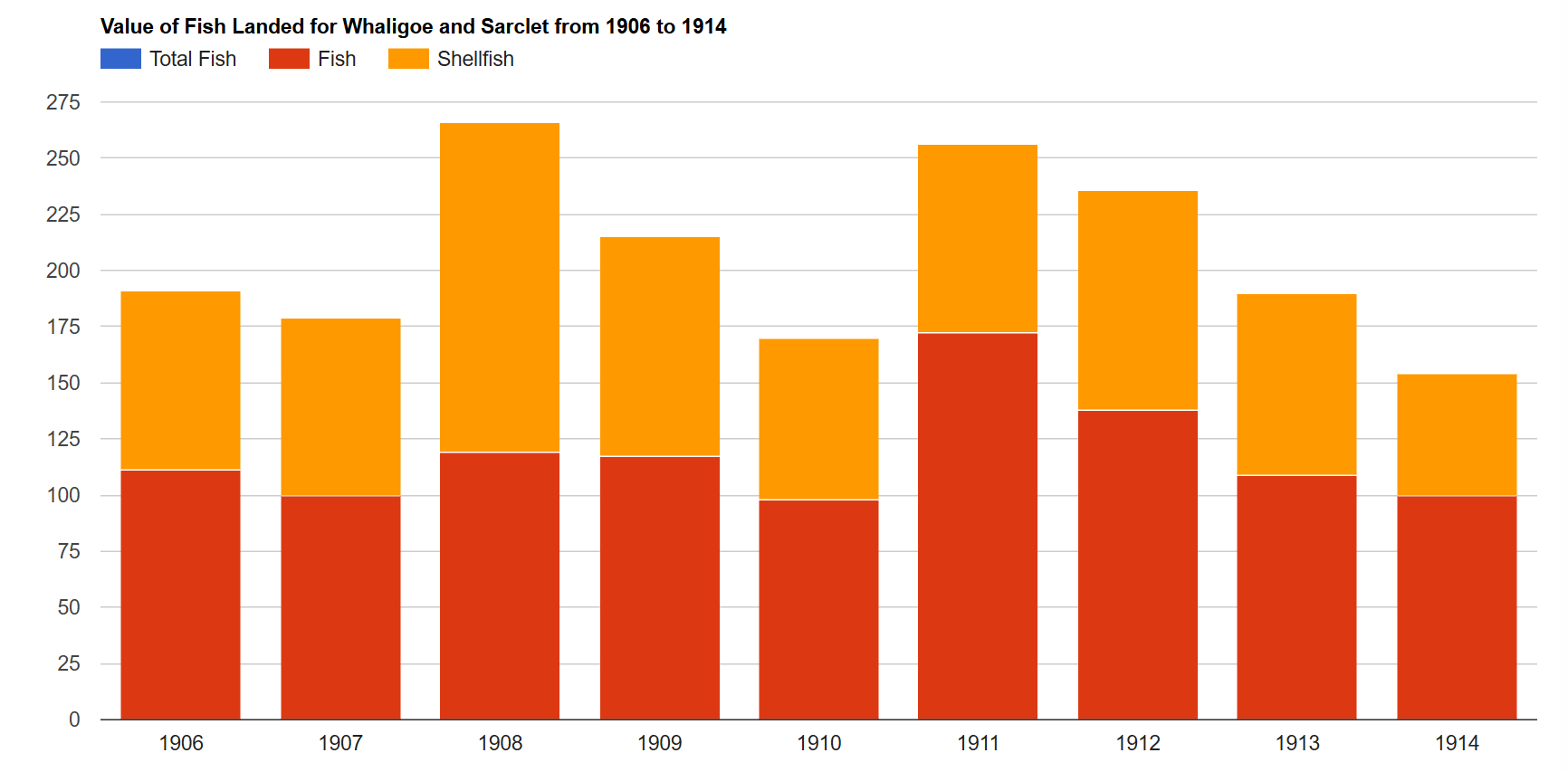
Value (£) of fish landed

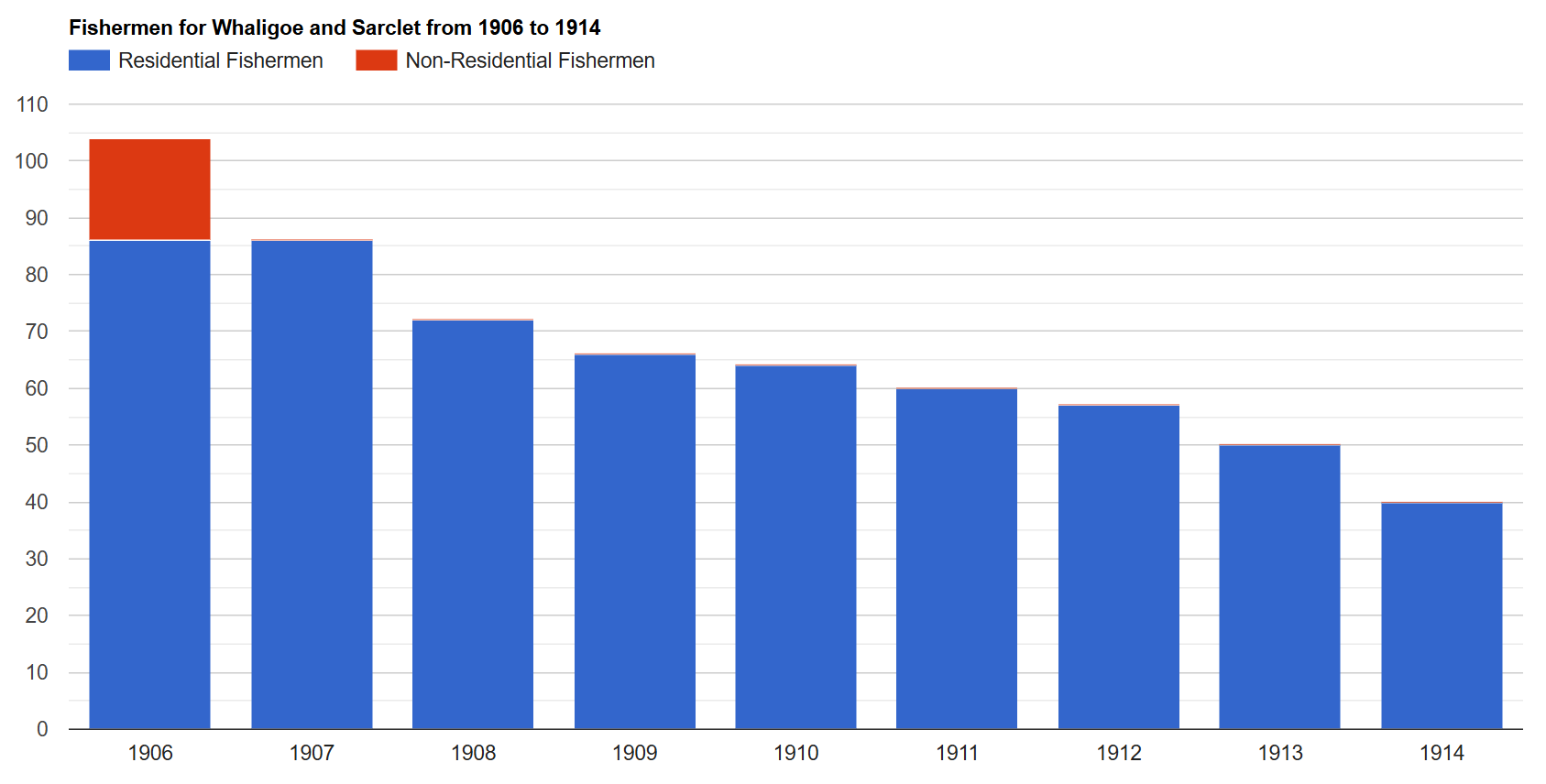
Fishermen

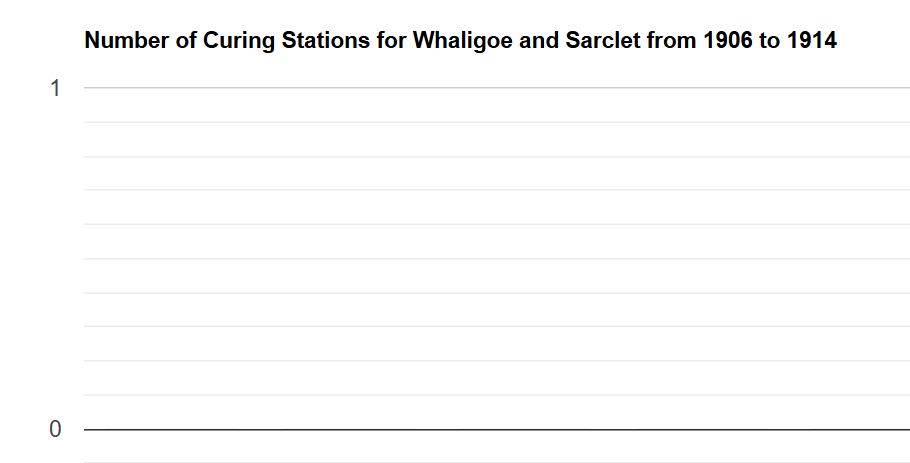
Placeholder - no curing stations
