= Thrumster railway station =

Railway station in Highland, Scotland

Coordinates: 58.3901°N 3.1362°W

Thrumster
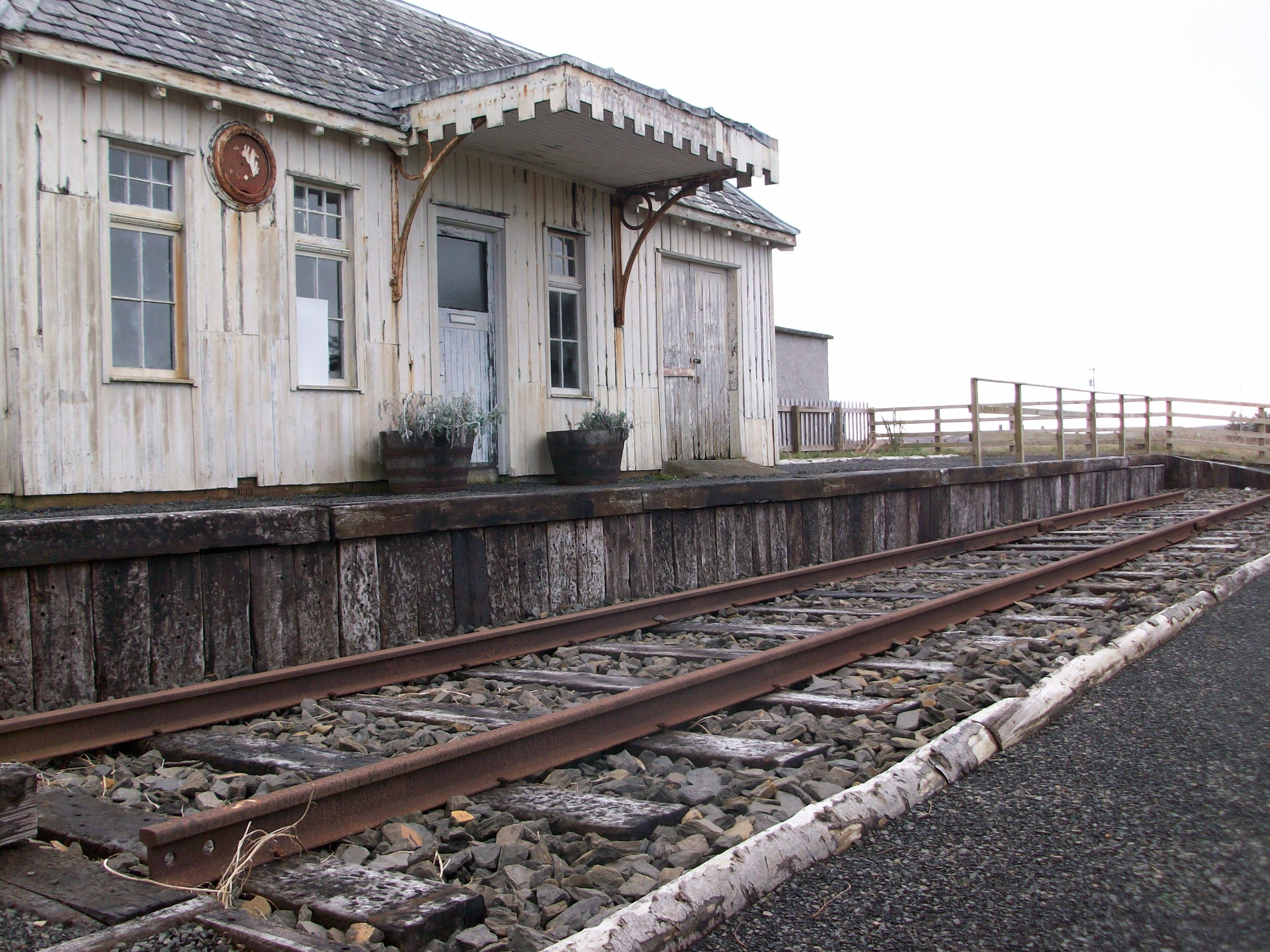
- Outside shot of Thrumster station

General information
- Location: Thrumster, Highland; Scotland
- Platforms: 1

Other information
- Status: Disused

History
- Opened: 1 July 1903; 122 years ago
- Closed: 3 April 1944; 82 years ago
- Original company: Wick and Lybster Railway
- Pre-grouping: Wick and Lybster Railway operated by Highland Railway
- Post-grouping: LMS
Location

Thrumster was a railway station located at Thrumster, Highland, Scotland between Wick and Lybster. The station building can still be seen alongside the main road in Thrumster.

In July 2023, "Thrumster Railway Station is officially switched on" and has become "the farthest north heritage station in the UK."

== History ==
Latitude: 58° 23' 23.82" N Longitude: -3° 08' 10.75" W

The station was opened as part of the Wick and Lybster Railway on 1 July 1903. It was one of the five stations along the line. The Railway was shown in Schedule one of the RailwayAct 1921 as being part of part of The North Western, Midland, and West Scottish Group.

As with the other stations on the line, the station was closed from 3 April 1944. It began to be used as a post office

In 2011, Yarrows Heritage Trust restored the railway.

Preceding station	Disused railways	Following station
Welsh's Crossing Halt; Station and Line closed	Highland Railway; Wick and Lybster Light Railway	Wick; Station open; Line closed
