= Ulbster railway station =

Railway station in Highland, Scotland

Coordinates: 58.3494°N 3.1670°W

Ulbster

General information
- Location: Ulbster, Highland; Scotland
- Platforms: 1

Other information
- Status: Disused

History
- Opened: 1 July 1903; 122 years ago
- Closed: 3 April 1944; 81 years ago
- Original company: Wick and Lybster Railway
- Pre-grouping: Wick and Lybster Railway operated by Highland Railway
- Post-grouping: LMS
Location

Ulbster was a railway station located at Ulbster, Highland, between Wick and Lybster.

== History ==
The station was opened as part of the Wick and Lybster Railway on 1 July 1903. As with the other stations on the line, the station was closed to passenger traffic from 3 April 1944. It was closed to goods traffic on 1 December 1951.

The site is now largely grassed over. The former station master's house is a private dwelling.

Preceding station	Disused railways	Following station
Mid Clyth; Station and Line closed	Highland Railway; Wick and Lybster Light Railway	Welsh's Crossing Halt; Station and Line closed
