= Struan railway station =

Disused railway station in Struan, Perthshire

Struan

General information
- Location: Struan, Perthshire; Scotland
- Coordinates: 56.76726°N 3.96535°W
- Grid reference: NN799656
- Platforms: 2

Other information
- Status: Disused

History
- Original company: Inverness and Perth Junction Railway
- Pre-grouping: Highland Railway
- Post-grouping: London, Midland and Scottish Railway

Key dates
- 9 September 1863: Opened
- 3 May 1965: Closed
Location

Struan railway station served the village of Struan, Perthshire, Scotland from 1863 to 1965 on the Inverness and Perth Junction Railway.

== History ==
The station was opened on 9 September 1863 by the Inverness and Perth Junction Railway.

On 4 September 1877 a goods trains from Inverness was travelling between Dalnaspidal and Struan when 17 of the wagons became detached from the train owing to a failure of a coupling. As it was dark, the driver could not see what had happened but brought the front part of the train to a halt at Struan station. The detached portion was behind him on the descent and ran into the stationary front portion. Many wagons were destroyed and 18 sheep and 6 pigs were killed. The guard, Malcolm M’Farlane was badly injured and conveyed to Dr Irvine in Pitlochry.

In the early hours of Thursday 21 October 1897 a fire broke out which destroyed the station office and the station master's house. The damage to the telegraph wires caused considerable delay to the morning traffic.

The station had two platforms and originally there were also two signal boxes; these were replaced by a single box when the line was doubled in 1900.

The station closed to both passengers and goods traffic on 3 May 1965.

Preceding station	Historical railways	Following station
Black Island Platform; Line open, station closed	Highland Railway; Inverness and Perth Junction Railway	Dalnaspidal; Line open, station closed
