= Thrumster, Caithness =

Township in Caithness, Scotland

Coordinates: 58.3888°N 3.12993°W

Thrumster
- Location within the Caithness area
- OS grid reference: ND340450
- Council area: Highland
- Lieutenancy area: Caithness
- Country: Scotland
- Sovereign state: United Kingdom
- Post town: Thrumster
- Postcode district: KW1 5
- Police: Scotland
- Fire: Scottish
- Ambulance: Scottish
- UK Parliament: Caithness, Sutherland and Easter Ross
- Scottish Parliament: Caithness, Sutherland and Ross

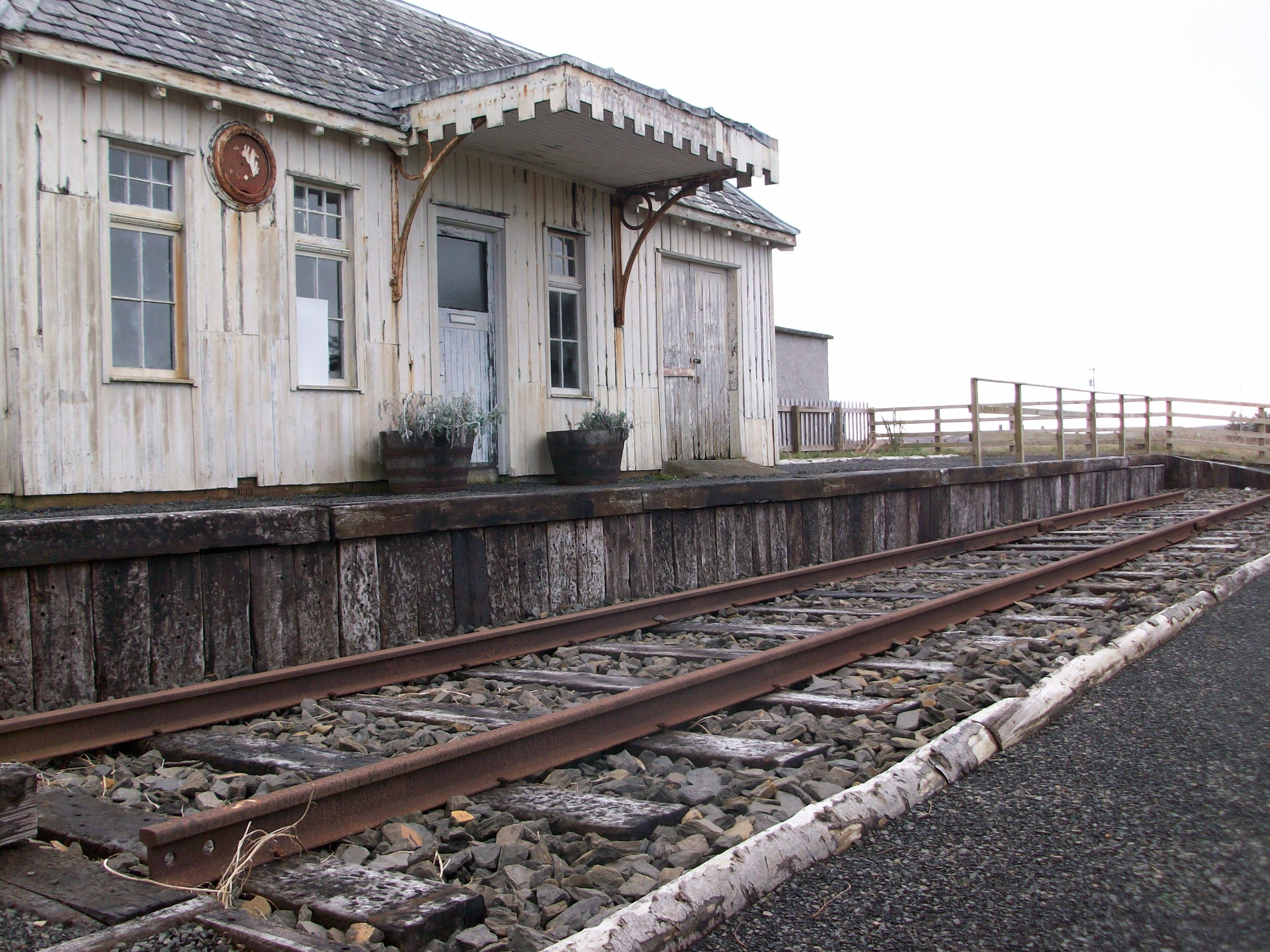
Thrumster railway station

Thrumster is a crofting township on the main A99 road between Wick and Inverness. It is the nearest village to Wick. The transmission mast used to broadcast BBC television and radio signals to Caithness was located here until 1960.

The village had a railway station until trains stopped running on the Wick and Lybster Railway in 1944. The station has been preserved. Around 500 m (550 yd) south is Thrumster Parish Church, part of the Church of Scotland charge of Pulteneytown and Thrumster.

The township of Sarclet is situated 1/2 mile (800 m) to the southeast.

== Features ==
Near Thrumster House is a standing stone, that affirms the legend that Margaret, Maid of Norway, Norwegian princess, who was heiress of the Scottish Town, was wrecked on this coast on her return to Scotland, and buried under the Standing-Stane o' Thrumster.
