= Black Island Platform railway station =

Disused railway station in Scotland

Black Island Platform

General information
- Location: Blair Atholl, Perth and Kinross; Scotland
- Coordinates: 56.7674°N 3.8714°W
- Grid reference: NN857655
- Platforms: 2

Other information
- Status: Disused

History
- Original company: Inverness and Perth Junction Railway
- Pre-grouping: Highland Railway
- Post-grouping: London, Midland and Scottish Railway

Key dates
- 1904: Opened
- 11 April 1959: Station closed
Location

Black Island Platform railway station, Blair Atholl, Perth and Kinross, Scotland, was located at an area known as the Black Island beside the River Garry. The station was used during WWII by forestry workers and was not open for use by the general public. Standing on the old Inverness and Perth Junction Railway route it lay 36 mi 16 chains (58.3 km) from Perth railway station.

== History ==
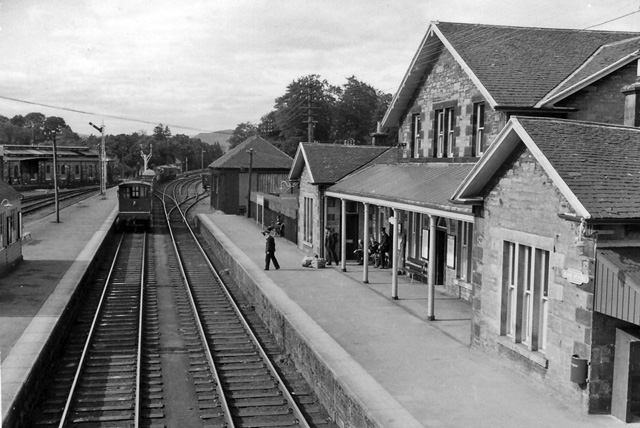
Blair Atholl station in 1962 looking west towards Black Island

The station appears to have opened in 1904 when it is mentioned in the Strathern Herald for 11 June 1904 in relation to the camp of the Scottish Horse at Blair Atholl.

The preparations for the camp of the Scottish Horse at Blair Atholl are being pushed forwards with all expedition. At the level crossing at the Black Island large wicket gates, capable of admitting bicycles, have been erected, while the ground on the south side of the railway has been lowered four feet to admit of easy access of vehicular traffic. To the north of the crossing a substantial platform of about 200 feet in length has been erected by the railway company who intend to run the special trains conveying the troopers and their horses right out to the Black Island platform. Behind the platform a space has been enclosed, presumably to facilitate entraining operations.

The CFC had also worked in Scotland during WWI and on the 1927 OS map, a large number of apparent forestry buildings are shown. No 5 Company of the Canadian Forestry Corps were stationed here in WWII. The RAF photographed the camp and station site in May 1941.

The CFC also had a military role and they were responsible for preparing anti-invasion defensive positions in their, working with the army. The station officially closed in 1959, some fourteen years after the CFC left. One reference gives the closure date as 1951.

== Infrastructure ==
A simple structure of wooden platforms on this double track section of line is most likely given the nature of the camp it served. It is unclear whether or not it was open at the time of the Highland Railway before that company became part of the London, Midland and Scottish Railway. The camp site was accessed via a junction off the A9.

Nothing substantial now remains of the station or the forty or so Nissen and other huts that formed the forestry corps camp.

== Forestry operations ==
The foresters worked in two groups, one cutting in the woods and retrieving the timber, the other processing it at the saw mill. On August 31, 1945, the Canadian Forestry Corps was disbanded after the cessation of hostilities and returned home. The Corps at its peak consisted of 220 officers and 6771 other ranks.

| Preceding station | Historical railways | Following station |
|---|---|---|
| Blair Atholl; Line open, station open | Highland Railway; Inverness and Perth Junction Railway | Struan; Line open, station closed |
