= Dalnaspidal railway station =

Disused railway station in Pitlochry, Perthshire

Dalnaspidal
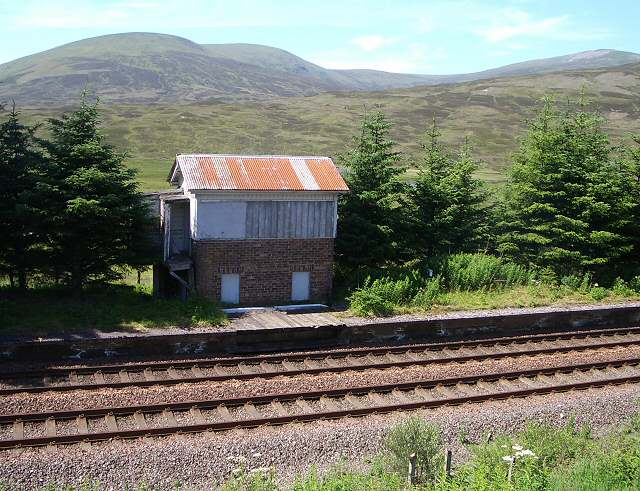
- The site of the station and signal box in 2006

General information
- Location: Pitlochry, Perthshire; Scotland
- Coordinates: 56.8318°N 4.2236°W
- Grid reference: NN644733
- Platforms: 2

Other information
- Status: Disused

History
- Original company: Inverness and Perth Junction Railway
- Pre-grouping: Highland Railway
- Post-grouping: London, Midland and Scottish Railway

Key dates
- June 1864: Opened
- 3 May 1965: Closed
Location

Dalnaspidal railway station served the burgh of Pitlochry, Perthshire, Scotland from 1864 to 1965 on the Inverness and Perth Junction Railway. Located on the section of the route near the summit of the line at Drumochter, it was the highest station on the route at 1405 ft (428 m) above sea level.

== History ==
The station was opened in June 1864 by the Inverness and Perth Junction Railway. The station closed to both passengers and goods traffic on 3 May 1965.

Preceding station	Historical railways	Following station
Struan; Line open, station closed	Highland Railway; Inverness and Perth Junction Railway	Dalwhinnie; Line and station open
