= Ulbster =

Coordinates: 58.35489°N 3.15669°W

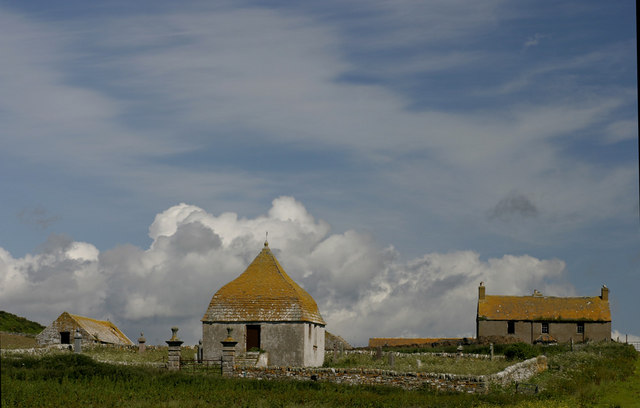
- The Sinclair Mausoleum, with Ulbster Mains in the background

- Location within the Caithness area
- OS grid reference: ND324064
- Council area: Highland
- Lieutenancy area: Caithness
- Country: Scotland
- Sovereign state: United Kingdom
- Post town: LYBSTER
- Postcode district: KW2
- Dialling code: 01955
- Police: Scotland
- Fire: Scottish
- Ambulance: Scottish
- UK Parliament: Caithness, Sutherland and Easter Ross
- Scottish Parliament: Caithness, Sutherland and Ross

Ulbster is a scattered crofting hamlet on the eastern coast of Caithness, within the parish of Wick, in the Scottish Highlands, within the Highland Council area. The town of Wick is located seven miles north of the village along the A99 road. To the south of the village, two miles along the A99, lies the ancient port of Whaligoe, where the famous 330 steps were cut into a cliff on the instruction of Thomas Telford in 1786.

== History ==
Owned for many years by a cadet branch of the Sinclair Earls of Caithness, the hamlet is most notable for the Sinclair Mausoleum, within the grounds of the mediaeval St Martin's Chapel. Sir John, one of the Sinclairs of Ulbster, was a noted statistician who wrote the pioneering work Statistical Accounts of Scotland.

== Naming ==
The name Ulbster comes from the Old Norse ulfr bólstathr meaning 'wolf's dwelling', though there have been no wolves in the region for many years.

== Gallery ==
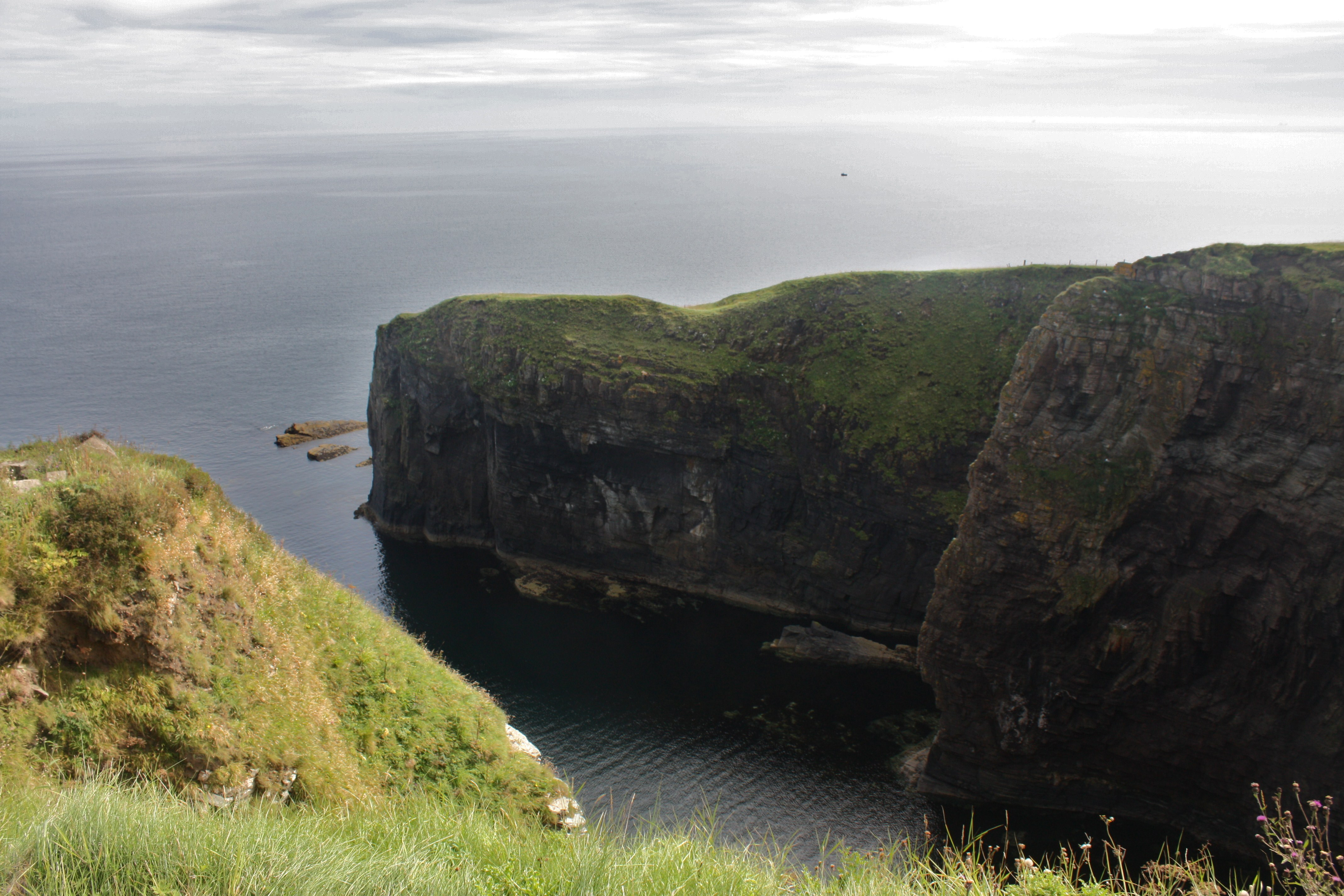
The cliffs and harbour at Whaligoe.

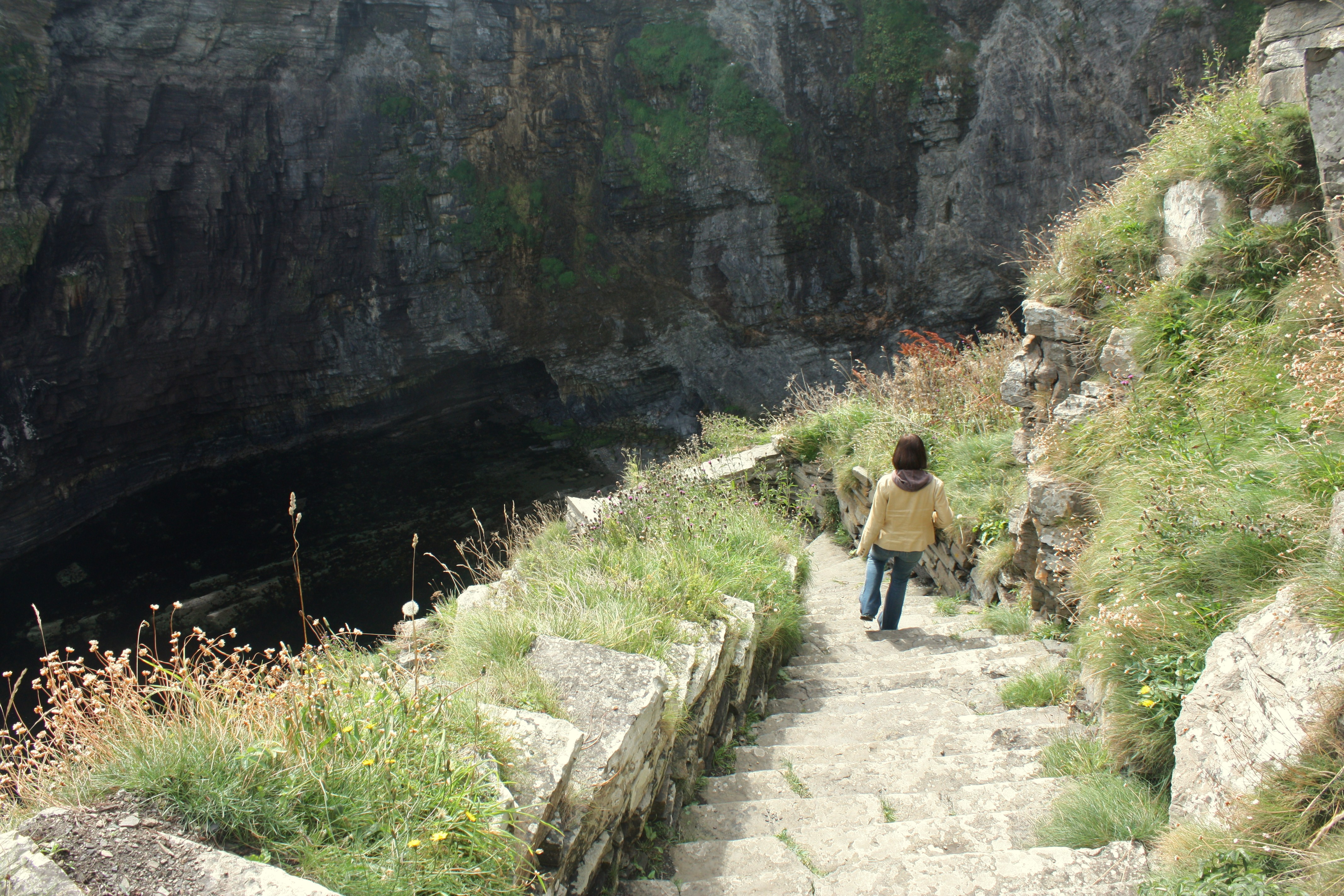
Descending the Whaligoe Steps.

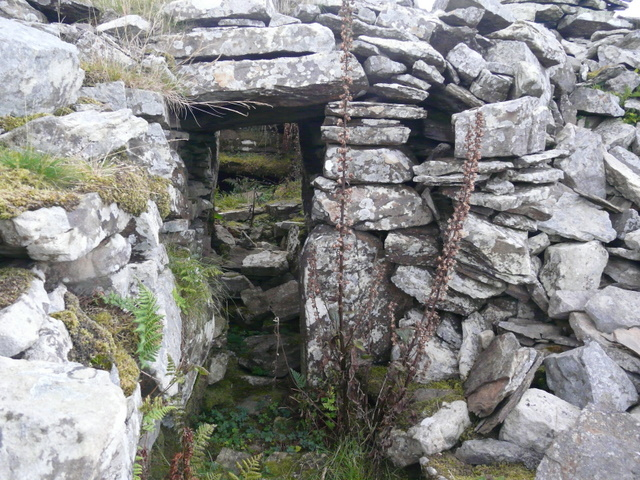
Entrance to "Long Cairn" at Yarrows slightly north of Ulbster.

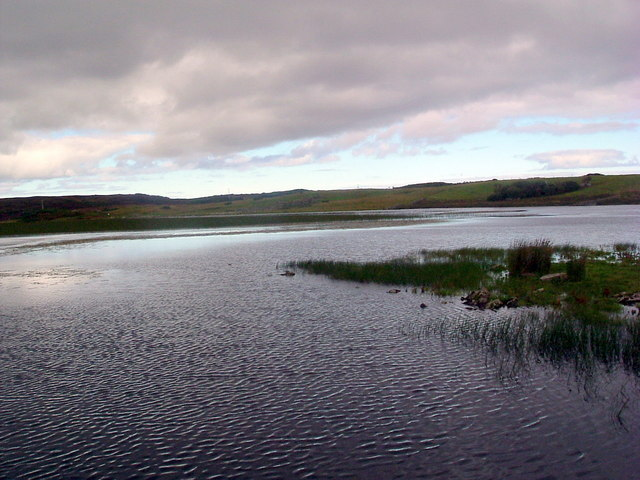
Loch Waternan north end, next to Ulbster.

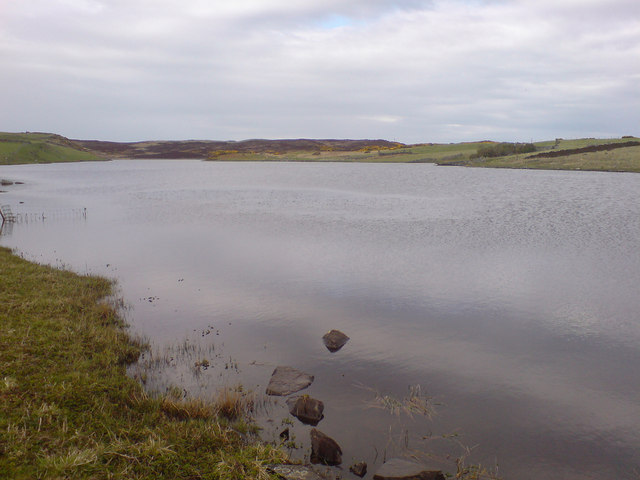
Loch Watenan is a freshwater loch, located in basin that may have been caused by ice erosion.

== See also ==
- Ulbster railway station
