= Wick and Lybster Light Railway =

Former railway line in Scotland

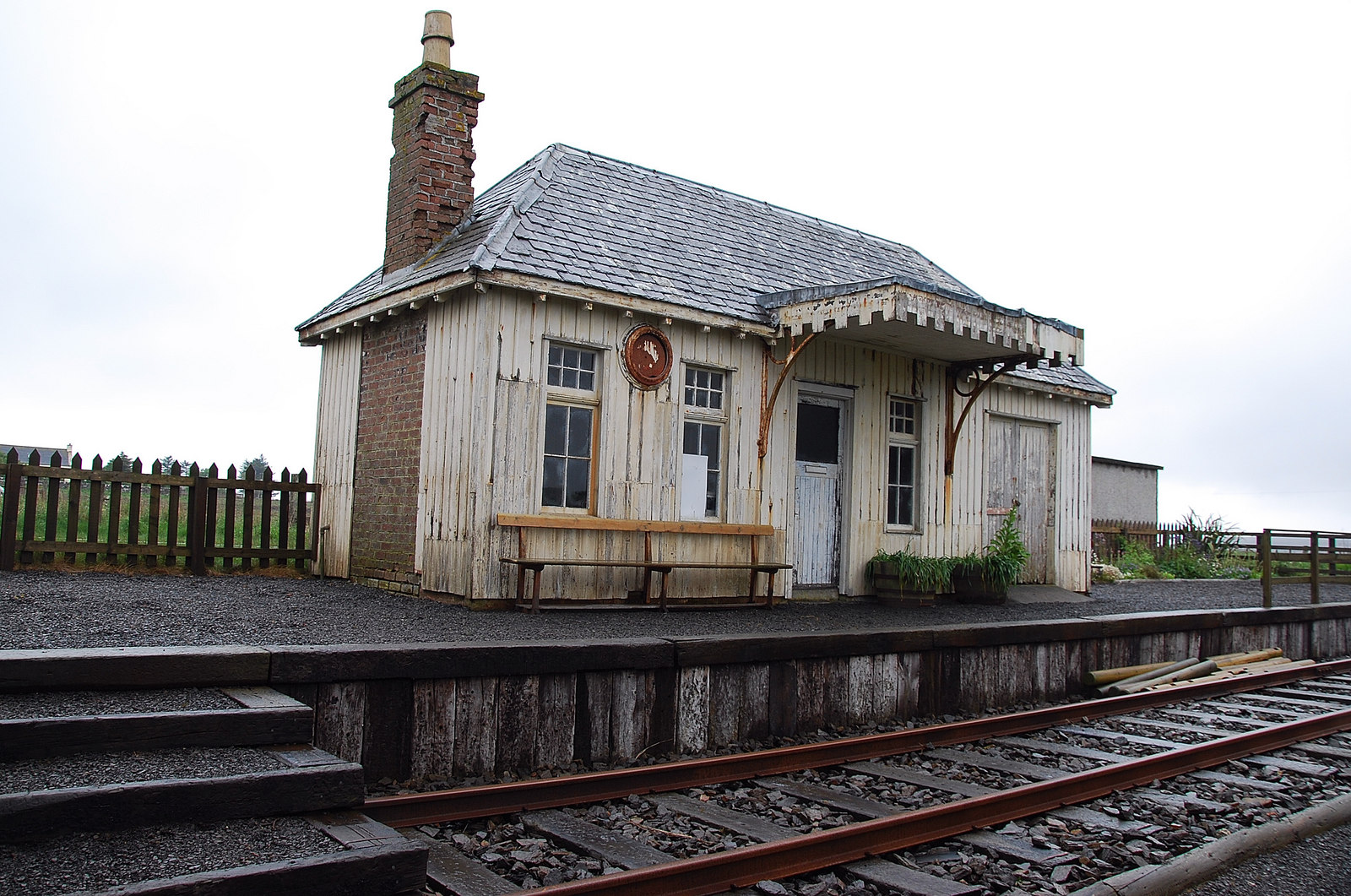
- Remains of Thrumster railway station

Overview
- Locale: Scotland
- Stations: 8

History
- Opened: 1 July 1903
- Closed: 3 April 1944

Technical
- Line length: 13 miles 39 chains (21.7 km)
- Track gauge: 4 ft 8 1/2 in (1,435 mm)

The Wick and Lybster Light Railway (W&LLR) was a light railway opened in 1903, with the intention of opening up the fishing port of Lybster, in Caithness, Scotland, to the railway network at Wick. Its construction was heavily supported financially by local government and the Treasury. It was worked by the Highland Railway.

The line was never heavily used and the anticipated expansion of the fishing trade did not take place. When a modern road to the south was built in the 1930s, transits from Lybster were considerably shorter and quicker by that means, and the railway closed completely in 1944.

== History ==
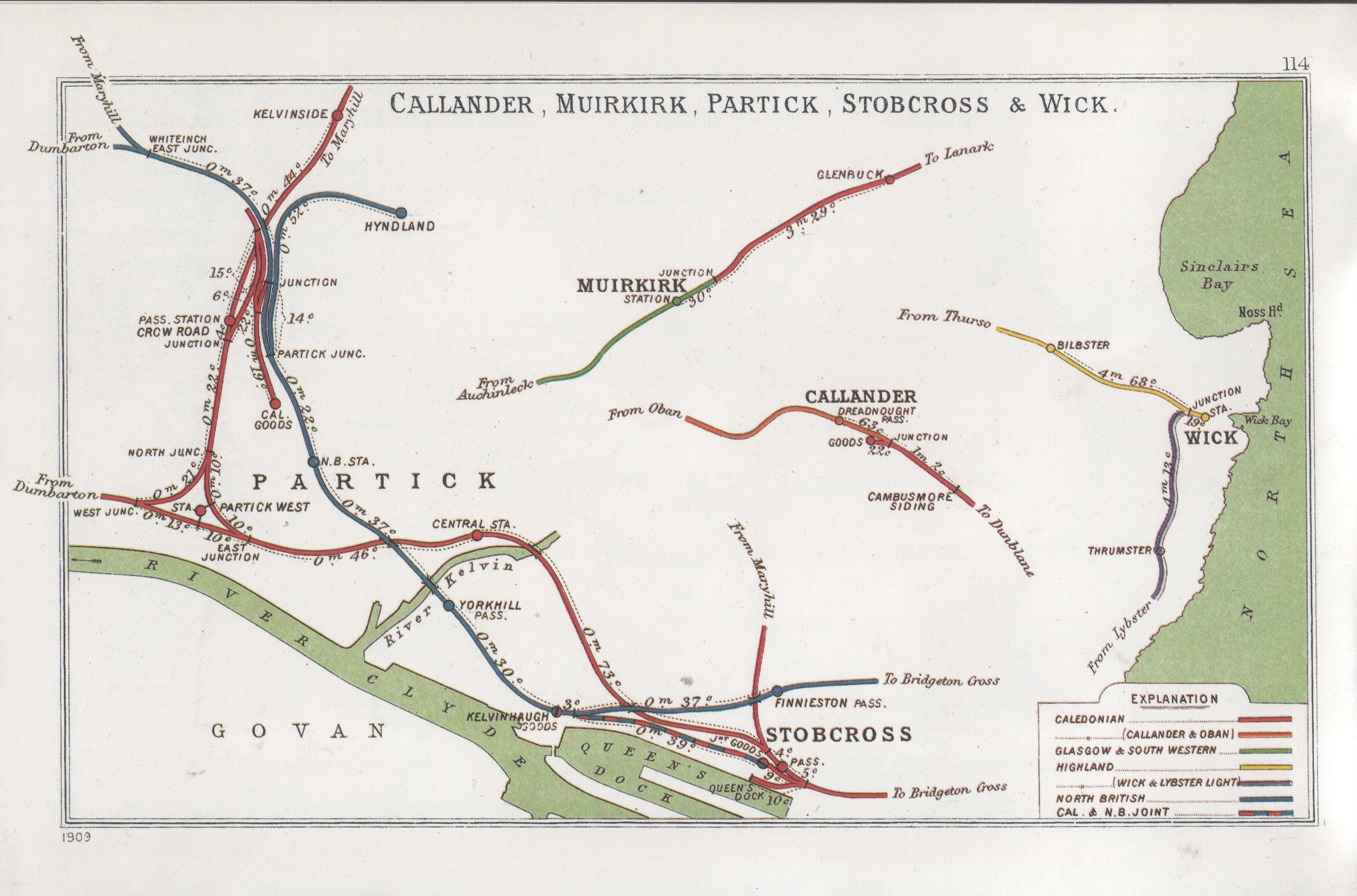
A 1909 Railway Clearing House map showing (right) part of the Wick & Lybster Railway (violet) and the junction at Wick

The fishing village of Lybster lies 13 miles (21 km) to the south of Wick, and up to the end of the nineteenth century it was relatively inaccessible by land. As early as 1864 a railway from Wick through Lybster to Dunbeath had been proposed, but nothing came of the idea at that time.

Parliament passed the Light Railways Act 1896, with the intention of encouraging the construction of low-cost railways to serve such localities.

When a new light railway was proposed connecting Lybster to the main line railway network at Wick, considerable support was expressed locally. Wick was one of the northern termini of the Far North Line from Inverness, owned and operated at the time by the Highland Railway. An application was made for a light railway order; Caithness County Council took the lead in submitting it on 5 March 1896.

The Wick and Lybster Light Railway Order 1899 was granted on 27 November 1899. The capital of the railway company was £30,000, but the anticipated construction cost was considerably more; grants were anticipated from the County Council and HM Treasury.

In the event the Duke of Portland, a substantial landowner in the district, subscribed £15,000, and the Highland Railway £1,000. Caithness County Council "advanced" £15,000, the Corporation of Wick £15,000 and the Corporation of Pulteneytown (later absorbed into Wick) £1,000. The Treasury made a grant of £25,000. (Note: These figures from the contemporary report in the Railway Magazine; Ross says Wick subscribed £1,500, and Pulteneytown £1,500, and the Treasury grant was a loan.) In fact £8,000 of shares remained unsubscribed at 28 March 1900.

The fees of the Board of Trade in granting the order were £1,311. A contract was let to William Kennedy of Partick, Glasgow, for the actual construction.

The Highland Railway agreed to take charge of the construction, but they were clearly unwilling to let any shortfall in funding fall to them. William Whitelaw, the vice-chairman of the Highland Railway, visited Wick and stated that he required personal guarantees from the local directors; those directors were reluctant to accept the commitment, but after reflection they gave the required undertakings. However the Treasury was persuaded to increase its loan by £5,000 in 1900. A working agreement with the Highland Railway was finalised on 27 February 1901. The wrangle had delayed construction by a year.

=== Construction and opening ===
Construction started on 1 April 1901 to the plans by William Roberts, engineer-in-chief to the Highland Railway. The line was subject to an interim inspection by Major Druitt, the Board of Trade Inspector, on 20 August 1902 when he surveyed the first 10 miles (16 km) of the line in a fish-wagon propelled by one of the light engines.

After an inspection by Major Druitt, the line opened on 1 July 1903. On the opening day, the first train left Wick at 11.00am. The engine, christened Lybster, was decorated with bunting, and flags were displayed throughout the town. Mrs Miller, the chairman's wife, signalled the departure of the first train. She was presented with a gold whistle as a memento of the occasion. The inaugural train ran non-stop to Lybster in around 30 minutes.

Three trains ran each way every weekday; the journey took 40 minutes. The maximum permitted speed was 25 mph (40 km/h).

The financial performance of the line was always poor, with the dividend never exceeding 1.5%.

When the burgh of Wick voted to prohibit the sale of alcohol, some passenger traffic was generated by drinkers who travelled to Lybster to do so.

The Wick and Lybster Light Railway Company was simply a financial shell, receiving the working charge from the Highland Railway. The Railways Act 1921 was passed with the aim of grouping the railways of Great Britain; the Highland Railway was a constituent of the new London, Midland and Scottish Railway (LMS) but the W&LLR was simply absorbed; the LMS exchanged £100 ordinary shares in the W&LLR for £12 10s cash; the company was valued at £42,515.

In 1903 an 0-4-4 tank locomotive that had been working on the Strathpeffer branch was transferred to work the Wick and Lybster Light Railway. It had been built in 1890 by David Jones as a saddle tank; it was given a second-hand boiler, and in 1901 it had been altered to a side-tank configuration.

== Topography ==
The line was 13 miles 39 chains (21.7 km) in length, and was single; there were no passing places. There were numerous level crossings on the line.

A new bay platform for the branch trains was provided at Wick station, on the north side of the line. (The main Highland Railway line approaches from the west.) The Lybster line started at a junction just outside the station and curved to the south; it then ran south one mile (1.6 kilometres) or so inland, and then curved west with the coast and converging with it at the terminus, Lybster. There were intermediate stations at Thrumster, Ulbster, Mid Clyth and Occumster.

The terrain is rocky and hilly, and gradients on the line were stiff. From Wick the line rose almost continuously, with a ruling gradient of 1 in 50, to a summit 100 metres (328 ft) above sea level just before the 7 mile post (i.e. 11 km). Undulations followed with equally severe gradients, and the final mile descended into Lybster station, which was at a higher elevation (65 m or 214 ft) than Wick (12 m or 38 ft). The station was located at the north end of the main street, some distance from the harbour.

== Closure ==
The construction of a modern road over the Ord of Caithness in the 1930s was a boost to the area, but it spelt the end of the railway. The distance from Lybster to Helmsdale by rail via Wick was 74 miles (119 km), but by the new road it was just over 20 miles (32 km). The line closed completely after the last train on 1 April 1944. John Skene, who had driven the first train on the opening day of the railway in 1903, started the engine for the last trip on 1 April 1944. A large party gathered at Lybster station for the last train, which was decked with flags for the occasion. By September the Ministry of Transport had begun the process of dismantling the line.

== See also ==
History of the Far North of Scotland Railway Line
