= Lybster =

Village in Caithness, Scotland

Coordinates: 58.30°N 3.28°W

Lybster: Scottish Gaelic: Liabost
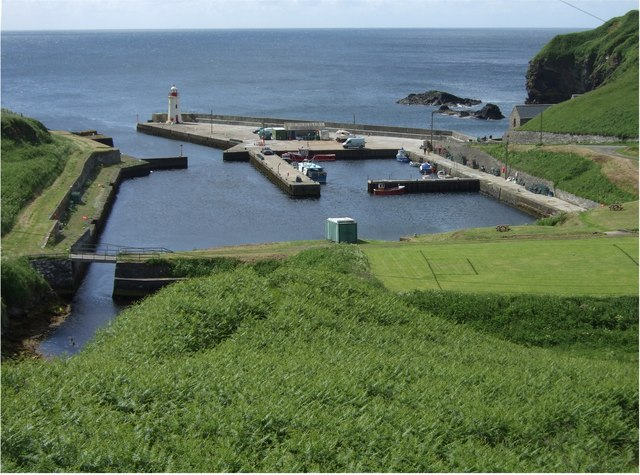
- Lybster Harbour

- Location within the Caithness area
- OS grid reference: ND250360
- Civil parish: Latheron
- Council area: Highland
- Lieutenancy area: Caithness
- Country: Scotland
- Sovereign state: United Kingdom
- Post town: LYBSTER
- Postcode district: KW3
- Dialling code: 01593
- Police: Scotland
- Fire: Scottish
- Ambulance: Scottish
- UK Parliament: Caithness, Sutherland and Easter Ross
- Scottish Parliament: Caithness, Sutherland and Ross

Lybster (/ˈlɪbstər/, Scottish Gaelic: Liabost) is a village on the east coast of Caithness in northern Scotland. It was a big herring fishing port in the 19th century.

The Waterlines heritage museum is located in Lybster Harbour and provides information on the history and geology of Lybster. A small number of crab fishing boats also operate from Lybster Harbour.

Lybster lies at the end of the tenth stage of the John o' Groats Trail, a long-distance footpath from Inverness to John o' Groats.

== History ==
The Lybster area has a long history of human settlement, with the area named in Norse as 'Haligeo'. Lybster owes its current development to the fishing industry. A wooden pier was built in 1790 for use by the fishing boats. The village was founded in 1802 as a planned village by the local landowner General Patrick Sinclair, and his sons continued with its development. The road name Quatre Bras takes its name from the Napoleonic battle in which the sons served in 1815.

In 1838, the population was said to be 1312, and there was a move to build a church there, as worshippers were having to travel either to Latheron or to Bruan, both about 5 mi (8 km) away.

By 1837, 101 boats worked from the harbour By 1859 some 357 boats operated from the harbour, making it the third busiest fishing port in Scotland, only exceeded by Wick and Fraserburgh. By then there were some 1500 fishermen at sea, as well as some fishing industry workers on land. The lighthouse was built in 1884; the fishing industry declined into the early 20th century. Although Lybster had been an important herring port in the 19th century, the fishing port declined in importance in the years before the First World War as the local industry concentrated in Wick, and the number of vessels based in Lybster declined.

Lybster railway station was part of the Wick and Lybster Railway. It opened on 1 July 1903 and closed on 3 April 1944; railway traffic had fallen due to the opening up of the road for traffic and the decline of the herring industry. A white-fish fleet operated from the port in the 1900s, but that dwindled too, and now the harbour is used by fishing boats catching lobsters and crabs, and by recreational craft. The Six-Inch OS Map of Lybster shows the light railway and its relative proxmity to the harbour.

Lybster hosts the "World Championships of Knotty"; knotty or cnatag is a variant of shinty.

The film, Silver Darlings, from Neil Gunn's book, was shot here. In 2019, Lybster was used as a location for shooting the Netflix drama, The Crown.

The Sinclairs of Lybster have long roots running back to the Sinclair earls who ruled Caithness; this included a much larger area, taking in much of Sutherland. Further back, the family has connections to the Norwegian earls who controlled the north of Scotland for centuries.

=== Fishery statistics ===
Fishery Statistics

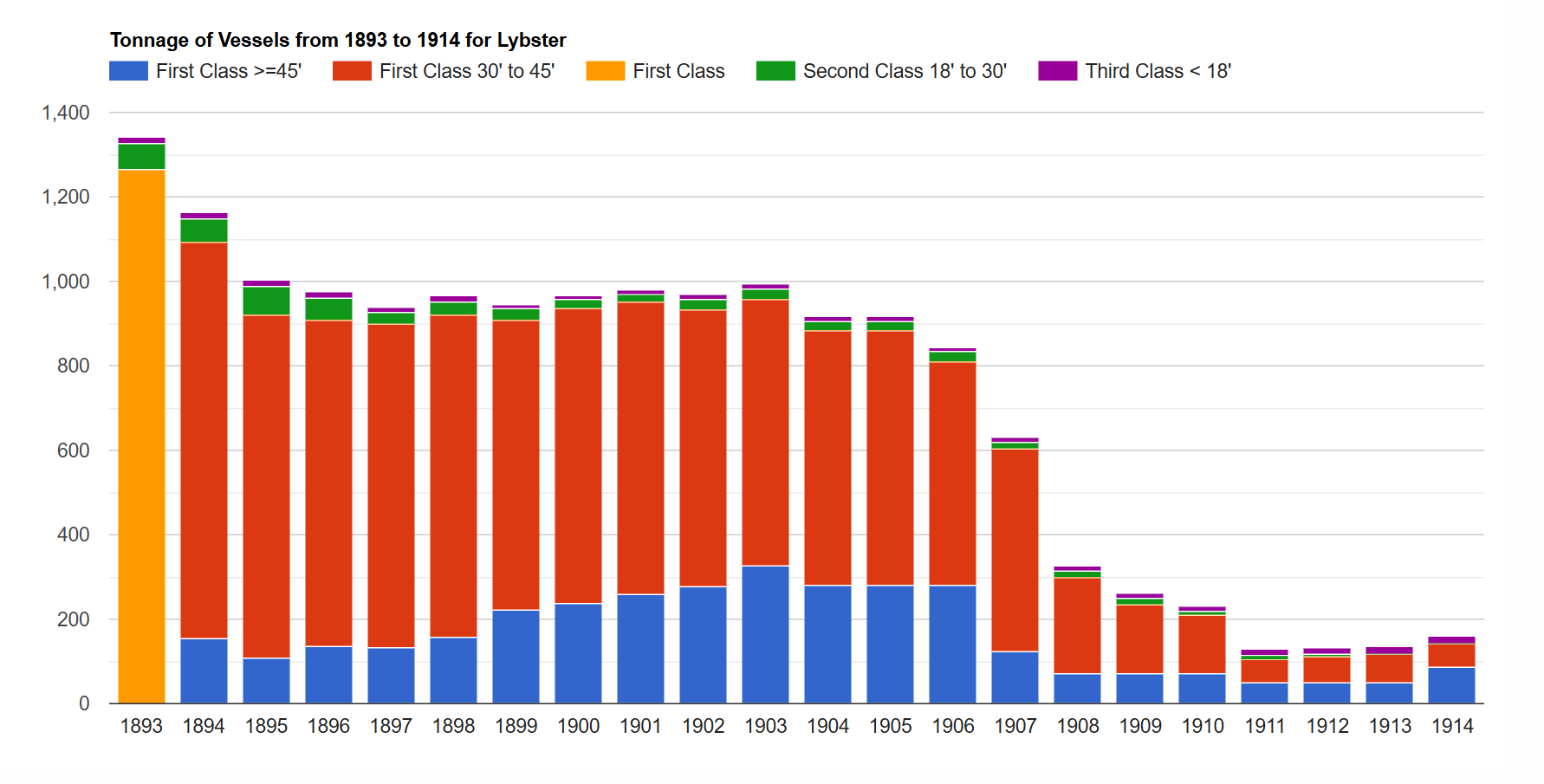
Tonnage of vessels

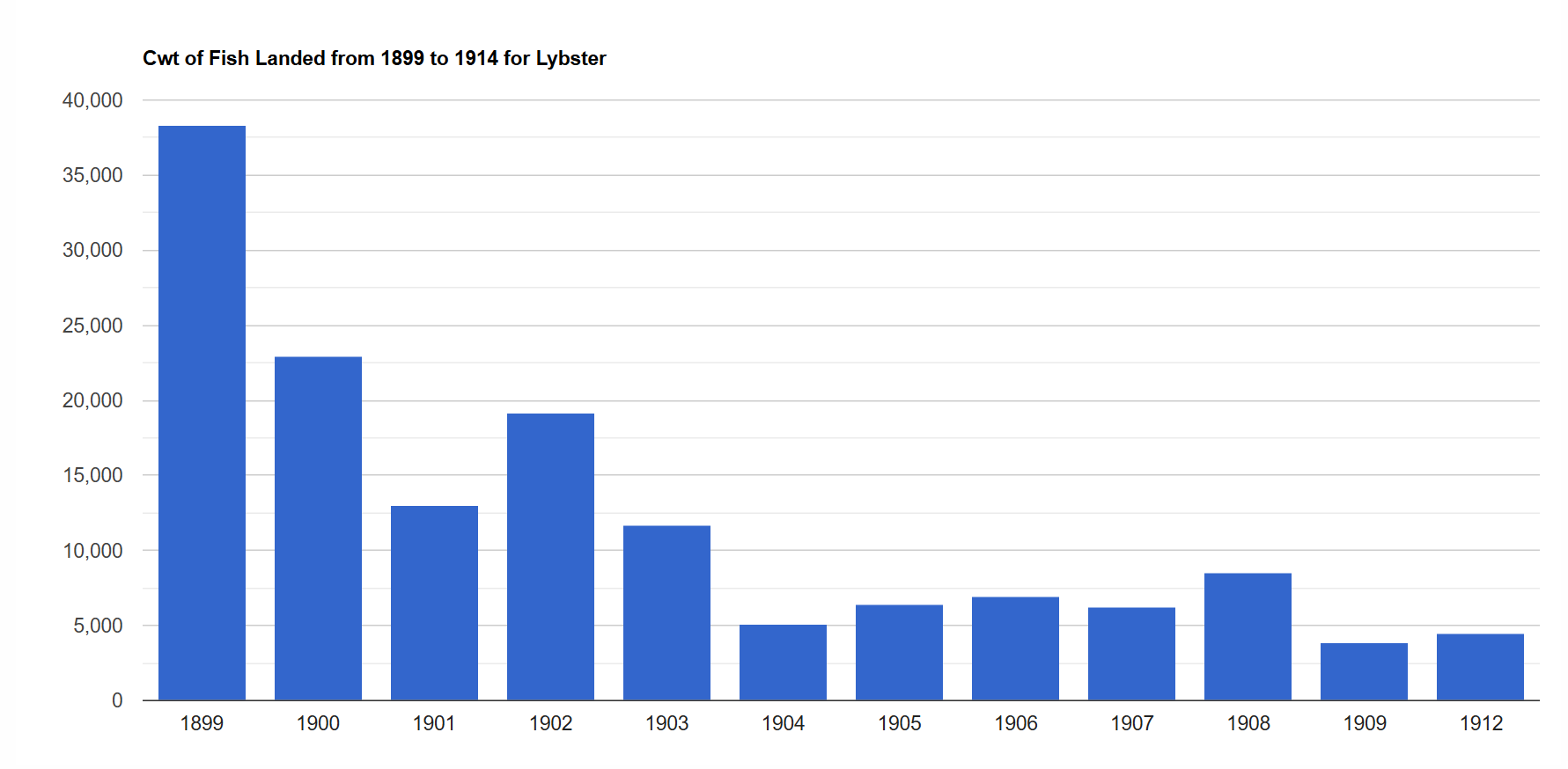
Cwt of fish landed (1 cwt is about 50 kg.)

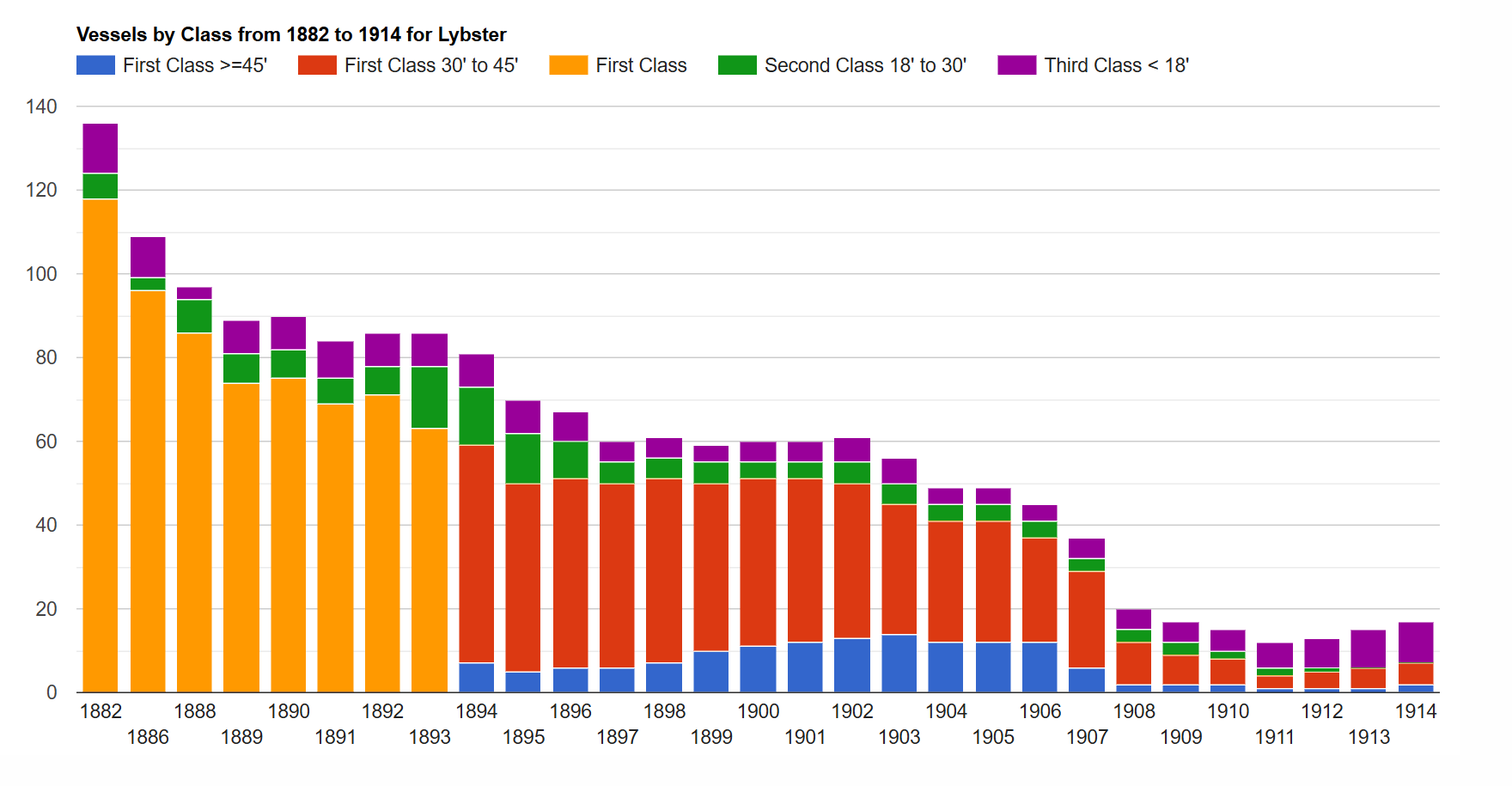
Vessels by class

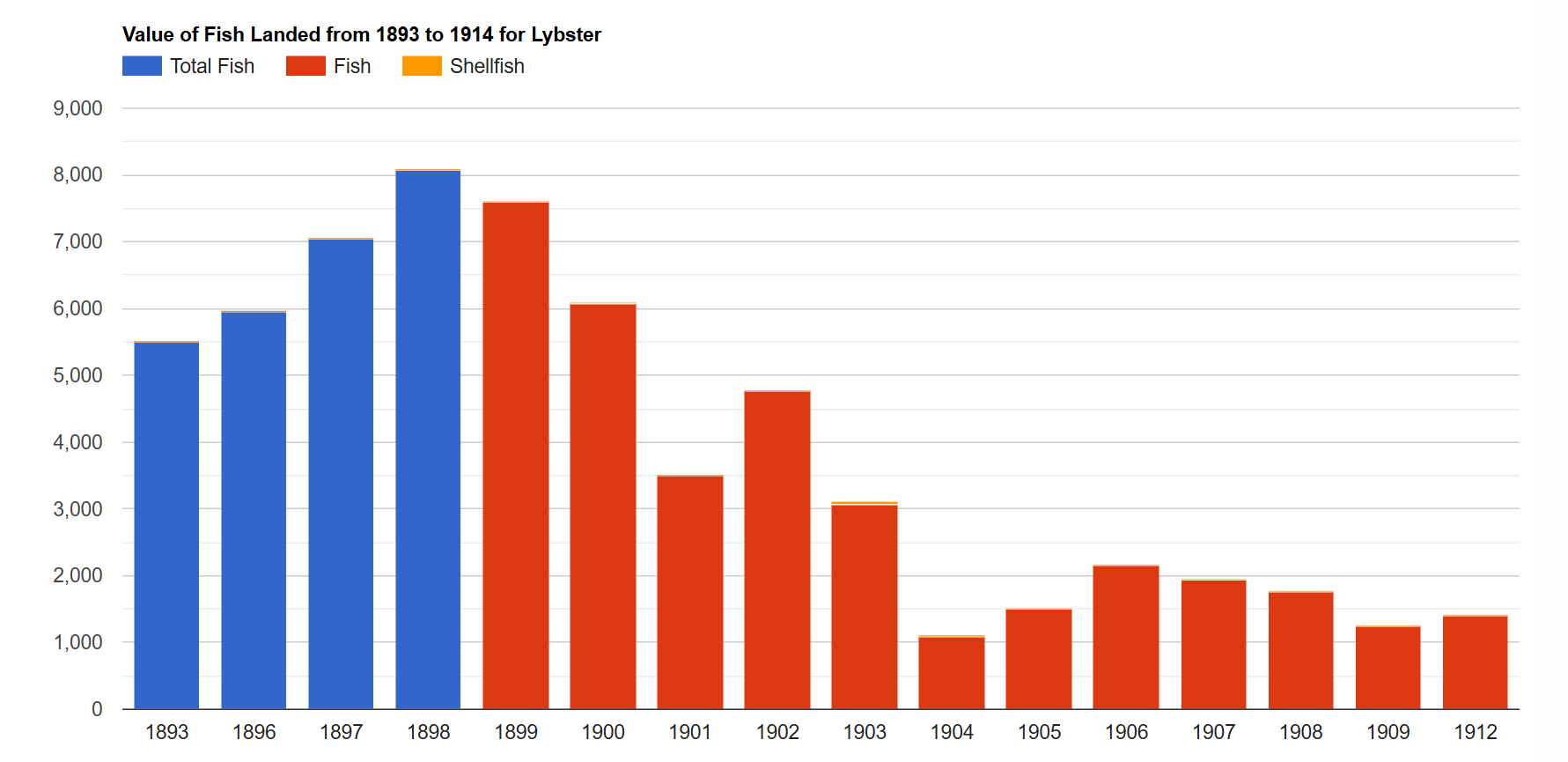
Value (£] of fish landed

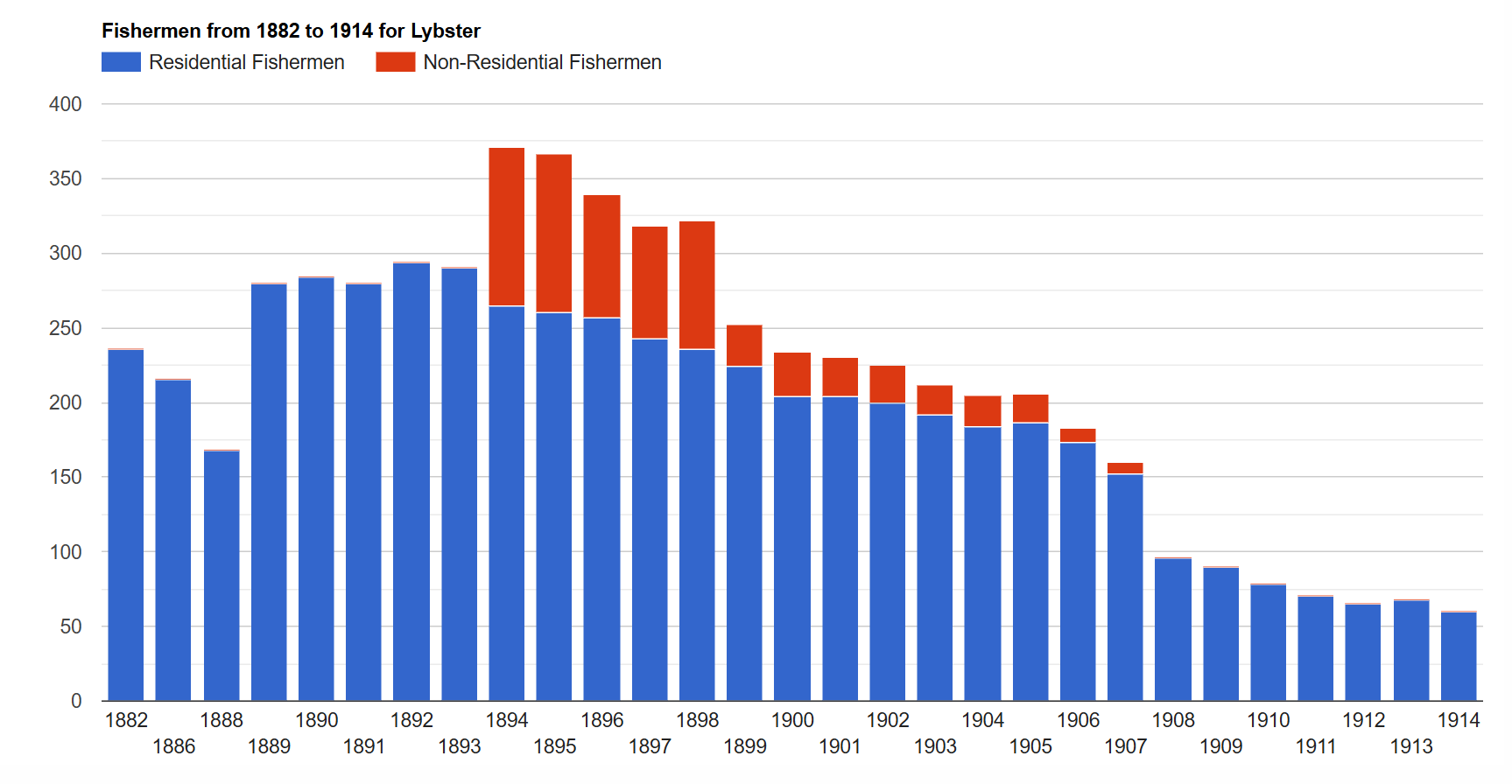
Number of fishermen

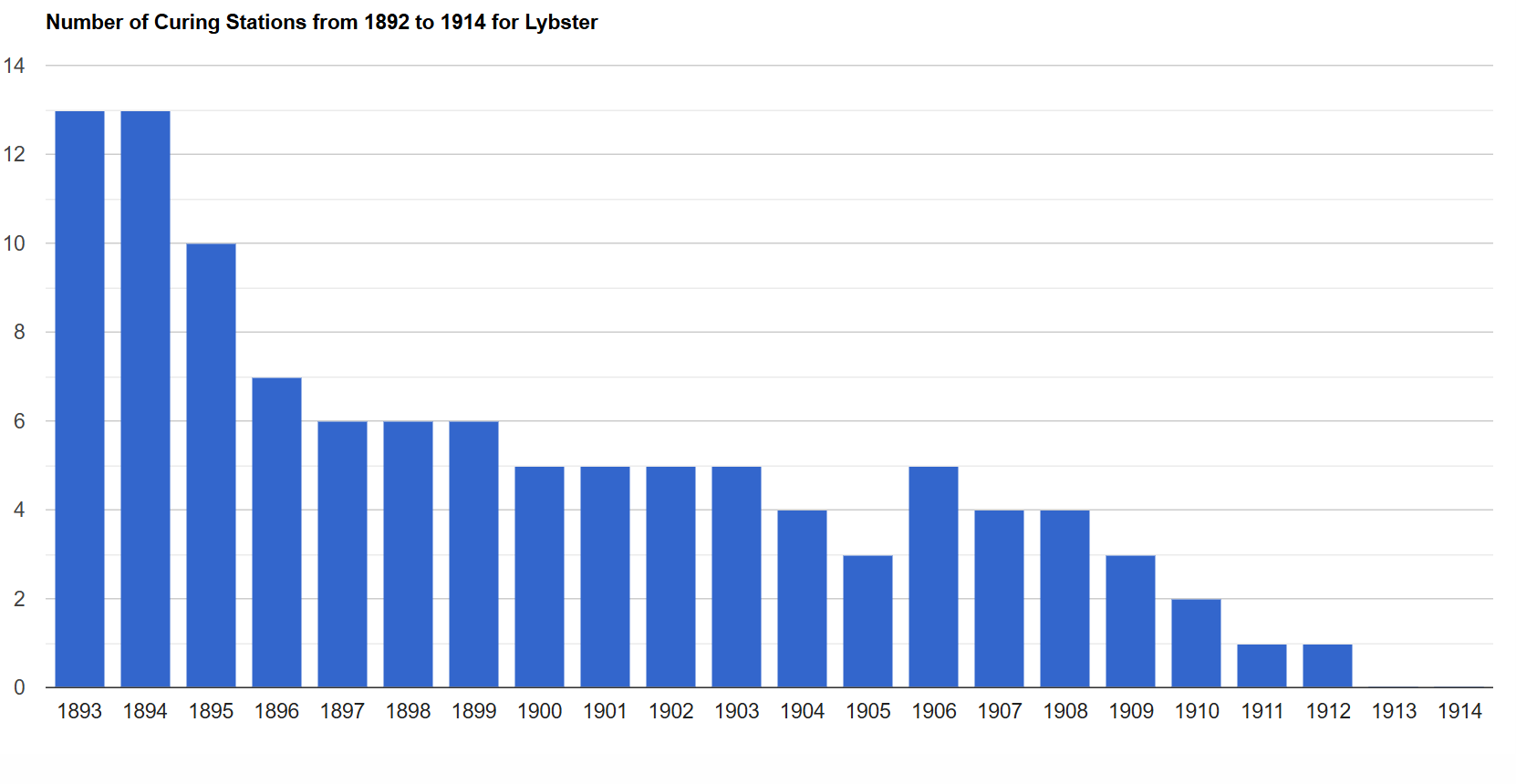
Number of curing stations

== Patrick Sinclair ==
Lybster's sister city is Mackinac Island, Michigan. One of the more famous of the clan was Patrick Sinclair, the founder of the island's Fort Mackinac in the USA.

== Gallery ==
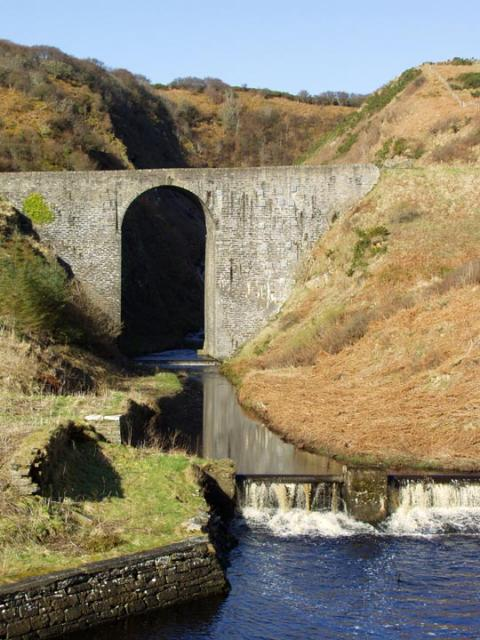
Old bridge at Lybster Harbour

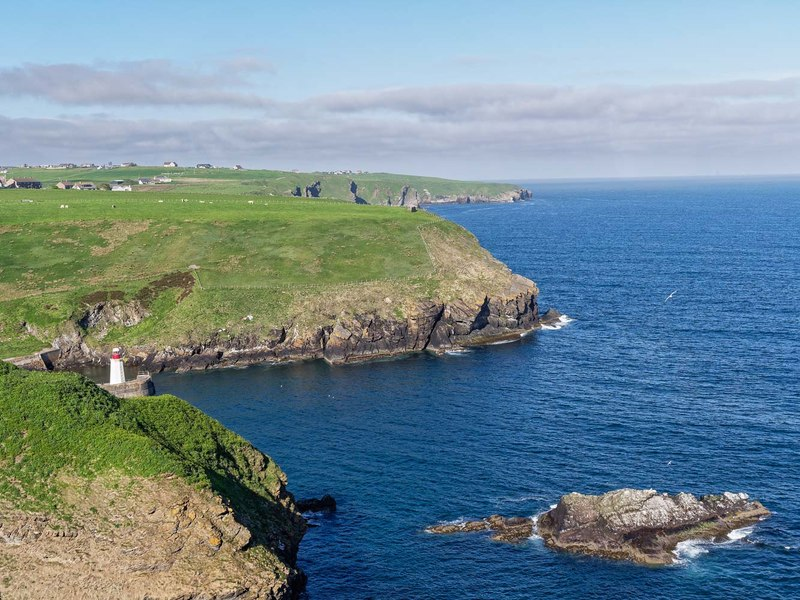
Entrance to Lybster Harbour

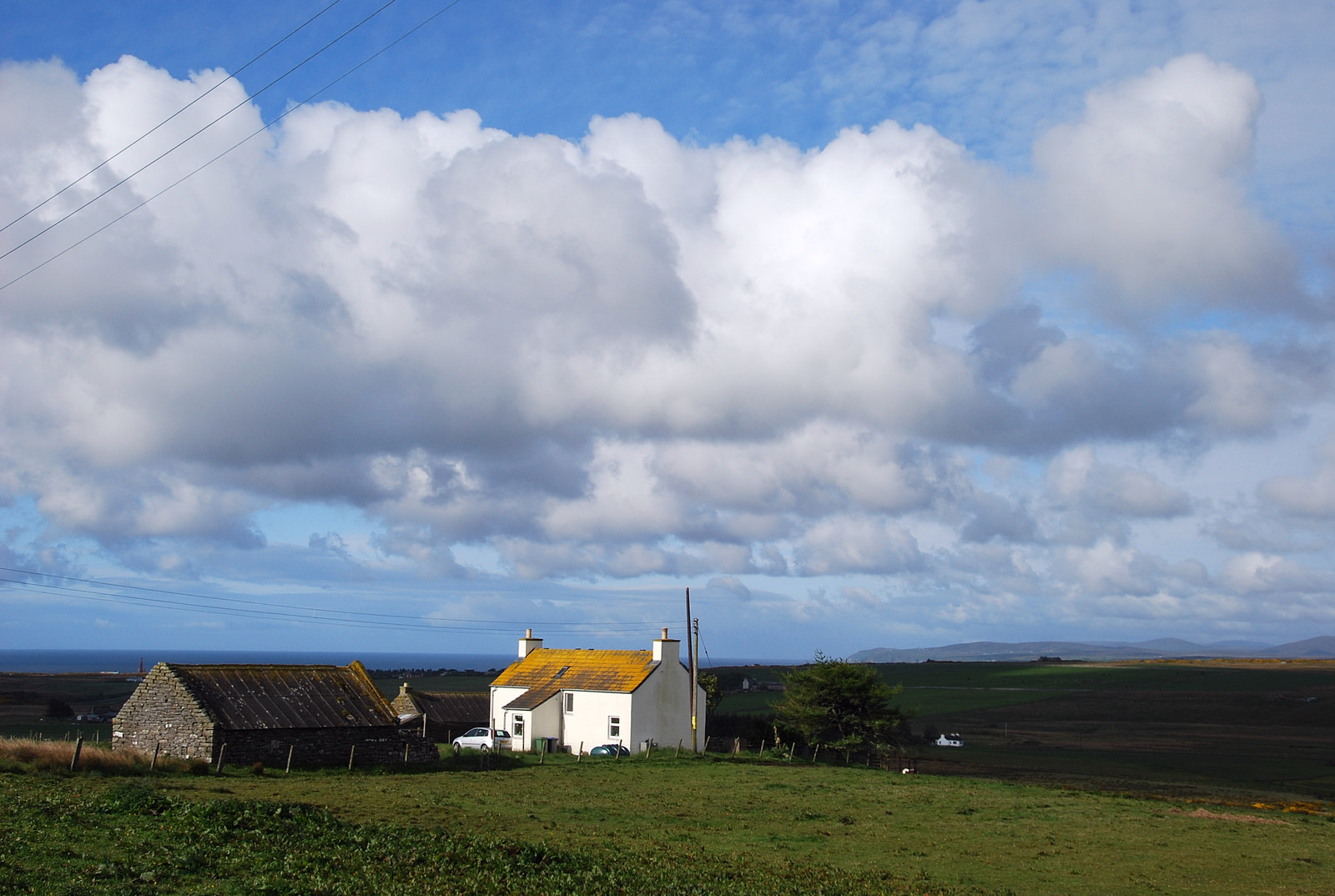
Upper Lybster West

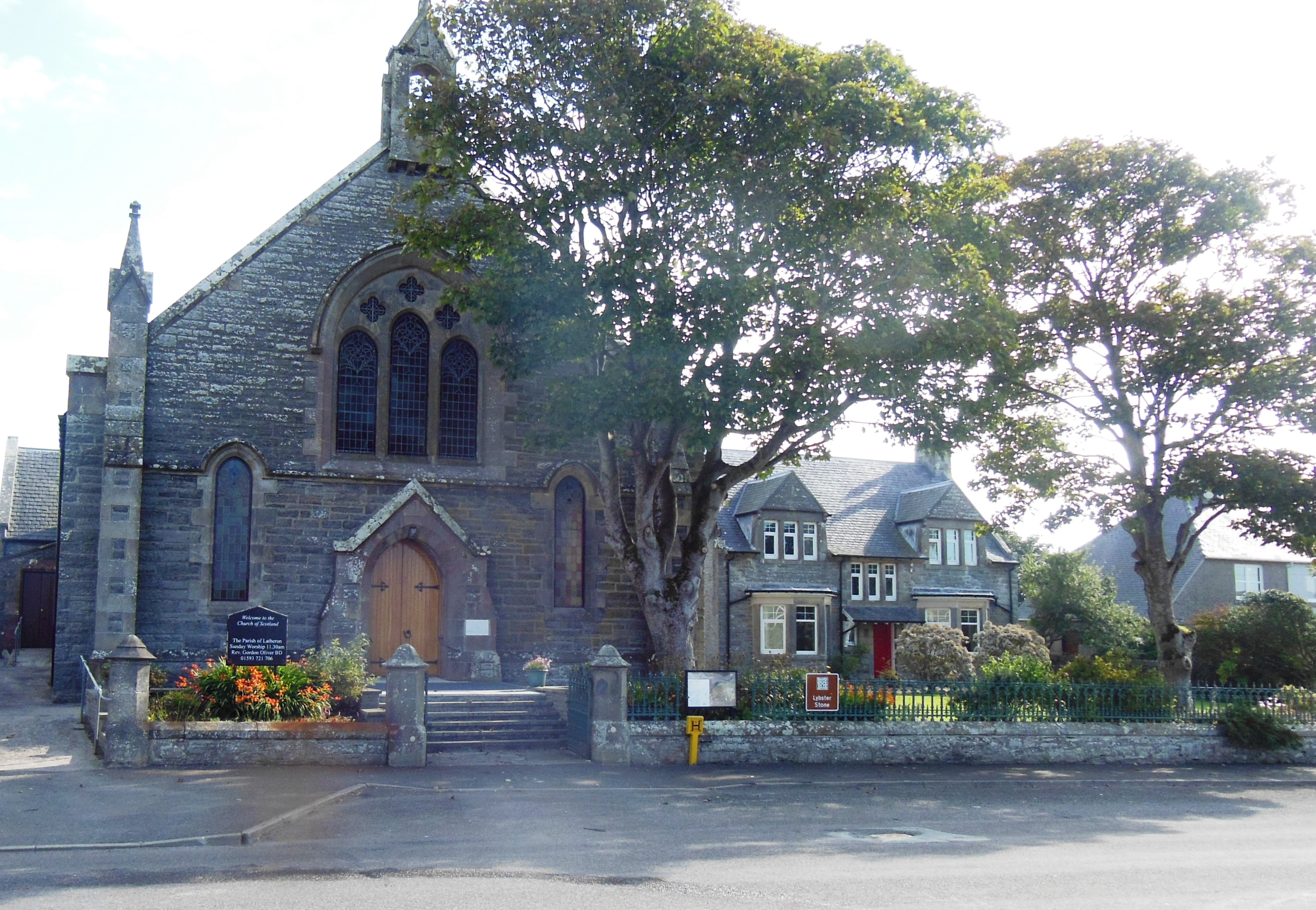
The Church of Scotland, Parish of Latheron, Lybster
