= UK railway stations – A =

Station name	Postcode links to map of station at Bing Maps	Station code links to arrivals and departures	Station code links to station information
Abbey Wood	SE2 9QG	ABW	ABW
Aber	CF83 1BR	ABE	ABE
Abercynon	CF45 4EW	ACY	ACY
Aberdare	CF44 7EA	ABA	ABA
Aberdeen	AB11 6RT	ABD	ABD
Aberdour	KY3 0TQ	AUR	AUR
Aberdovey	LL35 0RT	AVY	AVY
Abererch	LL53 6PJ	ABH	ABH
Abergavenny	NP7 5HY	AGV	AGV
Abergele & Pensarn	LL22 7SD	AGL	AGL
Aberystwyth	SY23 1LH	AYW	AYW
Accrington	BB5 0AA	ACR	ACR
Achanalt	IV23 2QD	AAT	AAT
Achnasheen	IV22 2EE	ACN	ACN
Achnashellach	IV54 8YU	ACH	ACH
Acklington	NE65 9BT	ACK	ACK
Acle	NR13 3BZ	ACL	ACL
Acocks Green	B27 6EB	ACG	ACG
Acton Bridge	CW8 2RE	ACB	ACB
Acton Central	W3 6BH	ACC	ACC
Acton Main Line	W3 9EH	AML	AML
Adderley Park	B8 1BY	ADD	ADD
Addiewell	EH55 8NQ	ADW	ADW
Addlestone	KT15 2PB	ASN	ASN
Adelaide	BT2 7HN		
Adisham	CT3 3JE	ADM	ADM
Adlington (Cheshire)	SK10 4NE	ADC	ADC
Adlington (Lancashire)	PR7 4HB	ADL	ADL
Adwick	DN6 7AQ	AWK	AWK
Aigburth	L17 6AQ	AIG	AIG
Ainsdale	PR8 3JP	ANS	ANS
Aintree	L9 5BE	AIN	AIN
Airbles	ML1 2SX	AIR	AIR
Airdrie	ML6 0AN	ADR	ADR
Albany Park	DA5 3HJ	AYP	AYP
Albrighton	WV7 3EA	ALB	ALB
Alderley Edge	SK9 7QZ	ALD	ALD
Aldermaston	RG7 4JJ	AMT	AMT
Aldershot	GU11 1HN	AHT	AHT
Aldrington	BN3 5EZ	AGT	AGT
Alexandra Palace	N22 7SS	AAP	AAP
Alexandra Parade	G31 3JN	AXP	AXP
Alexandria	G82 4ND	ALX	ALX
Alfreton	DE55 7JR	ALF	ALF
Alloa	FK10 1BA	ALO	ALO
Allens West	TS16 0PF	ALW	ALW
Alness	IV17 0SE	ASS	ASS
Alnmouth	NE66 3QF	ALM	ALM
Alresford	CO7 8AN	ALR	ALR
Alsager	ST7 2PN	ASG	ASG
Althorne	CM3 6DG	ALN	ALN
Althorpe	DN17 3HL	ALP	ALP
Altnabreac	KW12 6UR	ABC	ABC
Alton	GU34 2PY	AON	AON
Altrincham	WA14 1EN	ALT	ALT
Alvechurch	B48 7SE	ALV	ALV
Ambergate	DE56 2EN	AMB	AMB
Amberley	BN18 9LR	AMY	AMY
Amersham	HP6 5DW	AMR	AMR
Ammanford	SA18 2DD	AMF	AMF
Ancaster	NG32 3QU	ANC	ANC
Anderston	G3 8RR	AND	AND
Andover	SP10 3HW	ADV	ADV
Anerley	SE20 8PY	ANZ	ANZ
Angmering	BN16 3RE	ANG	ANG
Annan	DG12 6AX	ANN	ANN
Anniesland	G13 1HX	ANL	ANL
Ansdell & Fairhaven	FY8 1AE	AFV	AFV
Antrim	BT41 4AB		
Apperley Bridge	BD10 0FD	APY	APY
Appleby	CA16 6TT	APP	APP
Appledore	TN26 2DG	APD	APD
Appleford	OX14 4NT	APF	APF
Appley Bridge	WN6 9AE	APB	APB
Apsley	HP3 9SX	APS	APS
Arbroath	DD11 3AE	ARB	ARB
Ardgay	IV24 3DR	ARD	ARD
Ardlui	G83 7EB	AUI	AUI
Ardrossan Harbour	KA22 8ED	ADS	ADS
Ardrossan South Beach	KA22 8AG	ASB	ASB
Ardrossan Town	KA22 8DD	ADN	ADN
Ardwick	M12 6JT	ADK	ADK
Argyle Street	G1 5HB	AGS	AGS
Arisaig	PH39 4NX	ARG	ARG
Arlesey	SG15 6XA	ARL	ARL
Armadale	EH48 3LP	ARM	ARM
Armathwaite	CA4 9PW	AWT	AWT
Arnside	LA5 0HG	ARN	ARN
Arram	HU17 7NS	ARR	ARR
Arrochar & Tarbet	G83 7DA	ART	ART
Arundel	BN18 9PH	ARU	ARU
Ascot	SL5 9DW	ACT	ACT
Ascott-under-Wychwood	OX7 6AJ	AUW	AUW
Ash	GU12 6AZ	ASH	ASH
Ash Vale	GU12 5NJ	AHV	AHV
Ashburys	M12 5BX	ABY	ABY
Ashchurch for Tewkesbury	GL20 8JU	ASC	ASC
Ashfield	G22 6EZ	ASF	ASF
Ashford	TW15 2QN	AFS	AFS
Ashford International	TN23 1EZ	AFK	AFK
Ashington	NE63 9XE	ASL	ASL
Ashley	WA14 3QD	ASY	ASY
Ashley Down	BS7 9NB	ASD	ASD
Ashtead	KT21 2DR	AHD	AHD
Ashton-under-Lyne	OL6 6JP	AHN	AHN
Ashurst	TN3 9TL	AHS	AHS
Ashurst New Forest	SO40 7AA	ANF	ANF
Ashwell & Morden	SG7 5RT	AWM	AWM
Askam	LA16 7AL	ASK	ASK
Aslockton	NG13 9BE	ALK	ALK
Aspatria	CA7 2AR	ASP	ASP
Aspley Guise	MK17 8HY	APG	APG
Aston	B6 7LS	AST	AST
Atherstone	CV9 1BH	ATH	ATH
Atherton	M46 9LF	ATN	ATN
Attadale	IV54 8YX	ATT	ATT
Attenborough	NG9 5JL	ATB	ATB
Attleborough	NR17 2AS	ATL	ATL
Auchinleck	KA18 2AZ	AUK	AUK
Audley End	CB11 4LB	AUD	AUD
Aughton Park	L39 5QE	AUG	AUG
Aviemore	PH22 1PY	AVM	AVM
Avoncliff	BA15 2HA	AVF	AVF
Avonmouth	BS11 9JB	AVN	AVN
Axminster	EX13 5PJ	AXM	AXM
Aylesbury	HP20 1RU	AYS	AYS
Aylesbury Vale Parkway	HP18 0PS	AVP	AVP
Aylesford	ME20 7JL	AYL	AYL
Aylesham	CT3 3BD	AYH	AYH
Ayr	KA7 3AU	AYR	AYR

== See also ==
- List of heritage railway stations in the United Kingdom
