= Strathcarron railway station =

Railway station in Highland, Scotland

Strathcarron Scottish Gaelic: Srath Carrann
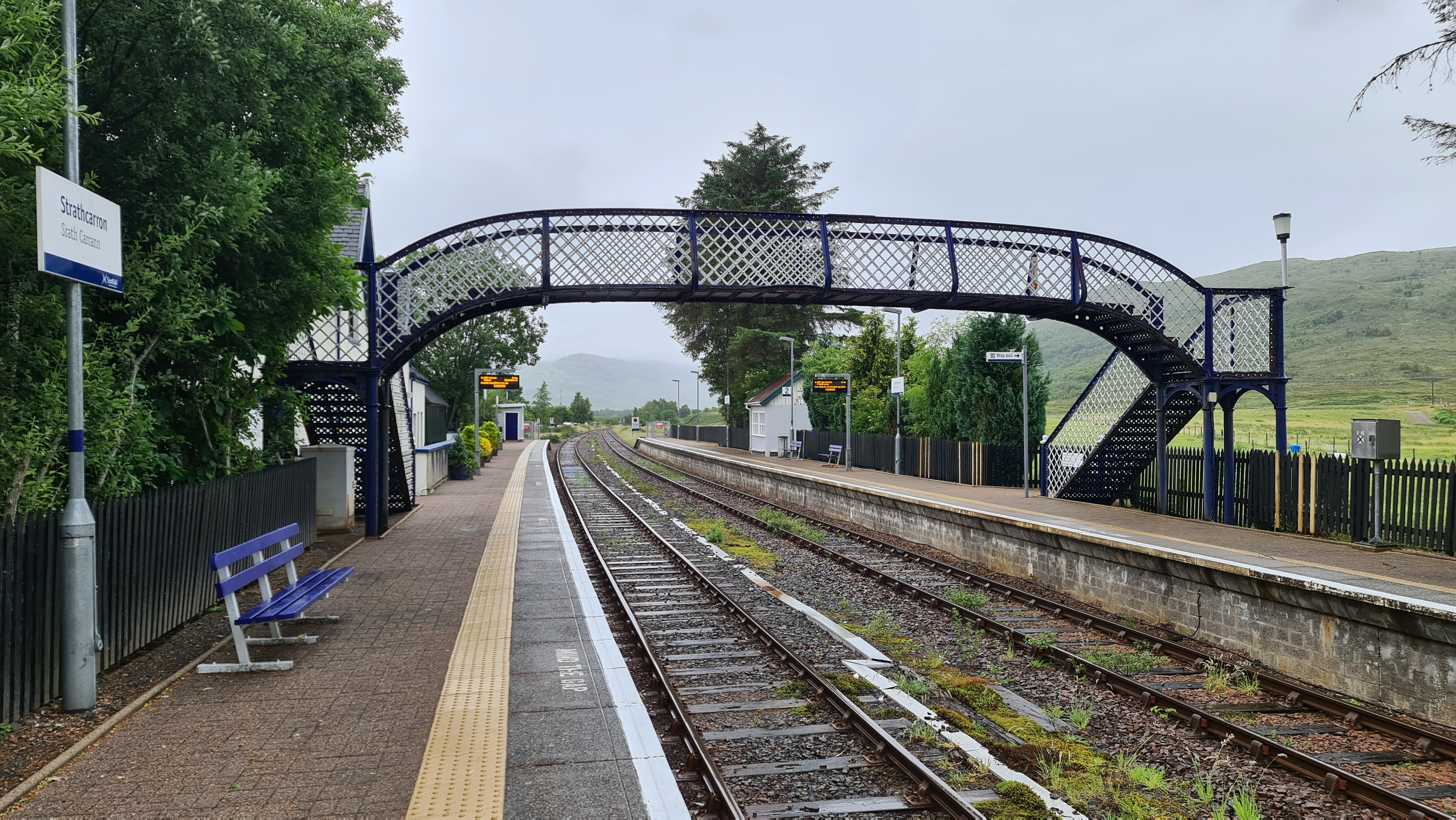

General information
- Location: Strathcarron, Highland; Scotland
- Coordinates: 57.4228°N 5.4286°W
- Grid reference: NG942421
- Manager: ScotRail
- Platforms: 2

Other information
- Station code: STC

History
- Original company: Dingwall and Skye Railway
- Pre-grouping: Highland Railway
- Post-grouping: LMSR

Key dates
- 19 August 1870: Opened

Passengers
- 2021/22: ▲5,370
- 2022/23: ▲5,524
- 2023/24: ▲6,972
- 2024/25: ▼6,620
- 2025/26: ▼6,556
Location
Notes
- Passenger statistics from the Office of Rail and Road

Strathcarron railway station is a remote railway station on the Kyle of Lochalsh Line, serving the small village of Strathcarron and the larger village of Lochcarron in the Highlands, northern Scotland. The station is 45 miles 74 chains (73.9 km) from Dingwall, between Achnashellach and Attadale. ScotRail, who manage the station, operate all services.

== History ==
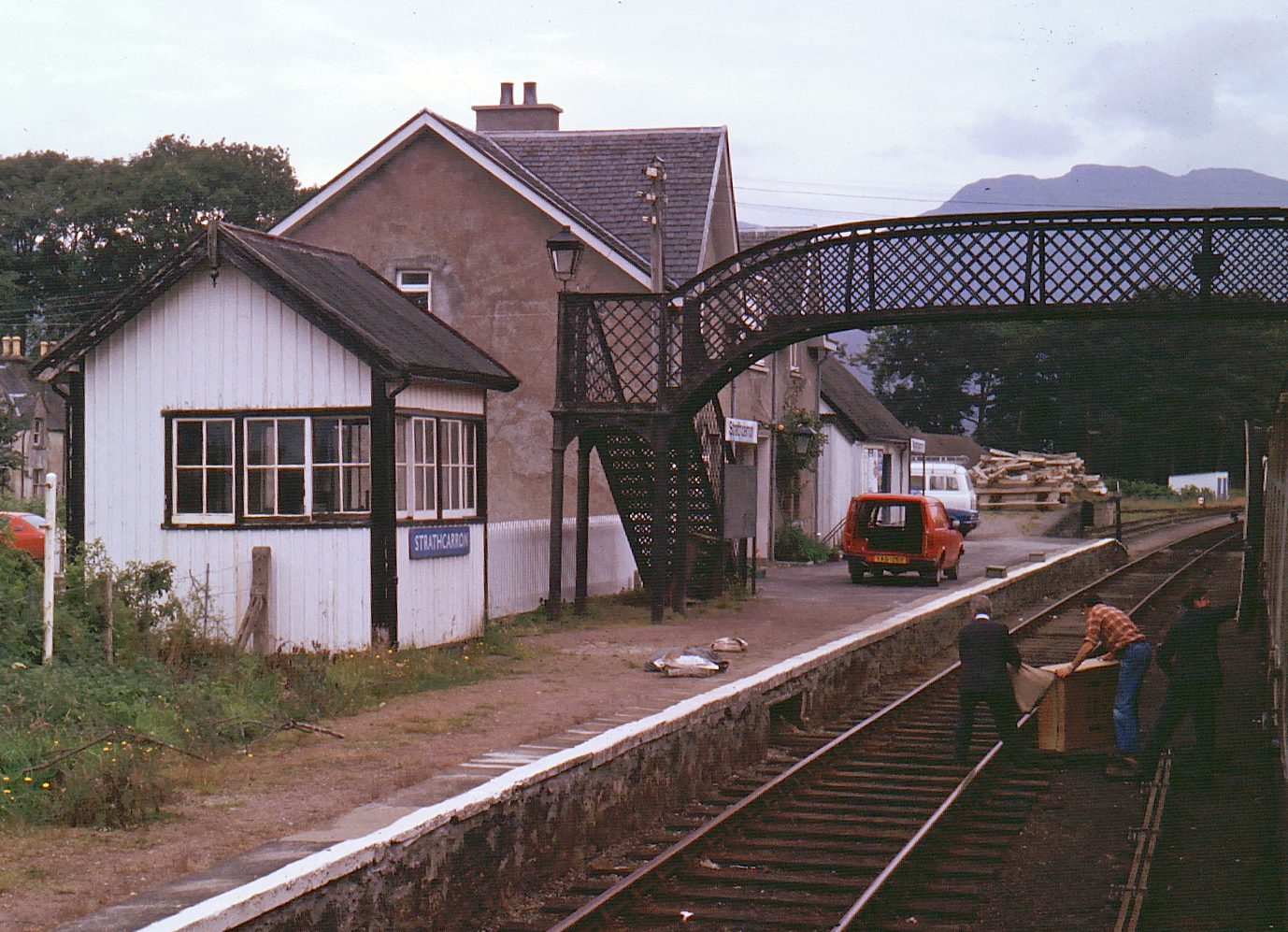
Strathcarron station, August 1980

The station was built by Murdoch Paterson between 1869 and 1870. The station was opened to passengers on 19 August 1870 by the Dingwall and Skye Railway.

In the early 1900s, cars were occasionally carried between Strathcarron and Kyle of Lochalsh to prevent accidents on the hazardous roads and a ferry journey.

== Facilities ==
Both platforms have waiting rooms and benches, and platform one - which is adjacent to the car park - also has a help point. Both platforms have step-free access, although the footbridge does not. As there are no facilities to purchase tickets, passengers must buy one in advance, or from the guard on the train.

== Platform layout ==
The station has a passing loop 19 chains (380 m) long, flanked by two platforms which can each accommodate a three-coach train. One of the Kyle line's three passing loops is located at the station (and trains are sometimes scheduled to cross here).

== Passenger volume ==
Passenger Volume at Strathcarron
	2004–05	2005–06	2006–07	2007–08	2008–09	2009–10	2010–11	2011–12	2012–13	2013–14	2014–15	2015–16	2016–17	2017–18	2018–19	2019–20	2020–21	2021–22	2022–23	2023–24	2024–25
Entries and exits	8,658	9,289	7,856	8,585	8,310	8,234	8,122	11,010	9,304	8,950	8,262	8,162	7,678	7,742	6,970	7,224	1,192	5,370	5,524	6,972	6,620

The statistics cover twelve month periods that start in April.

== Services ==
Four trains per day each way call at the station Mon-Sat, with two each way on summer Sundays and a single service each way on Sundays in winter.

Preceding station	National Rail	Following station
Achnashellach	ScotRail; Kyle of Lochalsh Line	Attadale
	Historical railways	
Achnashellach; Line and station open	Highland Railway; Dingwall and Skye Railway	Attadale; Line and station open

== Bibliography ==
- Brailsford, Martyn, ed. (December 2017) [1987]. Railway Track Diagrams 1: Scotland & Isle of Man (6th ed.). Frome: Trackmaps. ISBN 978-0-9549866-9-8.
- Butt, R. V. J. (October 1995). The Directory of Railway Stations: details every public and private passenger station, halt, platform and stopping place, past and present (1st ed.). Sparkford: Patrick Stephens Ltd. ISBN 978-1-85260-508-7. OCLC 60251199. OL 11956311M.
