= Attadale =

Attadale may refer to:

- Attadale railway station, serving Attadale, a locality in Scotland
- Attadale, Scotland, a locality in Scotland
- Attadale, Western Australia, a locality in Western Australia
