= Achnasheen railway station =

Railway station in Highland, Scotland

Achnasheen Scottish Gaelic: Achadh na Sìne
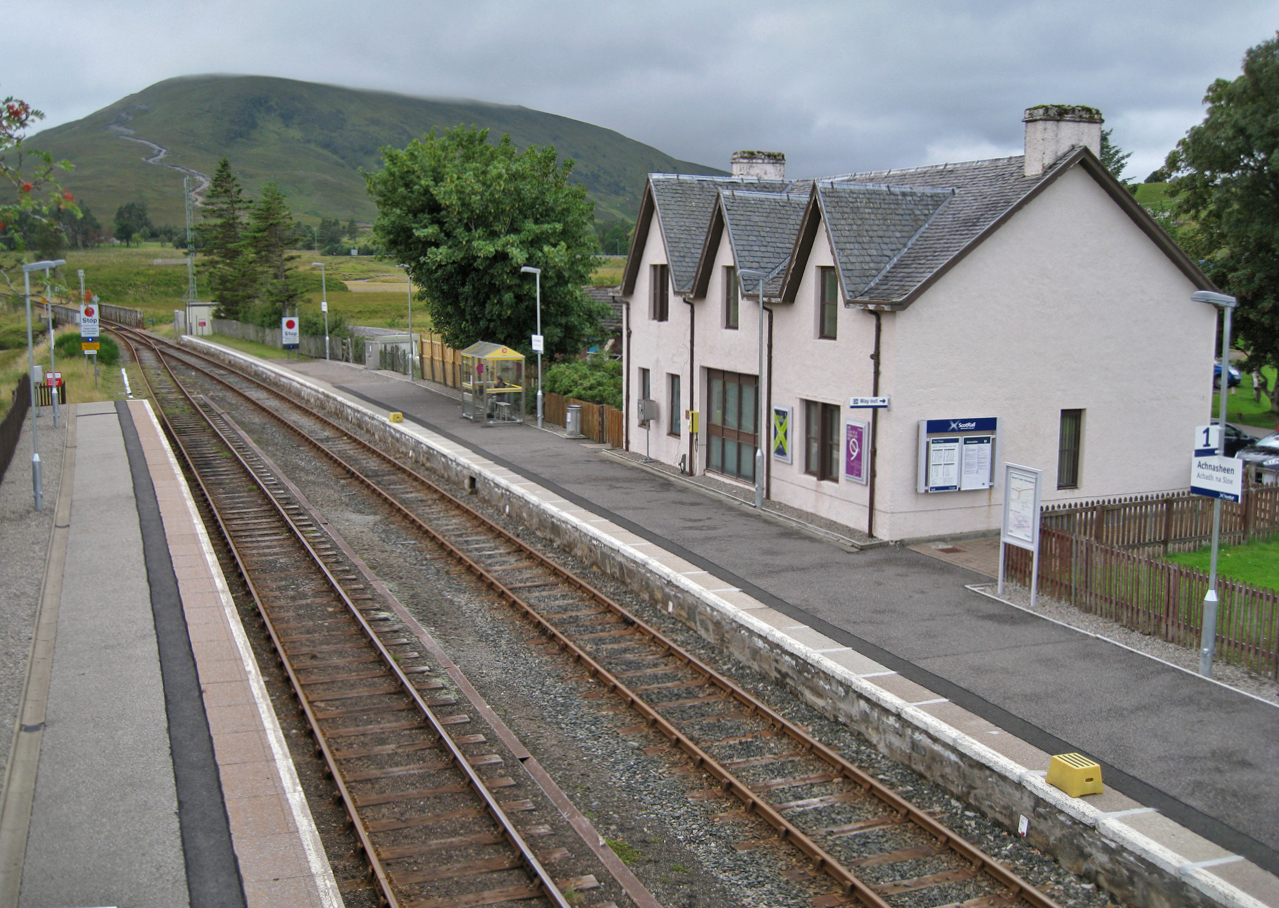

General information
- Location: Achnasheen, Highland; Scotland
- Coordinates: 57.5793°N 5.0723°W
- Grid reference: NH164585
- Manager: ScotRail
- Platforms: 2

Other information
- Station code: ACN
- Classification: DfT category F2

History
- Opened: 19 August 1870
- Original company: Dingwall and Skye Railway
- Pre-grouping: Highland Railway
- Post-grouping: LMSR

Passengers
- 2021/22: ▲2,420
- 2022/23: ▲3,302
- 2023/24: ▲3,980
- 2024/25: ▼3,340
- 2025/26: ▲4,006
Location
Notes
- Passenger statistics from the Office of Rail and Road

Achnasheen railway station is a remote railway station on the Kyle of Lochalsh Line, serving the village of Achnasheen in the north of Scotland. The station is 27 miles 72 chains (44.9 km) from Dingwall, between Achanalt and Achnashellach. ScotRail, who manage the station, operate all services.

== History ==
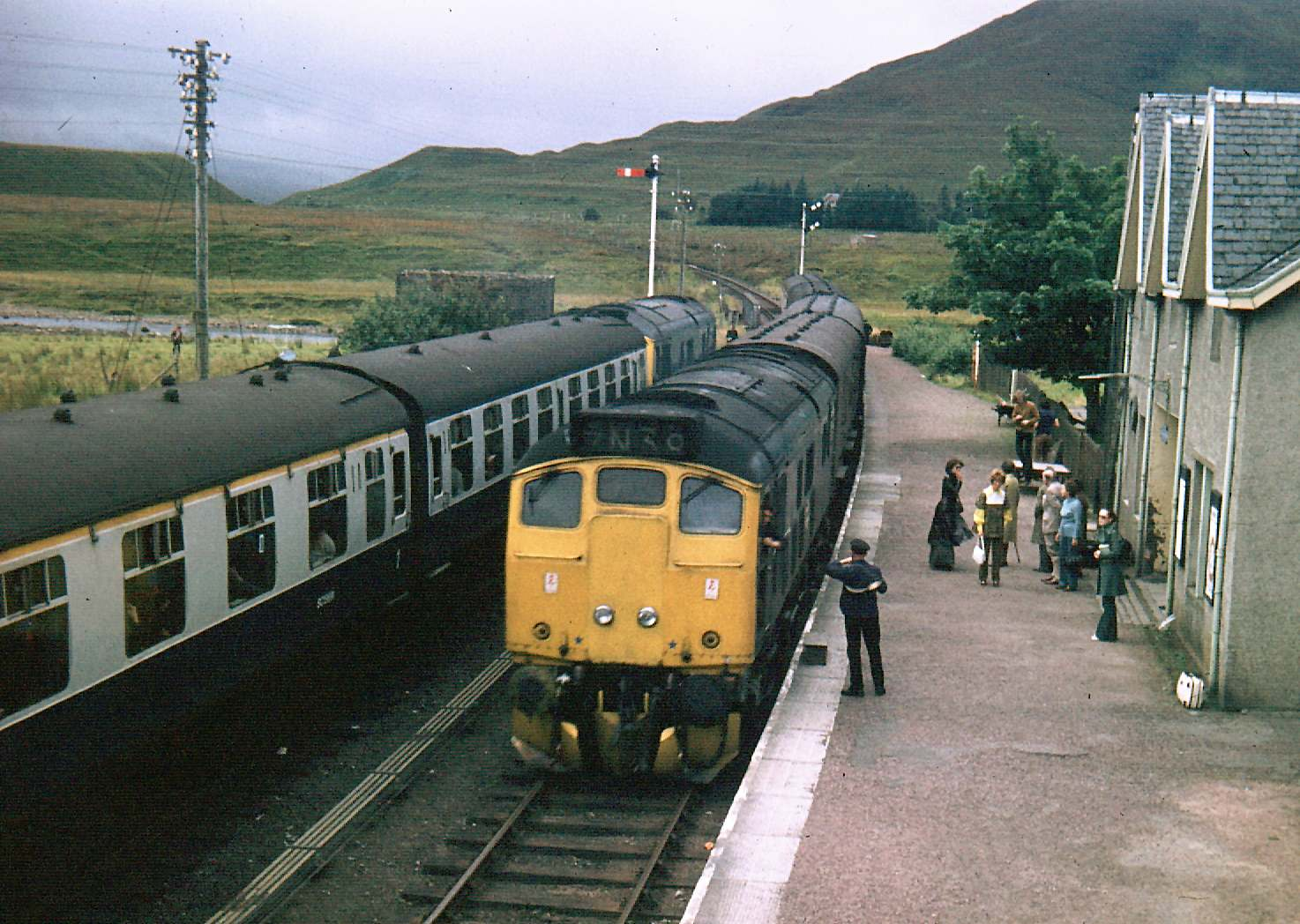
Loco-hauled trains pass at Achnasheen, September 1973

The station was opened by the Dingwall and Skye Railway on 19 August 1870, but operated from the outset by the Highland Railway. The station hotel was built by Alexander Ross and opened in 1871. It was extended by William Roberts in 1898.

The station formerly had a hotel, the dining room of which overlooked the station platforms. The hotel burned down in the 1980s.

== Facilities ==
Facilities here are very basic, consisting of shelters and benches on both platforms on both platforms, and a help point on platform 1, adjacent to a small car park. As there are no facilities to purchase tickets, passengers must buy one in advance, or from the guard on the train.

In 2025, the railway station building was put on the market.

== Passenger volume ==
The main origin or destination station for journeys to or from Achnasheen in the 2022–23 period was Inverness, making up 1,936 of the 3,302 journeys (58.6%).

Passenger Volume at Achnasheen
	2004–05	2005–06	2006–07	2007–08	2008–09	2009–10	2010–11	2011–12	2012–13	2013–14	2014–15	2015–16	2016–17	2017–18	2018–19	2019–20	2020–21	2021–22	2022–23	2023–24	2024–25
Entries and exits	2,379	2,471	2,697	2,974	3,202	3,614	3,698	3,998	3,566	3,972	3,722	3,700	3,076	3,310	3,284	3,234	620	2,420	3,302	3,980	3,340

The statistics cover twelve month periods that start in April.

== Services ==
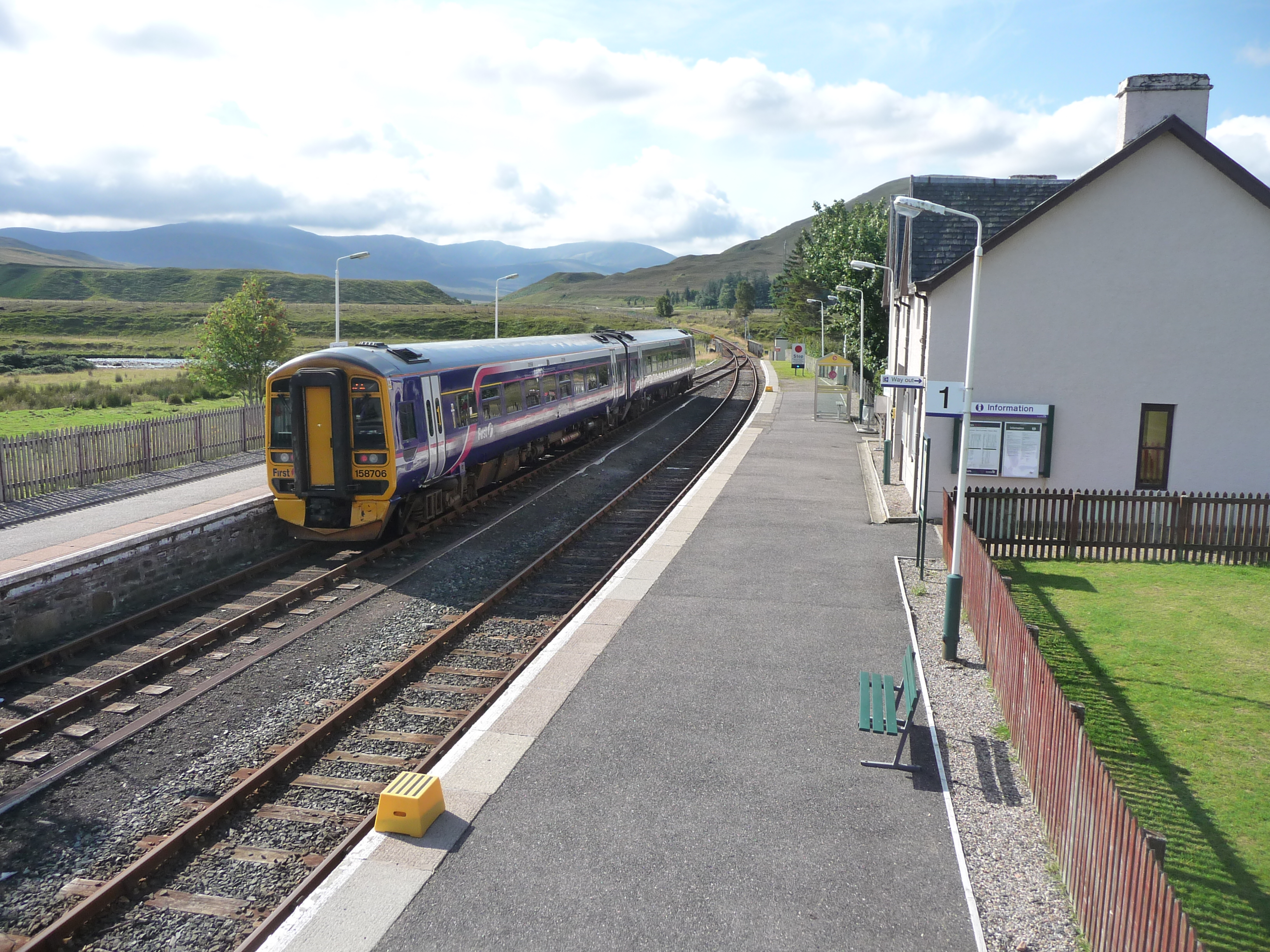
A First ScotRail train departing Achnasheen station with a service bound for Kyle of Lochalsh

There are four trains a day in each direction (one on Sundays in winter, two in summer) stopping here, connecting Achnasheen with all stations between Inverness and Kyle of Lochalsh.

Preceding station	National Rail	Following station
Achanalt	ScotRail; Kyle of Lochalsh Line	Achnashellach
	Historical railways	
Achanalt; Line and Station open	Highland Railway; Dingwall and Skye Railway	Glencarron Platform; Line open; Station closed

== Bibliography ==
- Brailsford, Martyn, ed. (December 2017) [1987]. Railway Track Diagrams 1: Scotland & Isle of Man (6th ed.). Frome: Trackmaps. ISBN 978-0-9549866-9-8.
- Butt, R. V. J. (October 1995). The Directory of Railway Stations: details every public and private passenger station, halt, platform and stopping place, past and present (1st ed.). Sparkford: Patrick Stephens Ltd. ISBN 978-1-85260-508-7. OCLC 60251199. OL 11956311M.
- Caton, Peter (2018). Remote Stations. Leicestershire: Matador. ISBN 978-1-78901-408-2.
