= Kyle of Lochalsh line =

Railway line in the Scottish Highlands

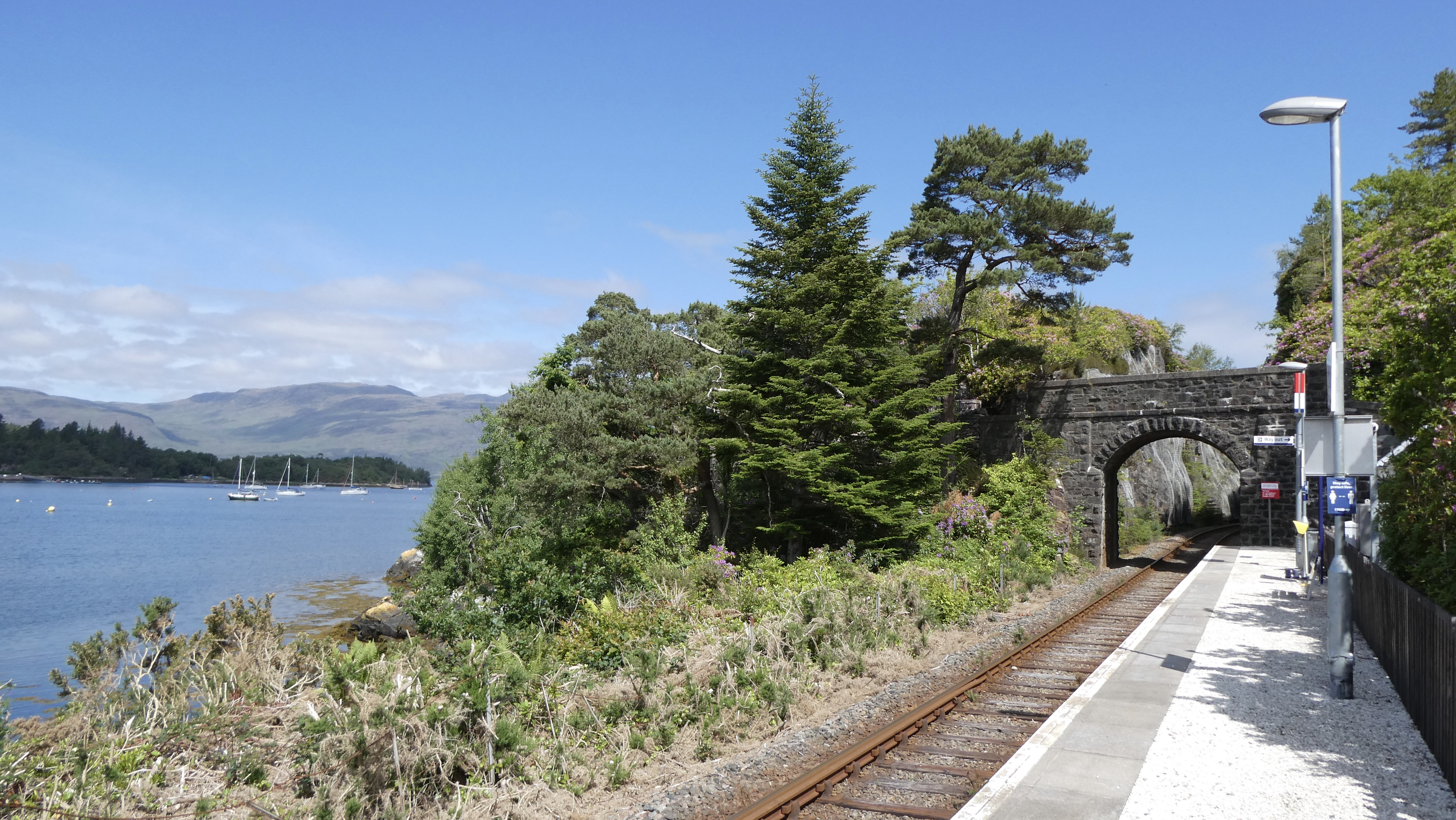
- The platform at Duncraig railway station alongside Loch Carron, looking northeast towards Inverness

Overview
- Status: Operational
- Owner: Network Rail
- Locale: Highland, Scotland
- Termini: Dingwall; Kyle of Lochalsh
- Stations: 13

Service
- System: National Rail
- Operator: ScotRail
- Rolling stock: Class 158

Technical
- Line length: 63 mi 64 ch (102.7 km)
- Num of tracks: Single-track with passing loops
- Character: Rural
- Track gauge: Standard gauge 1,435 mm (4 ft 8 1/2 in)
- Operating speed: 40 mph (65 km/h)
Route map
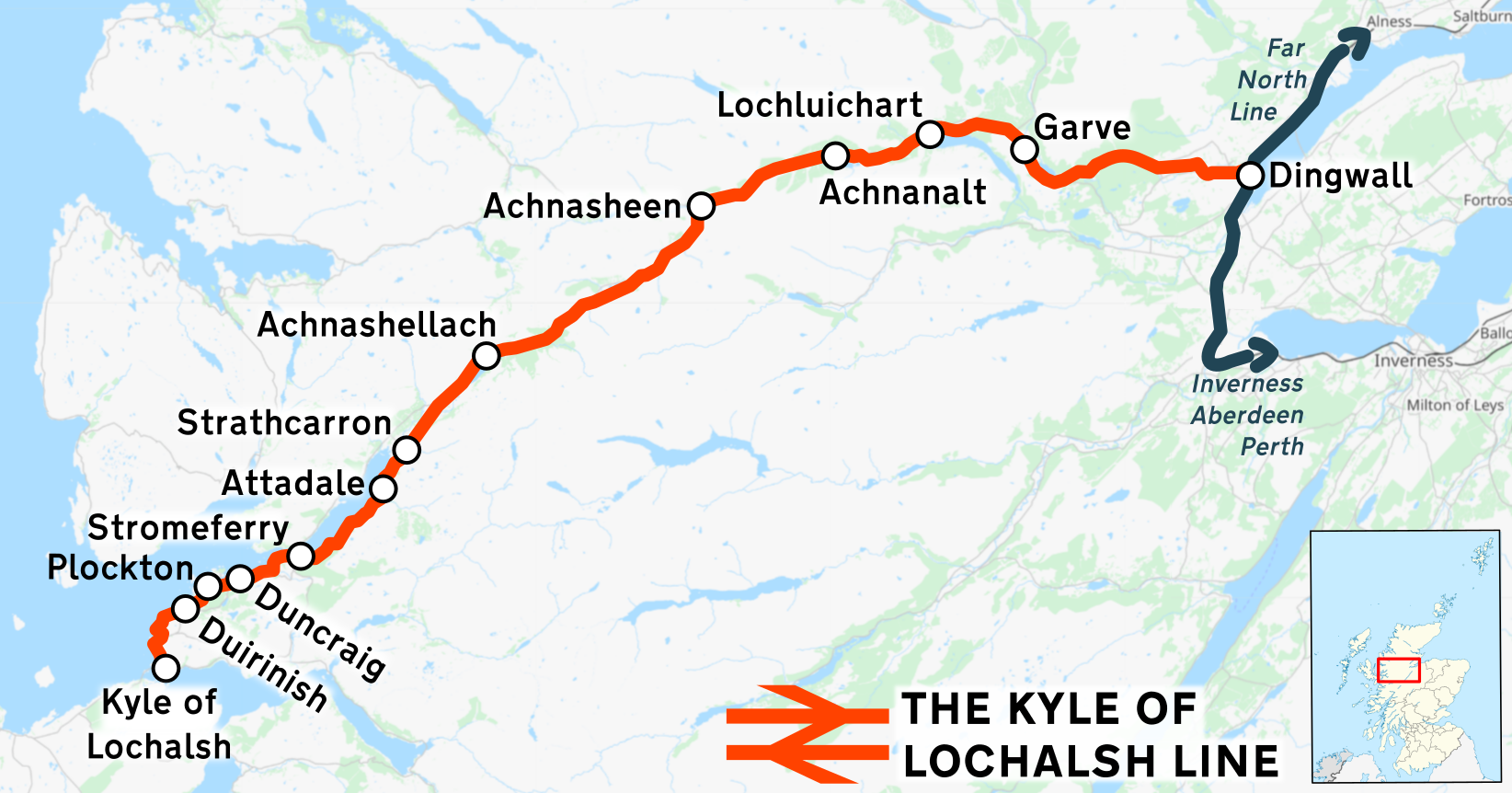
(Click to expand)

The Kyle of Lochalsh line is a primarily single-track railway line in the Scottish Highlands, from Dingwall to Kyle of Lochalsh. Many of the passengers are tourists, but there are also locals visiting Inverness for shopping, and commuters. All services are provided by ScotRail and run beyond Dingwall to Inverness. In the past there were some through services to and from Glasgow, Edinburgh or Aberdeen. None of the 63-mile (101 km) line is electrified, and all trains on the line are diesel-powered, as are all other trains in the Scottish Highlands.

== Route ==
The Kyle of Lochalsh line runs east-west and links the town of Dingwall, on the east coast of the Highlands at the tip of the Cromarty Firth, with the village of Kyle of Lochalsh on the west coast, close to the Isle of Skye. The line lies entirely within the former county of Ross and Cromarty, part of the modern day Highland council area.

=== Dingwall–Achnasheen: Easter Ross ===
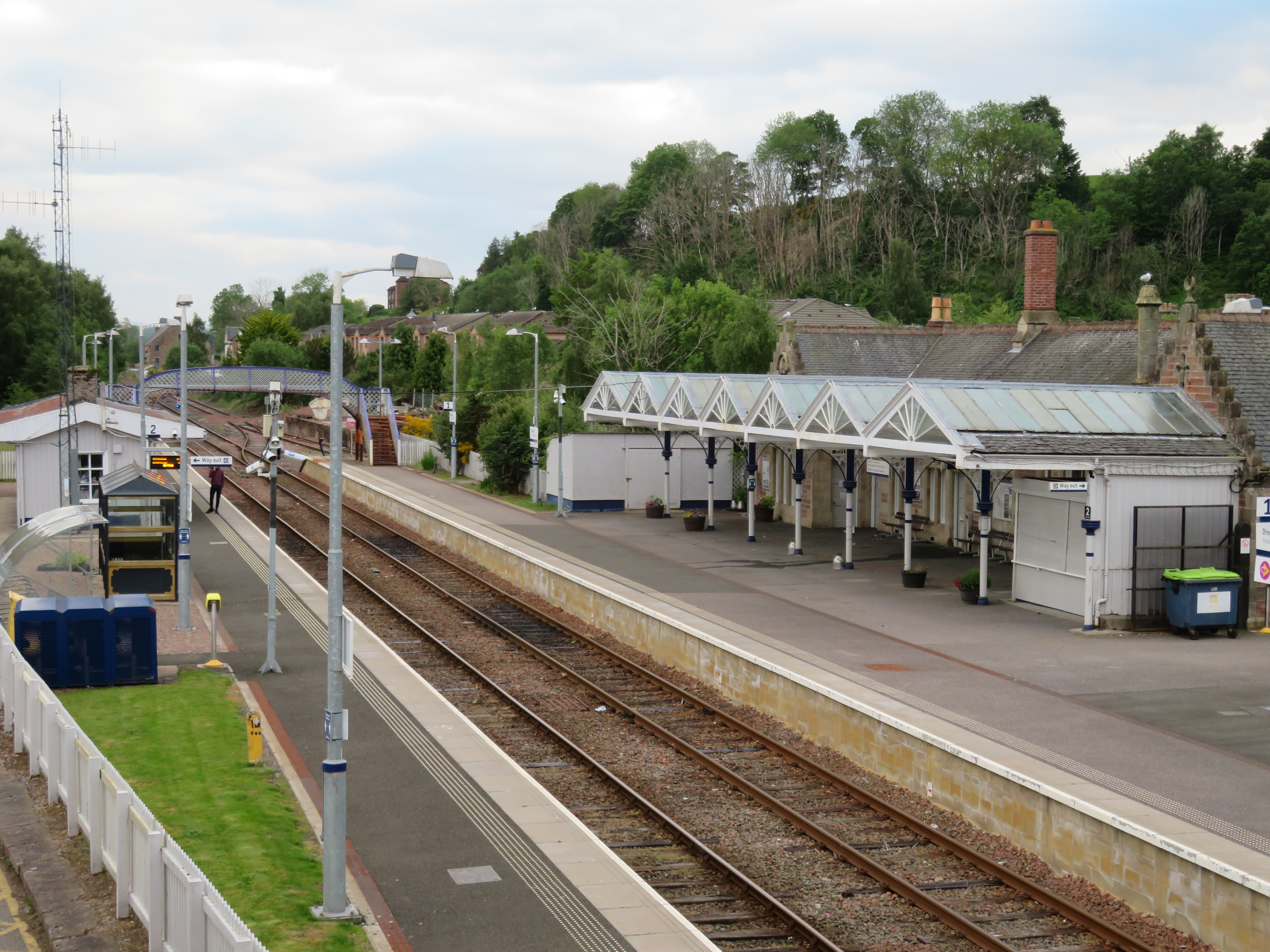
Dingwall railway station

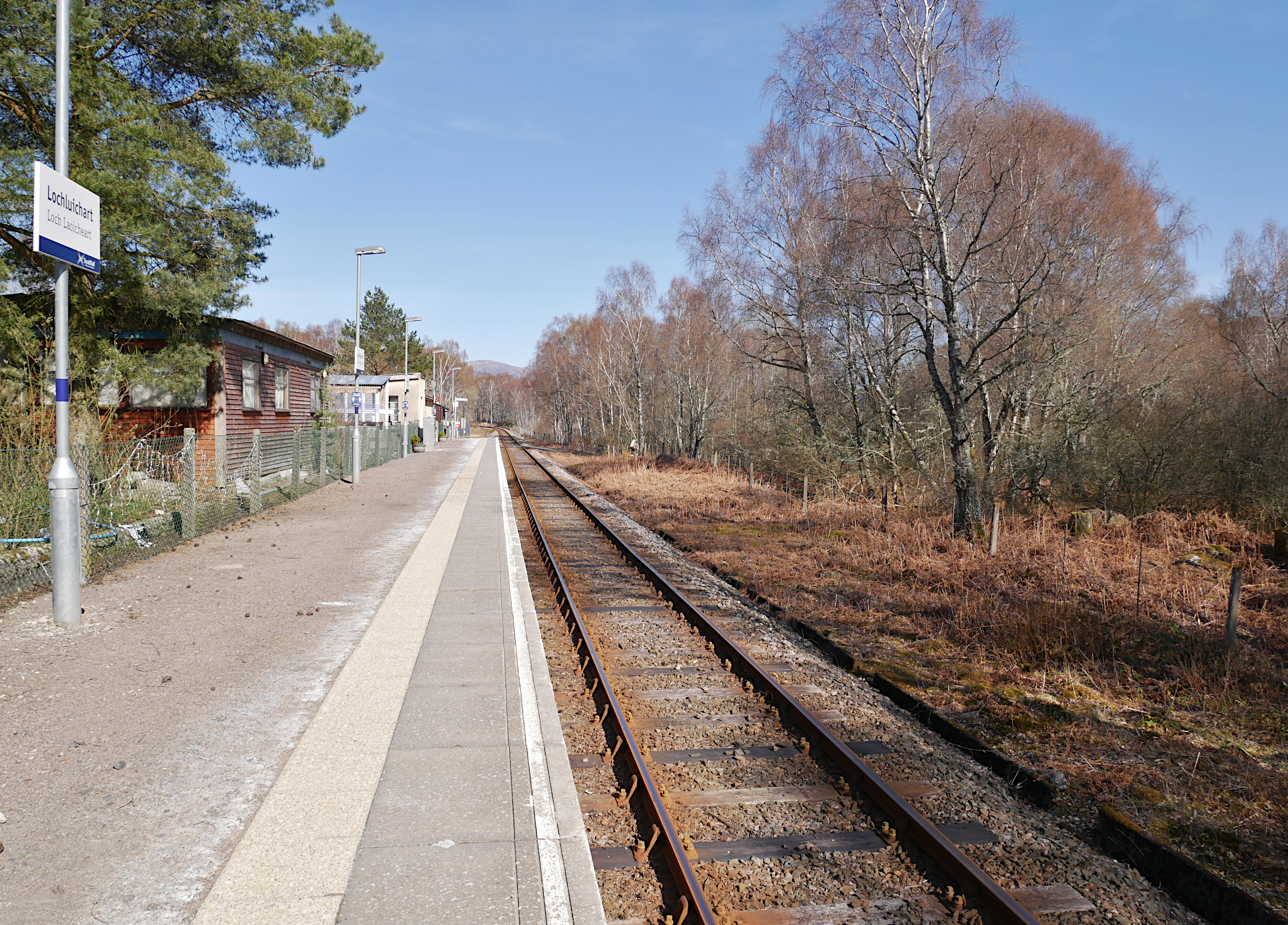
Lochluichart railway station

The route begins at Dingwall station (Note: Ordnance Survey grid reference: NH553586 Mileage from Dingwall: 0 mi 0 ch (0 km)) – a junction station with the Far North Line, which mostly runs along the Moray Firth and links Inverness with Wick and Thurso. Almost immediately north of Dingwall, the two lines diverge at Dingwall Junction (Note: Ordnance Survey grid reference: NH554590 Mileage from Dingwall: 0 mi 19 ch (0.38 km)) and the line to Kyle of Lochalsh takes a sharp left turn to head west.

Initially, the single-track line briefly follows the course of the A834 road until it abruptly curves off to the north, crossing over the River Peffery, only to turn west again. There used to be a short branch line here that went straight on towards Strathpeffer; this branch closed to passengers in 1946 and closed completely in 1951. The line to Kyle, meanwhile, bypasses the town about 1 mile (1.6 km) to the north; Achterneed station (Note: Ordnance Survey grid reference: NH490597) existed along this stretch and also served Strathpeffer until it too closed in 1964. Achterneed is one of only three stations on the main line to have been closed, and one of two that were never reopened.

The line then continues west, climbing at gradients as steep as 1 in 50, until it passes close to the summit of Raven Rock where it starts descending. It eventually meets the Black Water – a tributary of the River Conon – and follows it upstream alongside the A832 road. The railway and the road both skirt the southern edge of Loch Garve and then turn northwest, approaching the first open station on the line – Garve. (Note: Ordnance Survey grid reference: NH395613 Mileage from Dingwall: 11 mi 65 ch (19.0 km)) This was supposed to be site of a junction with the Garve and Ullapool Railway to the port village of Ullapool but, despite securing government approval, this line was never built.

Beyond Garve, the railway and the A832 continue westwards, away from the Black Water whose source lies to the north. Soon, the line meets Loch Luichart – the source of the River Conon – and follows its northern edge; Lochluichart station (Note: Ordnance Survey grid reference: NH322625 Mileage from Dingwall: 17 mi 20 ch (27.8 km)) is located at the northwestern tip of the loch. This station was moved to this location from its original site in 1954 as a result of a hydroelectric scheme, which raised the water level of the loch. From here, the line continues to follow several of the Conon's tributaries, passing by Loch a' Chuilinn and Loch Achanalt until it reaches Achanalt station (Note: Ordnance Survey grid reference: NH260615 Mileage from Dingwall: 21 mi 34 ch (34.5 km)) near the mouth of the River Bran. The track then follows the course of this river for about six miles (9.7 km) until the village of Achnasheen, near the eastern end of Loch a' Chroisg. The station at Achnasheen (Note: Ordnance Survey grid reference: NH164586 Mileage from Dingwall: 27 mi 72 ch (44.9 km)), like Garve, was to be the site of a junction: the proposed Loch Maree and Aultbea Railway was to run between Achnasheen and the small fishing village of Aultbea, but the line never received government approval.

Down the line from Achnasheen the line turns southwest, parting ways with the A832 which continues westwards; the railway now parallels the A890 road instead.

=== Achnasheen–Kyle of Lochalsh: Wester Ross ===
Achnashellach railway station

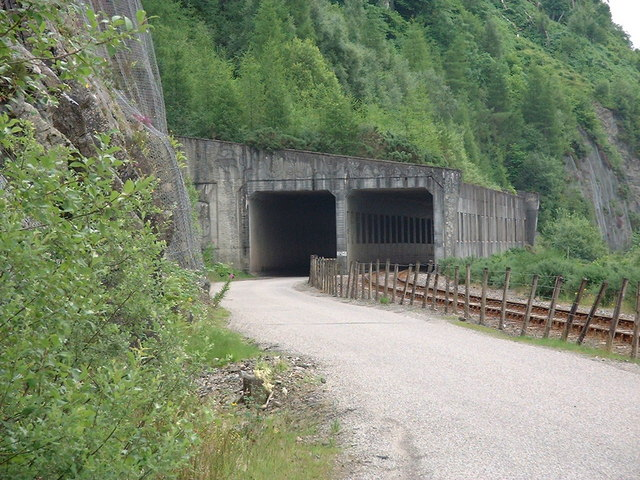
The avalanche shelter southwest of Attadale

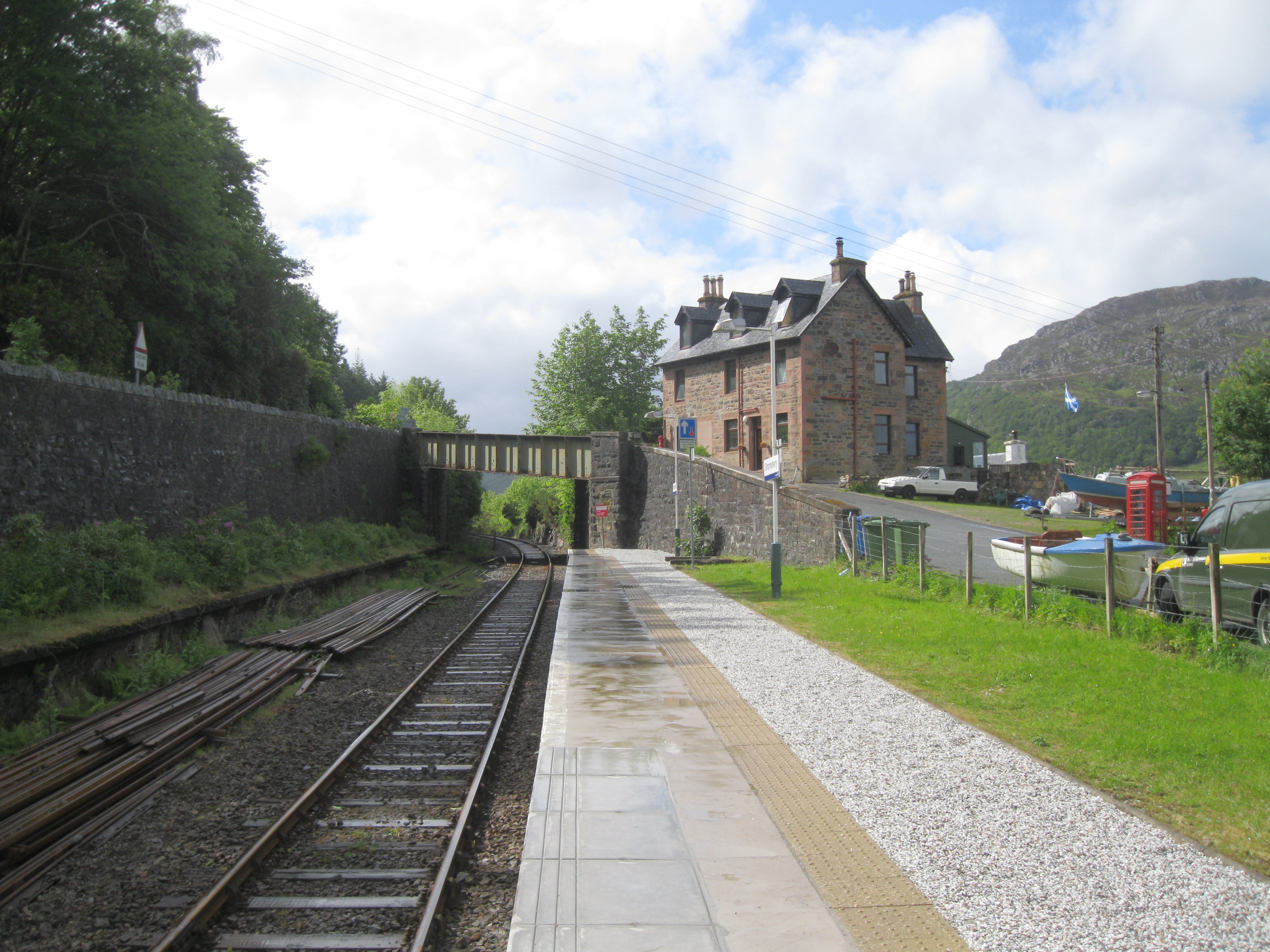
Stromeferry railway station

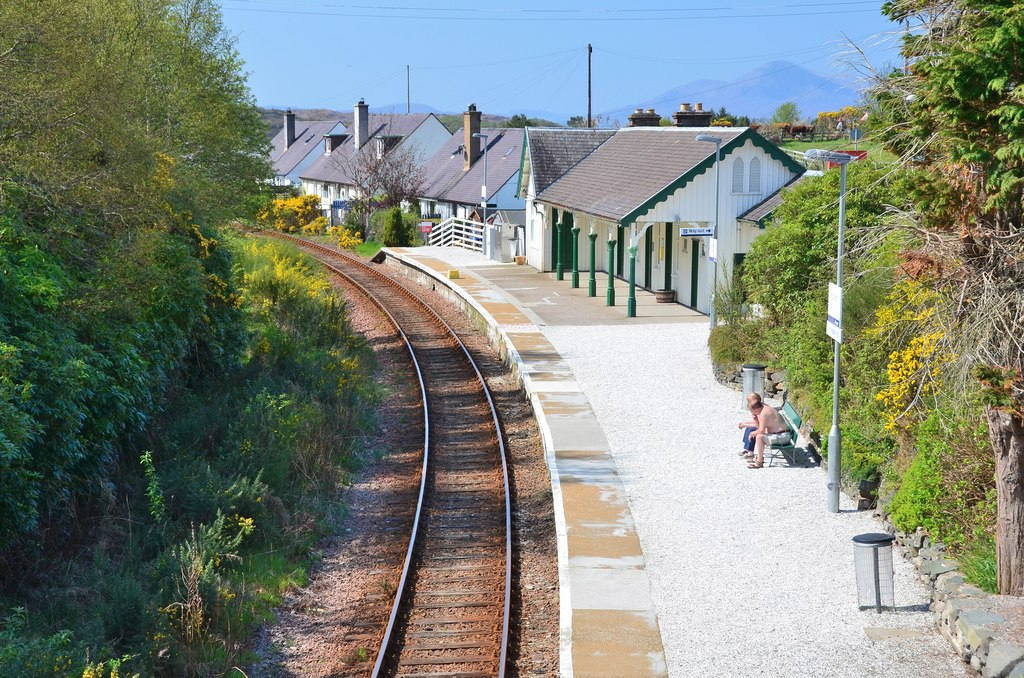
Plockton railway station

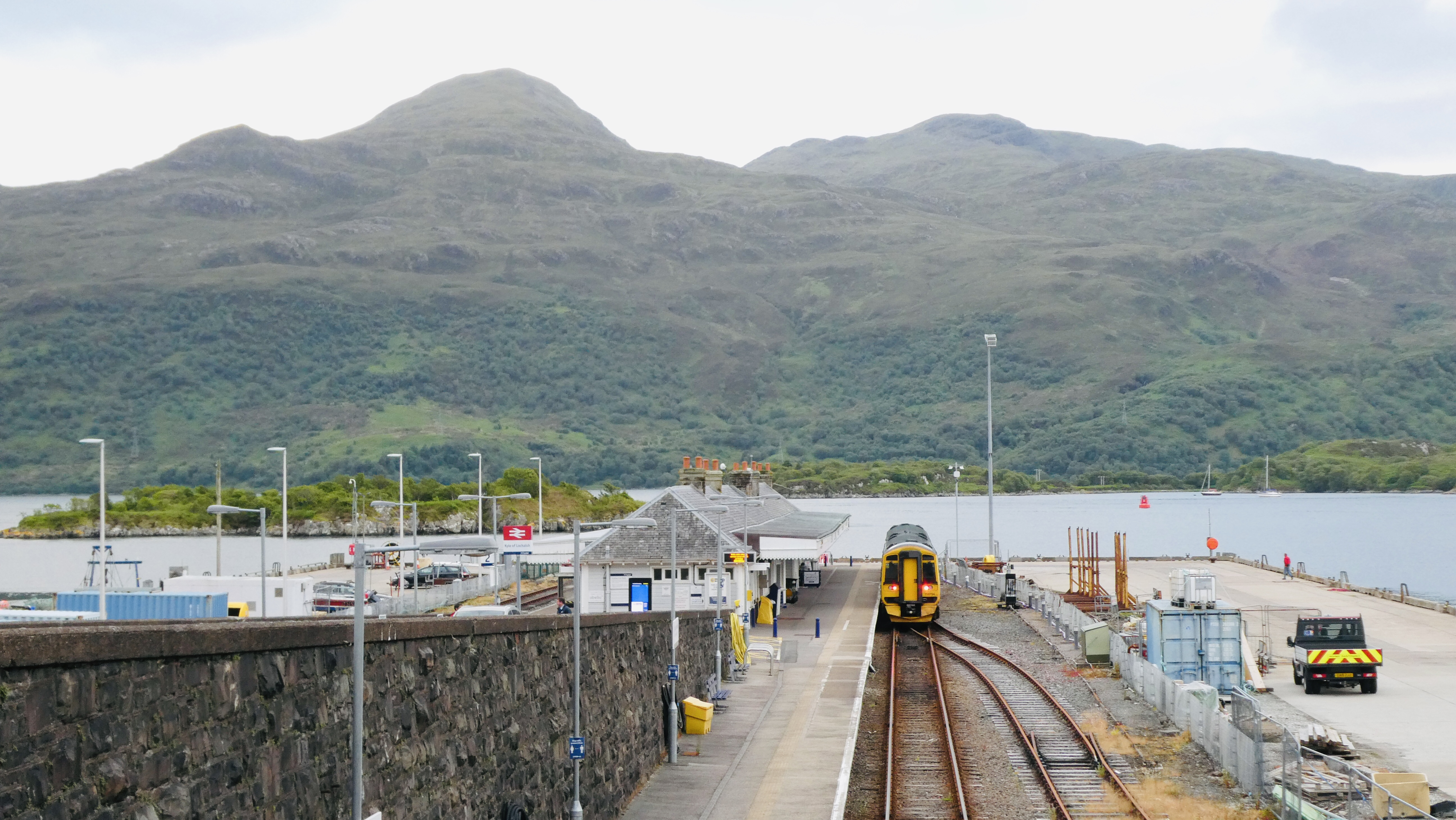
The terminus at Kyle of Lochalsh station, with the Isle of Skye in the background

A few miles southwest of Achnasheen the track reaches its highest point above sea level, as it leaves the drainage basin of the River Conon (which flows to the Cromarty Firth on the east coast) and enters the basin of the River Carron (whose estuary is on the west coast). The line meets the River Carron itself at Loch Scaven near its source, and then follows the course of the river downstream.

Close to the point where the Carron is joined by the Alltan na Feola stream lies the site of the former Glencarron station; (Note: Ordnance Survey grid reference: NH063508) this small halt closed in 1964, although some drivers continued to stop at the station unofficially, refusing to acknowledge the station's closure, until as late as the 1990s. The next open station on the line is Achnashellach, (Note: Ordnance Survey grid reference: NH003485 Mileage from Dingwall: 40 mi 34 ch (65.1 km)) some 12 miles 42 chains (20.2 km) down the line from Achnasheen; this is the longest distance between two existing consecutive stations on the line. The line then skirts the northwestern edge of Loch Dùghaill and continues to follow the River Carron until reaching Strathcarron station, (Note: Ordnance Survey grid reference: NG942421 Mileage from Dingwall: 45 mi 74 ch (73.9 km)) where the river ends as it flows into Loch Carron, a sea inlet. From here, the railway runs along the southern coastline of Loch Carron, and continues to hug the coast all the way until the terminus at Kyle of Lochalsh (except briefly near Plockton).

A short distance from Strathcarron the line reaches another station, Attadale, (Note: Ordnance Survey grid reference: NG924391 Mileage from Dingwall: 48 mi 22 ch (77.7 km)) located near the mouth of the river of the same name. Just southwest of the station, the line passes through an avalanche shelter – an unusual tunnel-like structure, approximately 270 yd (250 m), which also carries the A890 and is partially open on the loch-side; it was built in 1978 to prevent rocks from falling onto the road and track. The line then continues for nearly five more miles (8 km) until it reaches Stromeferry station, (Note: Ordnance Survey grid reference: NG865346 Mileage from Dingwall: 53 mi 15 ch (85.6 km)) adjacent to a former ferry port which linked the area with North Strome on the opposite side of the loch. Occasionally the ferry link reopens on a temporary basis, when the A890 is closed due to landslips. At Stromeferry the A890 turns south; from here, the railway does not parallel any major roads, instead simply following the coast.

The next station on the line is Duncraig, (Note: Ordnance Survey grid reference: NG811331 Mileage from Dingwall: 57 mi 09 ch (91.9 km)) which was built as a private, single-platform halt to serve Duncraig Castle; it was not made available for the public until 1949, more than 50 years after opening. Similarly to Glencarron, the station closed in 1965 but continued to be served unofficially, as drivers refused to acknowledge the station's closure; however, unlike Glencarron, Duncraig eventually reopened officially, in 1976. From here it is just over 1 mile (1.6 km) until the next station at Plockton; (Note: Ordnance Survey grid reference: NG794329 Mileage from Dingwall: 58 mi 22 ch (93.8 km)) this is the shortest distance between any two stations on the line. Plockton station is actually located about 0.6 miles (1.0 km) south of the main part of the village itself, although it lies adjacent to both the Plockton High School and the Plockton Airstrip.

The penultimate station en route is Duirinish, (Note: Ordnance Survey grid reference: NG777315 Mileage from Dingwall: 59 mi 58 ch (96.1 km)) which is also a short distance away from Plockton; the station primarily serves the villages of Duirinish and Drumbuie. From here, the line runs in a generally southerly direction, although the exact heading varies significantly as the track closely follows the jagged coast. The railway leaves the coast of Loch Carron just before entering the village of Kyle of Lochalsh; it terminates at Kyle of Lochalsh station, (Note: Ordnance Survey grid reference: NG762271 Mileage from Dingwall: 63 mi 64 ch (102.7 km)) built on a pier right on the edge of Loch Alsh, just 750 metres (2,460 ft) away from the Isle of Skye which can be seen across the loch.

== Infrastructure ==
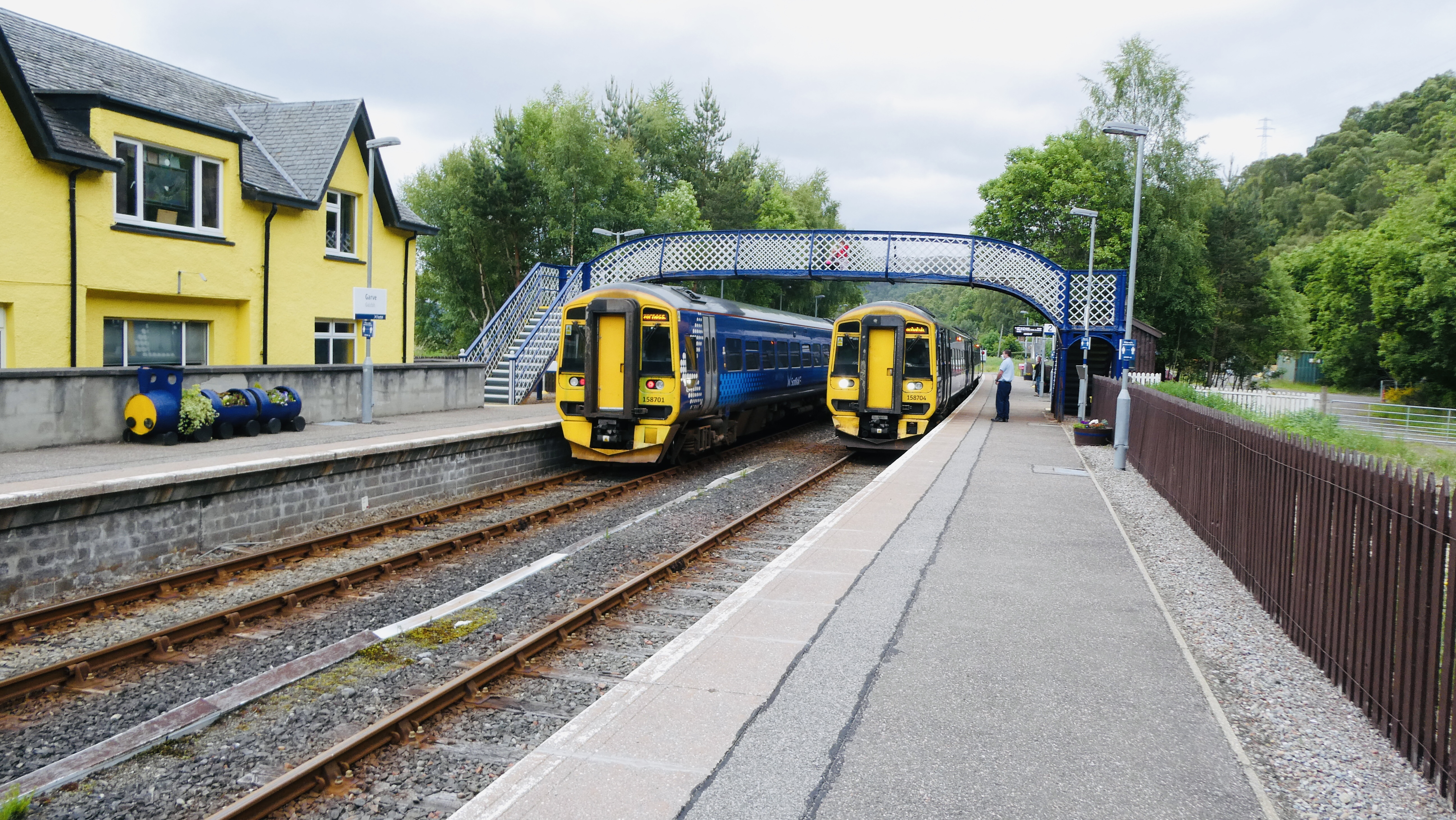
Two Class 158s passing each other at Garve station, one of the passing loops on the line.

The full line between Dingwall and Kyle of Lochalsh is 63 miles 64 chains (102.7 km). It is almost entirely single-track, except for four double-track passing loops at Dingwall, Garve, Achnasheen and Strathcarron, and the two platforms and two sidings at Kyle of Lochalsh. The entire line is unelectrified.

The whole line, together with the Far North Line, is signalled using the Radio Electronic Token Block system, which is very cost-effective in both implementation and maintenance, but significantly limits the capacity of the lines.

Along the route there are 29 bridges, 31 cuttings, and a single tunnel.

== History ==
The route was built in two parts: the Dingwall and Skye Railway, between Dingwall and Stromeferry, opened on 19 August 1870, and the Kyle of Lochalsh Extension (Highland Railway), which continued the line from Stromeferry to Kyle of Lochalsh, opened on 2 November 1897. Dingwall station itself had been open since 1862, as an intermediate station on the Inverness and Ross-shire Railway (part of the modern-day Far North Line). The 10-mile extension from Stromeferry was, at that time, per mile, the most expensive stretch of railway ever built in the UK. This was due to the amount of rock to be blasted through to make the 31 cuttings required, and the construction of 29 bridges.

The Strathpeffer Branch operated between 1885 and 1951.

In 1933, the London, Midland and Scottish Railway introduced two named trains on the line, The Hebridean and The Lewisman.

In July 1939 a landslide between Attadale and Stomeferry, which was the result of earlier heavy rain, derailed an engine and six freight vans.

In 1949 it was planned to relocate Lochluichart station to allow the flooding of the area by the Glascarnoch-Luichart-Torr Achilty hydroelectric scheme. On 3 May 1954 a new station was opened as Lochluichart. The deviation required about two miles (three kilometres) on stone-pitched embankments and in rock cuttings, a 100-foot (30 m) bridge over the River Conon and a 36-foot (11 m) bridge.

In the 1960s the line was listed to be closed under the Reshaping of British Railways report; however it was reprieved and services continued.

In 1970, British Rail wanted to close the line when Ross and Cromarty council voted to create a new £460,000 (equivalent to £6,300,000 in 2025) ferry terminal at Ullapool (43 nmi or 80 km from Stornoway) replacing that at Kyle of Lochalsh (71 nmi or 131 km from Stornoway). In December 1971 it was reported that the costs of operating the line were £318,000 per annum (equivalent to £4,020,000 in 2025), with revenue of £51,000 per annum (equivalent to £640,000 in 2025), and the Secretary of State for Transport agreed that the line should close, but a spirited local campaign again succeeded in reversing this decision and keeping it open.

In February 1989 the bridge over the River Ness in Inverness was washed away, leaving both the Kyle line and the Far North Line stranded, but new Class 156 "Sprinter" trains were brought over by road, and a temporary yard was built to service them at Muir of Ord. The line reopened in May 1990.

== Services ==
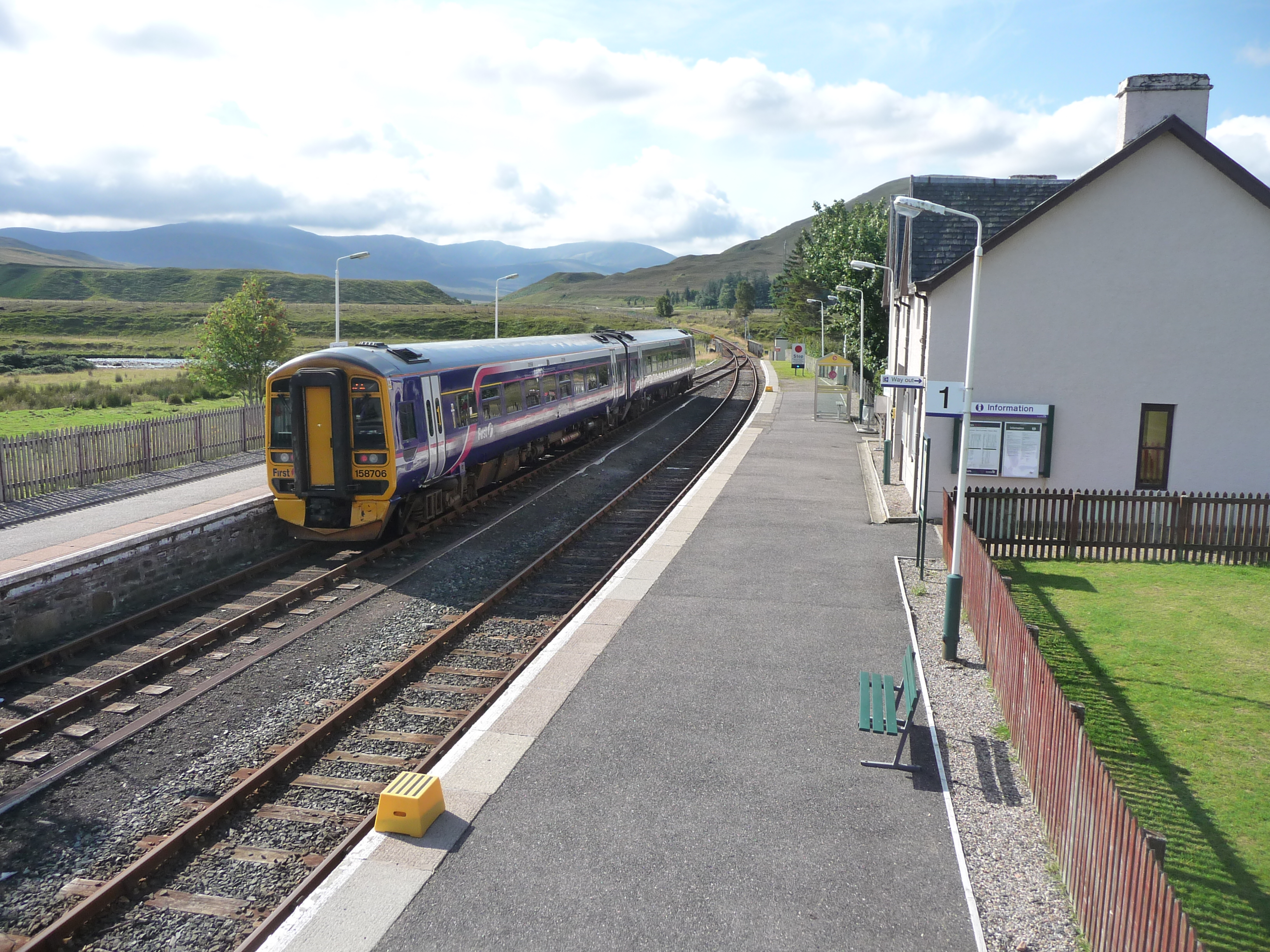
A Class 158 at Achnasheen station

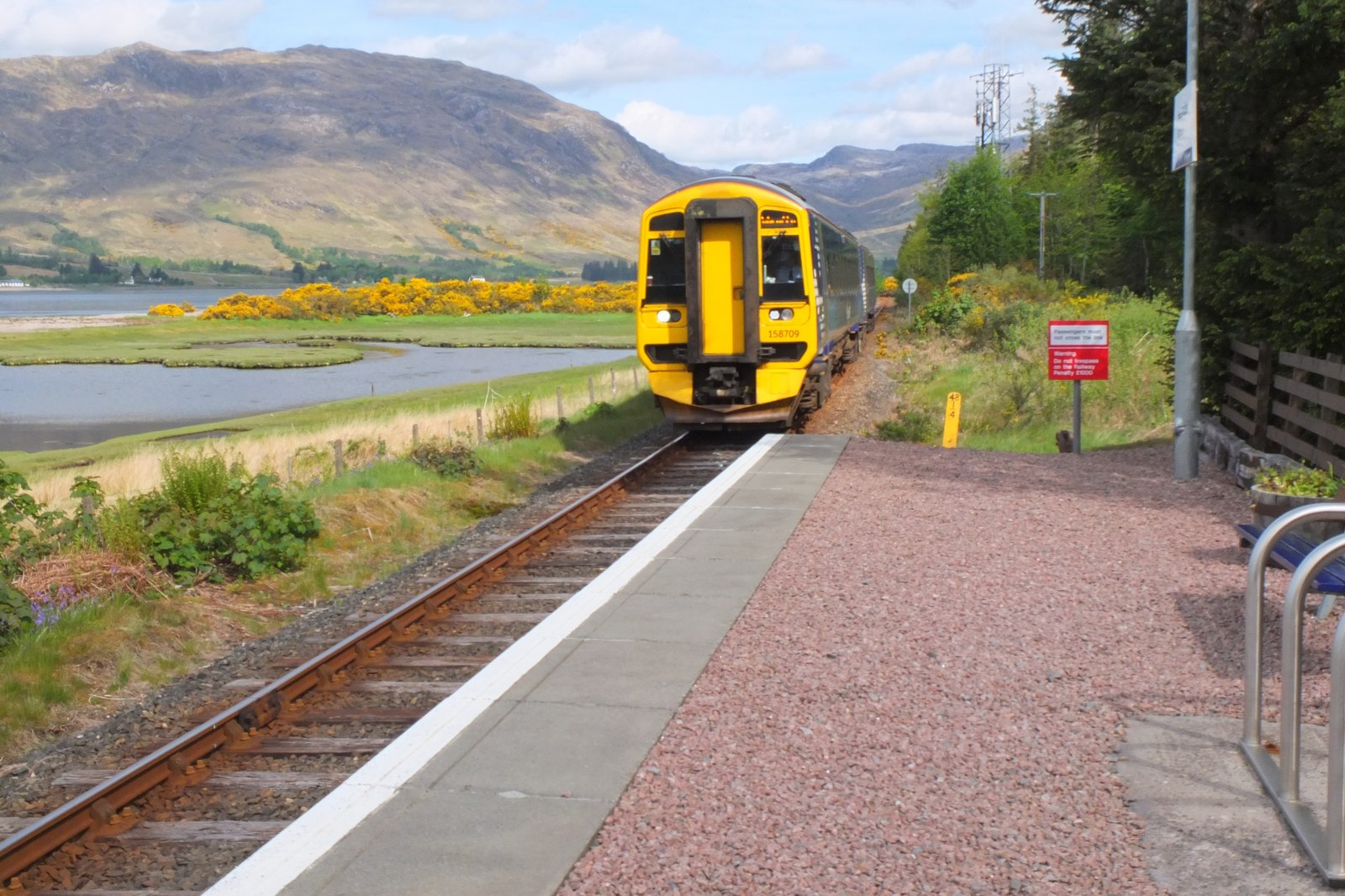
Attadale station is a request stop.

As of April 2022, the Monday−Saturday service pattern on the line consists of four trains per day running eastbound from Kyle of Lochalsh to Inverness (via Dingwall and the Far North Line), and four trains per day westbound from Inverness to Kyle of Lochalsh. On Sundays there is just one train per day each way, increasing to two per day during the summer months. ScotRail operates all services on the line with its Class 158/7 "Express Sprinter" diesel multiple units.

All services call at every intermediate station en route, although Lochluichart, Achanalt, Achnashellach, Attadale, Duncraig and Duirinish stations are request stops: passengers wishing to board the train at these stations must flag the train by raising their arm, while those wishing to alight must inform the Conductor to arrange for the train to stop. If there are no passengers wishing to get on or off the train at a request stop, it will pass through without stopping.

Services between Inverness and Kyle of Lochalsh typically have a journey time of about 2 hours 40 minutes end-to-end.

== Passenger volumes ==
Passenger volumes on the Kyle of Lochalsh line
Entries and exits	2002–03	2004–05	2005–06	2006–07	2007–08	2008–09	2009–10	2010–11	2011–12	2012–13	2013–14	2014–15	2015–16	2016–17	2017–18	2018–19	2019–20	2020–21	2021–22	2022–23
(Inverness)	721,358	822,928	873,011	915,840	975,570	1,043,712	1,070,924	1,127,718	1,180,160	1,213,382	1,282,445	1,303,662	1,306,556	1,259,496	1,238,770	1,243,338	1,214,648	231,894	753,228	974,808
(Beauly)	21,337	26,616	28,384	35,860	41,878	52,422	51,094	49,858	54,536	55,236	57,946	57,446	59,406	52,870	51,522	48,270	46,510	14,918	30,178	36,588
(Muir of Ord)	22,055	24,365	24,783	32,573	39,200	51,104	57,396	62,428	74,462	74,064	72,832	66,576	66,480	64,480	64,820	67,554	70,850	13,556	41,230	47,688
(Conon Bridge) (Note: Did not open until February 2013.)	–	–	–	–	–	–	–	–	–	3,788	18,114	15,510	15,276	15,494	15,100	17,530	18,022	2,598	9,212	10,898
Dingwall	31,849	34,898	43,508	55,034	64,404	72,086	80,324	84,920	101,730	104,746	101,996	87,782	82,508	80,900	86,276	81,408	80,154	9,864	46,524	55,536
Garve	7,128	7,092	9,471	9,690	9,847	8,546	6,898	5,814	5,038	5,384	5,028	5,076	4,676	3,668	4,302	3,212	3,480	426	2,560	3,290
Lochluichart	302	171	306	267	440	218	392	324	442	400	612	482	608	532	632	180	198	24	130	182
Achanalt	186	192	198	173	208	230	202	200	162	164	228	482	312	424	434	394	326	26	342	282
Achnasheen	2,147	2,379	2,471	2,697	2,974	3,202	3,614	3,698	3,998	3,566	3,972	3,722	3,700	3,076	3,310	3,284	3,234	620	2,420	3,302
Achnashellach	664	691	593	540	655	646	778	738	1,084	1,054	976	800	1,078	878	870	820	836	130	650	752
Strathcarron	7,842	8,658	9,289	7,856	8,585	8,310	8,234	8,122	11,010	9,304	8,950	8,262	8,162	7,678	7,742	6,970	7,224	1,192	5,370	5,524
Attadale	216	325	398	439	469	472	478	526	968	658	998	784	820	938	1,170	1,322	1,228	62	764	1,042
Stromeferry	1,166	1,035	1,163	1,146	1,012	1,000	1,064	1,438	2,218	2,074	1,874	1,634	1,560	1,254	1,378	1,274	1,508	136	918	1,144
Duncraig	288	463	391	342	485	388	394	602	722	784	534	448	494	348	408	484	500	30	376	462
Plockton	7,960	8,934	7,992	8,295	8,605	9,230	10,716	11,186	13,038	12,886	13,876	12,826	11,574	9,998	10,592	11,482	11,616	1,784	9,476	8,530
Duirinish	519	601	608	841	801	742	620	808	702	804	970	1,048	1,064	930	918	856	878	156	554	614
Kyle of Lochalsh	41,243	44,263	44,770	46,749	48,290	52,672	60,164	60,528	66,272	66,828	67,278	64,256	65,706	62,704	65,182	60,606	57,786	7,858	40,702	46,634

- The statistics shown for all stations between Inverness and Dingwall inclusive include all passenger entries and exits at those stations, not only passengers travelling on the Kyle of Lochalsh line.
- Stations between Inverness and Dingwall are also included for reference, as all trains on the line also call there.
- Stations in italics are request stops.
- The statistics cover twelve-month periods that start in April.

== Future ==
In the Scottish Government's National Transport Strategy, published in February 2020, it was stated that the line would not be electrified with overhead lines, but rather, an alternative to diesel traction will be used for the route.

== Kyle of Lochalsh line in film and books ==
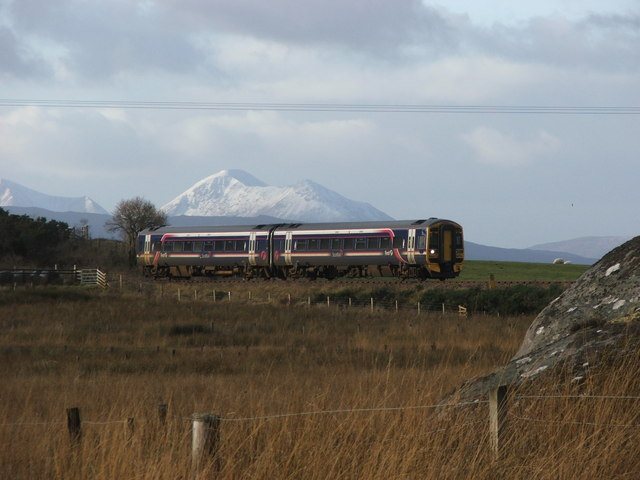
The line near Duirinish station; the Isle of Skye can be seen in the background with a covering of snow.

The Kyle of Lochalsh line was featured in Eddie McConnell's lyrical documentary The Line to Skye (1973) with commentary by Scottish writer William McIlvanney, commissioned as part of Ross & Cromarty's campaign to keep the line open at a time when it was threatened with closure. The film follows the train from Inverness to Kyle of Lochalsh, describing the communities, landscape and wildlife along its route, while contrasting the frustration of motorists with the relaxation of the journey by rail.

In Stephen Durrell's 1939 documentary West of Inverness, the importance of the Kyle of Lochalsh line to the crofters of the West Highlands is demonstrated through its role of transporting passengers, mail, parcels, food and livestock to and from their communities. The film shows the LMS steam locomotives that operated the line at this time.

In the episode of Great Railway Journeys of the World "Confessions of a Trainspotter" (1980), Michael Palin travels from London to the Kyle of Lochalsh and returns with the railway station's sign.

Video 125 Ltd. produced a driver's eye view documentary of the line in 1987, when the service was still operated using loco-hauled trains, in this case motive power being provided by Class 37 no. 37262 named Dounreay after the nuclear power station. Narration was by Paul Coia.

Nicholas Whittaker travelled the line both ways during the summer of 1973, an experience he wrote about in his 1995 book Platform Souls.

As with the other railway lines of the western Highlands (the West Highland Railway and the Callander and Oban Railway), John Thomas wrote a history, The Skye Railway.

The line makes brief cameo appearances in the television series Hamish Macbeth.
