= Achnashellach railway station =

Railway station in Highland, Scotland

Achnashellach Scottish Gaelic: Achadh nan Seileach
- Achnashellach station in November 2019

General information
- Location: Achnashellach, Highland; Scotland
- Coordinates: 57.4821°N 5.3331°W
- Grid reference: NH002484
- Manager: ScotRail
- Platforms: 1

Other information
- Station code: ACH

History
- Original company: Dingwall and Skye Railway
- Pre-grouping: Highland Railway
- Post-grouping: LMSR

Key dates
- August 1870: Station opened

Passengers
- 2021/22: ▲650
- 2022/23: ▲752
- 2023/24: ▲1,004
- 2024/25: ▼890
- 2025/26: ▲1,030
Location
Notes
- Passenger statistics from the Office of Rail and Road

Achnashellach railway station is a railway station serving Achnashellach on the Kyle of Lochalsh Line, in Wester Ross, Scotland. The station lies between Strathcarron and Achnasheen, 40 miles 34 chains (65.1 km) from Dingwall. ScotRail, who manage the station, operate all services.

== History ==
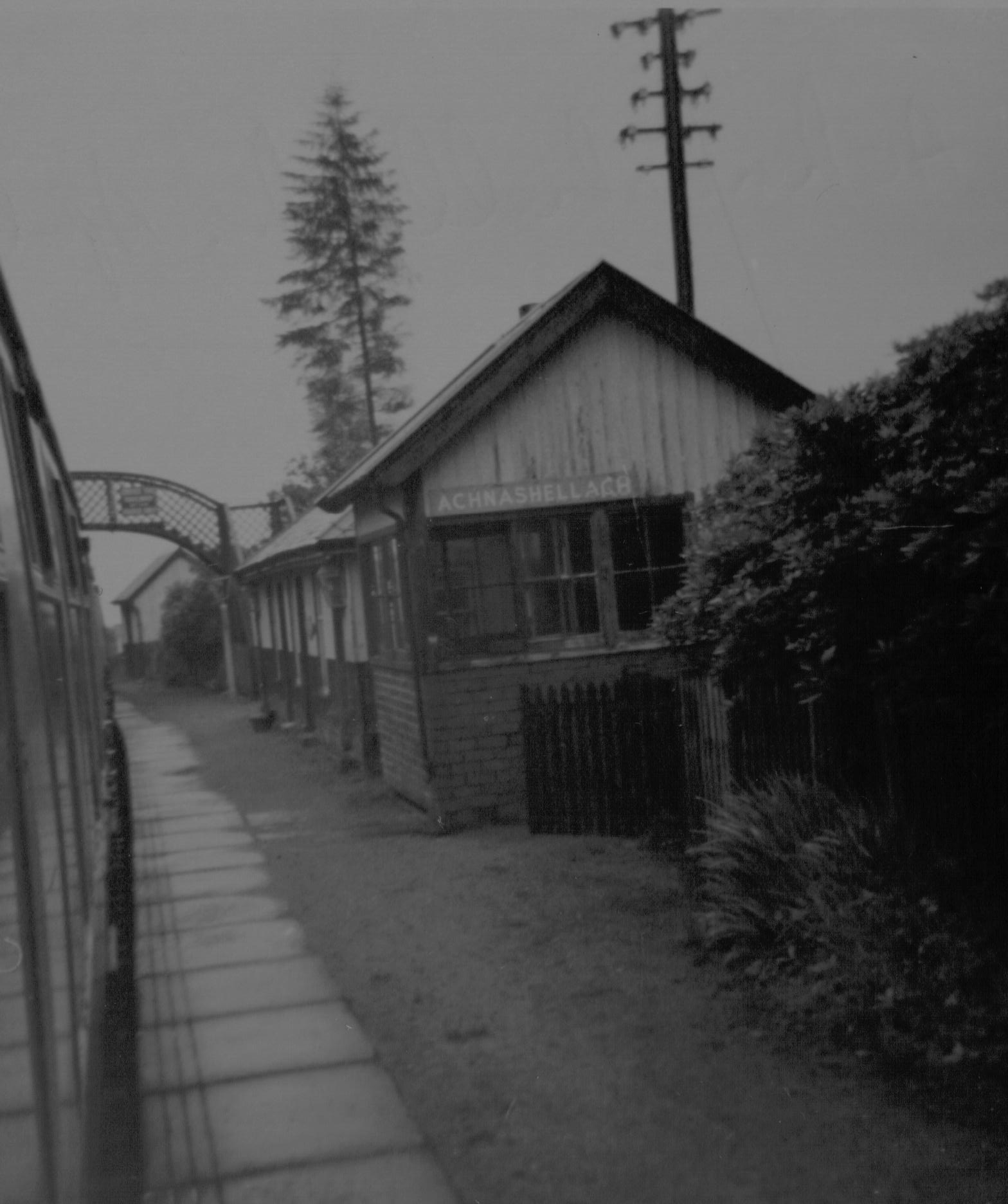
The station seen in 1970

The station was privately opened by the Dingwall and Skye Railway in August 1870, primarily to serve Achnashellach Lodge near Loch Dughaill, but was operated from the outset by the Highland Railway (HR), and only opened to the public a year later, on 1 May 1871. The passing loop at the station was removed in 1966 and the wooden station buildings in 1970, although the remains of the second platform are partially visible. The former station house remains in situ.

=== Accidents and incidents ===
On 14 October 1892, Achnashellach was the scene of a runaway train in which the brake in the brake van had malfunctioned. Subsequently, this train moved off down the slope at considerable speed without a locomotive to keep it under control. Reaching the bottom of the slope, it had enough energy to proceed back uphill, before running down the slope once again. Unfortunately, another train was approaching Achnashellach in the opposite direction at that very moment, and the two trains collided at the bottom of the slope with great force. Eight passengers were injured, though none seriously, and the track was not damaged with only minor damage occurring to the rolling stock.

== Facilities ==
Facilities, like at many other stations on the line, are incredibly basic, comprising just a shelter, help point and bike racks, although the station is fully accessible. As there are no facilities to purchase tickets, passengers must buy one in advance, or from the guard on the train.

== Passenger volume ==
The main origin or destination station for journeys to or from Achnashellach in the 2022–23 period was Inverness, making up 410 of the 752 journeys (54.5%). Most users of the station are walkers, as only a few houses are nearby.

Passenger Volume at Achnashellach
	2004–05	2005–06	2006–07	2007–08	2008–09	2009–10	2010–11	2011–12	2012–13	2013–14	2014–15	2015–16	2016–17	2017–18	2018–19	2019–20	2020–21	2021–22	2022–23	2023–24	2024–25
Entries and exits	691	593	540	655	646	778	738	1,084	1,054	976	800	1,078	878	870	820	836	130	650	752	1,004	890

The statistics cover twelve month periods that start in April.

== Services ==
Four trains each way call (on request) on weekdays and Saturdays, and one each way all year on Sundays, plus a second from May to late September only.

Preceding station	National Rail	Following station
Achnasheen	ScotRail; Kyle of Lochalsh Line	Strathcarron
	Historical railways	
Glencarron Platform	Highland Railway; Dingwall and Skye Railway	Strathcarron

== Bibliography ==
- Brailsford, Martyn, ed. (December 2017) [1987]. Railway Track Diagrams 1: Scotland & Isle of Man (6th ed.). Frome: Trackmaps. ISBN 978-0-9549866-9-8.
- Butt, R. V. J. (October 1995). The Directory of Railway Stations: details every public and private passenger station, halt, platform and stopping place, past and present (1st ed.). Sparkford: Patrick Stephens Ltd. ISBN 978-1-85260-508-7. OCLC 60251199. OL 11956311M.
- Caton, Peter (2018). Remote Stations. Leicestershire: Matador. ISBN 978-1-78901-408-2.
- Quick, Michael (2022). Railway Passenger Stations in Great Britain: A Chronology (PDF) (5th ed.). London: Railway and Canal Historical Society. Archived from the original (PDF) on 15 March 2023.
