= Achanalt railway station =

Railway station in Highland, Scotland

Achanalt Scottish Gaelic: Achadh nan Allt
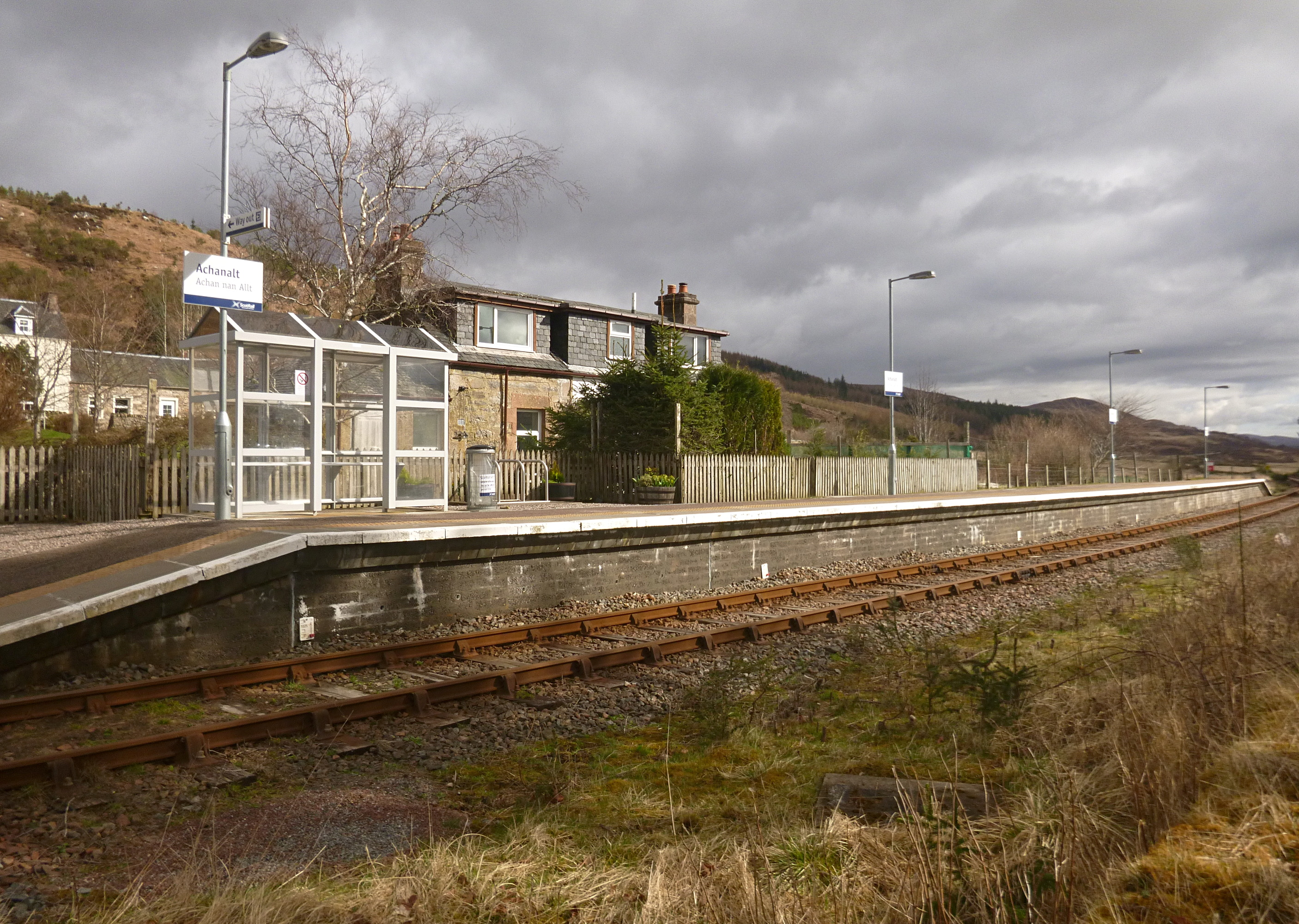

General information
- Location: Achanalt, Highland; Scotland
- Coordinates: 57.6096°N 4.9135°W
- Grid reference: NH260614
- Manager: ScotRail
- Platforms: 1

Other information
- Station code: AAT

History
- Original company: Dingwall and Skye Railway
- Pre-grouping: Highland Railway
- Post-grouping: LMSR

Key dates
- 19 August 1870: Station opened

Passengers
- 2021/22: ▲342
- 2022/23: ▼282
- 2023/24: ▲506
- 2024/25: ▲550
- 2025/26: ▼352
Location
Notes
- Passenger statistics from the Office of Rail and Road

Achanalt railway station is a geographically remote railway station on the Kyle of Lochalsh Line, serving the village of Achanalt in the north of Scotland. The station is 21 miles 34 chains (34.5 km) from Dingwall, between Lochluichart and Achnasheen. ScotRail, who manage the station, operate all services.

== History ==
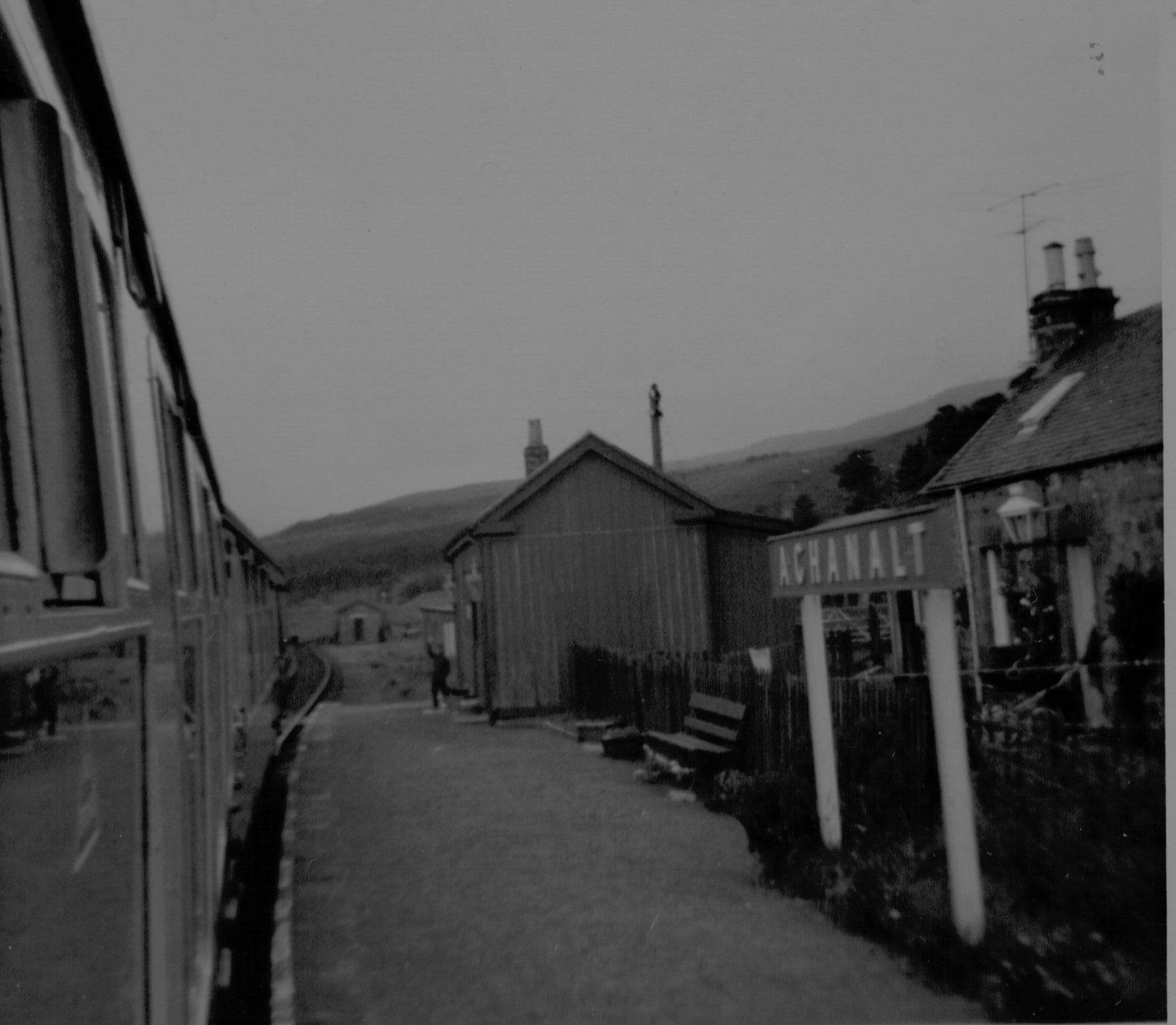
The station seen in 1970

The station was opened by the Dingwall and Skye Railway on 19 August 1870, but operated from the outset by the Highland Railway. It may have originally been known as Achanault, prior to 1877.

== Facilities ==
Facilities here, as with many other stations down the line, are minimal, comprising just a shelter, some bike racks and a small car park. The station is step-free to the car park. As there are no facilities to purchase tickets, passengers must buy one in advance, or from the guard on the train.

== Passenger volume ==
The main origin or destination station for journeys to or from Achanalt in the 2022–23 period was Dingwall, making up 204 of the 282 journeys (72.3%). The station was the second least used station in the whole of the United Kingdom in the 2022/23 year.

Passenger Volume at Achanalt
	2004–05	2005–06	2006–07	2007–08	2008–09	2009–10	2010–11	2011–12	2012–13	2013–14	2014–15	2015–16	2016–17	2017–18	2018–19	2019–20	2020–21	2021–22	2022–23	2023–24	2024–25
Entries and exits	192	198	173	208	230	202	200	162	164	228	482	312	424	434	394	326	26	342	282	506	550

The statistics cover twelve month periods that start in April.

== Services ==
Four trains each way call (on request) on weekdays/Saturdays, and one each way all year on Sundays, plus a second from May to late September only.

Preceding station	National Rail	Following station
Lochluichart	ScotRail; Kyle of Lochalsh Line	Achnasheen
	Historical railways	
Lochluichart (Old); Line open; Station closed	Highland Railway; Dingwall and Skye Railway	Achnasheen; Line and Station open

== Bibliography ==
- Brailsford, Martyn, ed. (December 2017) [1987]. Railway Track Diagrams 1: Scotland & Isle of Man (6th ed.). Frome: Trackmaps. ISBN 978-0-9549866-9-8.
- Butt, R. V. J. (October 1995). The Directory of Railway Stations: details every public and private passenger station, halt, platform and stopping place, past and present (1st ed.). Sparkford: Patrick Stephens Ltd. ISBN 978-1-85260-508-7. OCLC 60251199. OL 11956311M.
- Jowett, Alan (March 1989). Jowett's Railway Atlas of Great Britain and Ireland: From Pre-Grouping to the Present Day (1st ed.). Sparkford: Patrick Stephens Ltd. ISBN 978-1-85260-086-0. OCLC 22311137.
- Jowett, Alan (2000). Jowett's Nationalised Railway Atlas (1st ed.). Penryn, Cornwall: Atlantic Transport Publishers. ISBN 978-0-906899-99-1. OCLC 228266687.
- Quick, Michael (2022). Railway Passenger Stations in Great Britain: A Chronology (PDF) (5th ed.). London: Railway and Canal Historical Society. Archived from the original (PDF) on 15 March 2023.
