= Attadale railway station =

Railway station in Highland, Scotland

Attadale Scottish Gaelic: Atadal
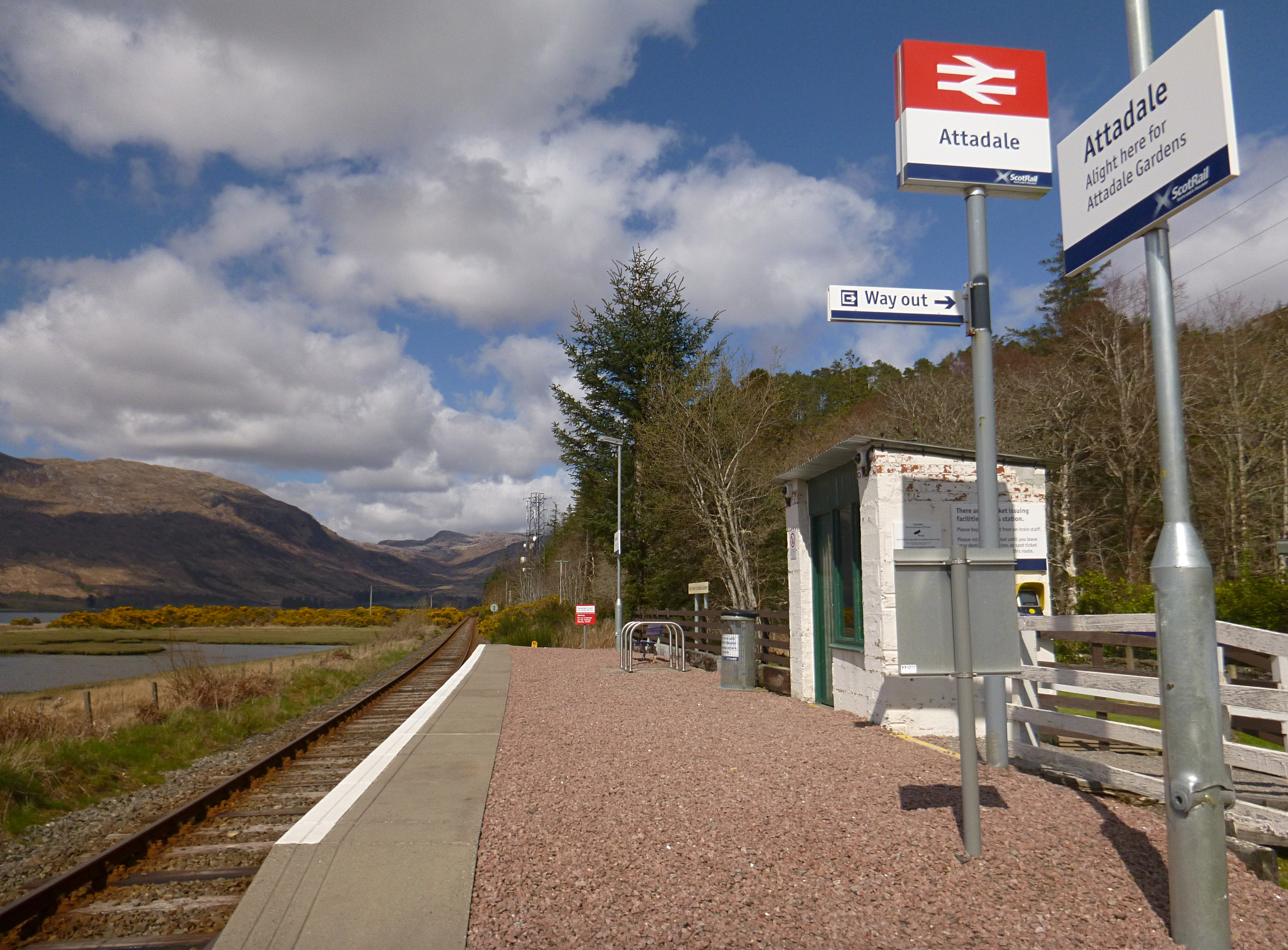

General information
- Location: Attadale, Highland; Scotland
- Coordinates: 57.3945°N 5.4553°W
- Grid reference: NG924390
- Manager: ScotRail
- Platforms: 1

Other information
- Station code: ATT

History
- Original company: Dingwall and Skye Railway
- Pre-grouping: Highland Railway
- Post-grouping: LMSR

Key dates
- 1880: Station opened

Passengers
- 2021/22: ▲764
- 2022/23: ▲1,042
- 2023/24: ▲1,344
- 2024/25: ▼1,034
- 2025/26: ▲1,342
Location
Notes
- Passenger statistics from the Office of Rail and Road

Attadale railway station is a remote railway station on the Kyle of Lochalsh Line, serving the village of Attadale on Loch Carron in the Highlands, northern Scotland. The station is 48 miles 22 chains (77.7 km) from Dingwall, between Strathcarron and Stromeferry. ScotRail, who manage the station, operate all services.

== History ==
The station was opened in 1880 by the Highland Railway, even though the line through Attadale had been opened ten years earlier. Some give the opening date of the station as 1875 or 1877, but only as a private halt, affirming its public opening in 1880.

== Facilities ==
The platform has a waiting room, help point, bench and bike racks. The station is not step-free. As there are no facilities to purchase tickets, passengers must buy one in advance, or from the guard on the train.

== Passenger volume ==
Passenger Volume at Attadale
	2004–05	2005–06	2006–07	2007–08	2008–09	2009–10	2010–11	2011–12	2012–13	2013–14	2014–15	2015–16	2016–17	2017–18	2018–19	2019–20	2020–21	2021–22	2022–23	2023–24	2024–25
Entries and exits	325	398	439	469	472	478	526	968	658	998	784	820	938	1,170	1,322	1,228	62	764	1,042	1,344	1,034

The statistics cover twelve month periods that start in April.

== Services ==
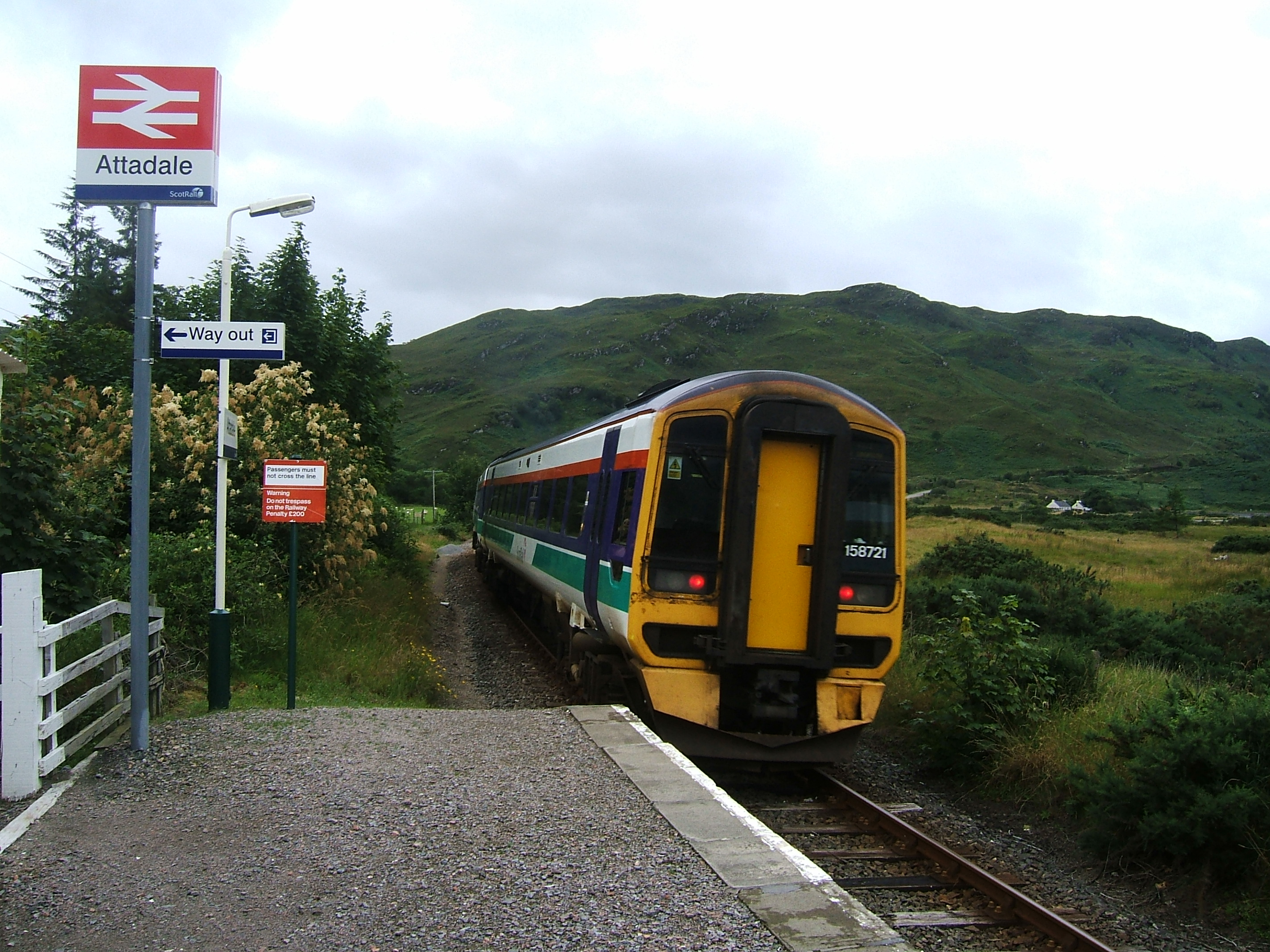
A Class 158 DMU departing Attadale bound for Kyle of Lochalsh

Four trains each way call (on request) on weekdays/Saturdays and one each way all year on Sundays, plus a second from May to late September only.

Preceding station	National Rail	Following station
Strathcarron	ScotRail; Kyle of Lochalsh Line	Stromeferry
	Historical railways	
Strathcarron; Line and station open	Highland Railway; Dingwall and Skye Railway	Stromeferry; Line and station open

== Cultural references ==
The station featured in episode one of the Channel 4 documentary series Paul Merton's Secret Stations on 1 May 2016, when presenter Paul Merton alighted there en route to visiting a salmon breeding farm on the shores of Loch Carron.

== Bibliography ==
- Brailsford, Martyn, ed. (December 2017) [1987]. Railway Track Diagrams 1: Scotland & Isle of Man (6th ed.). Frome: Trackmaps. ISBN 978-0-9549866-9-8.
- Butt, R. V. J. (October 1995). The Directory of Railway Stations: details every public and private passenger station, halt, platform and stopping place, past and present (1st ed.). Sparkford: Patrick Stephens Ltd. ISBN 978-1-85260-508-7. OCLC 60251199. OL 11956311M.
- Jowett, Alan (2000). Jowett's Nationalised Railway Atlas (1st ed.). Penryn, Cornwall: Atlantic Transport Publishers. ISBN 978-0-906899-99-1. OCLC 228266687.
- Jowett, Alan (March 1989). Jowett's Railway Atlas of Great Britain and Ireland: From Pre-Grouping to the Present Day (1st ed.). Sparkford: Patrick Stephens Ltd. ISBN 978-1-85260-086-0. OCLC 22311137.
- Quick, Michael (2022). Railway Passenger Stations in Great Britain: A Chronology (PDF) (5th ed.). London: Railway and Canal Historical Society.
- Vallance, H.A.; Clinker, C.R.; Lambert, Anthony J. (1985) [1938]. The Highland Railway (4th ed.). Newton Abbot: David & Charles. ISBN 0-946537-24-0.
