= Glencarron Platform railway station =

Disused railway station in Highland, Scotland

Glencarron Platform
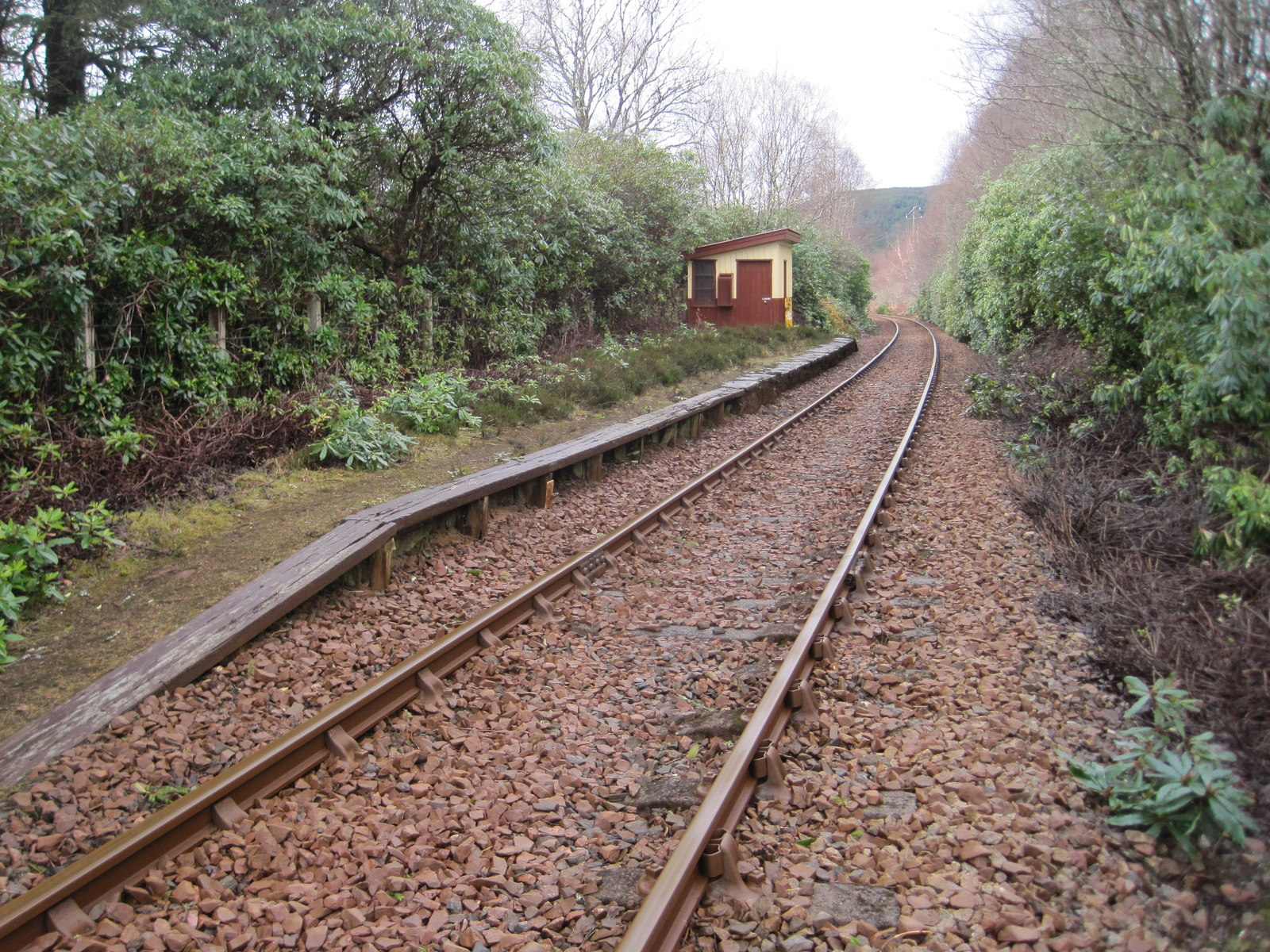
- The disused platform in 2015, looking west

General information
- Location: Glen Carron, Highland; Scotland
- Coordinates: 57.5059°N 5.2349°W
- Grid reference: NH063508
- Platforms: 1

Other information
- Status: Disused

History
- Original company: Dingwall and Skye Railway
- Pre-grouping: Highland Railway
- Post-grouping: London, Midland and Scottish Railway

Key dates
- 1873: opened
- 1964: closed
Location

Glencarron Platform was an intermediate halt on the Dingwall and Skye Railway between Achnashellach and Achnasheen. It was 36 miles 19 chains (58.3 km) from Dingwall, and had a single platform.

It was built in 1873 for the benefit of a local landowner to serve his hunting lodge, in exchange for which the landowner authorised the railway to cross his land and bought a sizeable shareholding in the cash-strapped concern. Delightfully located in the isolated Glen Carron, the platform eventually began to be used by regular members of the travelling public alighting to explore the landscape or rejoining the train after walks. It was officially made a public station in 1887. However, this traffic was not very substantial and along with two other Kyle line stations – Achterneed and Duncraig – it was closed in 1964 as part of the Beeching Report.

Occasionally trains continued to call, wholly unofficially, at both Glencarron and Duncraig. In 1974 Duncraig was restored to the public timetable. Glencarron was not accorded this honour and remained an unofficial stopping place, on prior request to the traincrew, into the 1990s. As an unofficial stopping place it received no maintenance and steadily decayed.

| Preceding station | Historical railways | Following station |
|---|---|---|
| Achnasheen; Line and Station open | Highland Railway; Dingwall and Skye Railway | Achnashellach; Line and Station open |
