= Kyle of Lochalsh railway station =

Railway station in Highland, Scotland

Kyle of Lochalsh Scottish Gaelic: Caol Loch Aillse
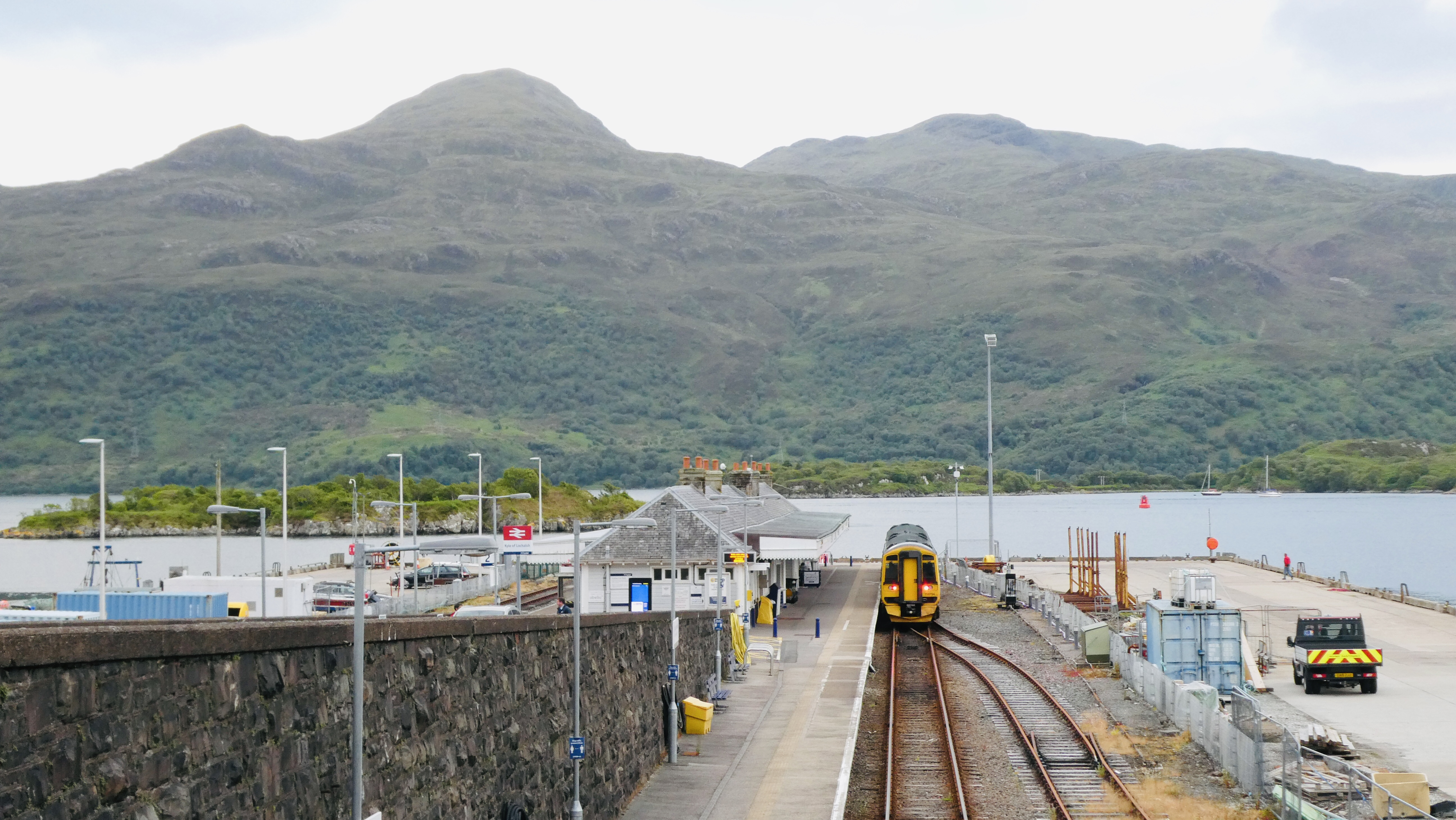
- 158704 standing at Kyle of Lochalsh, with the Isle of Skye visible in the distance

General information
- Location: Kyle of Lochalsh, Highland; Scotland
- Coordinates: 57.2800°N 5.7138°W
- Grid reference: NG762271
- Manager: ScotRail
- Platforms: 2

Other information
- Station code: KYL

History
- Original company: Highland Railway
- Pre-grouping: Highland Railway
- Post-grouping: LMS

Key dates
- 2 November 1897: Opened

Passengers
- 2021/22: ▲40,702
- 2022/23: ▲46,634
- 2023/24: ▲53,584
- 2024/25: ▼46,788
- 2025/26: ▲48,000

Listed Building – Category B
- Designated: 16 December 1986
- Reference no.: LB6954
Location
Notes
- Passenger statistics from the Office of Rail and Road

Kyle of Lochalsh railway station is the terminus of the Kyle of Lochalsh Line in the village of Kyle of Lochalsh in the Highlands, northern Scotland. The station is 63 miles 64 chains (102.7 km) from Dingwall. ScotRail, who manage the station, operate all of the services here.

== History ==
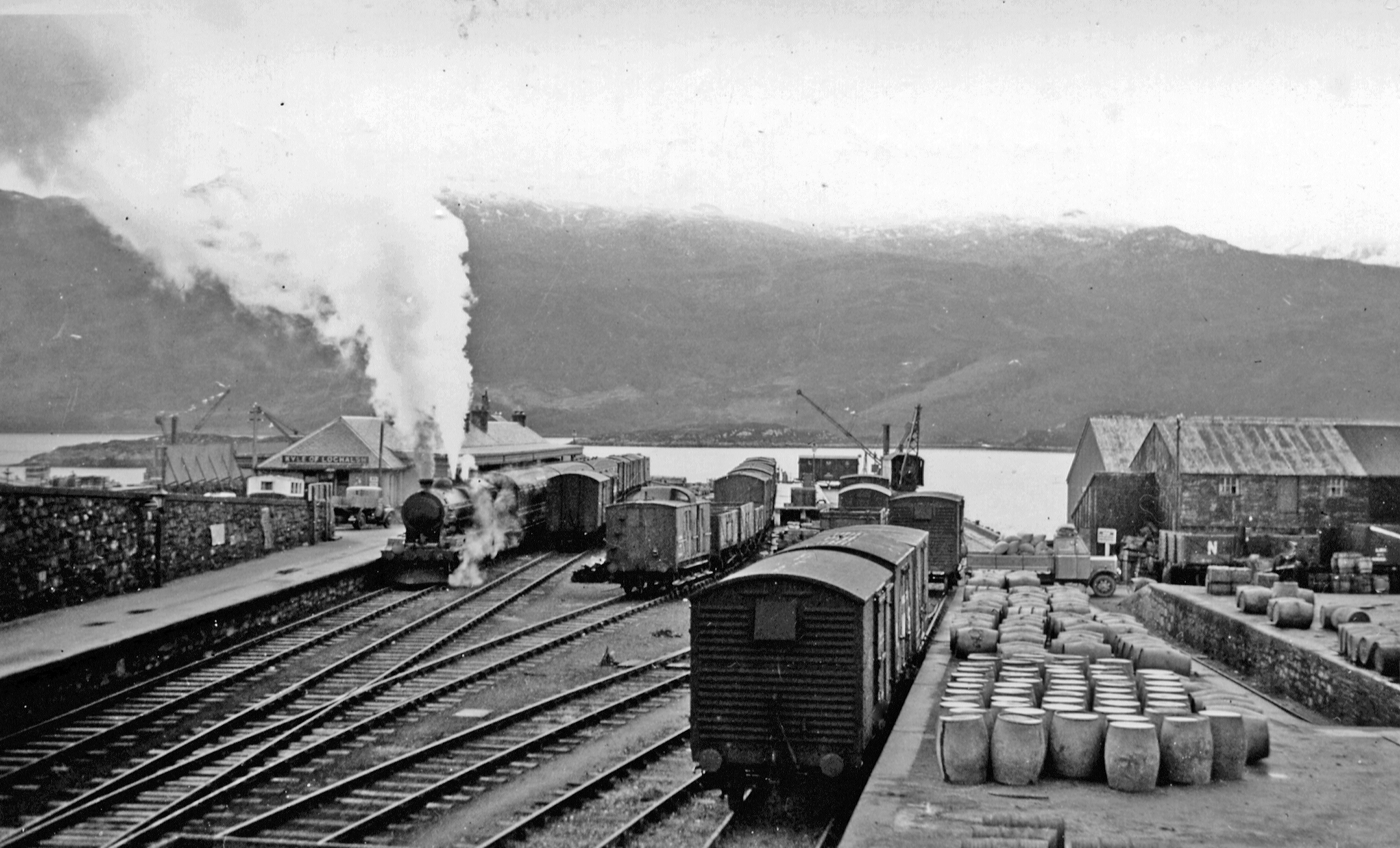
Kyle station in 1939

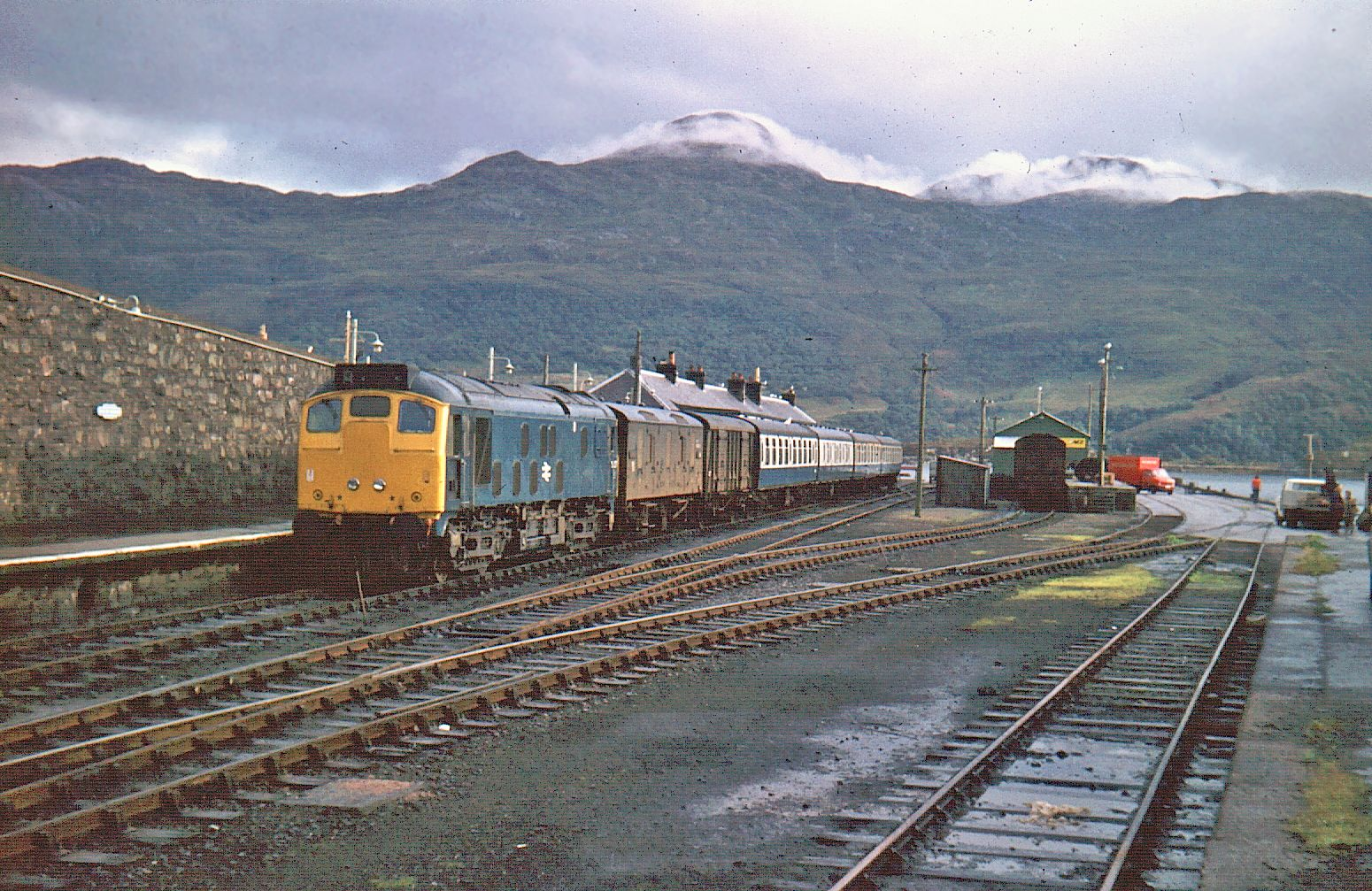
Kyle station in September 1973

The station was opened on 2 November 1897 by the Highland Railway, following the completion of the extension of the Dingwall and Skye Railway from Stromeferry. The extension took more than four years to complete due to the unforgiving nature of the terrain through which it was driven - 29 bridges had to be constructed and more than 30 cuttings excavated through solid rock, which led to it costing £20,000 per mile (making it the most expensive rail route to be built in the UK at the time). As built, the station consisted of a broad island platform on a pier next to the water's edge and a chalet-style station building close to the western end. Several sidings were provided, along with a signal box and small locomotive shed. The station was host to two LMS caravans from 1935 to 1937 followed by one caravan in 1938 to 1939.

Originally the station provided a connection to the ferry services for the Outer Hebrides. However, as the ferry terminal at the Kyle of Lochalsh was 71 miles (114 km) from Stornoway, in 1970 Ross and Cromarty council voted to create a new £460,000 (equivalent to £6,309,300 in 2025) ferry terminal at Ullapool which was only 43 miles (69 km) from Stornoway.

The signal box closed in 1984, when Radio Electronic Token Block working was introduced on the line by British Rail - although no longer operational it is still intact and has been adapted for use as a holiday cottage.

The station is located next to the piers that used to offer sailings to Skye, the ferries being superseded on 16 October 1995 by the Skye Bridge that lies close to the station.

== Facilities ==
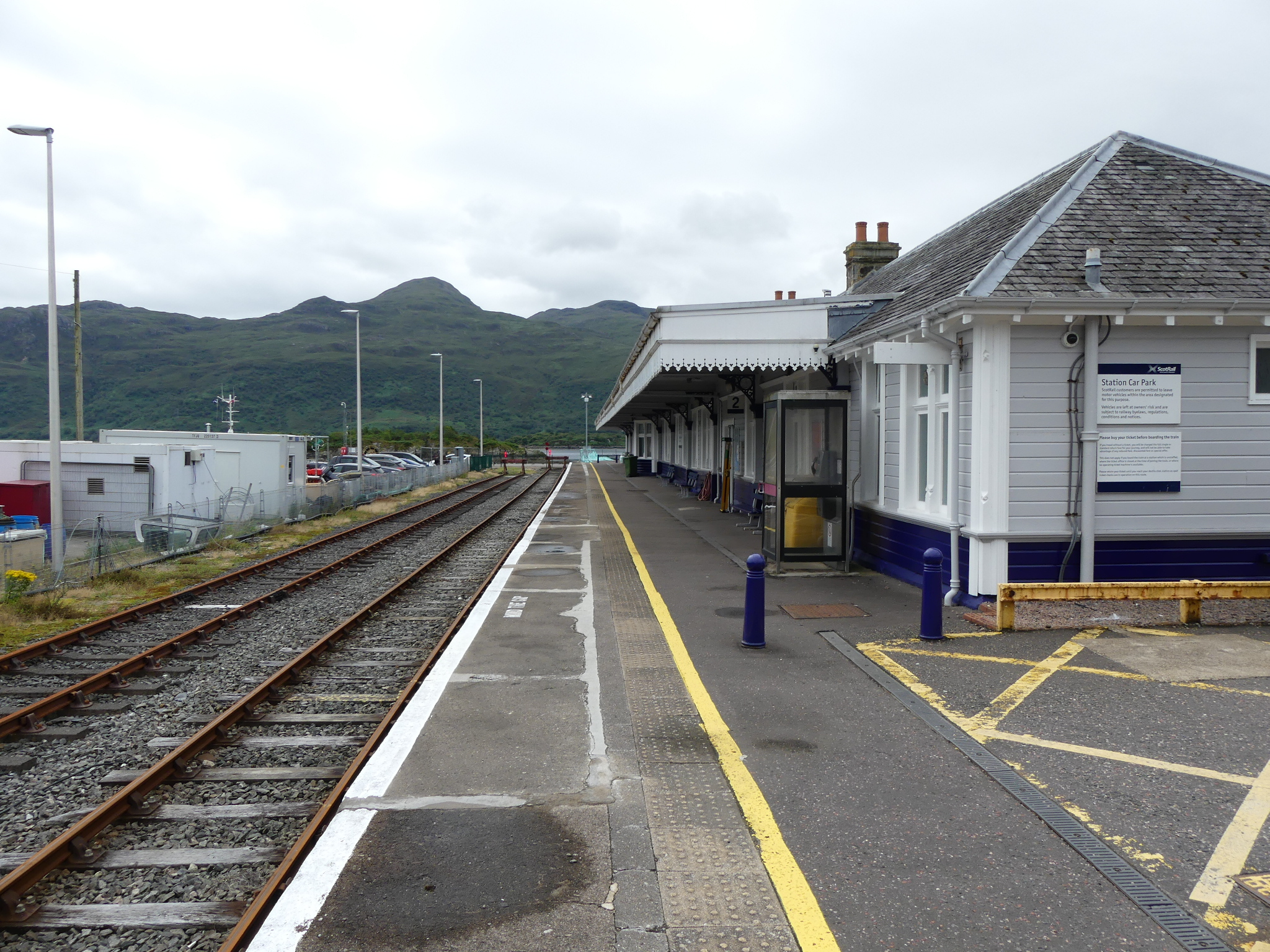
The lesser used platform 2 at the station

The station is well-equipped, with a ticket office, accessible toilets, benches and a telephone. There is a small restaurant/gift shop on the platform. There are car parking places on the access bridge.

== Platform layout ==
The station has two platforms, which can each accommodate a nine-coach train, though only the western face (platform 1) is normally used by passenger trains. Three sidings are also still intact, including a run-round loop for loco-hauled trains alongside platform 1, and a loading bank siding adjacent to this). Access to each of the sidings and platform 2 is by means of ground frames.

== Passenger volume ==
Passenger Volume at Kyle of Lochalsh
	2004–05	2005–06	2006–07	2007–08	2008–09	2009–10	2010–11	2011–12	2012–13	2013–14	2014–15	2015–16	2016–17	2017–18	2018–19	2019–20	2020–21	2021–22	2022–23	2023–24	2024–25
Entries and exits	44,263	44,770	46,749	48,290	52,672	60,164	60,528	66,272	66,828	67,278	64,256	65,706	62,704	65,182	60,606	57,786	7,858	40,702	46,634	53,584	46,788

The statistics cover twelve month periods that start in April.

== Services ==
There are four daily departures from the station to Dingwall and Inverness during the week, and either one (winter) or two (summer) services on Sundays.

Preceding station	National Rail	Following station
Duirinish	ScotRail; Kyle of Lochalsh Line	Terminus
	Historical railways	
Duirinish; Line and station open	Highland Railway; Kyle of Lochalsh Extension	Terminus

== Bibliography ==
- Awdry, Christopher (1990). Encyclopaedia of British Railway Companies. Sparkford: Patrick Stephens Ltd. ISBN 1-8526-0049-7. OCLC 19514063. CN 8983.
- Brailsford, Martyn, ed. (December 2017) [1987]. Railway Track Diagrams 1: Scotland & Isle of Man (6th ed.). Frome: Trackmaps. ISBN 978-0-9549866-9-8.
- Butt, R. V. J. (October 1995). The Directory of Railway Stations: details every public and private passenger station, halt, platform and stopping place, past and present (1st ed.). Sparkford: Patrick Stephens Ltd. ISBN 978-1-85260-508-7. OCLC 60251199. OL 11956311M.
- Jowett, Alan (March 1989). Jowett's Railway Atlas of Great Britain and Ireland: From Pre-Grouping to the Present Day (1st ed.). Sparkford: Patrick Stephens Ltd. ISBN 978-1-85260-086-0. OCLC 22311137.
- Jowett, Alan (2000). Jowett's Nationalised Railway Atlas (1st ed.). Penryn, Cornwall: Atlantic Transport Publishers. ISBN 978-0-906899-99-1. OCLC 228266687.
