= Dingwall and Skye Railway =

Railway in Scotland

Dingwall and Skye Railway (inc Kyle of Lochalsh Extension)

Overview
- Locale: Scotland

History
- Opened: 5 August 1870
- Replaced by Highland Railway: 2 August 1880
- Closed: 2 August 1880

Technical
- Track gauge: 4 ft 8 1/2 in (1,435 mm)

Dingwall and Skye Railway Act 1865
- Act of Parliament
- Parliament of the United Kingdom
- Long title: An Act for making a Railway from Dingwall to Kyle of Lochalsh, to be called "The Dingwall and Skye Railway;" and for other Purposes.
- Citation: 28 & 29 Vict. c. ccxxiii

Dates
- Royal assent: 5 July 1865

Text of statute as originally enacted

Dingwall and Skye Railway (Deviations) Act 1868
- Act of Parliament
- Parliament of the United Kingdom
- Long title: An Act to enable the Dingwall and Skye Railway Company to make Deviations of their authorized Line of Railway; and for other Purposes.
- Citation: 31 & 32 Vict. c. xix

Dates
- Royal assent: 25 June 1868

Text of statute as originally enacted

The Dingwall and Skye Railway was authorised by the Dingwall and Skye Railway Act 1865 (28 & 29 Vict. c. ccxxiii) on 5 July 1865 with the aim of providing a route to Skye and the Hebrides. However, due to local objections, another act of Parliament, the Dingwall and Skye Railway (Deviations) Act 1868 (31 & 32 Vict. c. xix), was required before work could commence. This was passed on 29 May 1868.

With the exception of the Strathpeffer Branch, the line is still open, being the major section of the Kyle of Lochalsh Line.

== History ==
The line to Stromeferry opened for passenger traffic on 19 August 1870. It was 53 miles (85 km) in length and cost £238,500 (equivalent to £24,540,000 in 2025) to build.

Highland and Dingwall and Skye Railways Amalgamation Act 1880
- Act of Parliament
- Parliament of the United Kingdom
- Long title: An Act to amalgamate the Undertakings of the Highland and Dingwall and Skye Railway Companies; and for other purposes.
- Citation: 43 & 44 Vict. c. cxxix

Dates
- Royal assent: 2 August 1880

Text of statute as originally enacted

The line was worked by the Highland Railway, and was ultimately absorbed on 2 August 1880 after the Highland and Dingwall and Skye Railways Amalgamation Act 1880 (43 & 44 Vict. c. cxxix) was passed. On 29 June 1893 the Highland Railway obtained re-authorisation to build the section to Kyle of Lochalsh. The line was inspected by Sir Francis Marindin of the Board of Trade on 29 October 1897, and opened for traffic on 2 November. The construction of the 10 1/2-mile (16.9 km) line cost £200,000 (equivalent to £22,480,000 in 2025) and was built under the supervision of the engineer Murdoch Paterson. The pier at Kyle of Lochalsh cost £85,000 to build.

The initial aim was to connect Skye to Inverness. Although Inverness was Skye's county town at the time, it was easier to get there via Glasgow. The line opened in 1870, but with its terminus at Stromeferry. Boats provided onward connection to Skye and the Outer Hebrides.

The line was extended to Kyle, through some unforgiving terrain; almost all of the extension is in rock cuttings or embankments. At the time it was the most expensive railway ever built in Britain per mile, and much money was provided by the government.

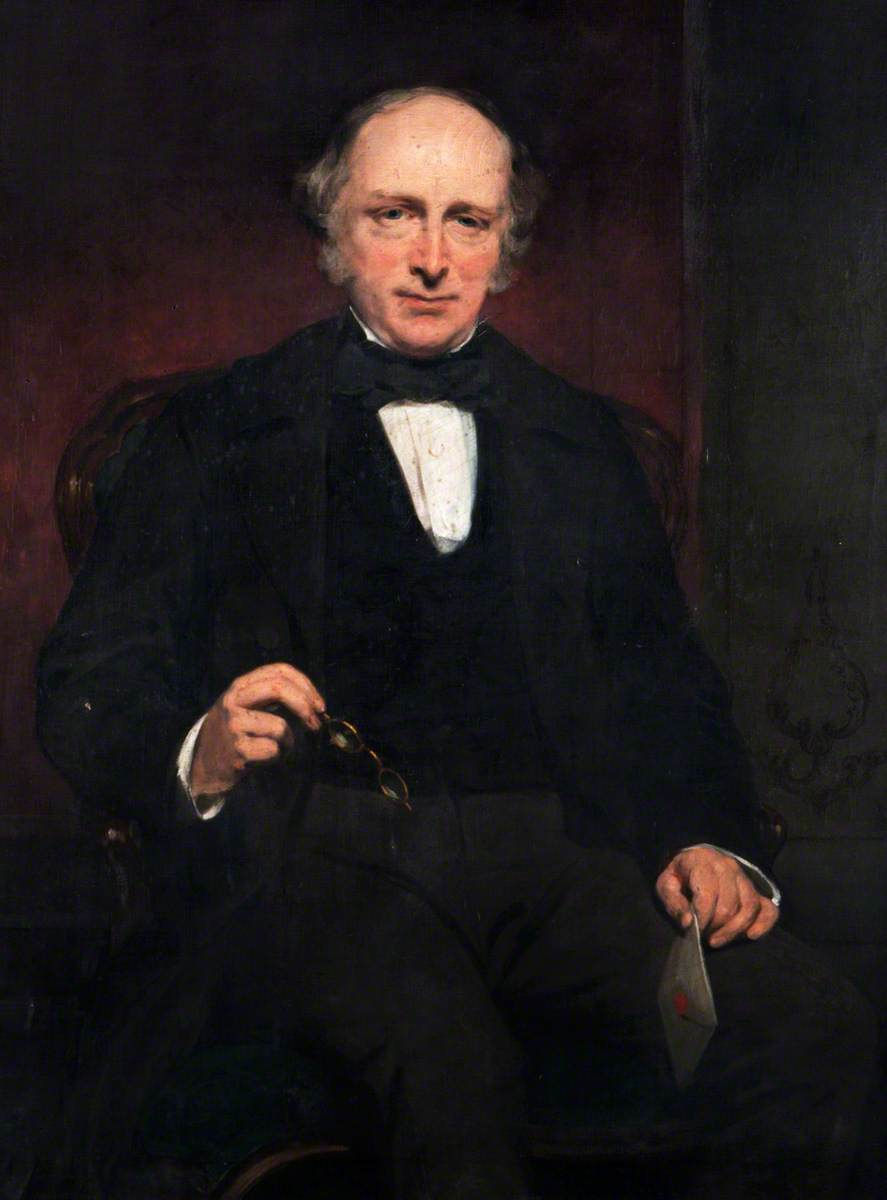
Alexander Matheson, the driving force in getting the line built

The line never gained much traffic: connections with the ferries were often unreliable; much freight traffic was stolen by the West Highland Railway upon its opening. Original ideas, including such ideas as moving fishing boats by rail across Scotland to avoid navigating around, never came to fruition. The line avoided the Beeching Axe due to social necessity, but throughout the 1970s it was variously threatened with closure, but won a reprieve until the Caledonian MacBrayne service to Lewis was moved from Kyle to Ullapool. It was eventually saved in connection with supplying goods for oil platform fabrication at the nearby Kishorn Yard. The section of line along Loch Carron is particularly troublesome, and prone to landslides, often closing that section.

== Strathpeffer Branch ==
The logical route for the original line would have taken it through Strathpeffer, a spa town, and one of the few centres of population, but disagreements with landowners – particularly Sir William Mackenzie of Coul House – meant that it bypassed the town, and the line was diverted through Raven Rock. This diversion consequently proved very costly for the Dingwall & Skye Railway company. The original Dingwall and Skye Railway Act 1865 had allowed the company to build the railway through to Kyle, but the severe costs of the Strathpeffer diversion in addition to loss of revenue from relevant shareholders meant that the money ran out, leading to the line being cut back to Stromeferry, 10 miles (16 km) short of Kyle. It would be another 27 years before the line reached the originally planned terminus.

The short-sightedness of the landowner was to last for a generation, as his son gave permission for the branch line to be built to Strathpeffer by 1884, despite the fact the main line was now already in place. On 3 June 1885, the branch opened, operating for 66 years before it closed on 26 March 1951, with the track being lifted soon afterwards. A station was opened at Achterneed on the original line, being called Strathpeffer, but proved too far from the town to viably harness that revenue, and closed in 1965.

== Connections to other lines ==
- Inverness and Ross-shire Railway at Dingwall
- Garve and Ullapool Railway at Garve (proposed, never built)

== See also ==
History of the Far North of Scotland Railway Line
