= Lochluichart railway station =

Railway station in Highland, Scotland

Lochluichart Scottish Gaelic: Loch Laoicheart
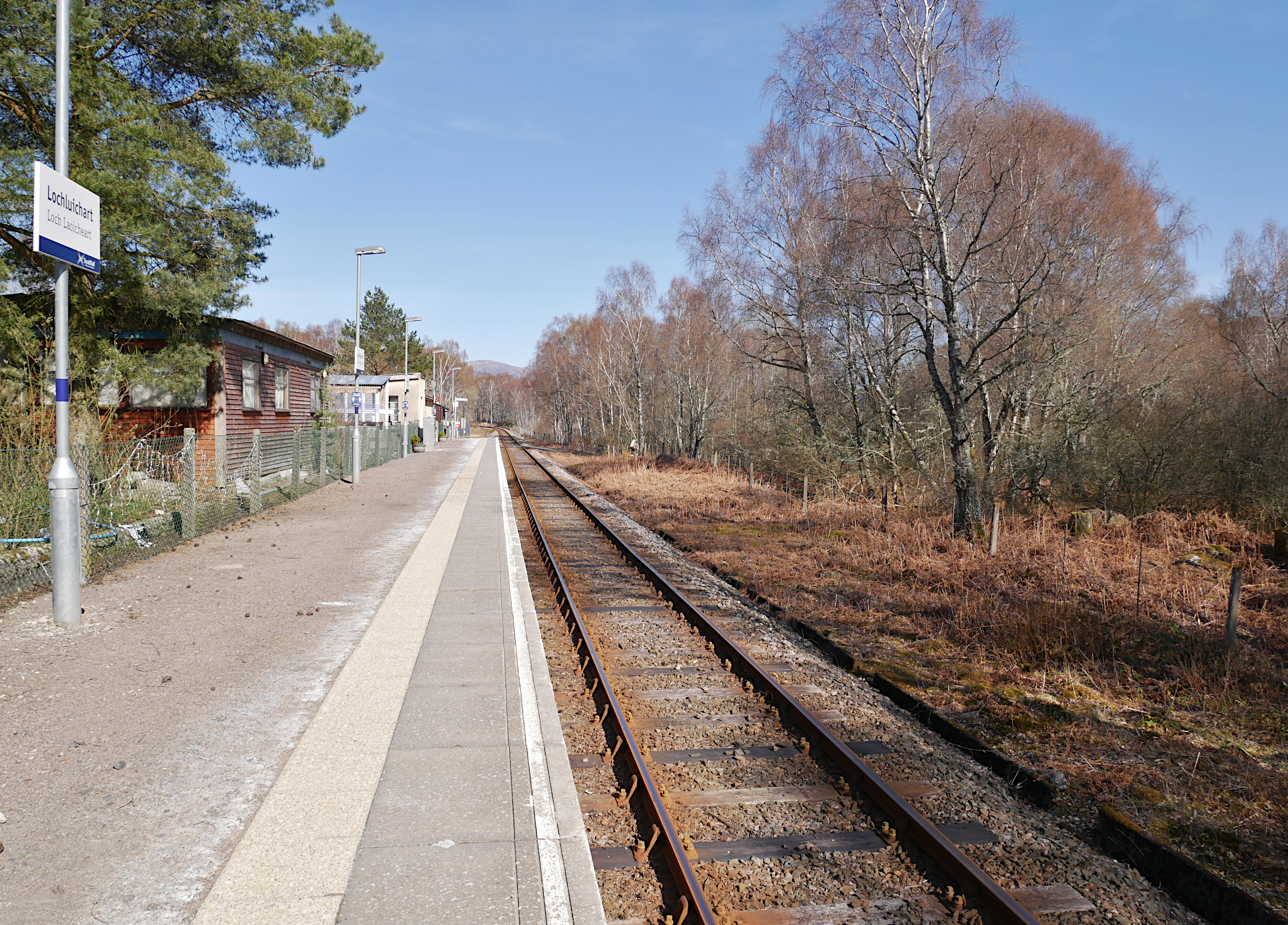

General information
- Location: Lochluichart, Highland; Scotland
- Coordinates: 57.6218°N 4.8091°W
- Grid reference: NH323625
- Manager: ScotRail
- Platforms: 1

Other information
- Station code: LCC

History
- Original company: Dingwall and Skye Railway
- Pre-grouping: Highland Railway
- Post-grouping: London, Midland and Scottish Railway

Key dates
- 1 August 1871: Opened as Lochluichart High
- 3 May 1954: Resited and renamed as Lochluichart

Passengers
- 2021/22: ▲130
- 2022/23: ▲182
- 2023/24: ▲374
- 2024/25: ▲424
- 2025/26: ▲494
Location
Notes
- Passenger statistics from the Office of Rail and Road

Lochluichart railway station is a railway station on the Kyle of Lochalsh Line, serving the village of Lochluichart in the north of Scotland. The station is located at the north edge of Loch Luichart, 17 miles 20 chains (27.8 km) from Dingwall, between Garve and Achanalt. ScotRail, which manages the station, operates all services.

== History ==
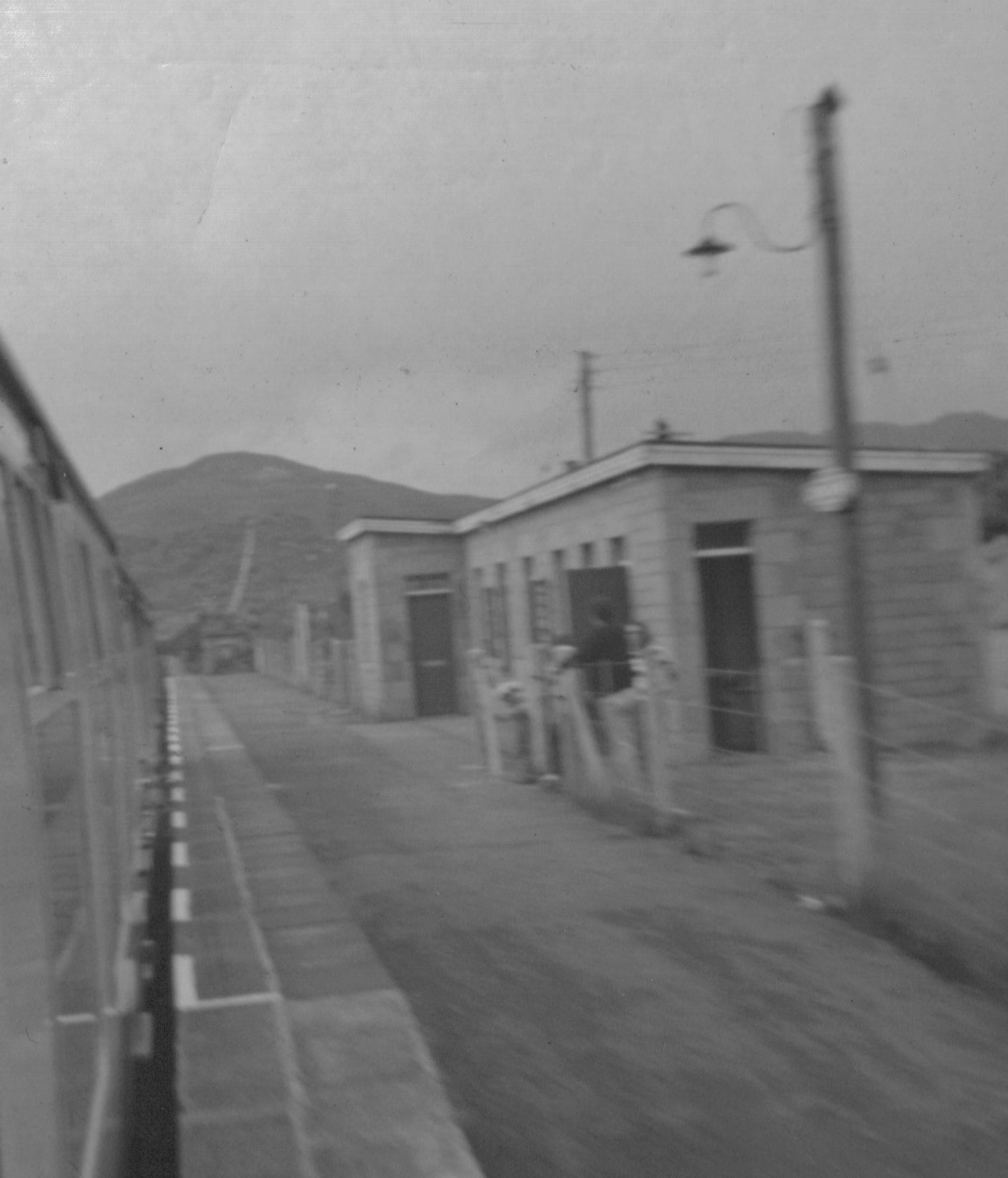
The station seen in 1970

The station was opened as Lochluichart High by the Dingwall and Skye Railway on 1 August 1871 as a private station for Lady Ashburton on the Lochluichart Estate. It became a public station by 1887. Others suggest that it opened as a private station (under the name Lochluichart Lodge) in August 1870, becoming public (and renamed to Lochluichart High) in 1871.

In 1949, Lochluichart was planned to be relocated to allow the flooding of the area by the Glascarnoch-Luichart-Torr Achilty hydroelectric scheme. On 3 May 1954, a new station was opened as Lochluichart as a result of a hydro electric scheme raising the level of Loch Luichart. The deviation required about 2 miles (3.2 km) on stone-pitched embankments and in rock cuttings, a 100-foot (30 m) bridge over the River Conon and a 36-foot (11 m) bridge.

== Facilities ==
Facilities are very basic, comprising just a shelter, a help point and a small car park. The station is step-free. As there are no facilities to purchase tickets, passengers must buy one in advance, or from the guard on the train.

== Passenger volume ==
Passenger Volume at Lochluichart
	2004–05	2005–06	2006–07	2007–08	2008–09	2009–10	2010–11	2011–12	2012–13	2013–14	2014–15	2015–16	2016–17	2017–18	2018–19	2019–20	2020–21	2021–22	2022–23	2023–24	2024–25
Entries and exits	171	306	267	440	218	392	324	442	400	612	482	608	532	632	180	198	24	130	182	374	424

The statistics cover twelve month periods that start in April.

== Services ==
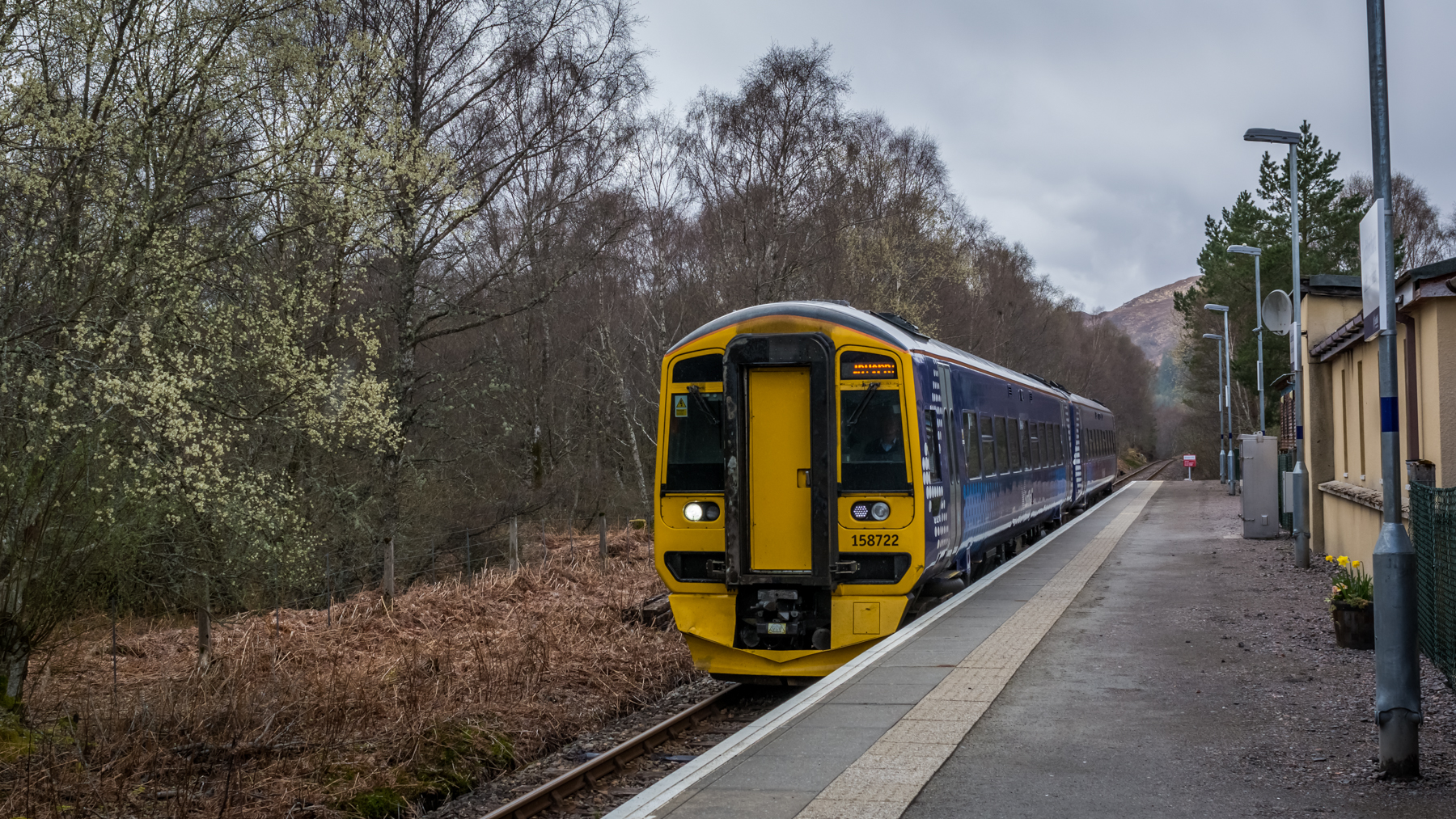
A Class 158 at Lochluichart, bound for Inverness

Four trains each way call (on request) on weekdays/Saturdays and one each way all year on Sundays, plus a second from May to late September only.

Preceding station	National Rail	Following station
Garve	ScotRail; Kyle of Lochalsh Line	Achanalt
	Historical railways	
Garve	Highland Railway; Dingwall and Skye Railway	Achanalt

== Bibliography ==
- Brailsford, Martyn, ed. (December 2017) [1987]. Railway Track Diagrams 1: Scotland & Isle of Man (6th ed.). Frome: Trackmaps. ISBN 978-0-9549866-9-8.
- Butt, R. V. J. (October 1995). The Directory of Railway Stations: details every public and private passenger station, halt, platform and stopping place, past and present (1st ed.). Sparkford: Patrick Stephens Ltd. ISBN 978-1-85260-508-7. OCLC 60251199. OL 11956311M.
- Caton, Peter (2018). Remote Stations. Leicestershire: Matador. ISBN 978-1-78901-408-2.
- Quick, Michael (2022). Railway Passenger Stations in Great Britain: A Chronology (PDF) (5th ed.). London: Railway and Canal Historical Society.
