= Alness railway station =

Railway station in Highland, Scotland

Alness Scottish Gaelic: Alanais
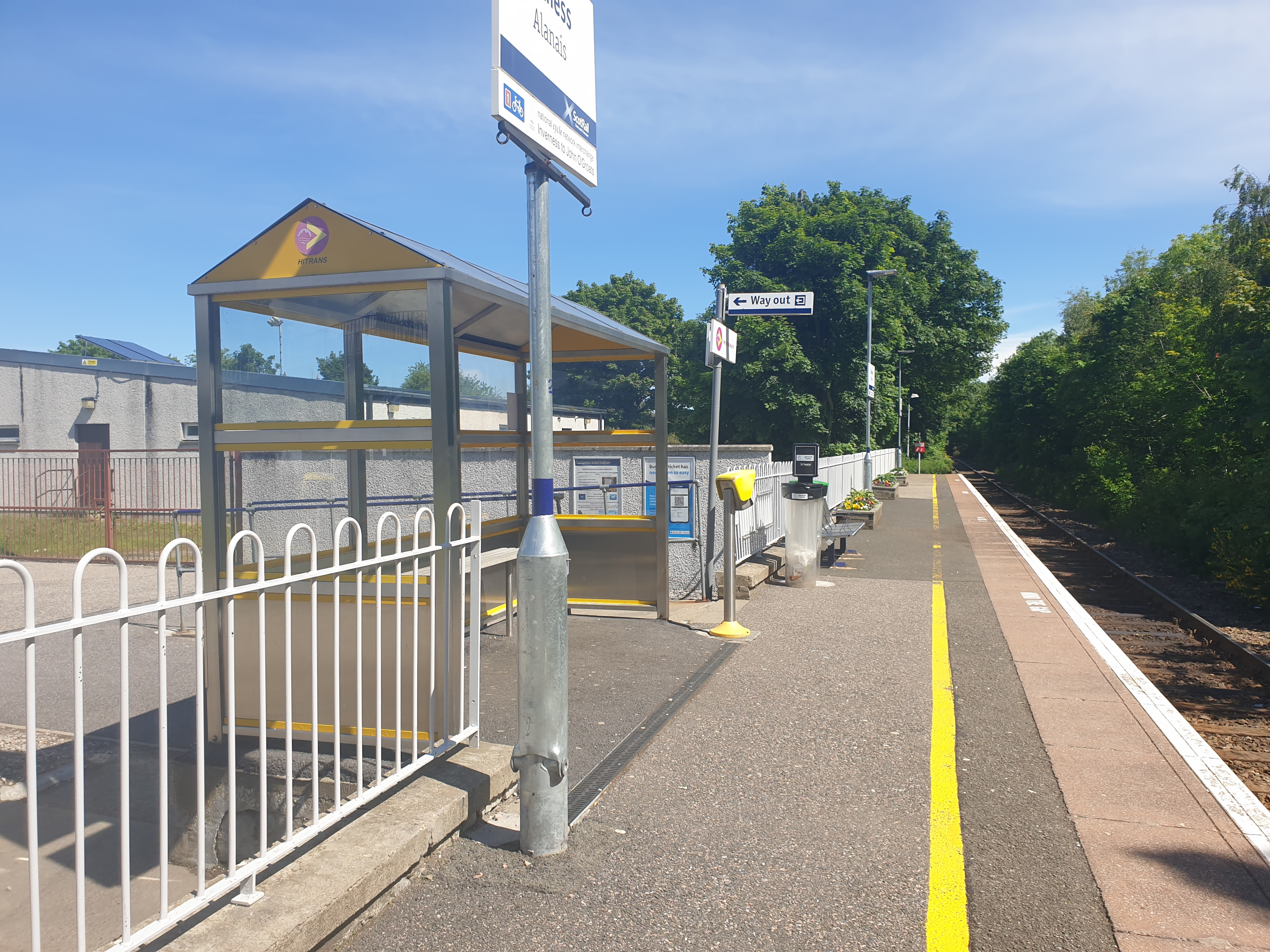

General information
- Location: Alness, Highland; Scotland
- Coordinates: 57.6944°N 4.2497°W
- Grid reference: NH659694
- Manager: ScotRail
- Platforms: 1

Other information
- Station code: ASS

History
- Original company: Inverness and Ross-shire Railway
- Pre-grouping: Highland Railway
- Post-grouping: LMSR

Key dates
- 23 May 1863: Station opened
- 13 June 1960: Station closed
- 7 May 1973: Station reopened

Passengers
- 2021/22: ▲15,810
- 2022/23: ▲16,804
- 2023/24: ▲20,928
- 2024/25: ▼20,482
- 2025/26: ▼20,184
Location
Notes
- Passenger statistics from the Office of Rail and Road

Alness railway station is a railway station on the Far North Line, serving the town of Alness, on the Cromarty Firth, in the Highland council area of Scotland. The station is 28 miles 70 chains (46.5 km) from Inverness, between Dingwall and Invergordon. ScotRail, who manage the station, operate all services.

== History ==
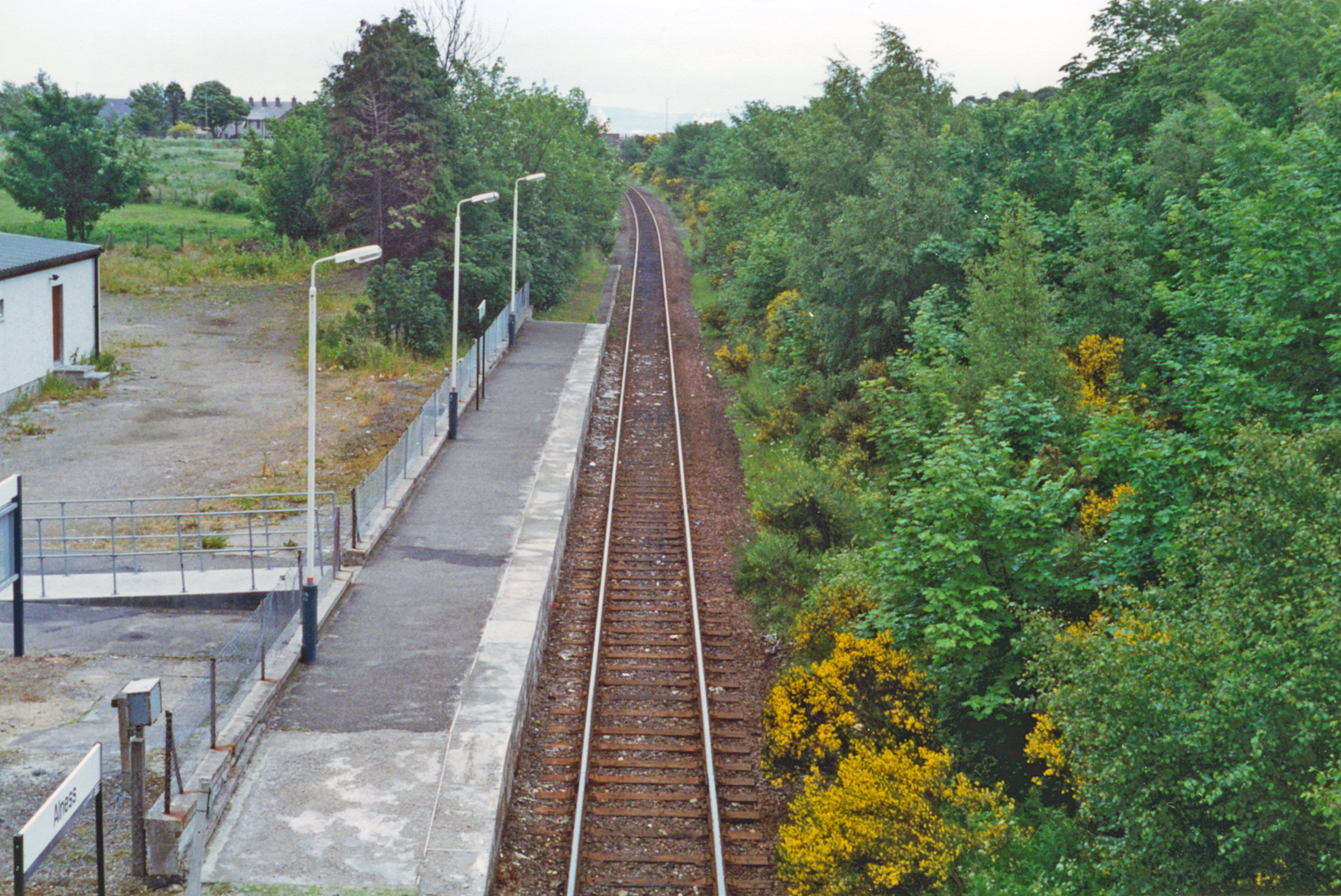
The station seen in 1994

The Inverness and Ross-shire Railway (I&RR), which was to be a line between Inverness and Invergordon, was authorised in 1860, and opened in stages. By the time that the last section, that between Dingwall and Invergordon, opened on 25 March 1863, the I&RR had amalgamated with the Inverness and Aberdeen Junction Railway (I&AJR), the authorisation being given on 30 June 1862. On this last stretch, one of the original stations was that at Alness. The I&AJR in turn amalgamated with other railways to form the Highland Railway in 1865, which became part of the London, Midland and Scottish Railway during the Grouping of 1923. The line then passed on to the Scottish Region of British Railways on nationalisation in 1948. The station at Alness was then closed by the British Transport Commission on 13 June 1960 and remained so for 13 years.

The station reopened on 7 May 1973 after significant housing development in the area. The initial service provision was three trains each way on weekdays and one on Sundays.

=== Accidents and incidents ===
Two people have died after being struck by trains at the station; one man in September 2006, and another person in March 2023.

== Facilities ==
The station consists of one platform on the northern side of the railway, with only a small shelter available. The station also has a small car park, bike racks and a bench. As there are no facilities to purchase tickets, passengers must buy one in advance, or from the guard on the train.

== Passenger volume ==
The main origin or destination station for journeys to or from Alness in the 2022–23 period was Inverness, making up 6,688 of the 16,804 journeys (39.8%).

Passenger Volume at Alness
	2004–05	2005–06	2006–07	2007–08	2008–09	2009–10	2010–11	2011–12	2012–13	2013–14	2014–15	2015–16	2016–17	2017–18	2018–19	2019–20	2020–21	2021–22	2022–23	2023–24	2024–25
Entries and exits	6,950	7,633	9,822	11,550	13,722	14,306	17,782	25,498	28,384	27,796	25,934	23,614	26,376	29,272	30,426	27,050	3,220	15,810	16,804	20,928	20,482

The statistics cover twelve month periods that start in April.

== Services ==
On weekdays and Saturdays, there are 7 trains northbound (4 to Wick via Thurso, 1 to Invergordon, 1 to Ardgay and 1 to Tain) and 8 trains southbound to Inverness. On Sundays, there are five trains southbound to Inverness, and 5 trains northbound (3 to Tain, 1 to Invergordon and 1 through to Wick.

Preceding station	National Rail	Following station
Dingwall	ScotRail; Far North Line	Invergordon
	Historical railways	
Evanton; Line open; station closed	Highland Railway; Inverness and Ross-shire Railway	Invergordon; Line and station open

== Bibliography ==
- Brailsford, Martyn, ed. (December 2017) [1987]. Railway Track Diagrams 1: Scotland & Isle of Man (6th ed.). Frome: Trackmaps. ISBN 978-0-9549866-9-8.
- Butt, R. V. J. (October 1995). The Directory of Railway Stations: details every public and private passenger station, halt, platform and stopping place, past and present (1st ed.). Sparkford: Patrick Stephens Ltd. ISBN 978-1-85260-508-7. OCLC 60251199. OL 11956311M.
- Vallance, H.A.; Clinker, C.R.; Lambert, Anthony J. (1985) [1938]. The Highland Railway (4th ed.). Newton Abbot: David & Charles. ISBN 0-946537-24-0.
