= Fearn railway station =

Railway station in the Highlands of Scotland

Fearn Scottish Gaelic: Manachainn Rois
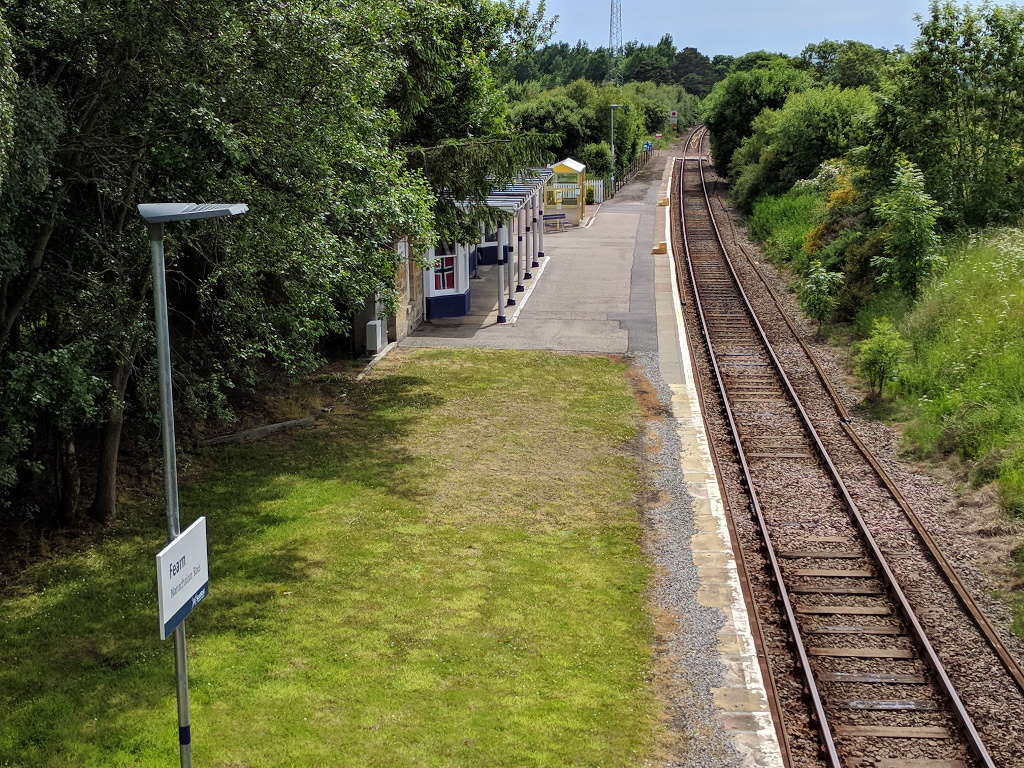
- Fearn in 2018, looking south

General information
- Location: Hill of Fearn, Highland; Scotland
- Coordinates: 57.7780°N 3.9940°W
- Grid reference: NH815782
- Manager: ScotRail
- Platforms: 1

Other information
- Station code: FRN

History
- Original company: Inverness and Ross-shire Railway
- Pre-grouping: Highland Railway
- Post-grouping: LMSR

Key dates
- 1 June 1864: Opened

Passengers
- 2021/22: ▲2,980
- 2022/23: ▲3,754
- 2023/24: ▲4,062
- 2024/25: ▼3,780
- 2025/26: ▼3,052

Listed Building – Category B
- Designated: 6 October 1978
- Reference no.: LB7782
Location
Notes
- Passenger statistics from the Office of Rail and Road

Fearn railway station is a railway station serving the village of Hill of Fearn in the Highland council area of Scotland, located around 1.3 miles (2.1 km) from the village. It is situated on the Far North Line, 40 miles 60 chains (65.6 km) form Inverness, between Tain and Invergordon, and is also the nearest station to Balintore, Hilton and Shandwick (the Seaboard Villages), Portmahomack and the Nigg Bay area of Easter Ross. ScotRail, who manage the station, operate all services.

== History ==
The station opened on 1 June 1864, as part of the Inverness and Ross-shire Railway, later the Highland Railway and then the London, Midland and Scottish Railway.

== Facilities ==
As well as a small car park, there are bike racks, a bench, a waiting shelter and a help point. The station has step free access. As there are no facilities to purchase tickets, passengers must buy one in advance, or from the guard on the train.

== Platform layout ==
The railway through Fearn station is single track, the nearest passing loops being at Invergordon to the south and Tain to the west. The station has a single platform which is long enough for a seven-coach train.

== Passenger volume ==
Passenger Volume at Fearn
| | 2004–05 | 2005–06 | 2006–07 | 2007–08 | 2008–09 | 2009–10 | 2010–11 | 2011–12 | 2012–13 | 2013–14 | 2014–15 | 2015–16 | 2016–17 | 2017–18 | 2018–19 | 2019–20 | 2020–21 | 2021–22 | 2022–23 | 2023–24 | 2024–25 |
|---|---|---|---|---|---|---|---|---|---|---|---|---|---|---|---|---|---|---|---|---|---|
| Entries and exits | 5,157 | 5,143 | 6,069 | 5,581 | 7,724 | 6,790 | 6,720 | 7,818 | 7,226 | 6,606 | 6,130 | 5,396 | 5,262 | 5,256 | 4,304 | 4,182 | 850 | 2,980 | 3,754 | 4,062 | 3,780 |

The statistics cover twelve month periods that start in April.

== Services ==
As of the May 2026 timetable, on weekdays and Saturdays, the stations sees 6 trains northbound (4 to Wick via Thurso, 1 to Tain, and 1 to Ardgay), and 7 trains southbound to Inverness. On Sundays, the station sees 4 trains northbound (1 to Wick via Thurso, 3 to Tain) and 4 trains to Inverness.

| Preceding station | National Rail | Following station |
|---|---|---|
| Invergordon | ScotRail; Far North Line | Tain |
| | Historical railways | |
| Nigg; Line open; Station closed | Highland Railway; Inverness and Ross-shire Railway | Tain; Line and station open |

== Bibliography ==
- Brailsford, Martyn, ed. (December 2017) [1987]. Railway Track Diagrams 1: Scotland & Isle of Man (6th ed.). Frome: Trackmaps. ISBN 978-0-9549866-9-8.
- Butt, R. V. J. (October 1995). The Directory of Railway Stations: details every public and private passenger station, halt, platform and stopping place, past and present (1st ed.). Sparkford: Patrick Stephens Ltd. ISBN 978-1-85260-508-7. OCLC 60251199. OL 11956311M.
- Jowett, Alan (March 1989). Jowett's Railway Atlas of Great Britain and Ireland: From Pre-Grouping to the Present Day (1st ed.). Sparkford: Patrick Stephens Ltd. ISBN 978-1-85260-086-0. OCLC 22311137.
