= Garve railway station =

Railway station in Highland, Scotland

Garve Scottish Gaelic: Gairbh
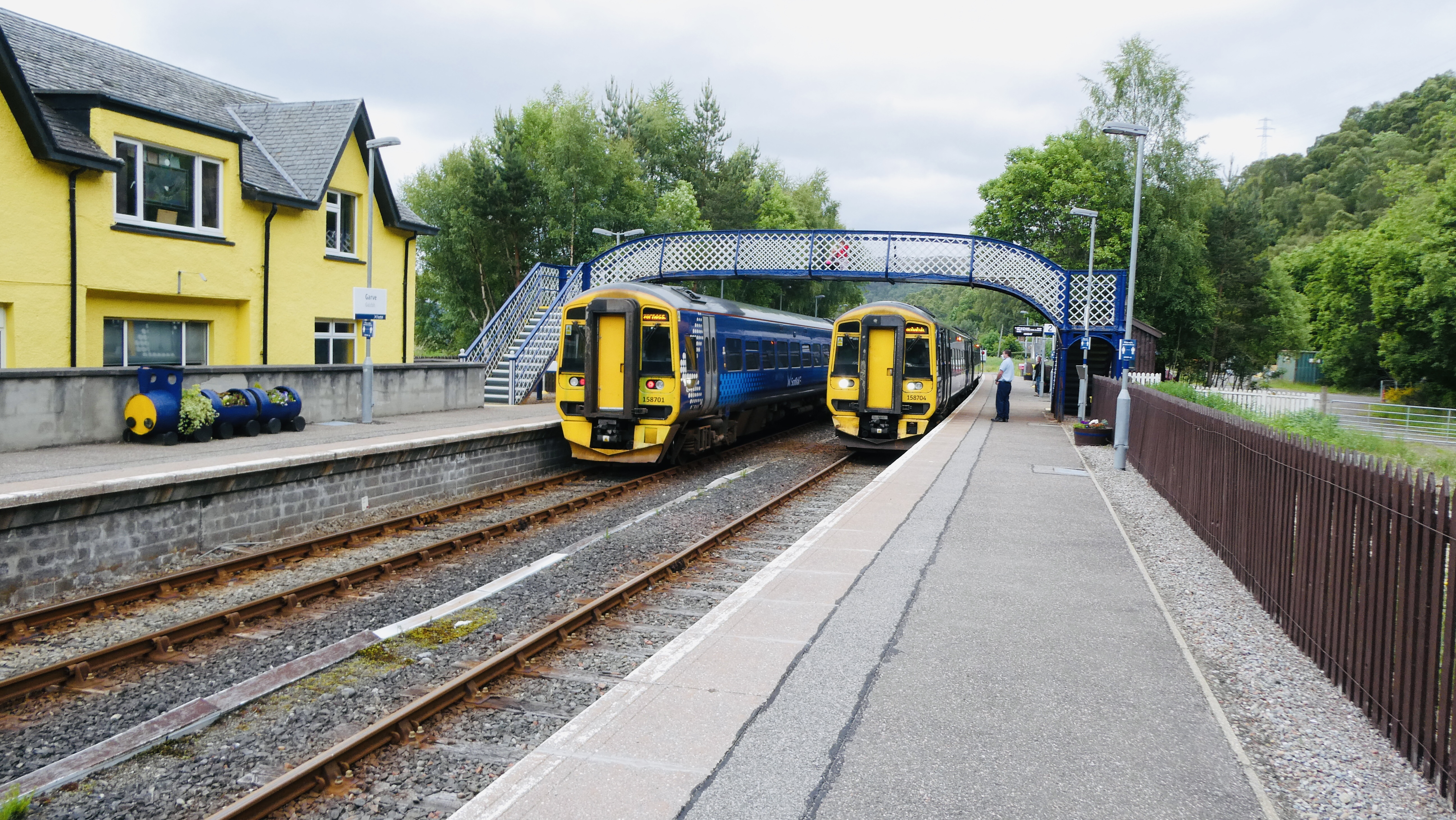
- 158701 and 158704 stand at Garve, looking east

General information
- Location: Garve, Highland; Scotland
- Coordinates: 57.6130°N 4.6883°W
- Grid reference: NH395613
- Manager: ScotRail
- Platforms: 2

Other information
- Station code: GVE

History
- Original company: Dingwall and Skye Railway
- Pre-grouping: Highland Railway
- Post-grouping: LMS

Key dates
- 19 August 1870: Opened

Passengers
- 2021/22: ▲2,560
- 2022/23: ▲3,290
- 2023/24: ▲4,264
- 2024/25: ▼3,964
- 2025/26: ▲4,054
Location
Notes
- Passenger statistics from the Office of Rail and Road

Garve railway station is a railway station on the Kyle of Lochalsh Line, serving the village of Garve in the north of Scotland. Garve is located at the eastern edge of Loch Garve, measured 11 miles 65 chains (19.0 km) from Dingwall, and is the first stop on the line before Lochluichart. ScotRail, who manage the station, operate all services.

== History ==
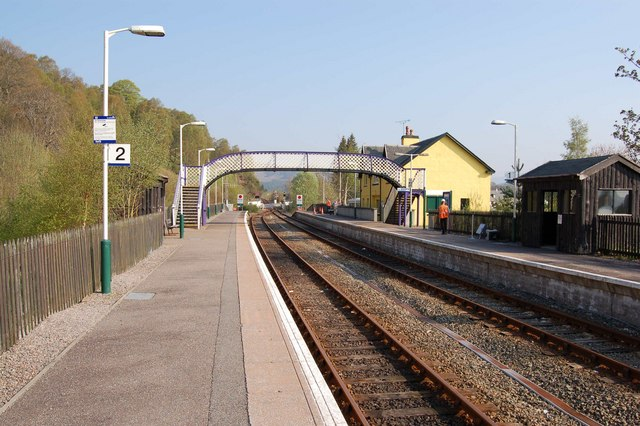
The platforms, looking west

The station was opened on 19 August 1870. It was to be the junction for the Garve and Ullapool Railway, intended to connect Ullapool, the Western Isles' nearest mainland port, with the rest of the UK. An act of parliament was passed for the line in 1890, but in spite of local efforts in that year, and again two years later, the idea could not be fully financed and was abandoned.

== Facilities ==
Facilities here are basic, comprising shelters and benches, and a small car park (as well as bike racks). There is step-free access to both platforms, but not between them (as only a footbridge connects them).

== Platform layout ==
The station is 11 miles 65 chains (19.0 km) from Dingwall, and has a passing loop 20 chains (400 m) long, flanked by two platforms which can each accommodate a five-coach train.

== Passenger volume ==
Passenger Volume at Garve
	2004–05	2005–06	2006–07	2007–08	2008–09	2009–10	2010–11	2011–12	2012–13	2013–14	2014–15	2015–16	2016–17	2017–18	2018–19	2019–20	2020–21	2021–22	2022–23	2023–24	2024–25
Entries and exits	7,092	9,471	9,690	9,847	8,546	6,898	5,814	5,038	5,384	5,028	5,076	4,676	3,668	4,302	3,212	3,480	426	2,560	3,290	4,264	3,964

The statistics cover twelve month periods that start in April.

== Services ==
From Monday to Saturday, there are four daily services to Kyle of Lochalsh and four daily services in the opposite direction to Inverness. There is one service in each direction on Sundays all year, with a second during the summer months only.

Preceding station	National Rail	Following station
Dingwall	ScotRail; Kyle of Lochalsh Line	Lochluichart
	Historical railways	
Achterneed	Highland Railway; Dingwall and Skye Railway	Lochluichart

== Bibliography ==
- Brailsford, Martyn, ed. (December 2017) [1987]. Railway Track Diagrams 1: Scotland & Isle of Man (6th ed.). Frome: Trackmaps. ISBN 978-0-9549866-9-8.
- Butt, R. V. J. (October 1995). The Directory of Railway Stations: details every public and private passenger station, halt, platform and stopping place, past and present (1st ed.). Sparkford: Patrick Stephens Ltd. ISBN 978-1-85260-508-7. OCLC 60251199. OL 11956311M.
- Jowett, Alan (2000). Jowett's Nationalised Railway Atlas (1st ed.). Penryn, Cornwall: Atlantic Transport Publishers. ISBN 978-0-906899-99-1. OCLC 228266687.
- Jowett, Alan (March 1989). Jowett's Railway Atlas of Great Britain and Ireland: From Pre-Grouping to the Present Day (1st ed.). Sparkford: Patrick Stephens Ltd. ISBN 978-1-85260-086-0. OCLC 22311137.
