= Hill of Fearn =

Coordinates: 57.7749°N 3.9647°W

Hill of Fearn: Scottish Gaelic: Baile an Droma
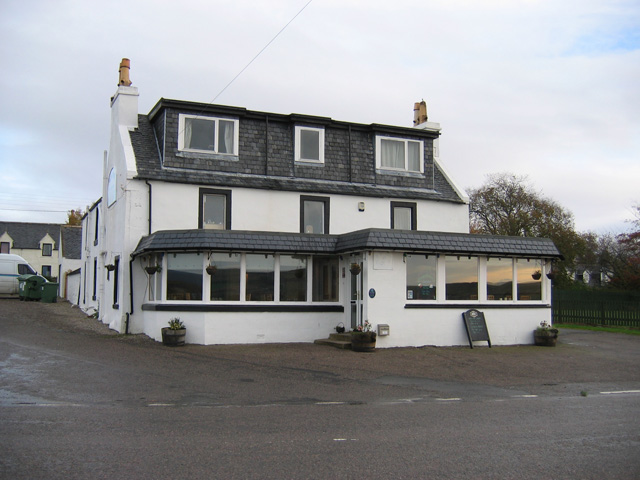

- Location within the Ross and Cromarty area
- OS grid reference: NH832778
- Council area: Highland
- Country: Scotland
- Sovereign state: United Kingdom
- Post town: Tain
- Postcode district: IV20 1
- Police: Scotland
- Fire: Scottish
- Ambulance: Scottish

Hill of Fearn (Scottish Gaelic: Baile an Droma) is a small village near Tain in Easter Ross, in the Scottish council area of Highland.

== Geography ==
The village is on the B9165 road, between the A9 trunk road and the smaller hamlet of Fearn to the southeast.

The former RNAS Fearn (HMS Owl) is to the south of the village.

== Village ==
Hill of Fearn has a post office which doubles as the village shop and butchers, a primary school and a bus stop. Fearn railway station, located on the Far North Line, is around 1.3 miles (2.1 km) from the village.

The "N" on the sign into the village is often removed, giving the village the more sinister title of "Hill of Fear" - despite the best efforts of Highland Council to replace the N, or the entire sign itself, on a number of occasions.

Care should be taken to distinguish between the village of Hill of Fearn and the parish of Fearn; the latter also contains the villages of Hilton and Balintore, 2 miles (3 km) distant from Hill of Fearn, as well as the hamlet of Fearn, 1/4 mile (400 m) away from Hill of Fearn. The name Fearn, according to Watson's "Place Names of Ross & Cromarty", derives from the Scottish Gaelic Feàrna (an alder tree).

== Famous residents ==
Hill of Fearn was the birthplace (28 August 1884) of New Zealand Prime Minister Peter Fraser (1 April 1940 to 13 December 1949). Tarbat Discovery Centre, located 7 miles (11 km) away in Portmahomack, has an archive relating to Peter Fraser (not on display, but may be consulted on request).

Hill of Fearn was also the birthplace (14 May 1948) of churchman John MacLeod.

The author Eric Linklater (1899–1974), when he was owner of nearby Pitcalzean House, Nigg in the 1940s and 1950s bought his clothes from the village tailor, Norman Smart.

== See also ==
- Fearn railway station
