= Strathpeffer railway station =

Former railway station in Scotland

Coordinates: 57.5901°N 4.5346°W

Strathpeffer
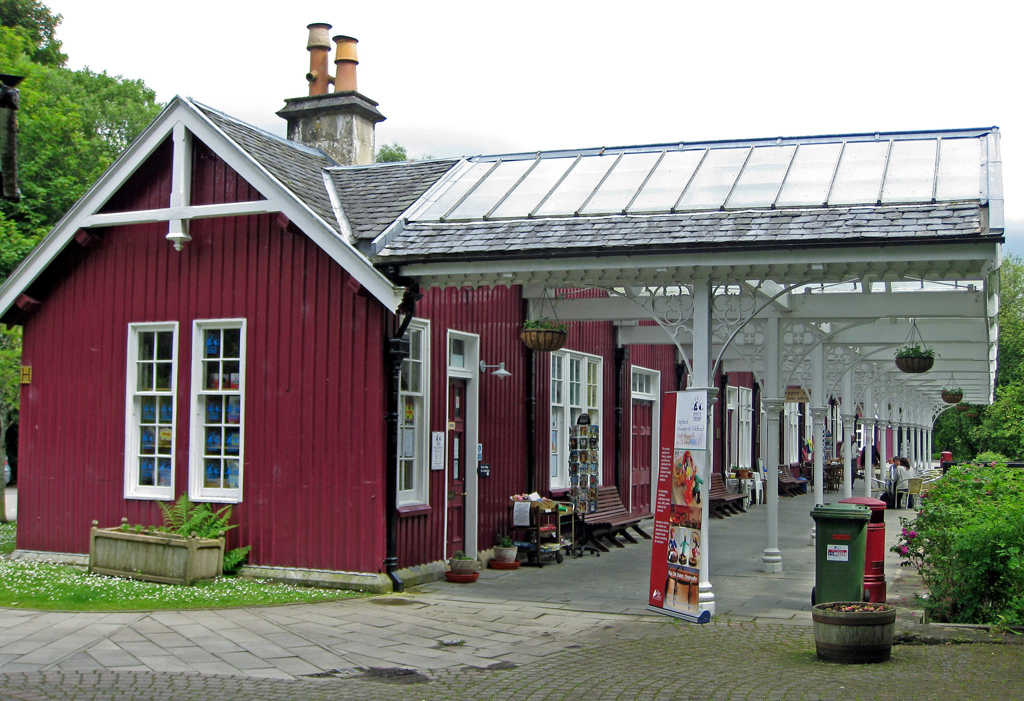
- The station in 2011, viewed from the west end, when in use as an information office, cafe and retail shops. The railway line lay behind the bushes at right.

General information
- Location: Strathpeffer, Strathpeffer; Scotland
- Platforms: 1

Other information
- Status: Disused

History
- Original company: Highland Railway
- Pre-grouping: Highland Railway
- Post-grouping: London Midland and Scottish Railway

Key dates
- 3 June 1885: station opens
- 23 February 1946: station closes for passengers
- 26 March 1951: closes for goods
Location

Strathpeffer railway station was a railway station serving the town of Strathpeffer in the county of Ross and Cromarty, (later Highland Region), Scotland. The first station was located some distance from the town, on the Dingwall and Skye Railway line, and was opened in 1870.

Seasonal visitors to Strathpeffer increased considerably in numbers, and a branch line to Strathpeffer itself was opened in 1885; the earlier station was renamed Achterneed. Tourism increased considerably, but the First World War interrupted the leisure development, and it never recovered after the war.

In 1946 the second Strathpeffer station was closed to passengers. The earlier station continued in use for a time, being located on a through line, but it closed in 1964.

== First station ==
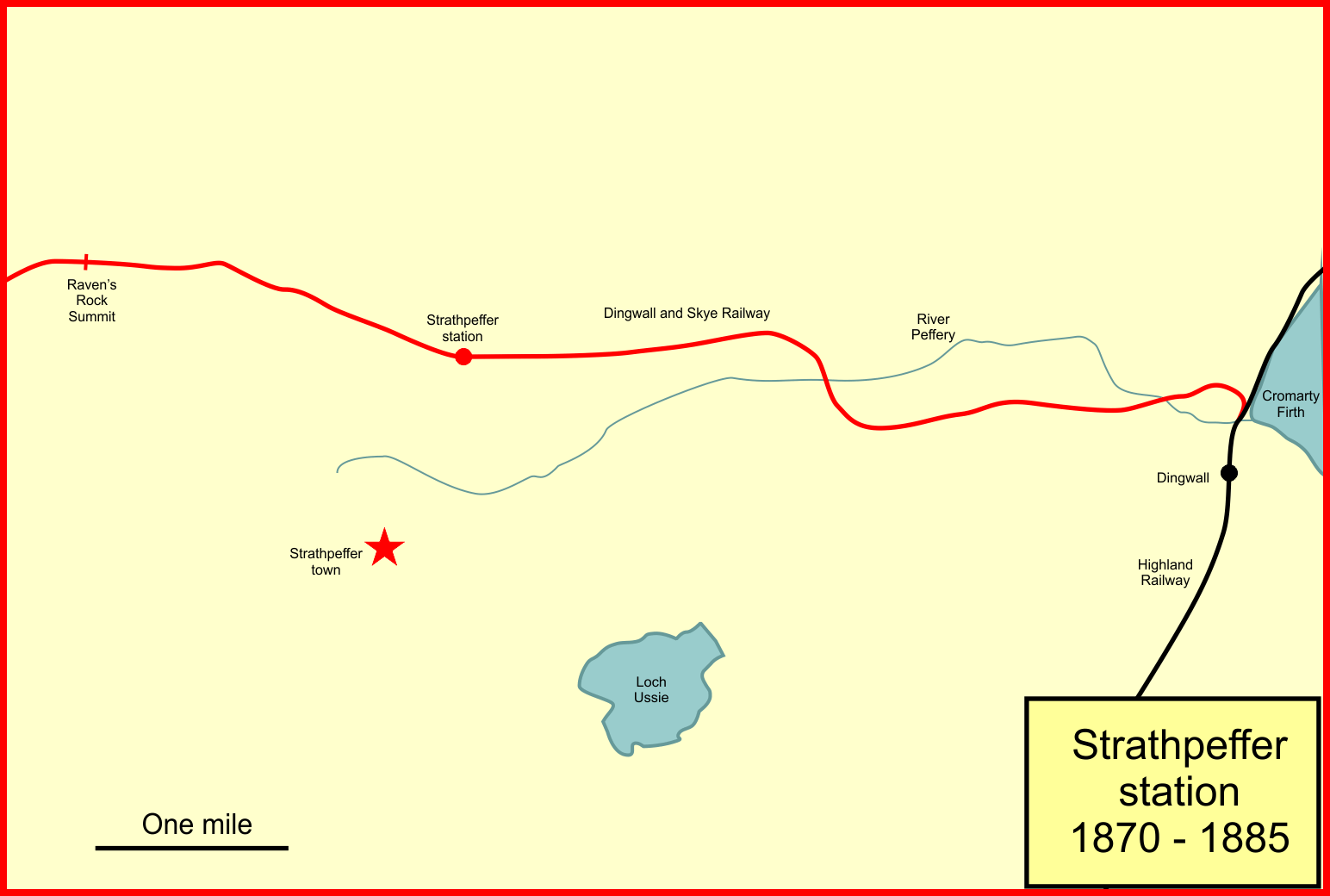
Strathpeffer station from 1870

On 5 July 1865 the Dingwall and Skye Railway was authorised by an Act of Parliament; it was an ambitious scheme to build westwards from Dingwall on the Inverness and Ross-shire Railway to Kyle of Lochalsh on the west coast opposite the Isle of Skye.

The part of the route at the eastern end was planned to follow relatively easy terrain, passing through Strathpeffer to Contin, then turning north through the valley of the Black Water to pass Loch Garve.

Sir William MacKenzie of Coul House had opposed the railway on the grounds of loss of privacy at his residence, but Parliament had not upheld his objections. He was implacably opposed to the construction of the railway nearby, and demanded that the line should be built in tunnel throughout the crossing of his lands, an arrangement that the promoters of the line thought impracticable and unaffordable. MacKenzie continued his opposition in such a way that construction could not proceed, and at length the Dingwall and Skye company obtained a second Act, on 5 July 1865, (Note: Date from Ross; Vallance et al say 29 May 1868.) authorising an alternative route. As the proposed line approached Strathpeffer it turned sharply northwards, at the location that later became Fodderty Junction, climbing at 1 in 50 to a local summit at the Raven's Rock (458 feet), there continuing west to meet the originally intended route. These arrangements increased the cost of construction of the line, and made operation more difficult.

Strathpeffer was the largest community on the line of route, with a population of 2,247 in 1861. Notwithstanding the deviation, it was given a station, although this was about two miles north of the town at the top of a steep hill. The line opened to goods traffic on 5 August 1870 and to passengers on 19 August 1870, and this Strathpeffer station opened at the same time. The line was worked by the Highland Railway. Sir William MacKenzie died before the line opened, and his heir was friendly towards railways.

When the second "Strathpeffer" station opened, this first station was renamed Achterneed.

It closed on 7 December 1964, outliving the second Strathpeffer station.

Achterneed station is said to have re-opened as a private unstaffed halt on 8 February 1965, and closed again in 1968.

== Second station ==
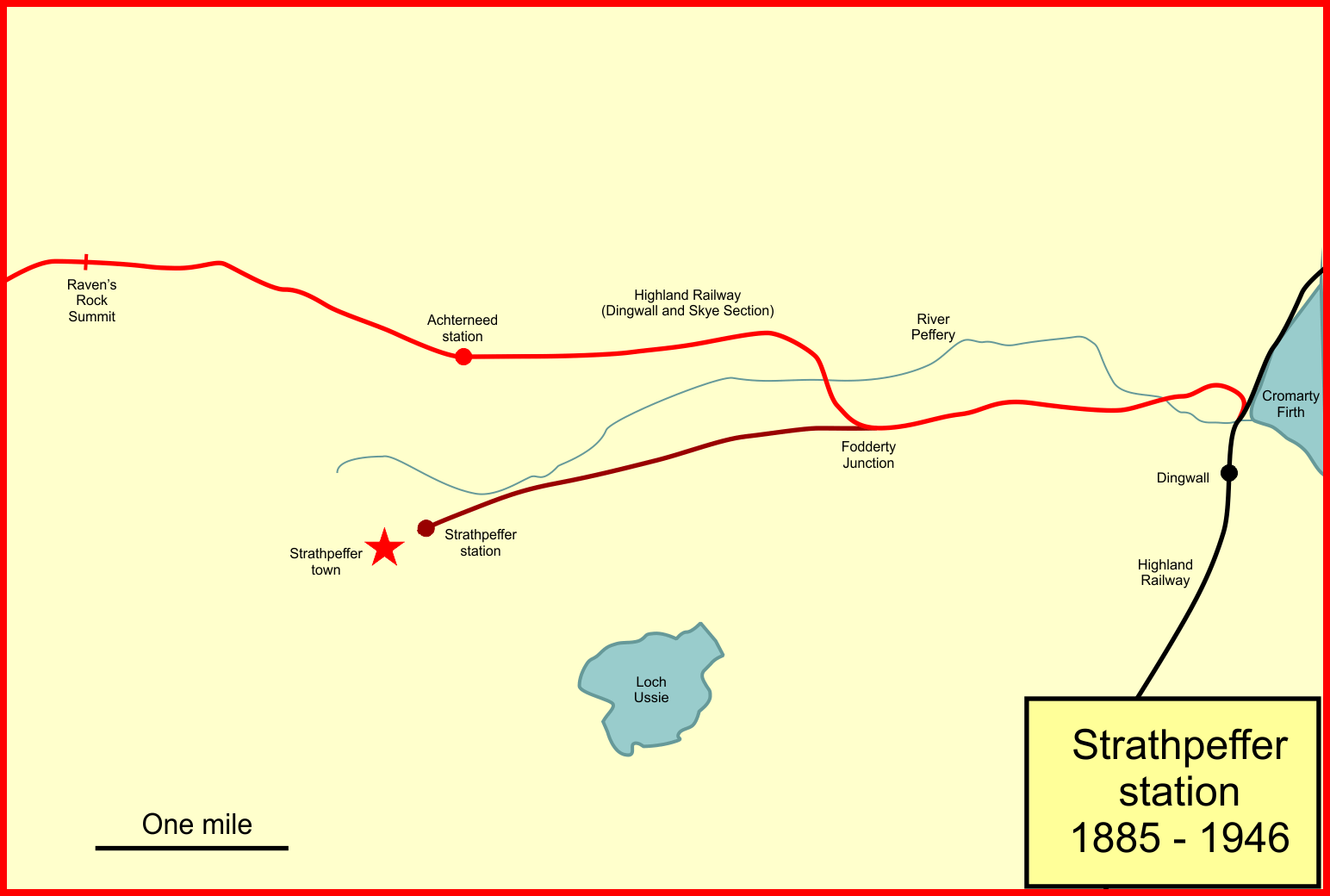
The second station at Strathpeffer from 1885

Strathpeffer had numerous chalybeate mineral water springs, as well as the strongest sulphur springs in the country; these were considered to be an important health aid, and the spa facilities developed in connection with taking the waters attracted considerable numbers of visitors. The inconvenient location of the station was a considerable disadvantage, and the Highland Railway were approached to build a line to the town itself.

They agreed to do this, and obtained Parliamentary authority in a New Lines Act of 28 July 1884,; they constructed a branch line from Fodderty, where a junction was made with the Skye line, continuing west to the margin of Strathpeffer along the route originally intended for that part of the Dingwall and Skye line. The branch opened on 3 June 1885; it was a single line. The earlier Strathpeffer station remained open, but was renamed Achterneed. (Note: Higginson says that the first station was renamed to Achterneed two days before the opening of the new station.) A 2-2-2 locomotive dating from 1865 was allocated to work the branch; it was given a second-hand boiler to replace its own. It was formerly named Breadalbane it was renamed Strathpeffer. For the remainder of the nineteenth century the passenger rolling stock was ancient Highland Railway four-wheelers.

The new Stathpeffer station was elaborately designed. Higginson describes it:

A gabled canopy, supported on cast iron columns, extended its full length while inside extensive offices and waiting rooms were to be found. A bow fronted gable, embellished with intricate bargeboards, served to relieve the otherwise plain frontage which faced onto a wide and sweeping approach.

A standard goods shed was provided, and there was a stone house for the station master. A new bay platform for the Strathpeffer trains was provided at Dingwall.

=== Stationmasters ===
- William Robertson from 1885
- Mr. Cameron until 1893 (afterwards chief traffic manager of the Algecires and Gibraltar Railway)
- James Baxter 1894 - 1900 (formerly station master at Strome Ferry)
- Alexander MacDonald 1900 - 1903 (afterwards station master at Fochabers)
- Donald Fraser 1903 - 1914
- John Campbell 1914 - (afterwards station master at Aviemore)
- William P. Hutton 1922 - 1932 (afterwards station master at Lairg)
- J. Graham 1932 - 1937
- Duncan Stewart from1937 (formerly station master at Forsinard)

== The twentieth century ==
The Highland Railway belatedly set about building its own hotel in the town, but that did not open until 1911. Strathpeffer experienced a remarkable increase in seasonal visitors, and with the Highland Railway hotel there were more than 500 hotel bedrooms in the town, more than anywhere else on the Highland Railway system except Inverness and Pitlochry. The town was named The Harrogate of the North by the Weekly Scotsman newspaper.

In 1908 - 1909 a through sleeping carriage service from London to Strathpeffer had been run, going forward from Inverness on the 9:50 am Wick train, which detached a portion for Strathpeffer at Dingwall.

With the opening of the Highland Railway hotel, the Company started running a Tuesdays-only train in summer, the Strathpeffer Spa Express. It ran northbound only, from Aviemore and stopped only at Dingwall, using the Rose Street spur at Inverness to avoid the station there. This train ran from 1911 until it was suspended during World War I in 1915. It left Aviemore at 2:15 pm, connecting out of a Perth to Inverness via Forres express train, and it arrived in Strathpeffer at 4:15 pm.

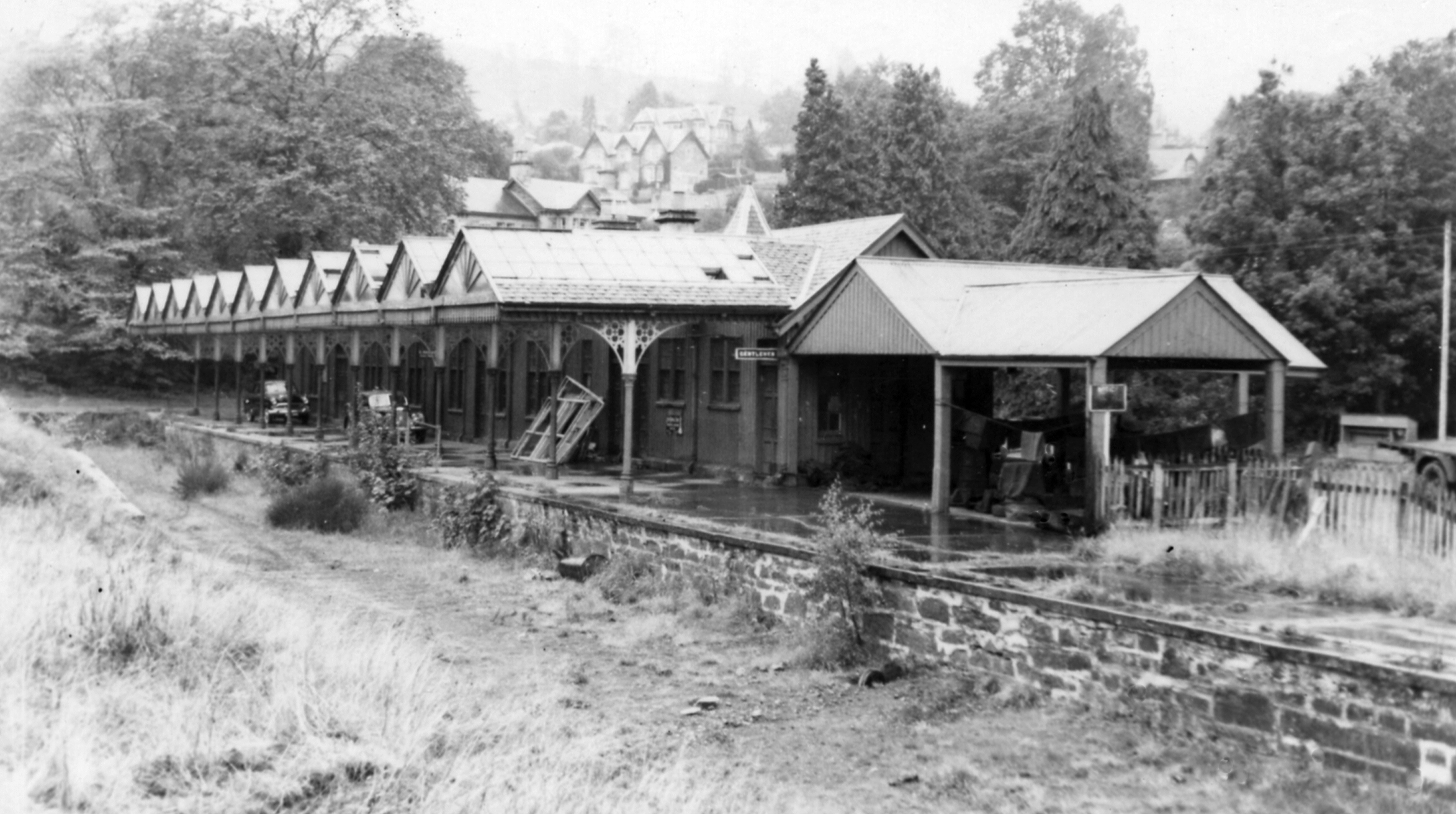
Remains of station 1956.

After the Armistice in 1918, the town never resumed its former importance as a tourist centre, and the passenger train service treated the line as a simple branch line.

With the development of reliable road transport, the usage of the passenger service declined steeply in the 1930s, and on 26 March 1946 (Note: Ross says 2 March 1946 on page 88, but this must be a mistake.) the passenger service was withdrawn. A limited goods service continued, but that too succumbed to road competition, and the branch closed completely on 26 March 1951. although closure was not made official until 12 August 1951.

== Train services ==
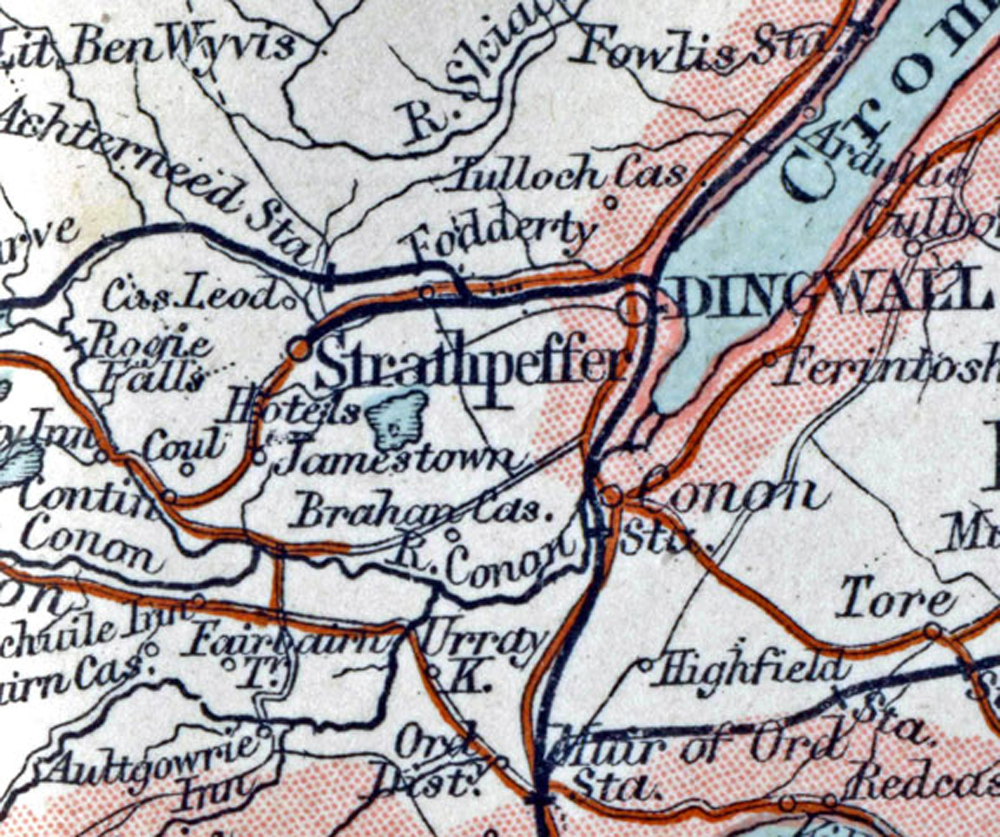
1899 map showing the line to Strathpeffer from Fodderty Junction, and Achterneed station

The passenger train service to Strathpeffer was designed to connect at Dingwall with trains between Inverness and the far north, and Kyle of Lochalsh.

In December 1895, there were seven passenger trains each way over the five-mile long route from Dingwall. The journey time was ten minutes, with no intermediate stops. The first train reached Strathpeffer at 7.50 a.m. and the last at 5.42 p.m. The first departure for Dingwall was at 8.40 a.m. and the last at 8.10 p.m.

In July 1922, six passenger trains were operated each way. The first train left Dingwall for Strathpeffer at 8.20 a.m. and the last at 6.15 p.m. In the other direction, the first train left Strathpeffer for Dingwall at 9.00 a.m. and the last at 6.35 p.m.

The Highland Railway was a constituent of the London Midland and Scottish Railway (LMSR) from 1 January 1923, under the Railways Act 1921. The frequency of the branch line passenger train service was reduced by the LMSR during World War II, and in October 1942 four trains were operated in each direction. The first Strathpeffer train left Dingwall at 7.53 a.m. and the last at 4.00 p.m. The first train to Dingwall left Strathpeffer at 8.30 a.m. and the last left at 4.30 p.m. In 1922 and 1942, no trains were operated on Sundays.

Preceding station	Disused railways	Following station
Dingwall; Line closed, station open	Highland Railway; D&SR Strathpeffer Branch	Terminus

== Locomotives ==
The first locomotive, Strathpeffer, was a 2-2-2 and was underpowered even for the easy gradients of the branch. In 1890 the Highland Railway locomotive engineer David Jones designed an 0-4-4 saddle tank design; the new Strathpeffer was given a second-hand boiler from another 2-2-2, and in 1901 it was altered to a side-tank configuration. In 1903 it was transferred to work the Wick and Lybster Light Railway. That engine was replaced by a third Strathpeffer, a similar 0-4-4 tank design built at Inverness.

Numerous other visiting engines appeared on the branch, including the elegant "Loch" class 4-4-0s designed by David Jones, which worked the Strathpeffer expresses.

A Sentinel steam railcar was allocated to the branch for a period; it was no 4349, built in 1927 and scrapped in 1939, but it is not known to have been on the branch throughout that time span.

== Highland Museum of Childhood ==
The old railway station building currently performs an important role in the town's tourist trade and cultural activities. It houses the Highland Museum of Childhood, several retail shops and a cafe. When it opened in 1992, this became the fourth museum of childhood in Britain. Initially, the museum was based on the doll and toy collection of former Strathpeffer resident, Mrs Angela Kellie but subsequently expanded to tell the story of childhood in the Scottish Highlands. It rented space in Strathpeffer's restored Victorian railway station building and by 2007 had an average of 8,500 visitors a year. In 2009 a board of trustees purchased the station building from Highland Council.

The museum is independent and fully accredited via Museums Galleries Scotland; it operates as a company limited by guarantee with charitable status. It became a registered charity from 1 January 1992.

The museum tells the story of childhood in the Highlands of Scotland, using photographic collections, interpretive displays and artefacts. The collections include dolls, toys, games, children's costumes and childhood furniture. Themes include Birth and Baptism, Homelife, Health and Nutrition, Leisure, Child Labour and Education. There is an oral-history film, "A Century of Highland Childhood".

== Railway restoration project ==
A locally based group has outlined plans for restoration of steam train services to Strathpeffer, starting with an initial one-mile length of track. It later hopes to extend the track to reach the existing main line.

== Other references ==
- Bradshaws, none (2011). Bradshaw's Railway Guide December 1895 (reprint ed.). Middleton Press. ISBN 978-1-908174-11-6.
- Bradshaws, none (1922). Bradshaw's July 1922 Railway Guide (reprint ed.). David & Charles.
- Blacklock, Henry (1942). Bradshaws Guide to the British Railways.
- Butt, R. V. J. (October 1995). The Directory of Railway Stations: details every public and private passenger station, halt, platform and stopping place, past and present (1st ed.). Sparkford: Patrick Stephens Ltd. ISBN 978-1-85260-508-7. OCLC 60251199. OL 11956311M.
- Hurst, Geoffrey (1991). Register of Closed Railways 1948–1991. Milepost Publications. ISBN 0-947796-18-5.
- Ward, L. (March 1960). Dock, R.E. (ed.). ""Strathpeffer" Highland Railway 2-2-2 Tank No. 12". Model Railway News. Vol. 36, no. 423.
