= Dingwall railway station =

Railway station in Highland, Scotland

Dingwall Scottish Gaelic: Inbhir Pheofharain
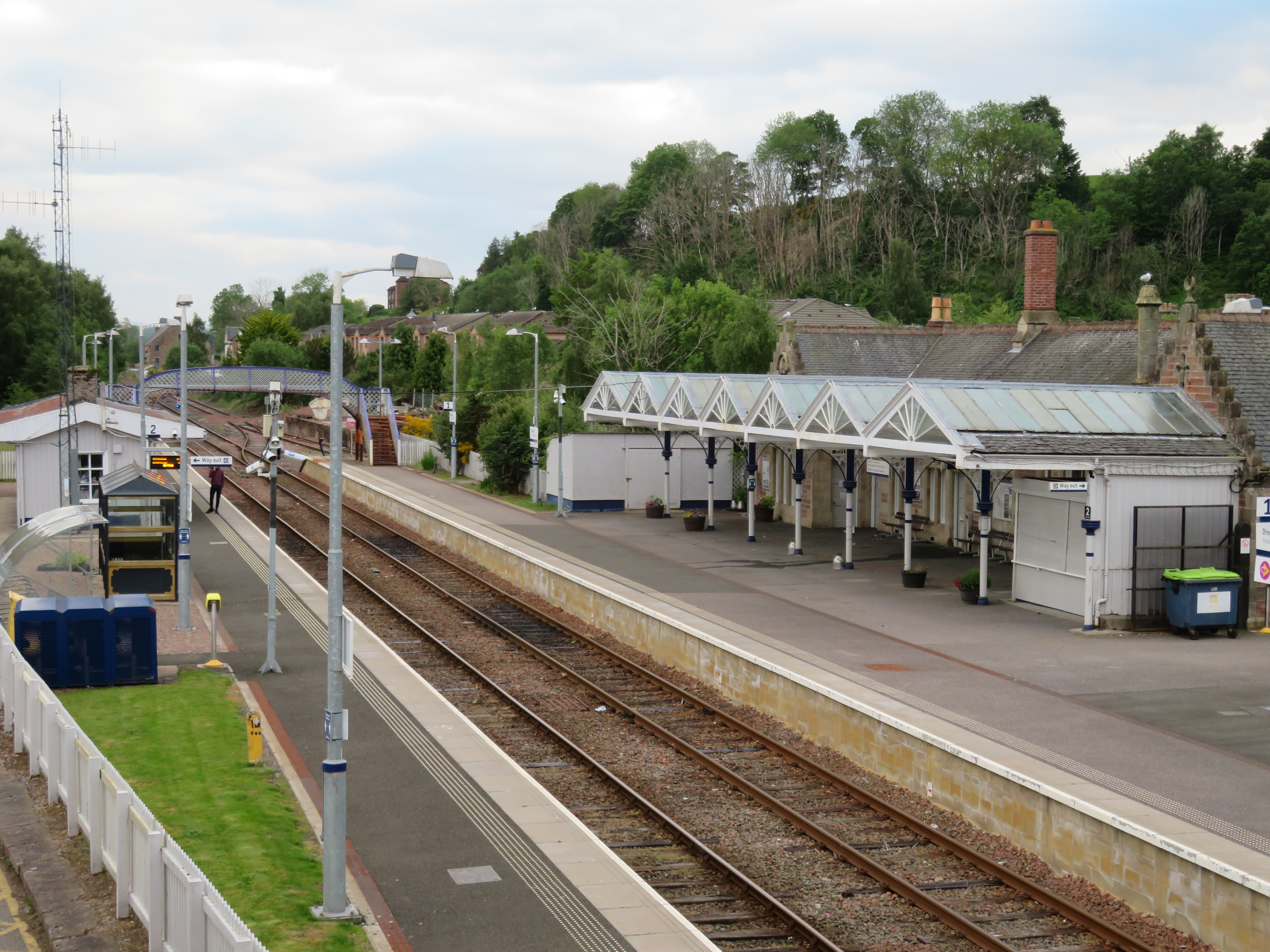
- The platforms at Dingwall station, looking south

General information
- Location: Dingwall, Highland; Scotland
- Coordinates: 57.5942°N 4.4222°W
- Grid reference: NH553585
- Manager: ScotRail
- Platforms: 2

Other information
- Station code: DIN

History
- Original company: Inverness and Ross-shire Railway
- Pre-grouping: Highland Railway
- Post-grouping: LMS

Key dates
- 11 June 1862: Opened

Passengers
- 2021/22: ▲46,524
- Interchange: ▲272
- 2022/23: ▲55,536
- Interchange: ▲304
- 2023/24: ▲63,976
- Interchange: ▲387
- 2024/25: ▼62,120
- Interchange: ▼383
- 2025/26: ▼59,560
- Interchange: ▼313

Listed Building – Category B
- Designated: 25 February 1986
- Reference no.: LB24514
Location
Notes
- Passenger statistics from the Office of Rail and Road

Dingwall railway station serves Dingwall, Scotland. It is located just south of the junction of the Far North Line and the Kyle of Lochalsh Line, and is managed and served by ScotRail. The station is 18 miles 58 chains (30.1 km) from Inverness, and is the zero point for the Kyle of Lochalsh Line. It is sited after Conon Bridge heading northbound, with the next station being either Garve or Alness.

== History ==
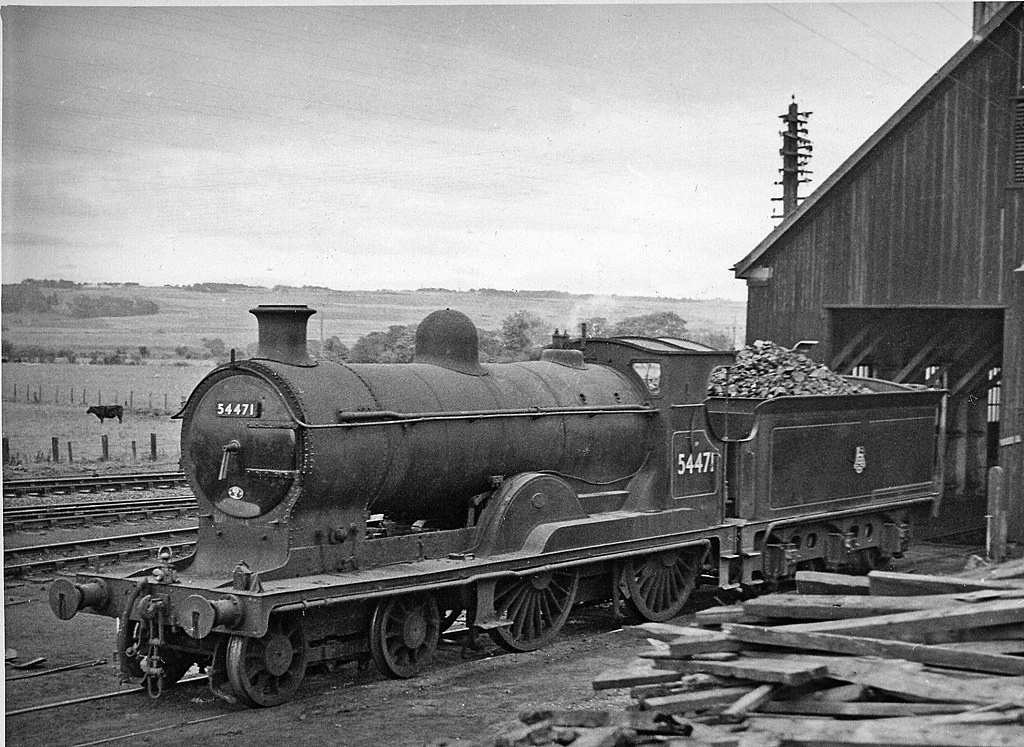
Dingwall engine shed in 1957

The station was built by the Inverness and Ross-shire Railway (I&RR) and opened on 11 June 1862 when the company's line was opened from Inverness to Dingwall. The extension to Invergordon came on 23 March 1863. The I&RR was consolidated with the Inverness and Aberdeen Junction Railway on 30 June 1862. The operating name became the Highland Railway (HR) on 29 June 1865. Under Highland Railway ownership the current station buildings were erected in 1886 by architect Murdoch Paterson.

The HR became a constituent of the London Midland and Scottish Railway (LMSR) in 1923.

The main passenger services through the station were to Wick and Thurso and to Kyle of Lochalsh. Between 1885 and 1946 there was a branch line service to Strathpeffer.

The Highland Railway built a small steam locomotive shed near the station and this continued in use by the LMSR and British Railways until closure at the end of steam locomotive operations in the area in the early 1960s. It was a sub-shed of the large Inverness facility.

Historic Scotland designate the current station and platforms as Category B.

=== Accidents and incidents ===
In 1897, an evening train from Dingwall heading towards Garve stopped short of a summit, and the rear coaches of the train ran back down the steep ascent towards Dingwall, as the coupling failed. They stopped just before reaching the junction to the north of the station. The only damage was to some level crossing gates, which were demolished by the coaches.

On 22 January 2010, a Class 158 Express Sprinter unit (158701) working the 17:15 Inverness to Ardgay service derailed at Dingwall; nobody was badly injured, but one female passenger was taken to hospital as a precaution.

== Facilities ==
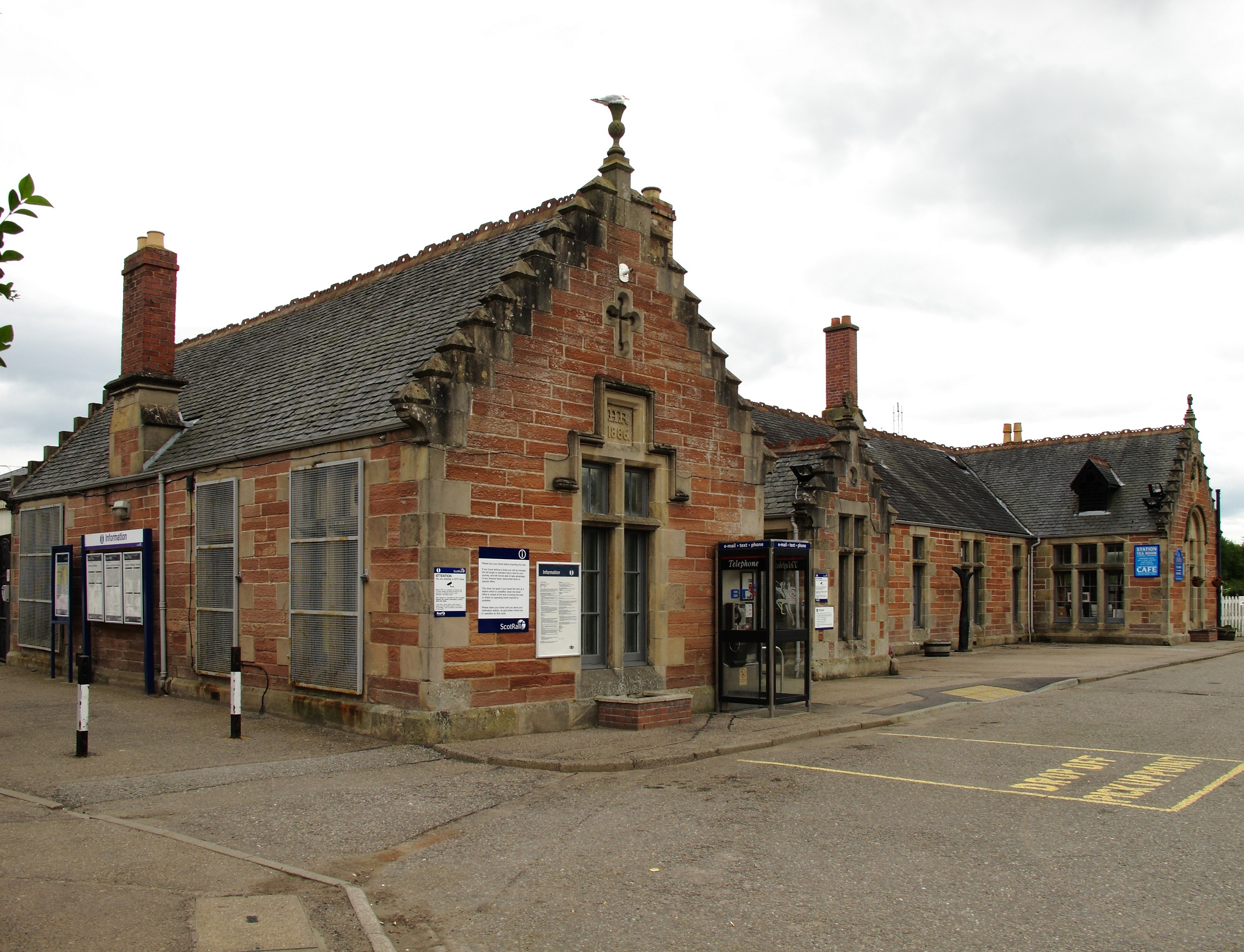
The station building

Both platforms have benches and help points, with most of the main facilities sited on platform 1, being a concourse, a disabled toilet, ticket office, and a bar. There is a small car park (adjacent to which is a payphone) and bike racks next to platform 1. Platform 2 also has a waiting room and a shelter. Both platforms have step-free access.

== Platform layout ==
It has a passing loop 32 chains (640 m) long, with two platforms. Platform 1 on the northbound line can accommodate trains having eight coaches, whereas platform 2 on the southbound line can hold ten.

== Passenger volume ==
Passenger Volume at Dingwall
| | 2004–05 | 2005–06 | 2006–07 | 2007–08 | 2008–09 | 2009–10 | 2010–11 | 2011–12 | 2012–13 | 2013–14 | 2014–15 | 2015–16 | 2016–17 | 2017–18 | 2018–19 | 2019–20 | 2020–21 | 2021–22 | 2022–23 | 2023–24 | 2024–25 |
|---|---|---|---|---|---|---|---|---|---|---|---|---|---|---|---|---|---|---|---|---|---|
| Entries and exits | 34,898 | 43,508 | 55,034 | 64,404 | 72,086 | 80,324 | 84,920 | 101,730 | 104,746 | 101,996 | 87,782 | 82,508 | 80,900 | 86,276 | 81,408 | 80,154 | 9,864 | 46,524 | 55,536 | 63,976 | 62,120 |
| Interchanges | 160 | 178 | 141 | 186 | 717 | 8,172 | 598 | 660 | 442 | 7,834 | 583 | 445 | 421 | 491 | 487 | 431 | 31 | 272 | 304 | 387 | 383 |

The statistics cover twelve month periods that start in April.

== Services ==
As Dingwall is a key station on the Far North Line, all trains stop here regardless of destination.

On weekdays and Saturdays, the station sees 7 trains northbound (4 to Wick via Thurso, 1 to Invergordon, 1 to Ardgay, 1 to Tain), 4 trains westbound to Kyle of Lochalsh, and 14 trains southbound to Inverness. On Sundays, the station sees 5 trains northbound (1 to Wick, 3 to Tain, 1 to Invergordon), 1 train westbound to Kyle of Lochalsh, and 6 trains southbound to Inverness.

| Preceding station | National Rail | Following station |
|---|---|---|
| Conon Bridge or Muir of Ord | ScotRail; Kyle of Lochalsh Line | Garve |
| Conon Bridge or Muir of Ord | ScotRail; Far North Line | Alness or Invergordon or Terminus |
| | Historical railways | |
| Conon; Line and station open | Highland Railway; Inverness and Ross-shire Railway | Foulis; Line open; station closed |
| Conon; Line and station open | Highland Railway; Dingwall and Skye Railway | Achterneed; Line open; station closed |
| | Disused railways | |
| Terminus | Highland Railway; D&SR Strathpeffer Branch | Strathpeffer; Line and station closed |

== Bibliography ==
- Awdry, Christopher (1990). Encyclopaedia of British Railway Companies. Sparkford: Patrick Stephens Ltd. ISBN 1-8526-0049-7. OCLC 19514063. CN 8983.
- Brailsford, Martyn, ed. (December 2017) [1987]. Railway Track Diagrams 1: Scotland & Isle of Man (6th ed.). Frome: Trackmaps. ISBN 978-0-9549866-9-8.
- Butt, R. V. J. (October 1995). The Directory of Railway Stations: details every public and private passenger station, halt, platform and stopping place, past and present (1st ed.). Sparkford: Patrick Stephens Ltd. ISBN 978-1-85260-508-7. OCLC 60251199. OL 11956311M.
- Fuller, Aidan L.F. (1961). British Locomotive Shed Directory. Railway Publications Ltd.
- Gifford, John (1992). The Buildings of Scotland, Highland and Islands. Yale University Press. ISBN 0-300-09625-9.
- Historic Environment Scotland. "Dingwall railway station. Down and up platform ranges, Down platform staff shelter (LB24514)".
- Jowett, Alan (March 1989). Jowett's Railway Atlas of Great Britain and Ireland: From Pre-Grouping to the Present Day (1st ed.). Sparkford: Patrick Stephens Ltd. ISBN 978-1-85260-086-0. OCLC 22311137.
- Jowett, Alan (2000). Jowett's Nationalised Railway Atlas (1st ed.). Penryn, Cornwall: Atlantic Transport Publishers. ISBN 978-0-906899-99-1. OCLC 228266687.
