= Delny railway station =

Disused railway station in Highland, Scotland

Delny
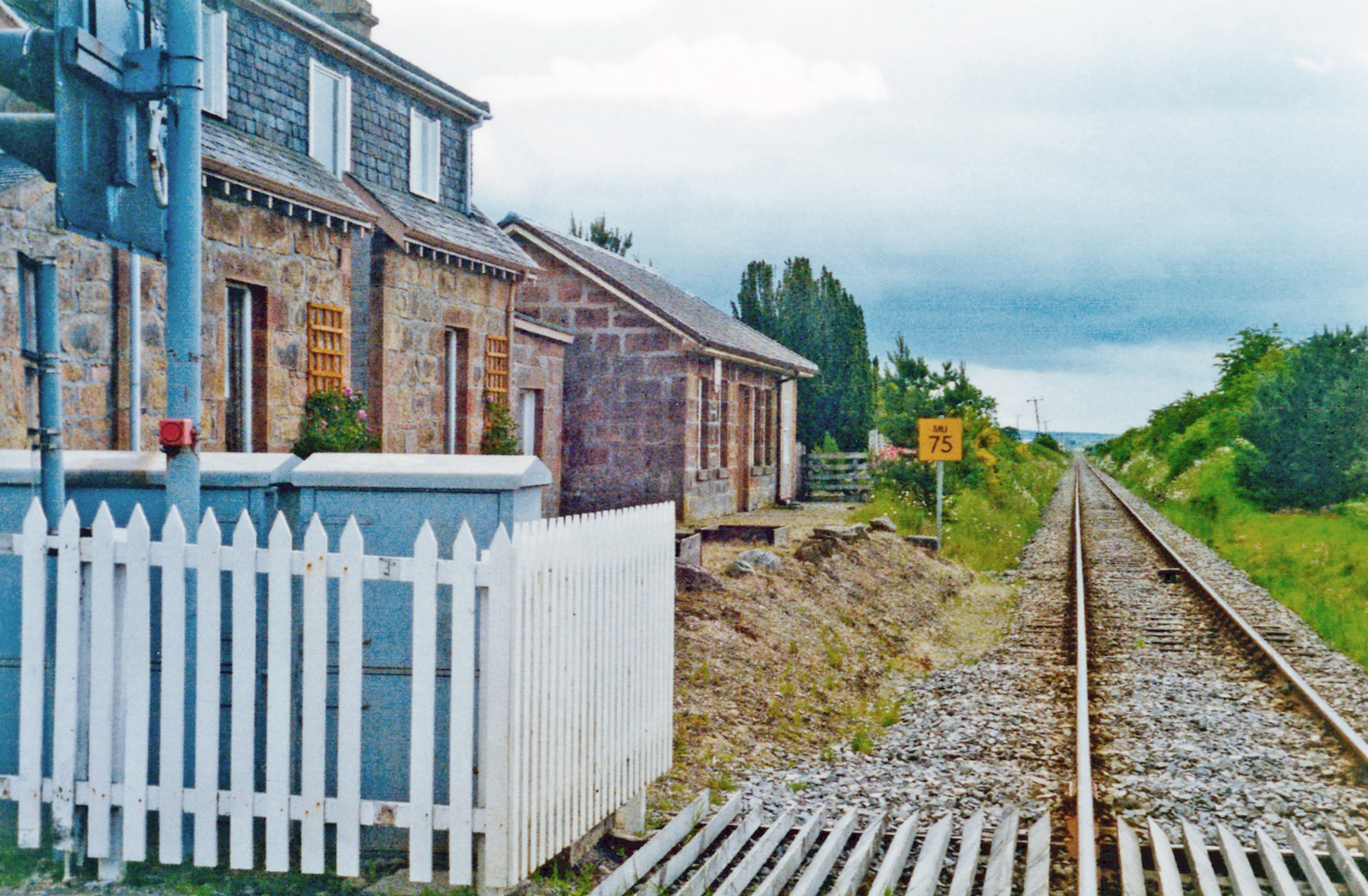
- The site of the station in 1994

General information
- Location: Delny, Ross-shire; Scotland
- Coordinates: 57.7256°N 4.1089°W
- Grid reference: NH745726

Other information
- Status: Disused

History
- Original company: Inverness and Aberdeen Junction Railway
- Pre-grouping: Highland Railway
- Post-grouping: London, Midland and Scottish Railway

Key dates
- 1 June 1864: Opened
- 13 June 1960: Closed to passengers
- 1964: Closed completely
Location

Delny railway station served the hamlet of Delny, Ross-shire, Scotland from 1864 to 1964 on the Inverness and Ross-shire Railway.

== History ==
The station opened on 1 June 1864 by the Inverness and Aberdeen Junction Railway. The station was closed to passengers on 13 June 1960 and completely in 1964.

Preceding station	Historical railways	Following station
Invergordon; Line and station open	Highland Railway; Inverness and Ross-shire Railway	Kildary; Line open, station closed
