= Invergordon railway station =

Railway station in Highland, Scotland

Invergordon Scottish Gaelic: Inbhir Ghòrdain
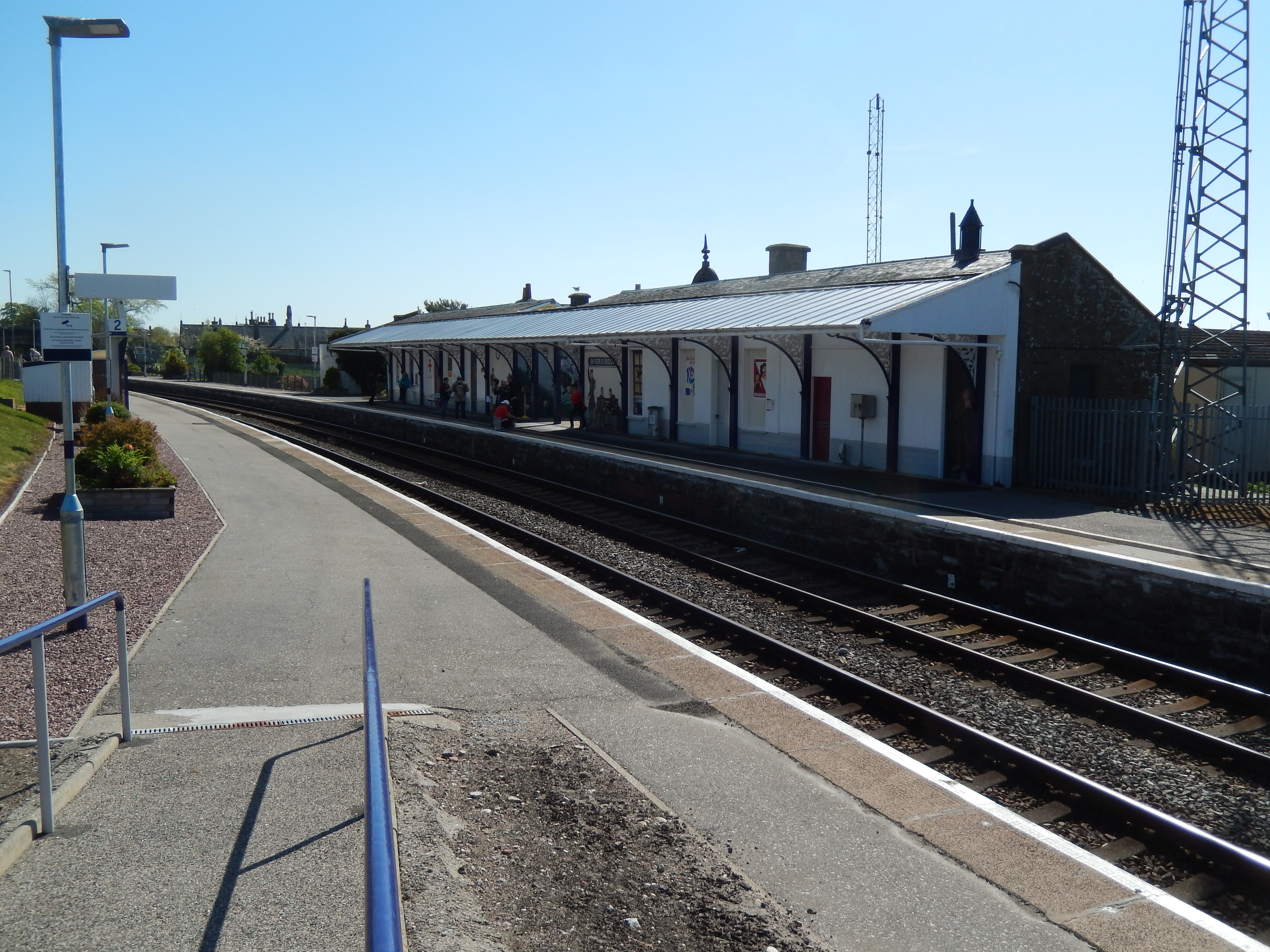

General information
- Location: Invergordon, Highland; Scotland
- Coordinates: 57.6891°N 4.1745°W
- Grid reference: NH704686
- Manager: ScotRail
- Platforms: 2

Other information
- Station code: IGD

History
- Original company: Inverness and Ross-shire Railway
- Pre-grouping: Highland Railway
- Post-grouping: LMSR

Key dates
- 23 March 1863: Opened

Passengers
- 2021/22: ▲13,308
- 2022/23: ▲18,758
- 2023/24: ▲28,580
- 2024/25: ▼23,476
- 2025/26: ▲23,872
Location
Notes
- Passenger statistics from the Office of Rail and Road

Invergordon railway station is a railway station serving the town of Invergordon on the Cromarty Firth, in the Highland council area of Scotland. It is located on the Far North Line, 31 miles 37 chains (50.6 km) from Inverness, between Alness and Fearn. ScotRail, who manage the station, operate all services.

== History ==
The station opened on 23 March 1863, as part of the Inverness and Ross-shire Railway, later the Highland Railway and then the London, Midland and Scottish Railway.

=== Accidents and incidents ===
On 26 November 1944, Royal Air Force Short Sunderland DD851 of the No. 4 (Coastal) Operational Training Unit departed Cromarty Firth, RAF Alness on an anti-submarine patrol of the North Sea off the coast of Scotland. During the initial climb a connecting rod on the starboard inner engine broke, the engine caught fire and fell off. The Sunderland, with a full load of fuel and depth charges then crashed into the railway line 2 miles (3 km) northeast of Invergordon railway station where all 11 of the Royal Canadian Air Force (RCAF) crew were killed. The crew are buried in the Stonefall Air Force Cemetery in Harrogate, North Yorkshire.

== Facilities ==
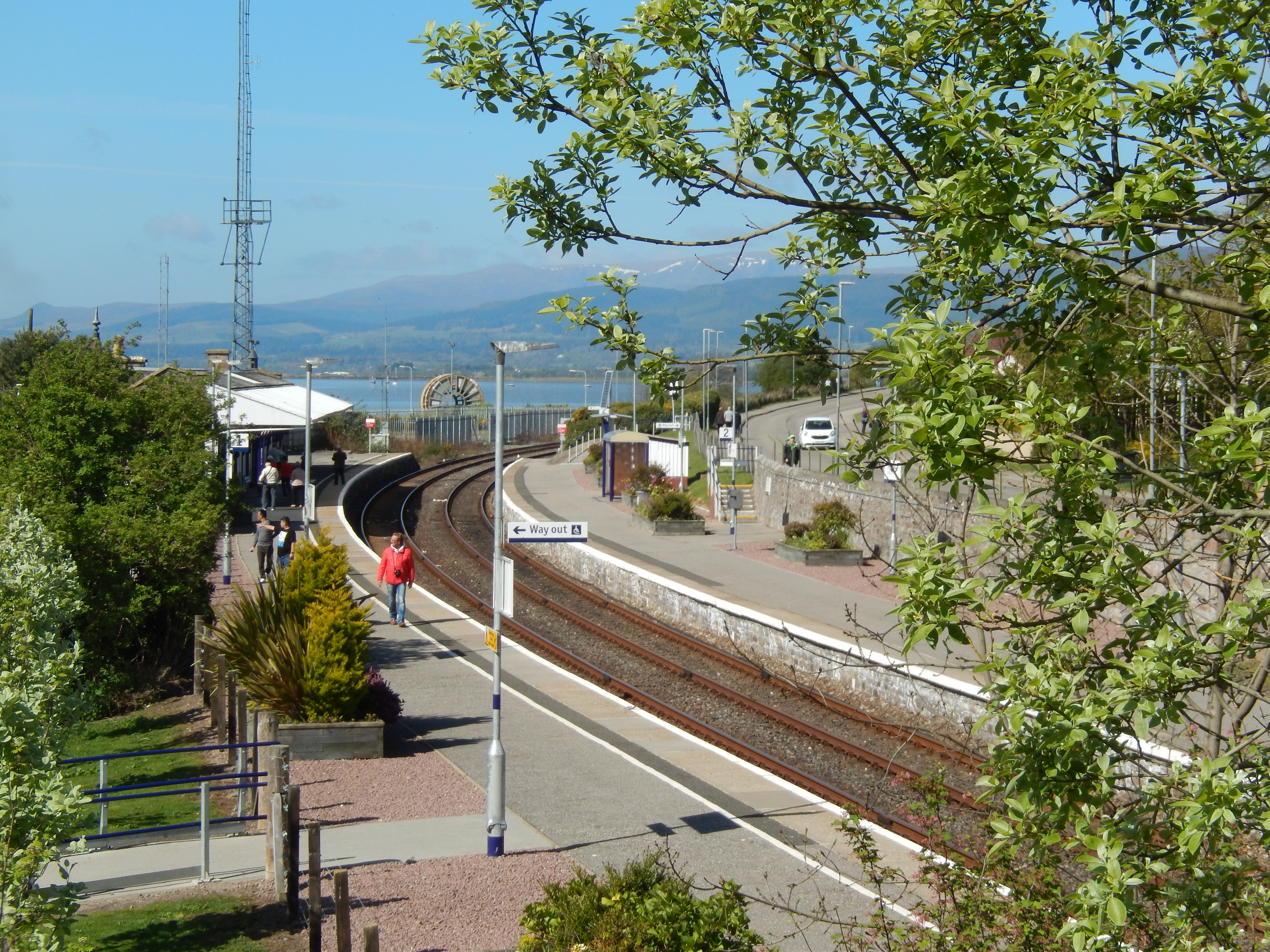
The station as seen in 2017

Both platforms have a help point and benches, whilst only platform 2 has a shelter (passengers on platform 1 have to use the old station buildings for shelter). There is a car park and bike racks adjacent to platform 1. Both platforms have multiple entries, all with step-free access. As there are no facilities to purchase tickets, passengers must buy one in advance, or from the guard on the train.

== Platform layout ==
The station consists of two side platforms, which can each accommodate an eight-coach train, flanking a passing loop 34 chains (680 m) long on the predominantly single-track line from Dingwall to Thurso and Wick.

== Passenger volume ==
Passenger Volume at Invergordon
	2004–05	2005–06	2006–07	2007–08	2008–09	2009–10	2010–11	2011–12	2012–13	2013–14	2014–15	2015–16	2016–17	2017–18	2018–19	2019–20	2020–21	2021–22	2022–23	2023–24	2024–25
Entries and exits	8,109	9,195	12,949	15,853	19,974	20,648	23,444	34,564	34,974	36,355	31,962	29,054	27,886	28,958	28,806	27,826	3,134	13,308	18,758	28,580	23,476

The statistics cover twelve month periods that start in April.

== Services ==
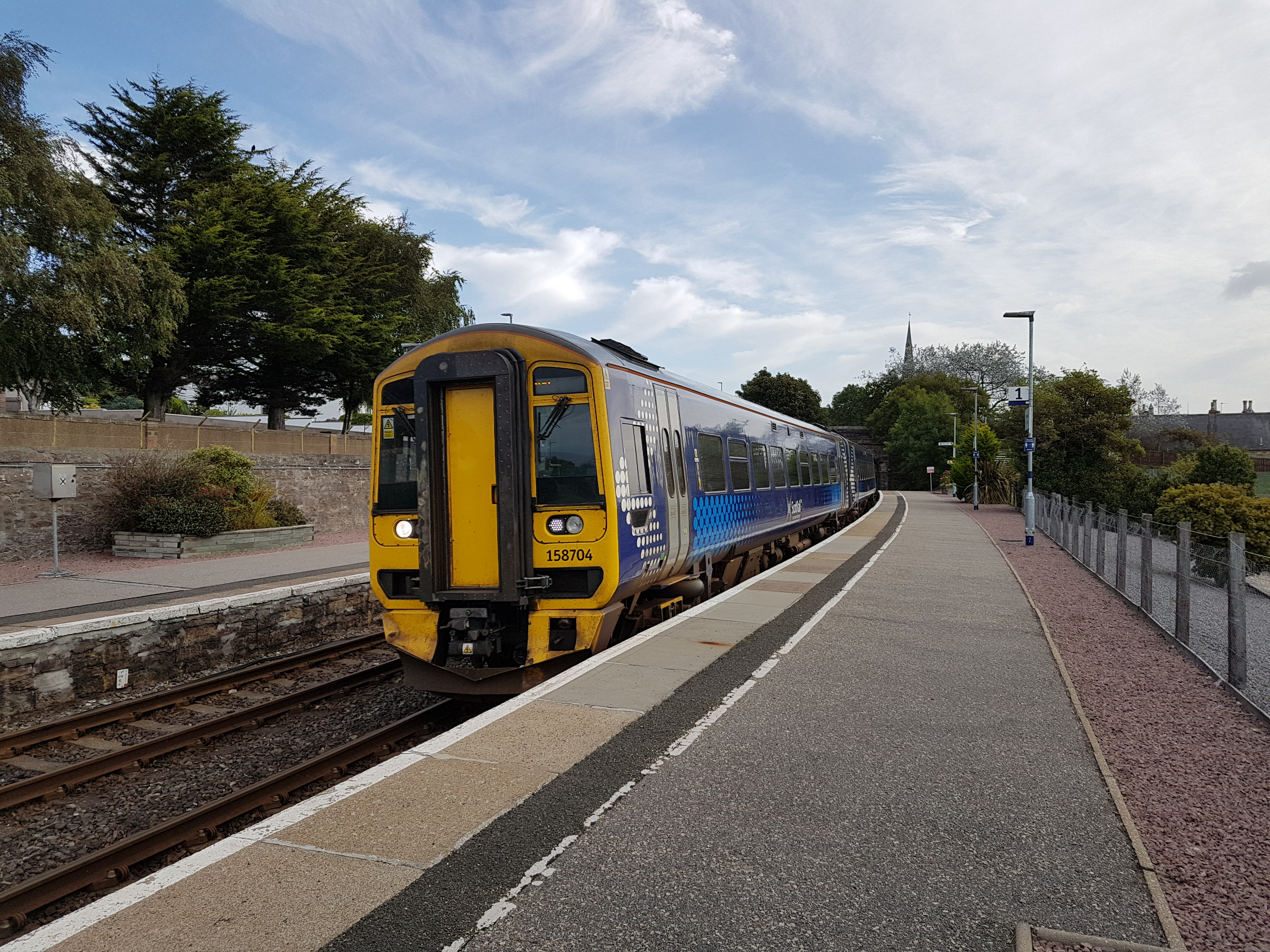
A train calling at Invergordon in 2021

The station has seen a number of timetable improvements since 2008, with the addition of an extra through train each way to/from Wick on weekdays and further shorter distance services to/from Inverness aimed at the commuter market (these mainly run as far as Tain or Ardgay). Prior to this, 3 departures in each direction was the standard service on the line for many years.

In the December 2021 timetable, the station sees 6 services northbound on weekdays (4 to Wick via Thurso, 1 to Ardgay, 1 to Tain) and 4 northbound on Sundays (1 to Wick, 3 to Tain). On weekdays and Saturdays, there are 9 services southbound to Inverness, with 5 on Sundays.

Preceding station	National Rail	Following station
Alness or Dingwall	ScotRail; Far North Line	Fearn or Tain or Terminates here
	Historical railways	
Alness; Line and station open	Highland Railway; Inverness and Ross-shire Railway	Delny; Line open; Station closed

== Bibliography ==
- Quick, Michael (2022). Railway Passenger Stations in Great Britain: A Chronology (PDF) (5th ed.). London: Railway and Canal Historical Society.
