= Achterneed railway station =

Disused railway station in Highland, Scotland

Achterneed
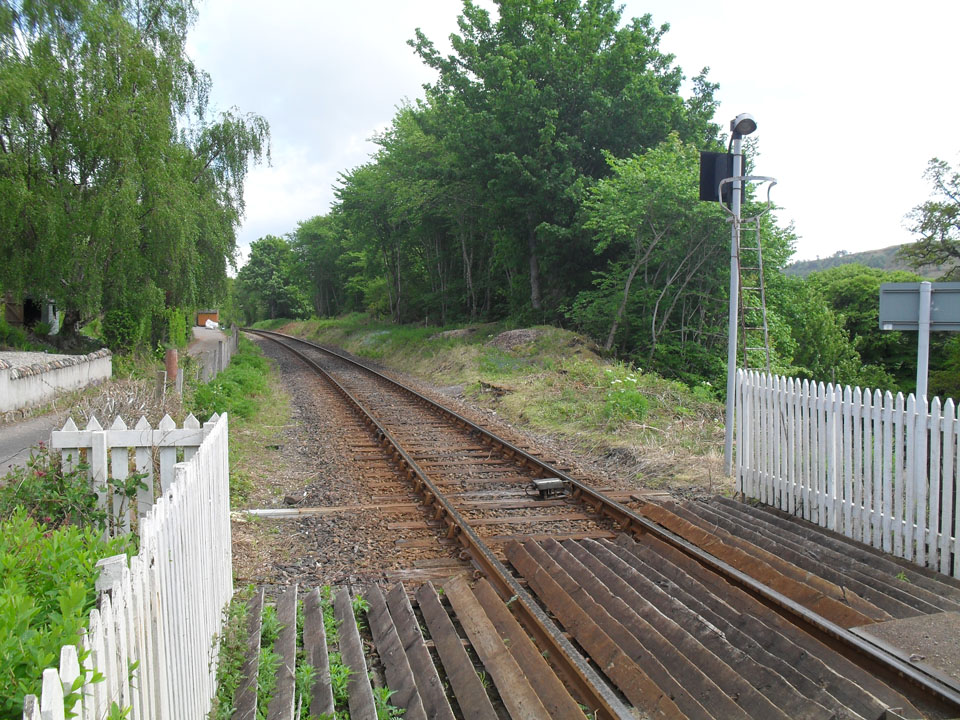
- The site and remains of Achterneed Station, 2010

General information
- Location: Strathpeffer, Highland; Scotland
- Coordinates: 57.6027°N 4.5271°W
- Grid reference: NH490597
- Platforms: 1

Other information
- Status: Disused

History
- Opened: 19 August 1870 (as Strathpeffer)
- Original company: Dingwall and Skye Railway
- Pre-grouping: Highland Railway
- Post-grouping: LMS

Key dates
- 3 June 1885: Name changed to Achterneed
- 7 December 1965: Station closed
Location

Achterneed railway station was a railway station serving Strathpeffer and located on the Kyle of Lochalsh Line, in Wester Ross, Highland, Scotland.

== History ==
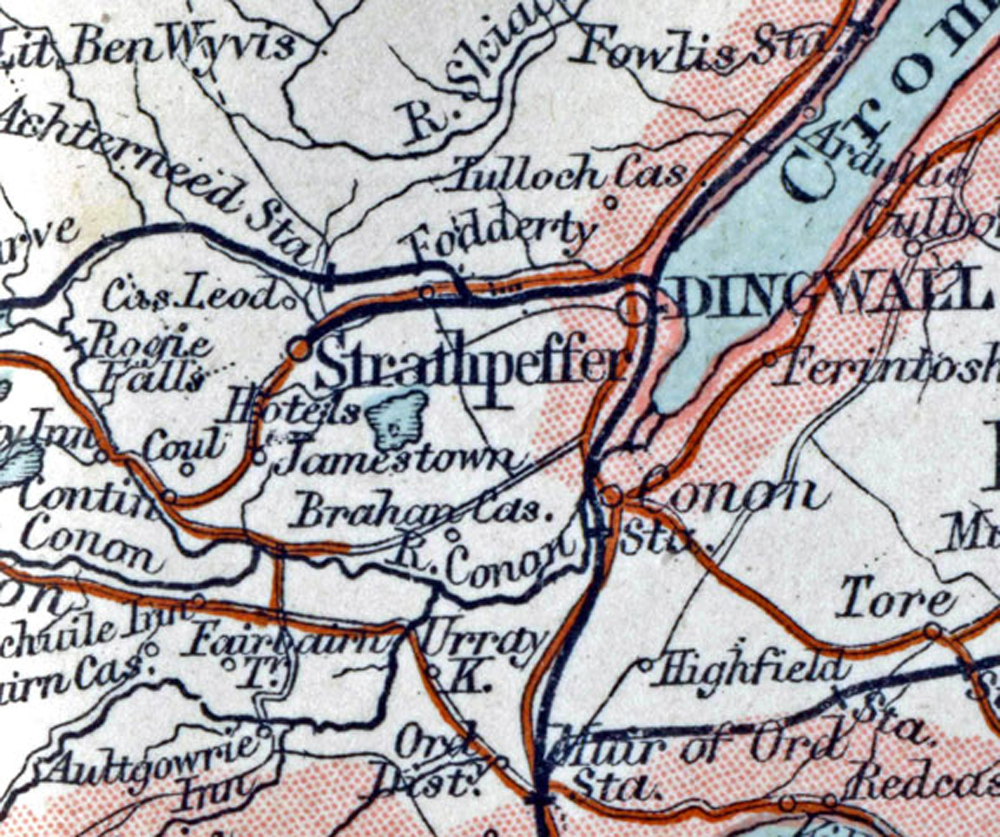
1899 map showing the location of the station 2 miles NNE of Strathpeffer

Opened in 1870, the station was sited two miles NNE of Strathpeffer between Dingwall and Garve. It was initially named Strathpeffer but the name was changed to avoid passenger confusion when the branch line to that town from Dingwall opened in 1885.

The station was opened by the Dingwall and Skye Railway, but operated from the outset by the Highland Railway.

On 25 September 1897 a mixed passenger and goods train from Dingwall to Strome Ferry was approaching the summit of the line at Raven's Rock, just west of Achterneed station, when the coupling broke between the 5th and 6th vehicles and the 10 rear vehicles of the train ran backwards for a distance of 6 miles, coming to a halt just before the junction with the main line at Dingwall. The station master at Achterneed noticed the runaway train, and sent notice to Dingwall. The signalman at Dingwall managed to alert two intermediate level crossings. The crossing keeper at the first location was away from her house and the crossing gates were smashed. The keeper at the second location managed to close her gates and prevent any damage.

The station was taken into the London, Midland and Scottish Railway during the Grouping of 1923, the line then passed on to the Scottish Region of British Railways on nationalisation in 1948.

The station was closed by the British Railways Board in 1965.

== Services ==
Preceding station	Historical railways	Following station
Dingwall	Highland Railway; Dingwall and Skye Railway	Garve
