= Kildary railway station =

Disused railway station in Highland, Scotland

Kildary

General information
- Location: Kildary, Highland; Scotland
- Coordinates: 57.7442°N 4.0761°W
- Grid reference: NH765746
- Platforms: 1

Other information
- Status: Disused

History
- Original company: Inverness and Aberdeen Junction Railway
- Pre-grouping: Highland Railway
- Post-grouping: London, Midland and Scottish Railway

Key dates
- 1 June 1864: Opened as Parkhill
- 1 May 1868: Name changed to Kildary
- 13 June 1960: Closed
Location

Kildary railway station served the village of Kildary, Highland, Scotland from 1864 to 1960 on the Inverness and Ross-shire Railway.

== History ==
The station opened as Parkhill on 1 June 1864 by the Inverness and Aberdeen Junction Railway. The name was changed to Kildary on 1 May 1868.

The station had a goods yard to its north west equipped with a 3 ton crane. The station was host to a LMS caravan in 1936 and possibly 1937.

The station closed to both passengers and goods traffic on 13 June 1960.

Preceding station	Historical railways	Following station
Delny; Line open, station closed	Highland Railway; Inverness and Ross-shire Railway	Nigg; Line open, station closed
