= Nigg railway station =

Disused railway station in Highland, Scotland

Nigg
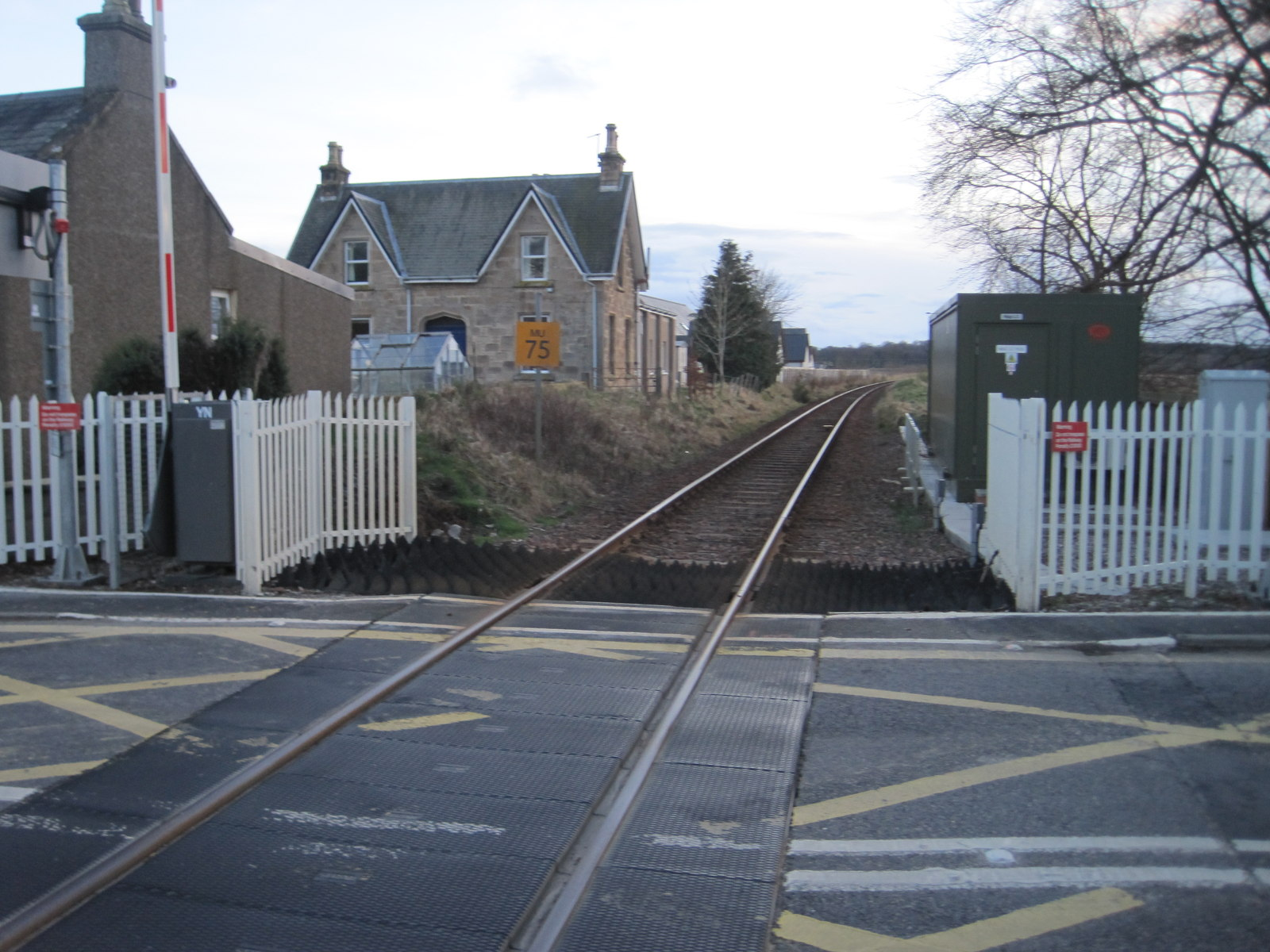
- The site of the station, looking southwest towards Kildary, in 2015

General information
- Location: Nigg, Highland; Scotland
- Coordinates: 57.7611°N 4.0157°W
- Grid reference: NH801763
- Platforms: 1

Other information
- Status: Disused

History
- Original company: Inverness and Aberdeen Junction Railway
- Pre-grouping: Highland Railway
- Post-grouping: London, Midland and Scottish Railway

Key dates
- 1 June 1864: Opened
- 13 June 1960: Closed
Location

Nigg railway station served the village of Nigg, Highland, Scotland from 1864 to 1960 on the Inverness and Ross-shire Railway.

== History ==
The station opened on 1 June 1864 by the Inverness and Aberdeen Junction Railway. It closed to both passengers and goods traffic on 13 June 1960.

Preceding station	Historical railways	Following station
Kildary; Line open, station closed	Highland Railway; Inverness and Ross-shire Railway	Fearn; Line and station open
