= Tain railway station =

Railway station in Highland, Scotland

Tain Scottish Gaelic: Baile Dhubhthaich
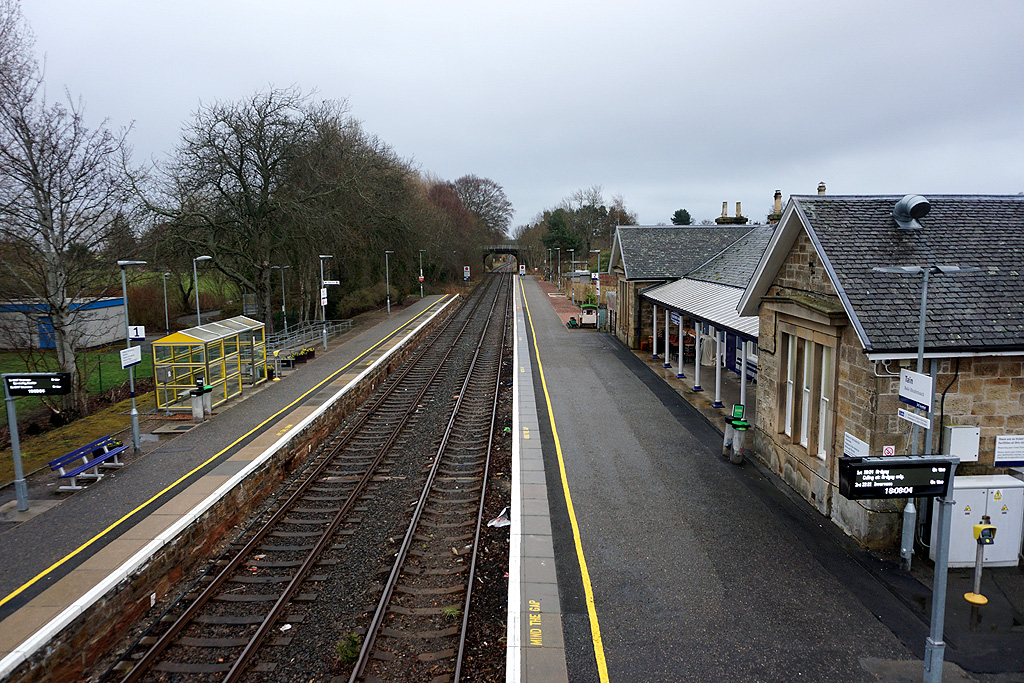
- Tain station in 2022, looking southeast

General information
- Location: Tain, Highland; Scotland
- Coordinates: 57.8144°N 4.0519°W
- Grid reference: NH781823
- Manager: ScotRail
- Platforms: 2

Other information
- Station code: TAI

History
- Original company: Inverness and Ross-shire Railway
- Pre-grouping: Highland Railway
- Post-grouping: LMSR

Key dates
- 1 June 1864: Opened

Passengers
- 2021/22: ▲19,664
- 2022/23: ▼19,606
- 2023/24: ▲23,672
- 2024/25: ▼23,284
- 2025/26: ▼21,674

Listed Building – Category B
- Designated: 6 October 1978
- Reference no.: LB41910
Location
Notes
- Passenger statistics from the Office of Rail and Road

Tain railway station is an unstaffed railway station serving the area of Tain in the Highland council area of Scotland. The station is on the Far North Line, 44 miles 23 chains (71.3 km) from Inverness, between Fearn and Ardgay. ScotRail, who manage the station, operate all services.

== History ==
The station was opened on 1 June 1864 by the Highland Railway.

There have been two engine sheds at Tain in the past: the first was timber-built and originally from Invergordon, which included a turntable. It was re-erected and reopened in June 1864, but burned down on 20 April 1877. The second was stone-built and opened in 1877. There were no facilities at the shed, although there was a water column and a turntable at the station. It was closed on 18 June 1962, and later demolished.

== Facilities ==
Both platforms have benches, although only platform 1 has a shelter. There is step-free access to both platforms (from two car parks, 1 adjacent to each platform), although the platforms are connected via a footbridge. The only help point is on platform 2. As there are no facilities to purchase tickets, passengers must buy one in advance, or from the guard on the train.

== Platform layout ==
The station has a passing loop 24 chains (480 m) long, with two platforms. Platform 1 on the southbound line can accommodate trains having seven coaches, whereas platform 2 on the down northbound line can hold eight.

== Passenger volume ==
Passenger Volume at Tain
	2004–05	2005–06	2006–07	2007–08	2008–09	2009–10	2010–11	2011–12	2012–13	2013–14	2014–15	2015–16	2016–17	2017–18	2018–19	2019–20	2020–21	2021–22	2022–23	2023–24	2024–25
Entries and exits	11,174	13,837	18,521	20,847	23,922	24,340	26,944	33,638	34,016	34,578	30,004	27,896	28,622	29,774	29,384	28,036	3,522	19,664	19,606	23,672	23,284

The statistics cover twelve month periods that start in April.

== Services ==
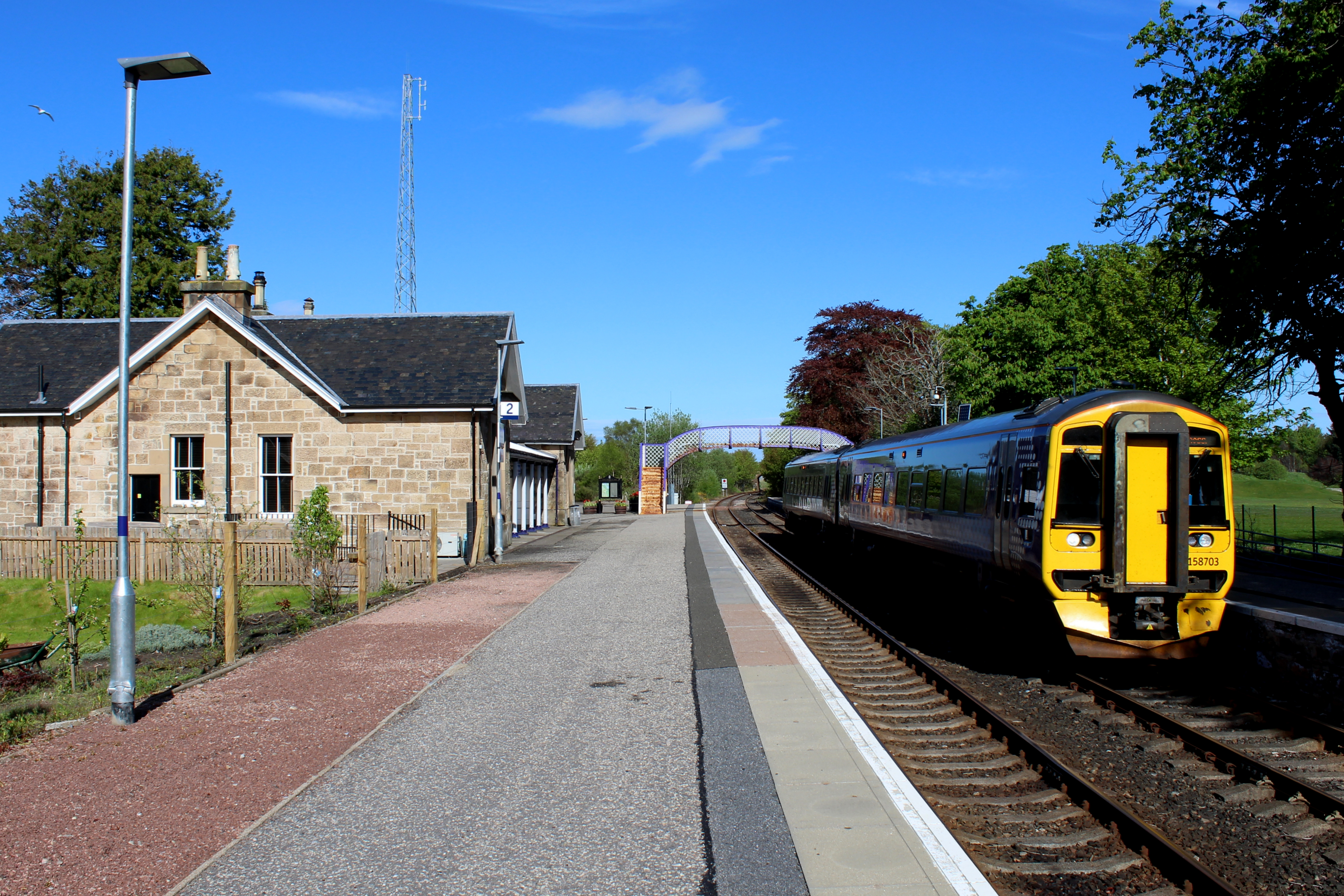
A ScotRail Class 158 at Tain, with a service bound for Inverness

There are five through trains northbound (four to Wick & Thurso, one to Ardgay) in the December 2021 timetable, and eight trains to Inverness southbound on weekdays & Saturdays. The additional departures to Inverness run mainly in the morning peak & evening and are run primarily for commuters. On Sundays there are four trains to Inverness and a single departure to Wick.

Preceding station	National Rail	Following station
Fearn or Invergordon	ScotRail; Far North Line	Ardgay or Terminates here
	Historical railways	
Fearn; Line and station open	Highland Railway; Inverness and Ross-shire Railway	Meikle Ferry; Line open; Station closed

== Bibliography ==
- Brailsford, Martyn, ed. (December 2017) [1987]. Railway Track Diagrams 1: Scotland & Isle of Man (6th ed.). Frome: Trackmaps. ISBN 978-0-9549866-9-8.
- Butt, R. V. J. (October 1995). The Directory of Railway Stations: details every public and private passenger station, halt, platform and stopping place, past and present (1st ed.). Sparkford: Patrick Stephens Ltd. ISBN 978-1-85260-508-7. OCLC 60251199. OL 11956311M.
- Jowett, Alan (March 1989). Jowett's Railway Atlas of Great Britain and Ireland: From Pre-Grouping to the Present Day (1st ed.). Sparkford: Patrick Stephens Ltd. ISBN 978-1-85260-086-0. OCLC 22311137.
