= Smerral =

Coordinates: 58.27954°N 3.39967°W

- Location within the Caithness area
- OS grid reference: ND180331
- Council area: Highland
- Country: Scotland
- Sovereign state: United Kingdom
- Post town: Latheron
- Postcode district: KW5 6
- Police: Scotland
- Fire: Scottish
- Ambulance: Scottish

Smerral is a small hamlet on the eastern coast of Caithness, Scottish Highlands and is in the Scottish council area of Highland. It lies 1 mile (1.6 km) northwest of Latheronwheel. Smerral is the location of an iron age broch. The broch measures some 18.5 metres (61 ft) by 3 metres (9.8 ft).

== See also ==
- Latheronwheel
