= Landhallow =

Coordinates: 58.27982°N 3.40206°W

- Location within the Caithness area
- Population: 142
- OS grid reference: ND178332
- Council area: Highland
- Country: Scotland
- Sovereign state: United Kingdom
- Post town: Latheron
- Postcode district: KW5 6
- Police: Scotland
- Fire: Scottish
- Ambulance: Scottish

Landhallow is a small village, approximately 1.6 km (1 mi) west of Latheron in eastern Caithness, Scottish Highlands and is in the Scottish council area of Highland.
