= Gillock =

Coordinates: 58.516°N 3.354°W

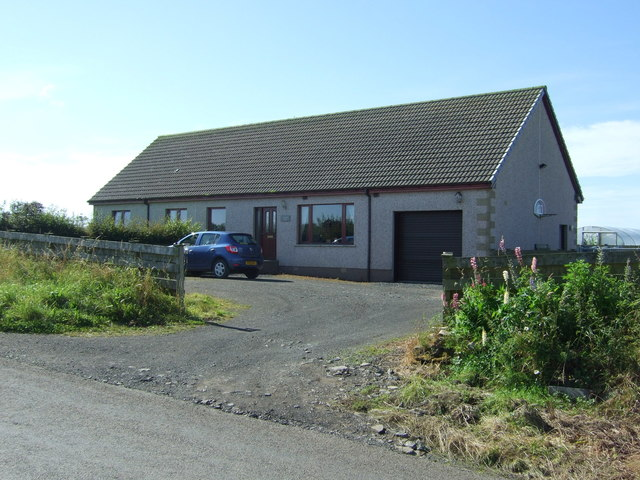
- A house in Gillock

- Location within the Caithness area
- Council area: Highland
- Lieutenancy area: Caithness
- Country: Scotland
- Sovereign state: United Kingdom
- Post town: Wick
- Postcode district: KW1
- Dialling code: 01955
- Police: Scotland
- Fire: Scottish
- Ambulance: Scottish
- UK Parliament: Caithness, Sutherland and Easter Ross
- Scottish Parliament: Caithness, Sutherland and Ross

Gillock is a small village in Caithness, the north part of the Highland council area of Scotland. It is 262 miles north of Edinburgh, situated between the towns of Wick and Thurso. The village is located at grid reference ND210595, on the B874 road.

Gillock comprises around 10 homes, with 9 new homes being sold just outside the village. Allans Of Gillock is a farming tools retailer based in the village, and the local post office is based in Allans. The local primary school is Bower Primary, situated in the village of Bower, approximately three miles north of Gillock. The local high schools are Thurso and Wick High Schools, situated in their respective towns.

The villages of Watten and Halkirk are close to Gillock. The nearest hospital is Caithness General Hospital in Wick, and the nearest large hospital is Raigmore in Inverness. The nearest railway station is Georgemas Junction railway station on the Far North Line.
