= Haimer =

Coordinates: 58.58446°N 3.47550°W

- Location within the Caithness area
- OS grid reference: ND142671
  - Edinburgh: 192.25 mi (309.40 km)
  - London: 507.77 mi (817.18 km)
- Council area: Highland
- Lieutenancy area: Caithness
- Country: Scotland
- Sovereign state: United Kingdom
- Post town: Thurso
- Postcode district: KW14
- Dialling code: 01847
- UK Parliament: Caithness, Sutherland and Easter Ross
- Scottish Parliament: Caithness, Sutherland and Ross

Haimer is a small hamlet in Caithness, Scotland. It is located on a road just off the A836 and consists of several small settlements and farming facilities. Thurso is quite close by, being about a mile away to the west and the suburb of Mount Pleasant is just a short distance away. There are several public facilities including a hotel as part of the settlement and a supermarket in Mount Pleasant.
