= Roster, Caithness =

Coordinates: 58.33937°N 3.25152°W

Roster
- Location within the Caithness area
- OS grid reference: ND268396
- Council area: Highland
- Country: Scotland
- Sovereign state: United Kingdom
- Post town: Occumster
- Postcode district: KW3 6
- Police: Scotland
- Fire: Scottish
- Ambulance: Scottish

Roster is a remote scattered crofting township, in Caithness, Scottish Highlands and is in the Scottish council area of Highland.

Roster is located 2 miles north of the coastal village of Lybster and 1 mile south of Upper Camster.
