= Newport, Caithness =

Village in Caithness, Scotland

Coordinates: 58.20237°N 3.4758°W

Newport: Scottish Gaelic: Am Port Nuadh
- Location within the Caithness area
- OS grid reference: ND133246
- Council area: Highland
- Lieutenancy area: Caithness
- Country: Scotland
- Sovereign state: United Kingdom
- Post town: Berriedale
- Postcode district: KW7 6
- Police: Scotland
- Fire: Scottish
- Ambulance: Scottish
- UK Parliament: Caithness, Sutherland and Easter Ross
- Scottish Parliament: Caithness, Sutherland and Ross

Newport is a small remote village on the eastern shore of Caithness, Scottish Highlands and is in the Scottish council area of Highland.

Ramscraig lies 1 mile northeast along the A9 road coast road, with Dunbeath lying 2 miles further north. Berriedale is directly south of the village.
