= Brabsterdorran =

Coordinates: 58.529°N 3.324°W

- Location within the Caithness area
- OS grid reference: ND2360
- Council area: Highland
- Country: Scotland
- Sovereign state: United Kingdom
- Police: Scotland
- Fire: Scottish
- Ambulance: Scottish

Brabsterdorran is an area of the civil parish of Bower in Highland, Scotland. Buildings include Bower Community Hall and the Old Free Church Manse, previously derelict, but now restored and lived in by the Irwin family. The manse was featured on BBC Radio Scotland's "A House with a Past" programme. Notable residents have included David Sinclair of Brabsterdorran, who fought for the Jacobite cause in the Battle of Sheriffmuir.

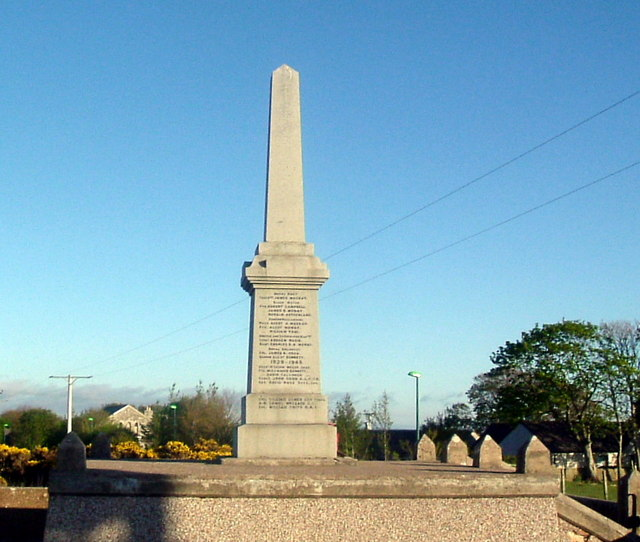
War memorial at Brabsterdorran
