= Buldoo =

Hamlet in Caithness, Scotland

Coordinates: 58.5802°N 3.7244°W

Buldoo: Scottish Gaelic: Bul Dubh
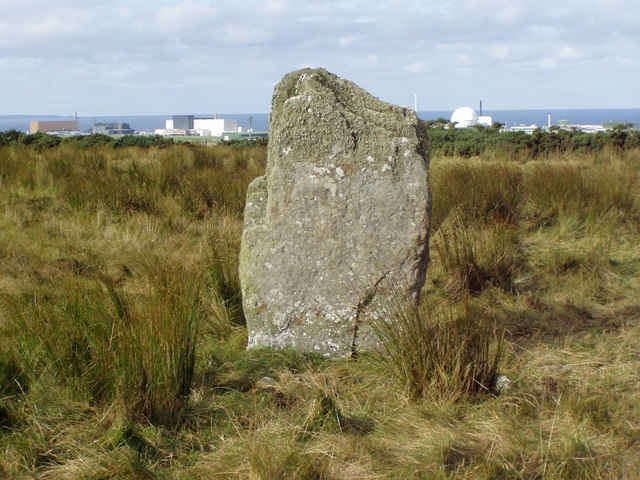
- Standing Stone at the village of Buldoo, next to Dounreay. The Standing Stone is over 5000 years old, and is many of this type in the area.

- Location within the Caithness area
- OS grid reference: NC991666
- Council area: Highland
- Lieutenancy area: Caithness
- Country: Scotland
- Sovereign state: United Kingdom
- Postcode district: KW14 7
- Police: Scotland
- Fire: Scottish
- Ambulance: Scottish
- UK Parliament: Caithness, Sutherland and Easter Ross
- Scottish Parliament: Caithness, Sutherland and Ross

Buldoo (Scottish Gaelic:) in the far north of Scotland, is a small hamlet 0.5 miles south of Dounreay in Thurso, Caithness, Scottish Highlands and is in the Scottish council area of Highland.
