= Houstry =

Village in Caithness, Scotland

Coordinates: 58.29543°N 3.44386°W

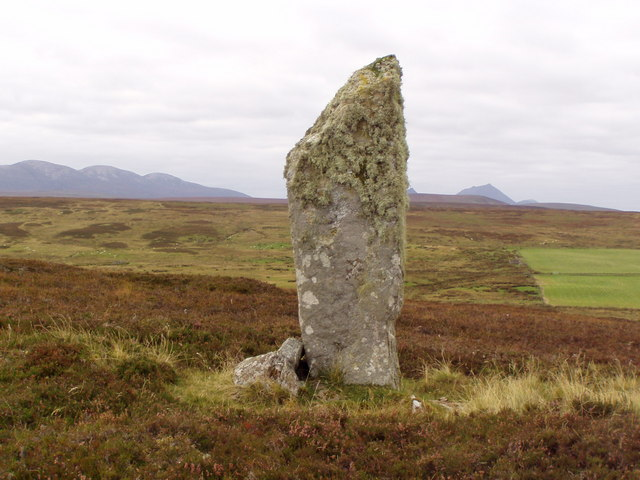
- Standing stone near Houstry.

- Location within the Caithness area
- OS grid reference: ND154350
- Council area: Highland
- Country: Scotland
- Sovereign state: United Kingdom
- Post town: Thurso
- Postcode district: KW6 6
- Dialling code: 01955
- Police: Scotland
- Fire: Scottish
- Ambulance: Scottish
- UK Parliament: Caithness, Sutherland and Easter Ross
- Scottish Parliament: Caithness, Sutherland and Ross

Houstry is a scattered crofting village, in the east coast of Dunbeath, Caithness, Scottish Highlands and is in the Scottish council area of Highland. A large wind farm has been built next to the village.
