= Balnabruich =

Coordinates: 58.24242°N 3.44377°W

Balnabruich: Scottish Gaelic: Baile na Bruaich
- Location within the Caithness area
- OS grid reference: ND153290
- Council area: Highland
- Country: Scotland
- Sovereign state: United Kingdom
- Postcode district: KW6 6
- Police: Scotland
- Fire: Scottish
- Ambulance: Scottish

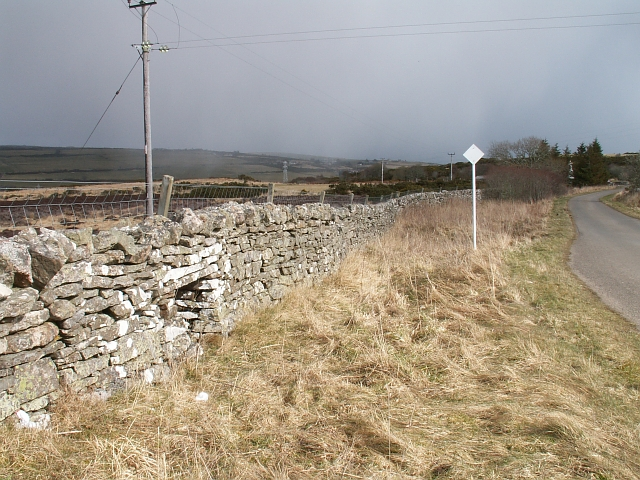
Drystone dyke in Balnabruich.

Balnabruich (from Scottish Gaelic Baile na Bruaich) is a small hamlet on the east coast of Scotland, close to Dunbeath, Caithness, Scottish Highlands and is in the Scottish council area of Highland.
