= Achingills =

Coordinates: 58.5475°N 3.4409°W

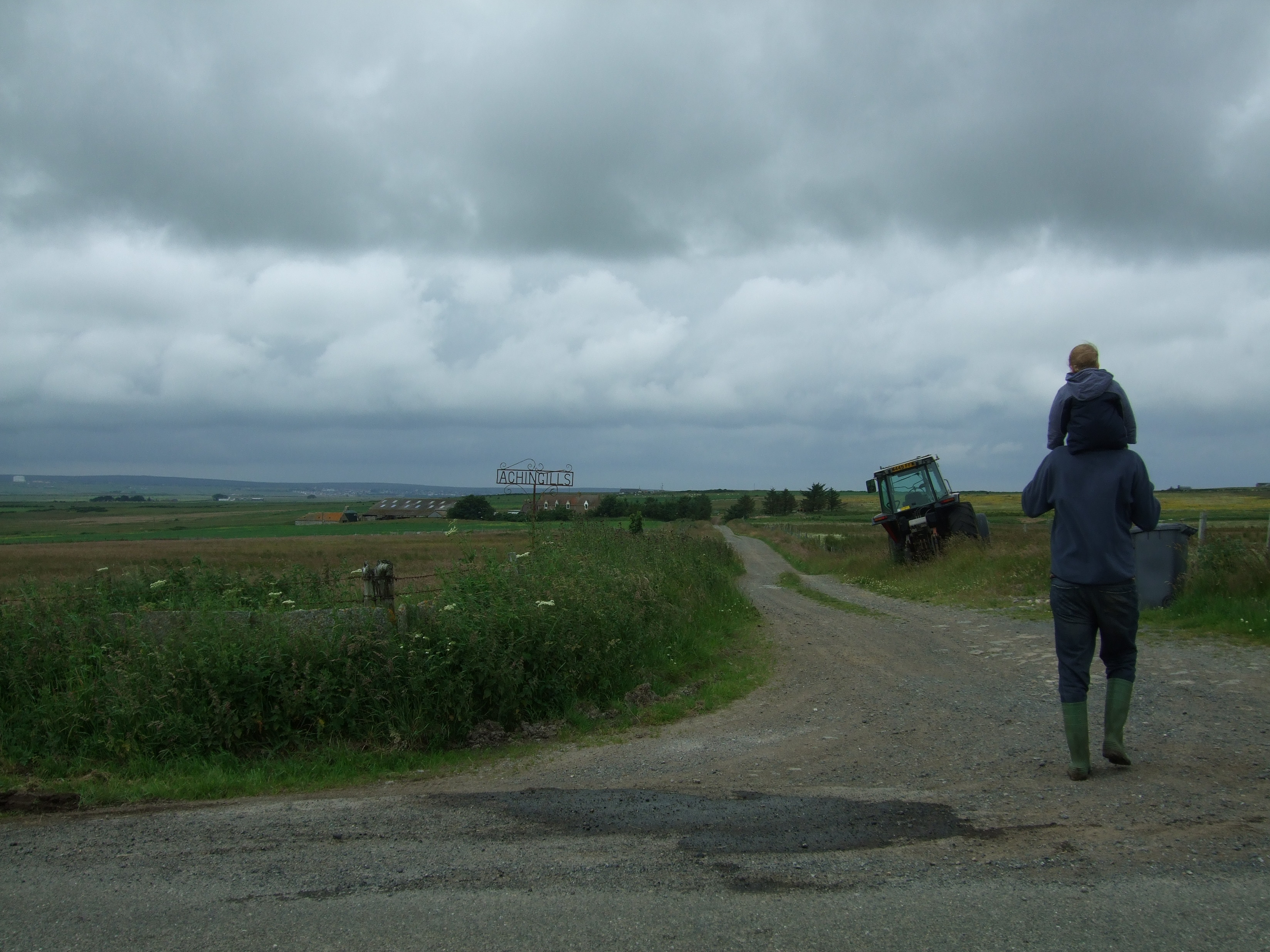
- Achingills farm, taken facing north towards Thurso

- Location within the Caithness area
- OS grid reference: ND178629
- Council area: Highland
- Country: Scotland
- Sovereign state: United Kingdom
- Postcode district: KW14 8
- Police: Scotland
- Fire: Scottish
- Ambulance: Scottish
- UK Parliament: Caithness, Sutherland and Easter Ross
- Scottish Parliament: Caithness, Sutherland and Ross

Achingills (Gaelic: ) is a small hamlet in Halkirk, Caithness within Highland region and is in the Scottish council area of the Highland. Scotland.

Achingills Farm is home to the Williamson family who have farmed it since 1988.
