= Newlands of Geise =

Hamlet in Caithness, Scotland

Coordinates: 58.57917°N 3.54377°W

Newlands of Geise: Scots: Newlands o Geise
- Location within the Caithness area
- OS grid reference: ND103667
- Council area: Highland
- Country: Scotland
- Sovereign state: United Kingdom
- Post town: Thurso
- Postcode district: KW14 7
- Police: Scotland
- Fire: Scottish
- Ambulance: Scottish
- UK Parliament: Caithness, Sutherland and Easter Ross
- Scottish Parliament: Caithness, Sutherland and Ross

Newlands of Geise is a scattered hamlet. It lies to the south west of Thurso in Caithness in the Scottish Highlands and is in the Scottish council area of Highland.
