= Whiterow =

Coordinates: 58.41732°N 3.09514°W

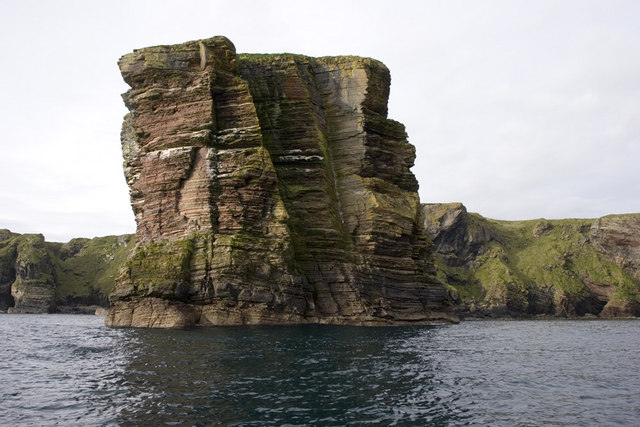
- South Stack and Kettle Geo South Stack from the sea looking towards Kettle Geo, not far from Whiterow

- Location within the Caithness area
- OS grid reference: ND361481
- Council area: Highland
- Country: Scotland
- Sovereign state: United Kingdom
- Post town: Wick
- Postcode district: KW1 5
- Police: Scotland
- Fire: Scottish
- Ambulance: Scottish

Whiterow is a small coastal hamlet, on the east coast of Caithness, lying one mile southeast of Wick, Scottish Highlands. It is in the Scottish council area of Highland, and lies within the Civil Parish of Wick.
