= Weydale =

Coordinates: 58.56487°N 3.4926°W

Weydale: Scottish Gaelic: Gleann a' Saoid
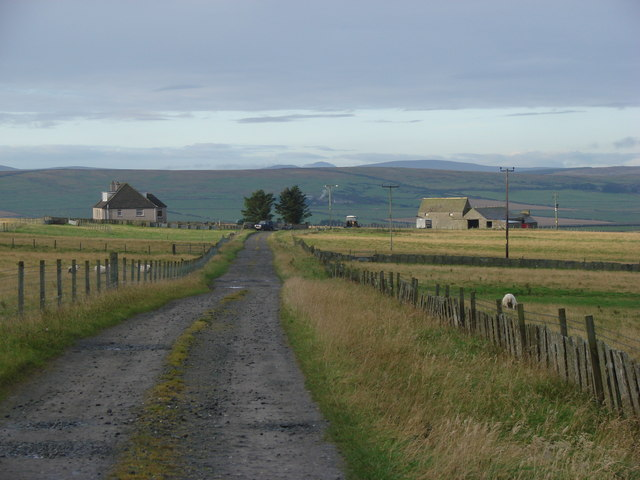
- Old track leading to Weydale

- Location within the Caithness area
- OS grid reference: ND132650
- Council area: Highland
- Country: Scotland
- Sovereign state: United Kingdom
- Post town: Thurso
- Postcode district: KW14 8
- Police: Scotland
- Fire: Scottish
- Ambulance: Scottish

Weydale (Scottish Gaelic: valley of the way) is a remote scattered crofting settlement, lying 3 miles southeast of Thurso, Caithness, Scottish Highlands and is in the Scottish council area of Highland.

== Features ==
Despite a sparse population Weydale covers a large area of the farming land south-east of Thurso, which is mainly used for grazing of livestock. Within the area are four former flagstone quarries, which despite no longer producing the stones are now noted for the excellent preservation of the fossil fish Osteolepis.

Weydale was previously served by a small primary school, which was created more for a local gypsy settlement, who, up until the early 1900s, were banned from entering Thurso and settled in the area.

The former school and the quarries are part of a number of sites and buildings within Weydale that hold some historical significance, however a more modern bungalow, "Stoneybank", made the news when originally built as at that time its west-facing side contained Britain's largest single-pane window. The window has since been removed.

The area did make the news again in the late 1990s when the Bomb Disposal Unit undertook a controlled explosion at Bulliemore Farm, following the find of a World War II weapons and explosives store left over by the Auxiliary Unit which trained in the area.
