= Clyth =

Village in the Scottish Highlands

Coordinates: 58.320°N 3.217°W

- Location within the Caithness area
- OS grid reference: ND2837
- Civil parish: Latheron
- Council area: Highland
- Lieutenancy area: Caithness
- Country: Scotland
- Sovereign state: United Kingdom
- Post town: LYBSTER
- Postcode district: KW3
- Dialling code: 01593
- Police: Scotland
- Fire: Scottish
- Ambulance: Scottish
- UK Parliament: Caithness, Sutherland and Easter Ross
- Scottish Parliament: Caithness, Sutherland and Ross

Clyth is a remote scattered coastal crofting village, in eastern Caithness, Scottish Highlands and is in the Scottish council area of Highland.

Upper Clyth, Clyth Mains, Mid Clyth, Hill of Mid Clyth, West Clyth and East Clyth are all associated with Clyth. Clyth is situated eight miles (thirteen kilometres) south of Wick. The village of Lybster lies three miles (five kilometres) southwest.

In April 1855 disaster struck East Clyth. A boat manned by thirteen young men from the village aged from twelve to nineteen years was swamped in deep water, and they all drowned.

The Hill o' Many Stanes is at Mid Clyth. It has about 200 upright stones, set out in rows on the hillside. probably erected about 4,000 years ago.
