= Achreamie =

Coordinates: 58.576°N 3.690°W

- Town
- Location within the Caithness area
- OS grid reference: ND018666
- Council area: Highland
- Lieutenancy area: Caithness
- Country: Scotland
- Sovereign state: United Kingdom
- Post town: Thurso
- Postcode district: KW14
- Dialling code: 01847
- Police: Scotland
- Fire: Scottish
- Ambulance: Scottish
- UK Parliament: Caithness, Sutherland and Easter Ross
- Scottish Parliament: Caithness, Sutherland and Ross

Achreamie is a village in the Scottish council area of Highland. Achreamie is about 6 miles (9.7 km) west of Thurso and is less than two miles from the Nuclear Power Development Establishment at Dounreay.
