= Upper Lybster =

Coordinates: 58.31848°N 3.28362°W

- Location within the Caithness area
- OS grid reference: ND249373
- Council area: Highland
- Country: Scotland
- Sovereign state: United Kingdom
- Post town: Lybster
- Postcode district: KW3 6
- Police: Scotland
- Fire: Scottish
- Ambulance: Scottish

Upper Lybster is a scattered and crofting village, situated 2 miles north of Lybster, in eastern Caithness, Scottish Highlands and is in the Scottish council area of Highland.

== Gallery ==
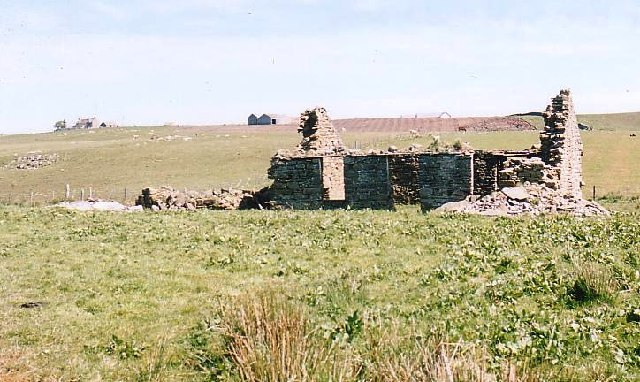
Lower Smerlie. Cuigs croft lower Smerlie. Typical croft land that once had many small crofts like this one.

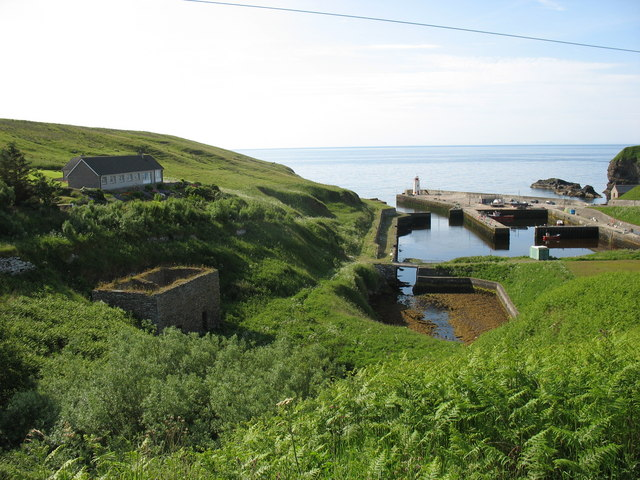
Lybster Harbour

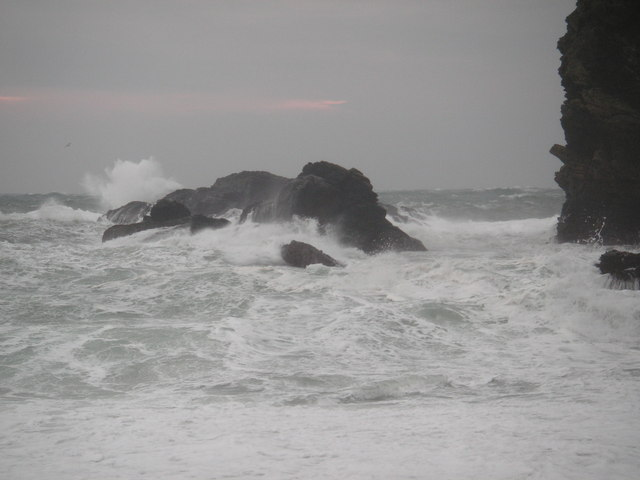
High seas at Lybster Harbour

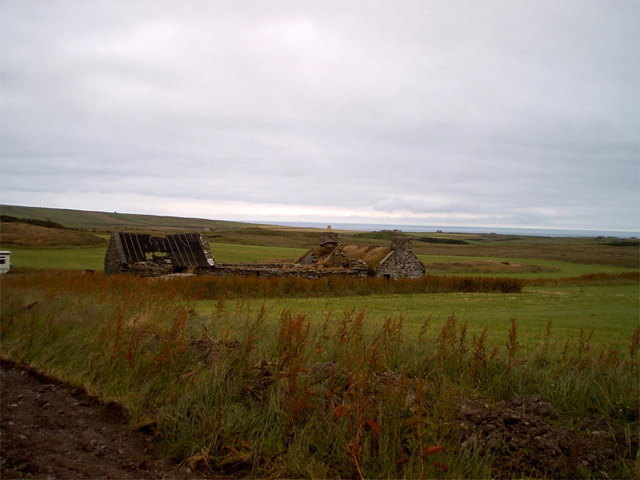
The Old Mill, Clashnaharribeg, Upper Lybster. Derelict Croft House and outbuildings

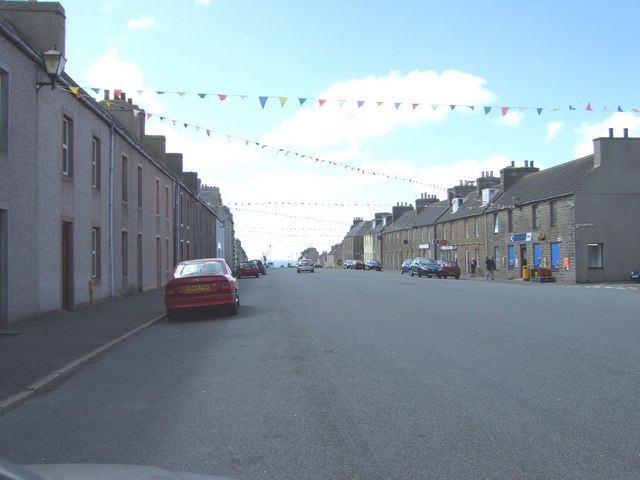
Gray's Place, Lybster The wide main street of this C19th 'planned village'. No mean feat to stretch bunting diagonally across it!

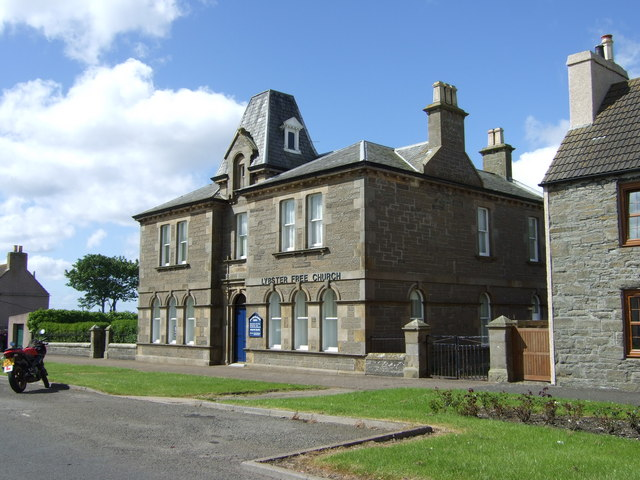
Lybster Free Church

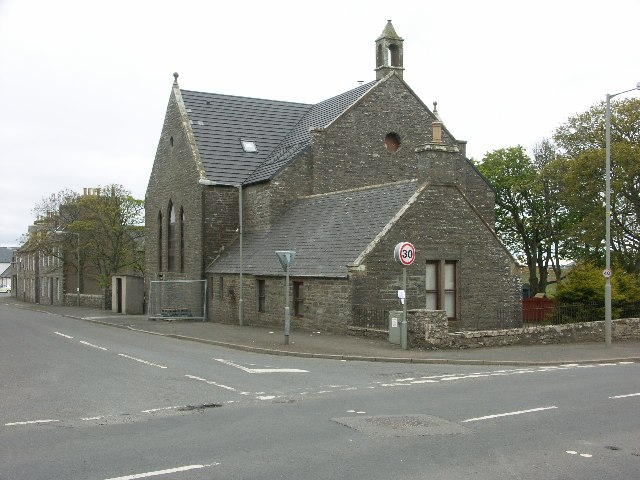
Lybster old Free Church.

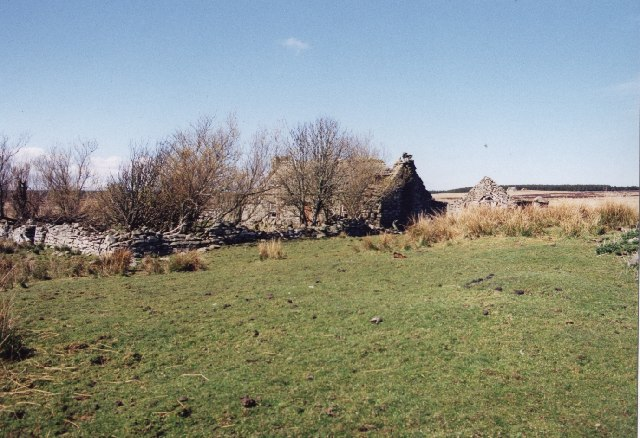
Ruins of croft house, Upper Smerlie. This old house was occupied up until the 1980s and was not long unoccupied when struck by lightning. The land around has many similar such old croft houses scattered around.

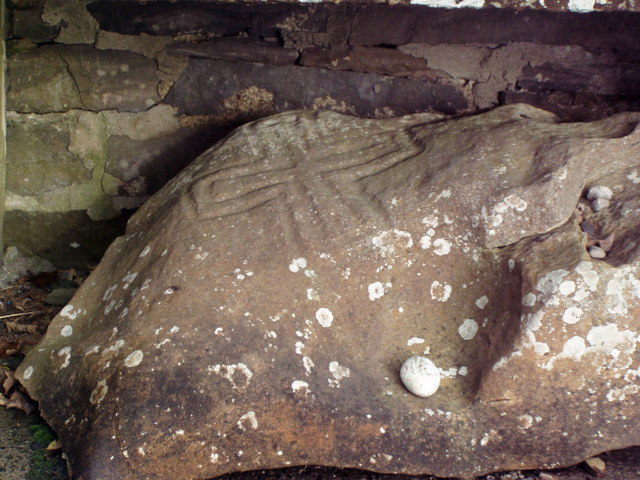
Early Christian Incised Cross in shelter by church

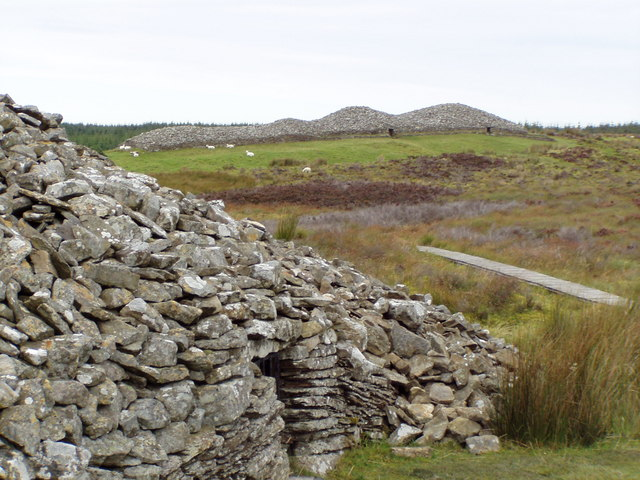
Long Cairn from Round Cairn
