= Swiney =

Coordinates: 58.29911°N 3.28421°W

- Location within the Caithness area
- OS grid reference: ND248352
- Council area: Highland
- Country: Scotland
- Sovereign state: United Kingdom
- Post town: Lybster
- Postcode district: KW3 6
- Police: Scotland
- Fire: Scottish
- Ambulance: Scottish

Swiney is a small village on the east coast of Scotland, 1 mile (1.6 km) west of Lybster along the A99 road, in Caithness, Scottish Highlands and is in the Scottish council area of Highland.
