= Roadside, Caithness =

Coordinates: 58.52723°N 3.45957°W

Roadside
- Location within the Caithness area
- OS grid reference: ND150608
- Council area: Highland
- Country: Scotland
- Sovereign state: United Kingdom
- Post town: Halkirk
- Postcode district: KW12 6
- Police: Scotland
- Fire: Scottish
- Ambulance: Scottish

Roadside is a hamlet, located at the junction of the A9 trunk road and the B874, 1 mile south of Sordale in Caithness, Scottish Highlands and is in the Scottish council area of Highland.
