= Papigoe =

Hamlet in Caithness, Scotland

Coordinates: 58.44779°N 3.06161°W

Papigoe: Scots: Papigoe
- Location within the Caithness area
- Population: 50
- OS grid reference: ND381515
- Council area: Highland
- Country: Scotland
- Sovereign state: United Kingdom
- Post town: KW1 4 / KW1 5
- Postcode district: KW1 4
- Dialling code: 01955 60
- Police: Scotland
- Fire: Scottish
- Ambulance: Scottish
- UK Parliament: Caithness, Sutherland and Easter Ross
- Scottish Parliament: Caithness, Sutherland and Ross

Papigoe is a hamlet on the east coast of Caithness, at the head of Broad Haven Bay in the Scottish Highlands and is in the Scottish council area of Highland.
