= Staxigoe =

Coordinates: 58.45542°N 3.05993°W

Staxigoe: Scottish Gaelic: Staxigoe; Scots: Staxigoe
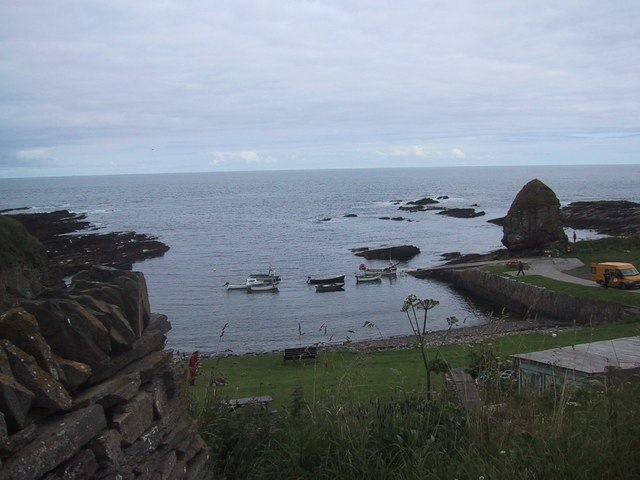

- Location within the Caithness area
- Population: 120
- OS grid reference: ND382523
- Council area: Highland
- Country: Scotland
- Sovereign state: United Kingdom
- Post town: Wick
- Postcode district: KW1 4
- Dialling code: 01955 60
- Police: Scotland
- Fire: Scottish
- Ambulance: Scottish

Staxigoe is a former fishing village, located 2 miles east of Wick on the north-eastern coast of the former county of Caithness, Scottish Highlands and is in the Scottish council area of Highland. Its name, which is of Old Norse origin, literally means 'the inlet of the stack', deriving from stakkr 'stack' and gjá 'inlet'. It was once the largest herring salting station in Europe, but its fishing industry went into decline with the construction of a larger port in central Wick.
