= Shebster =

Hamlet in Caithness, Scotland

Coordinates: 58.55097°N 3.69372°W

Shebster: Scottish Gaelic: Siabost
- Location within the Caithness area
- OS grid reference: ND015637
- Council area: Highland
- Lieutenancy area: Caithness
- Country: Scotland
- Sovereign state: United Kingdom
- Post town: Thurso
- Postcode district: KW14 7
- Police: Scotland
- Fire: Scottish
- Ambulance: Scottish
- UK Parliament: Caithness, Sutherland and Easter Ross
- Scottish Parliament: Caithness, Sutherland and Ross

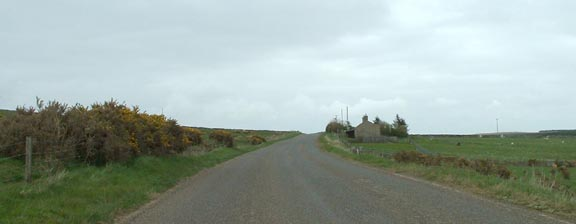
Approach to Shebster

Shebster is a small remote hamlet, which lies 7 miles southwest of Thurso, in northern Caithness, Scottish Highlands and is in the Scottish council area of Highland. The Shubster area is known for its archaeological sites.
