= Upper Camster =

Coordinates: 58.35509°N 3.26174°W

- Location within the Caithness area
- OS grid reference: ND262414
- Council area: Highland
- Country: Scotland
- Sovereign state: United Kingdom
- Postcode district: KW3 6
- Police: Scotland
- Fire: Scottish
- Ambulance: Scottish

Upper Camster is a small hamlet, which lies at the source of the Camster Burn, 4 miles north of Lybster, in Caithness, Scottish Highlands and is in the Scottish council area of Highland.

The Grey Cairns of Camster are two large Neolithic chambered cairns located about quarter of a mile north of Upper Camster. The cairns, which are considered to be examples of the Orkney-Cromarty type of chambered cairn, were constructed in the third or fourth millennium BC in a desolate stretch of boggy peat-covered moorland in the Flow Country of Caithness.

== Gallery ==
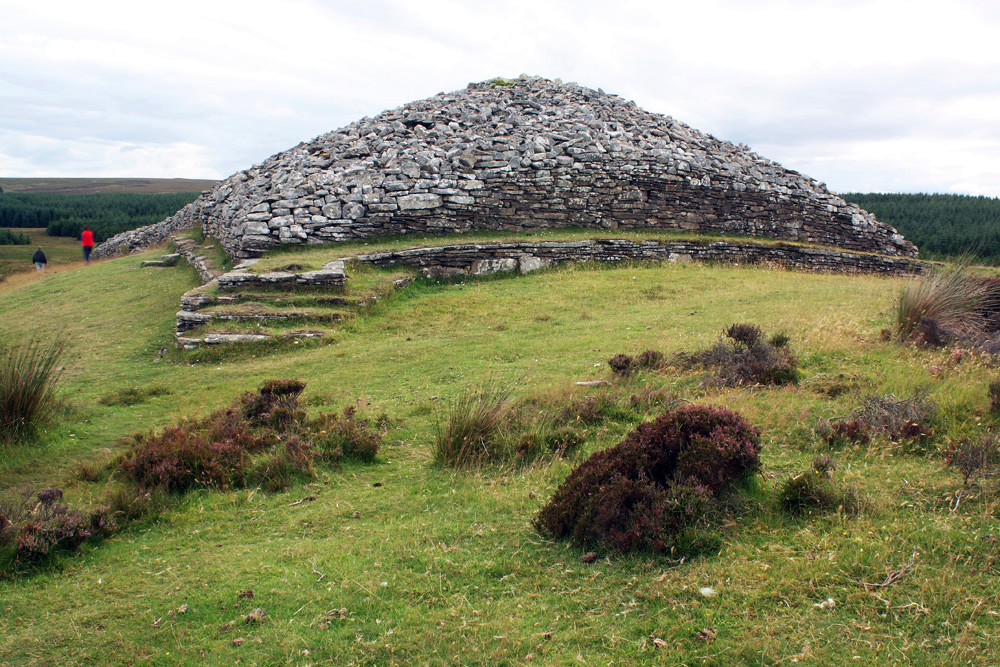
Camster Long Cairn, Upper Camster

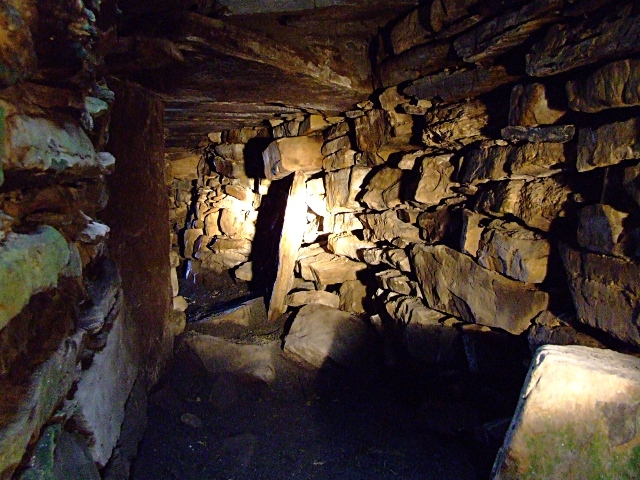
Burial chamber inside Camster Long.

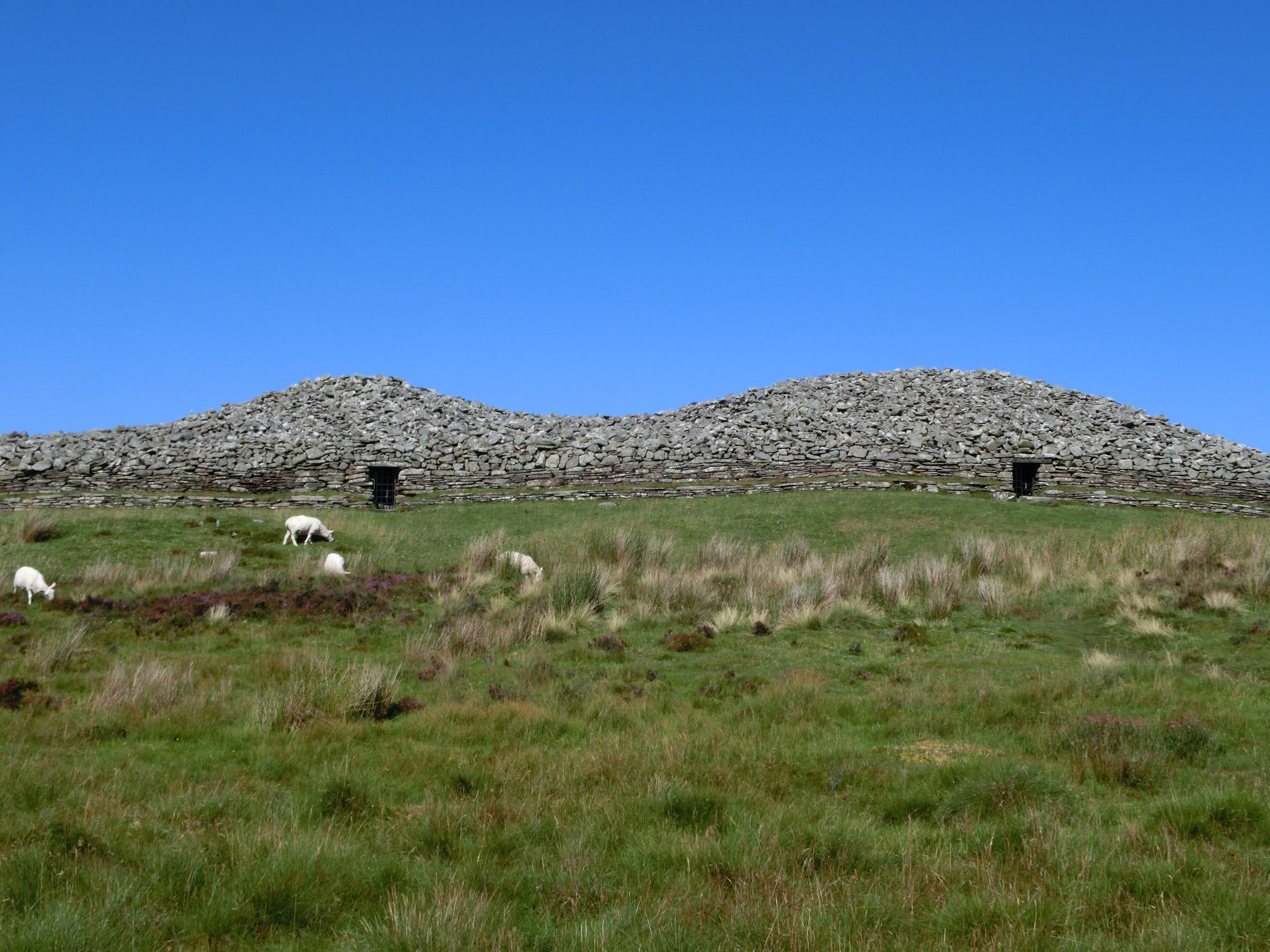
Camster Cairns.

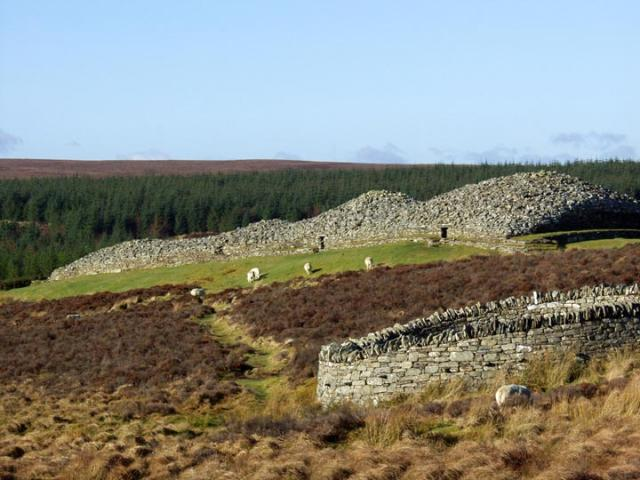
The Grey Cairns of Camster. These cairns are open to the public.

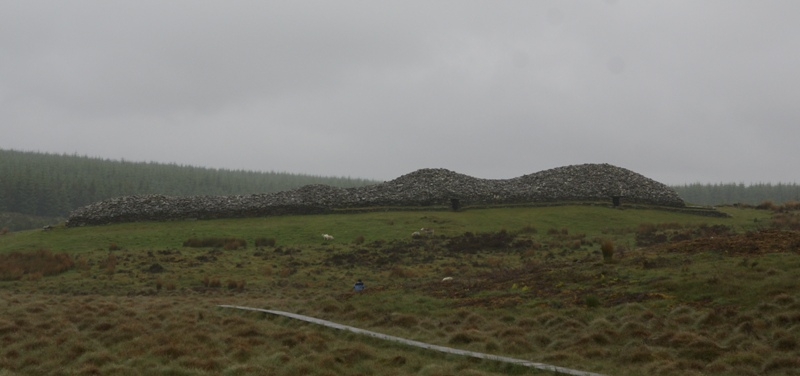
Grey Cairns of Camster, Caithness, Scotland - Camster Long Cairn, exterior

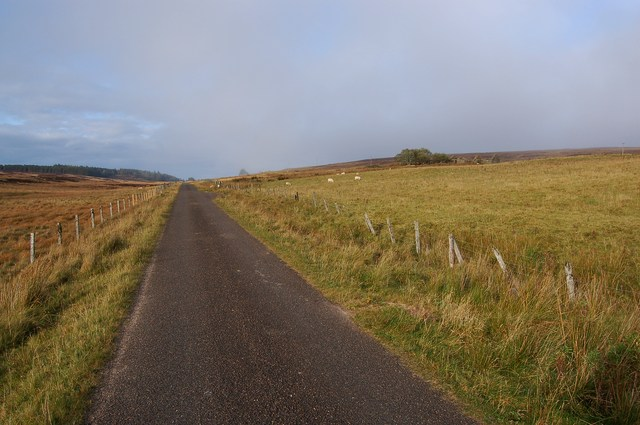
Remote road in the flow country
