= Reaster =

Village in Caithness Highland, Scotland

Coordinates: 58°34′14″N 3°16′21″W

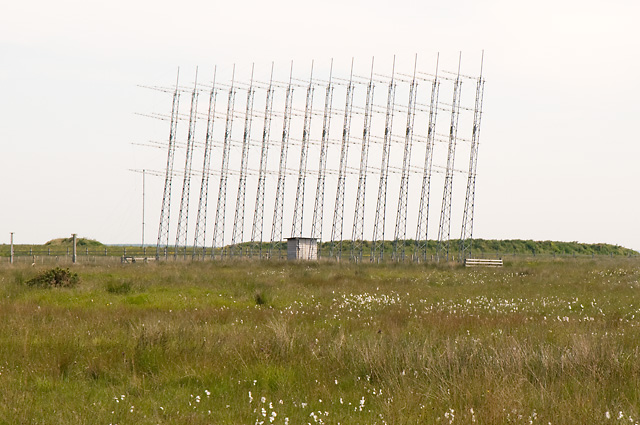
Antennas at Former Radio Station near Reaster.

Reaster is a settlement in the civil parish of Bower, Caithness in the Scottish Highlands. It is near to the site of a former GCHQ monitoring station, which was decommissioned in 1978.
