= Latheronwheel =

Coordinates: 58.27754°N 3.37424°W

Latheronwheel: Scottish Gaelic: Latharn a' Phuill
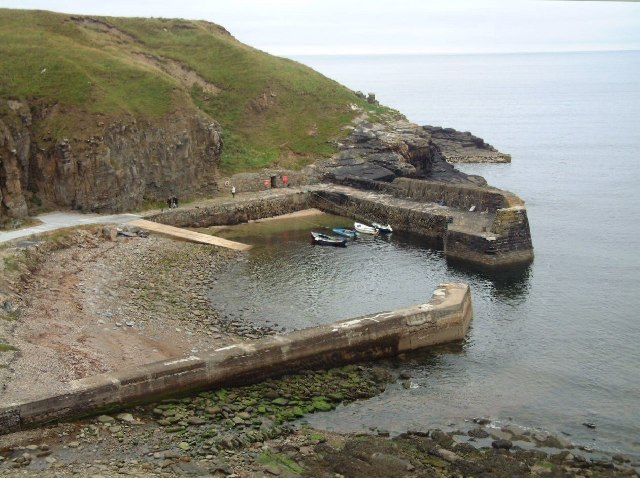
- Latheronwheel harbour

- Location within the Caithness area
- OS grid reference: ND195329
- Council area: Highland
- Lieutenancy area: Caithness
- Country: Scotland
- Sovereign state: United Kingdom
- Post town: LATHERON
- Postcode district: KW5
- Dialling code: 01593
- Police: Scotland
- Fire: Scottish
- Ambulance: Scottish
- UK Parliament: Caithness, Sutherland and Easter Ross
- Scottish Parliament: Caithness, Sutherland and Ross

Latheronwheel (from Scottish Gaelic Latharn a' Phuill 'muddy place of the pool') is a small village in Caithness, in the Highland area of Scotland.It is 4 miles (6 km) southwest of Lybster on the A9 road to Helmsdale, near the junction with the A99 road to Wick, which lies in the equally small village of Latheron. Dunbeath lies to the south-west and Lybster to the north-east.

The village is at the mouth of a wide valley, through which flows a small river called the Burn of Latheronwheel.

== History ==
The settlement was built on the land of one Captain Dunbar (who had actually wished for it to be called Janetston, after his wife and a stone tablet reflects this on the old hotel). It was a planned settlement, begun in 1835 with the building of a hotel (then known as 'Dunbar's Hotel' but today as 'The Blends' - due to its proprietor in the 1890s penchant for blending whisky from stills of dubious legality). In the beginning, tenants of the settlement were allocated 2 acres (8,100 m^{2}) and the right to fish from the harbour.

The harbour was constructed around 1840, with a small lighthouse (soon disused) built on the southern headland. The nearby Latheronwheel harbour bridge is much older, dating to the 1720s and was the crossing for the old coast road. The bridge is open to pedestrians.

At one time the harbour was the home of 50 boats although few now remain. Initially salmon was caught, but this gave way to herring. As the herring trade became more concentrated in larger ports, such as Wick, in the years before the First World War, the catch and the number of vessels in use in Latheronwheel declined:

Fishery Statistics

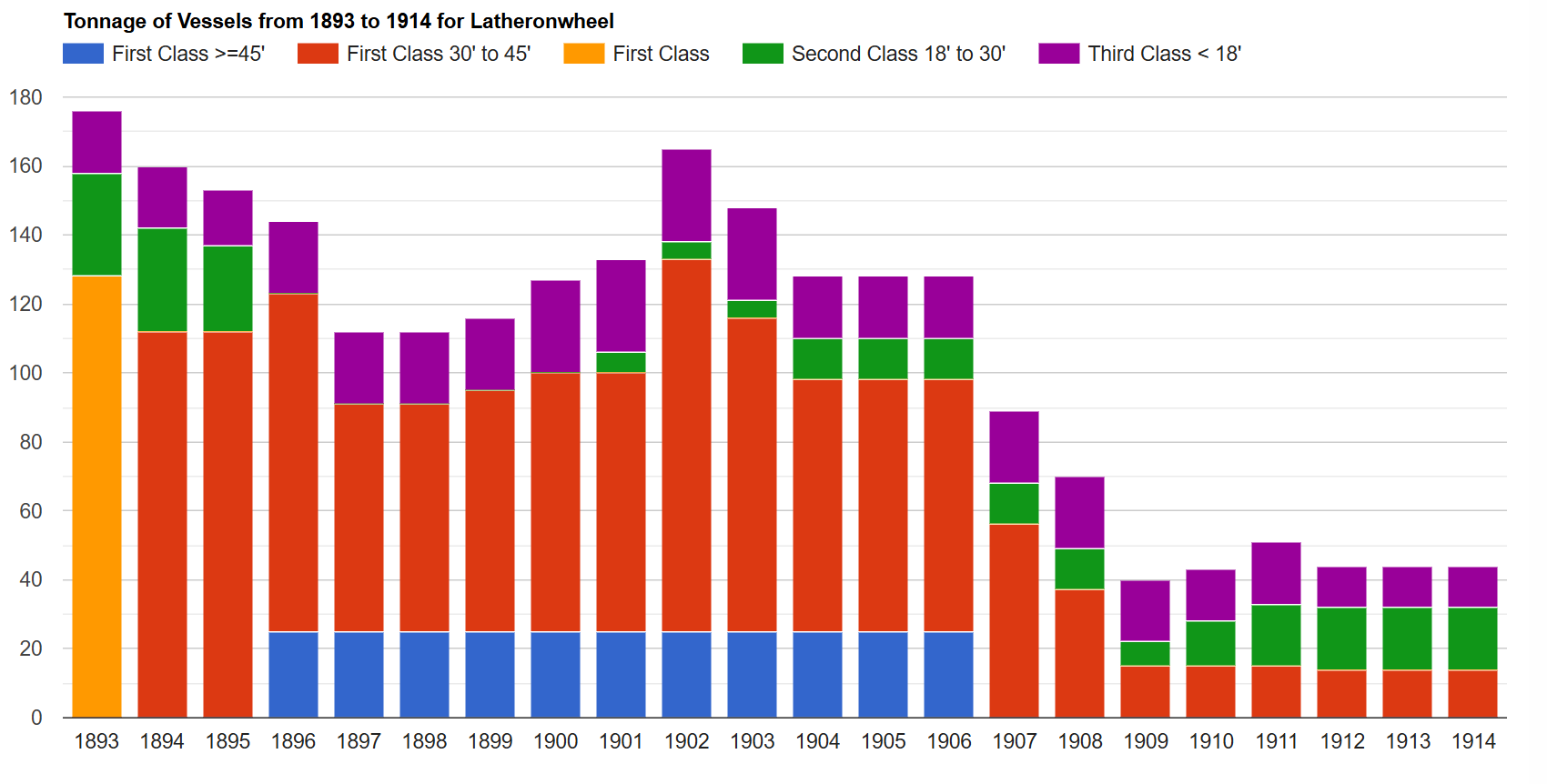
Tonnage of vessels

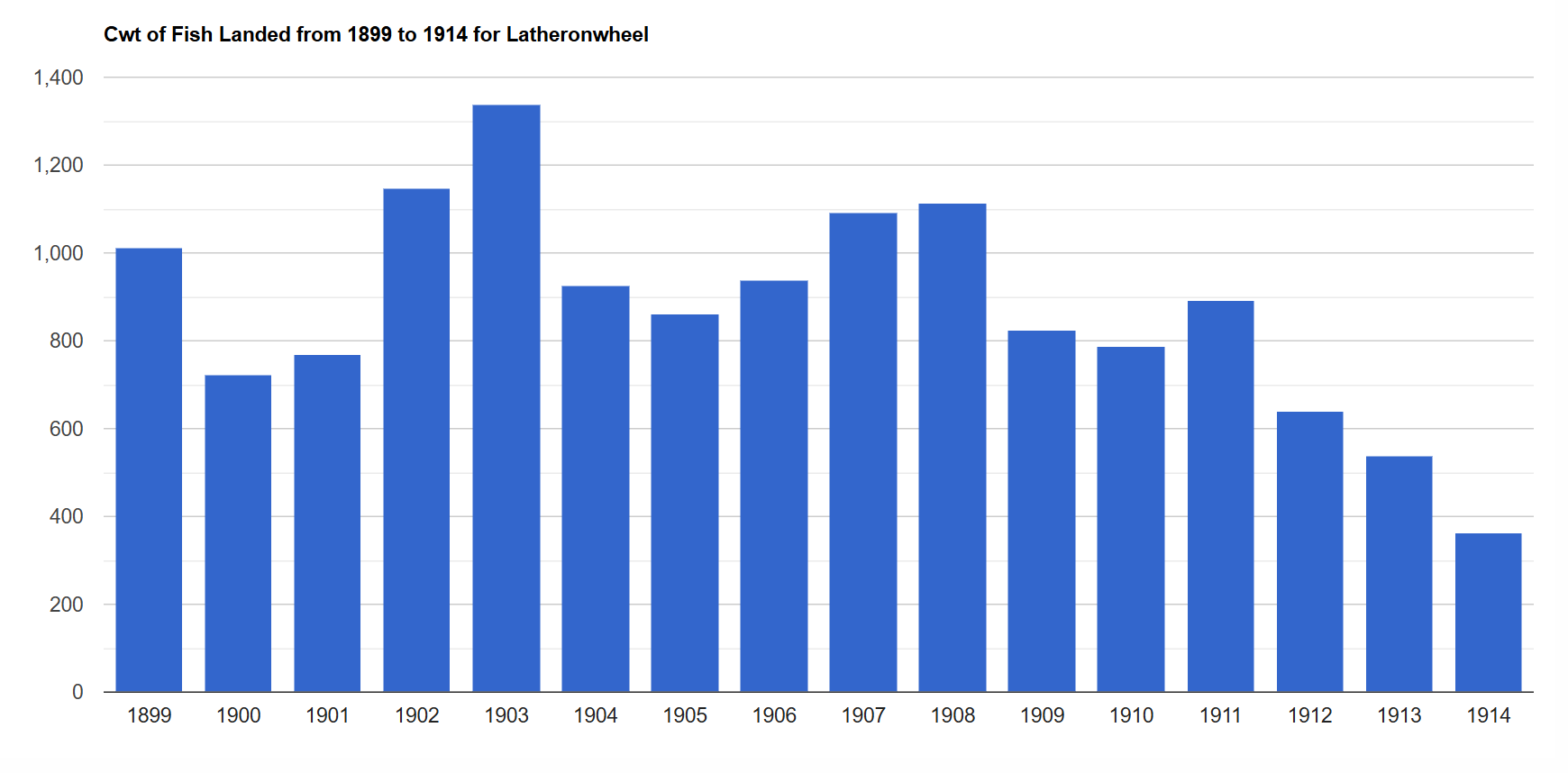
Cwt of fish landed

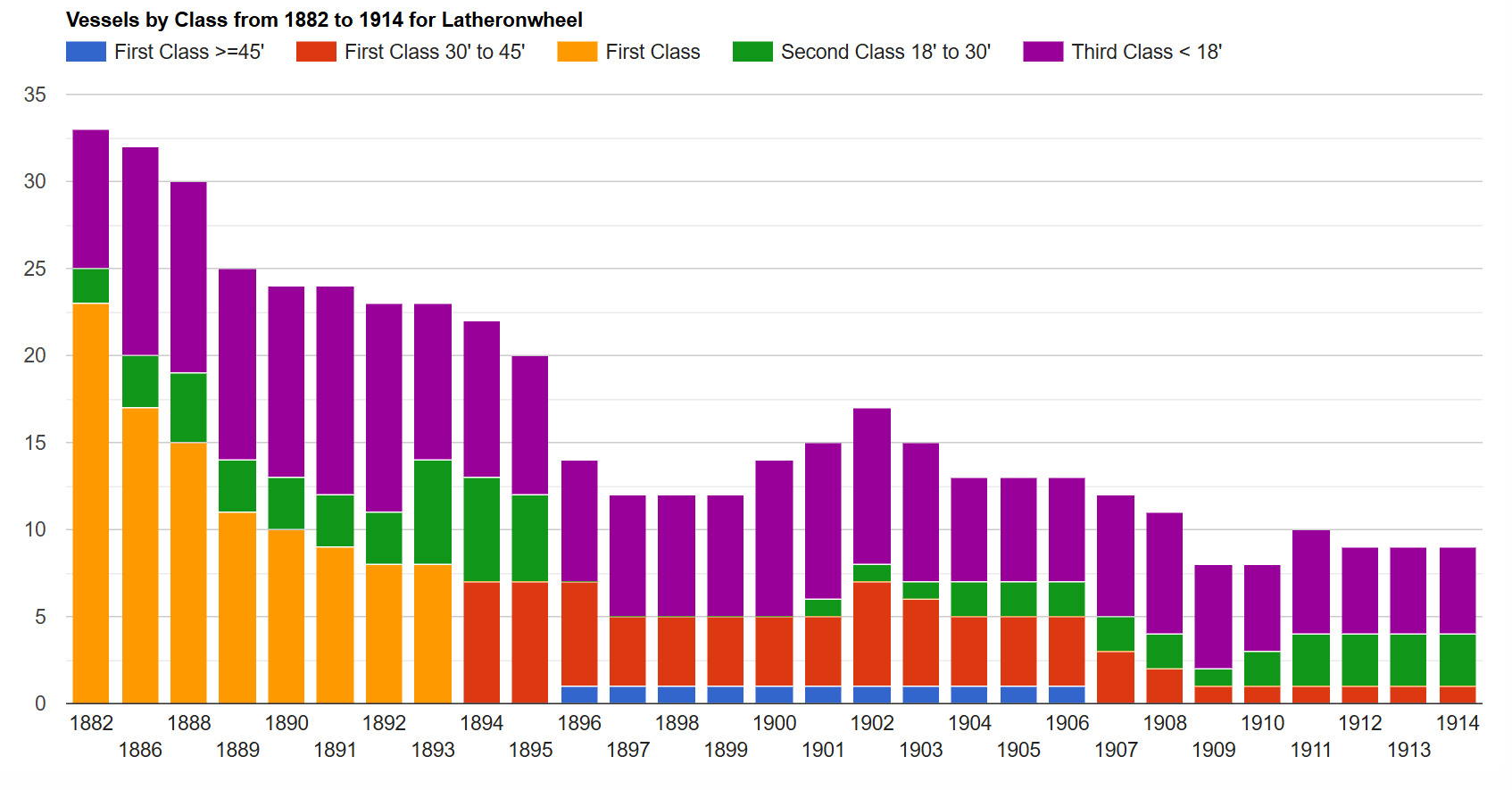
Vessels by class

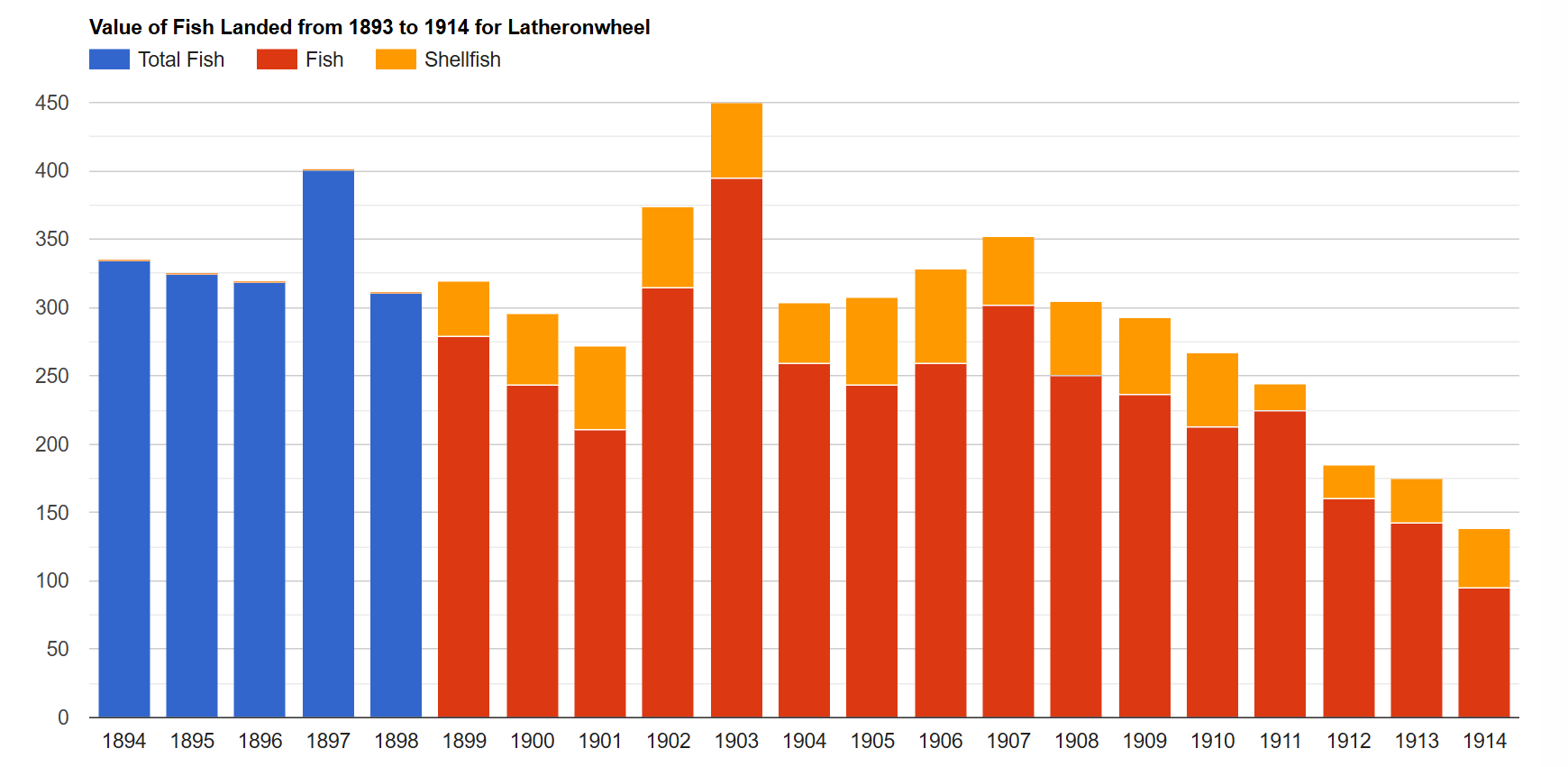
Value (£] of fish landed

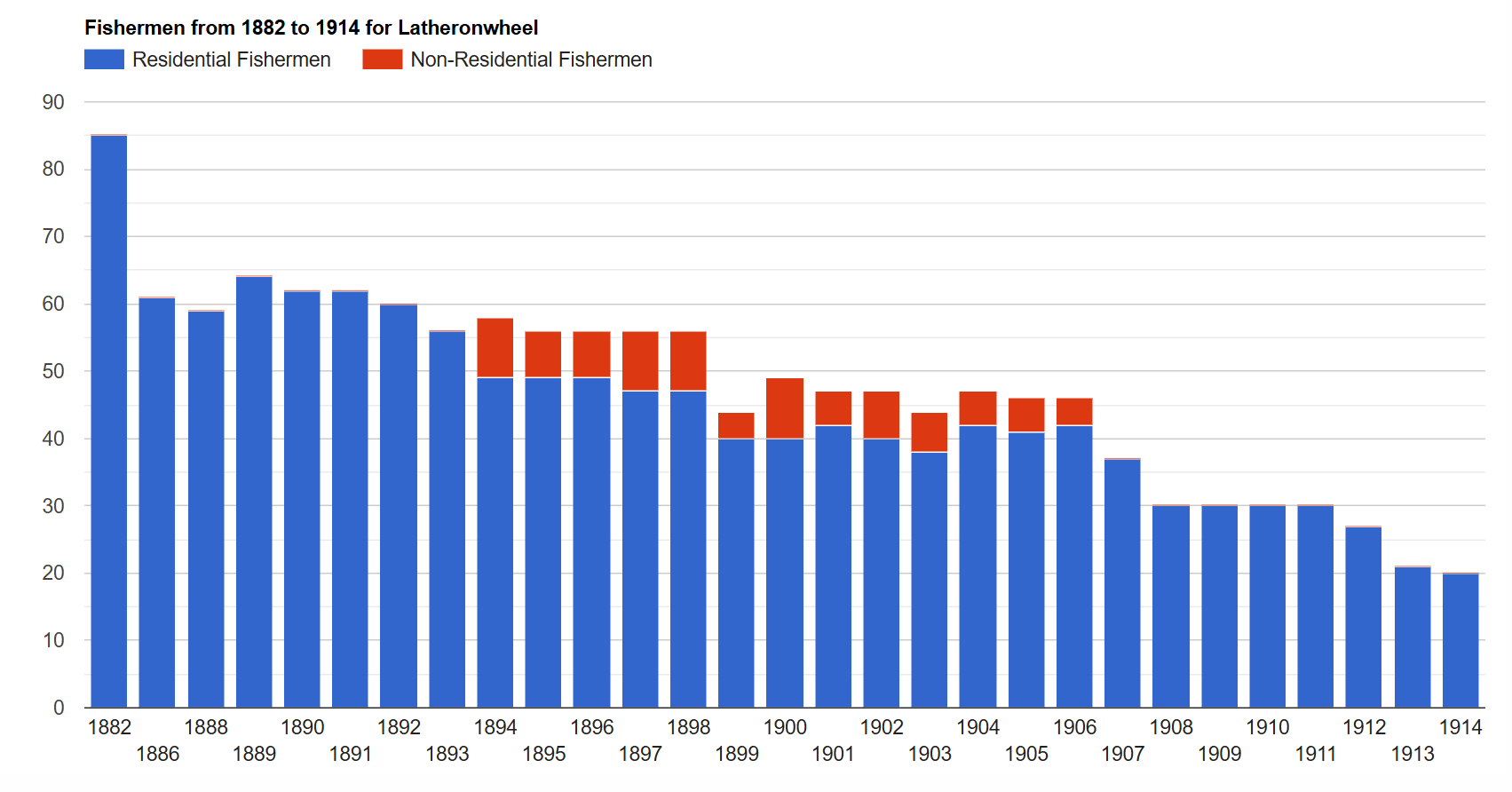
Fishermen

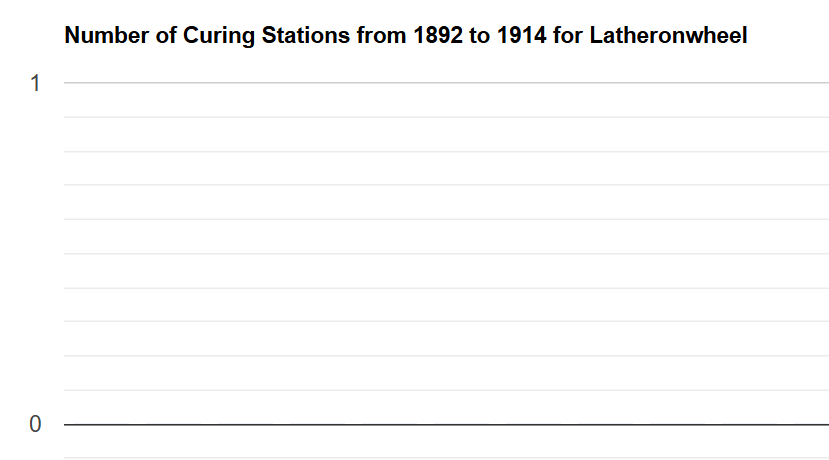
Placeholder - no curing stations
