= Ramscraig =

Coordinates: 58.22168°N 3.45949°W

- Location within the Caithness area
- OS grid reference: ND143268
- Council area: Highland
- Country: Scotland
- Sovereign state: United Kingdom
- Post town: Dunbeath
- Postcode district: KW6 6
- Police: Scotland
- Fire: Scottish
- Ambulance: Scottish

Ramscraig is a small scattered crofting hamlet, located 2 miles southwest from Dunbeath, in eastern Caithness, Scottish Highlands and is in the Scottish council area of Highland.
