= Hill o' Many Stanes =

Hillside in Mid Clyth, Caithness, in the Highland area of Scotland

Coordinates: 58°19′43″N 3°12′18″W

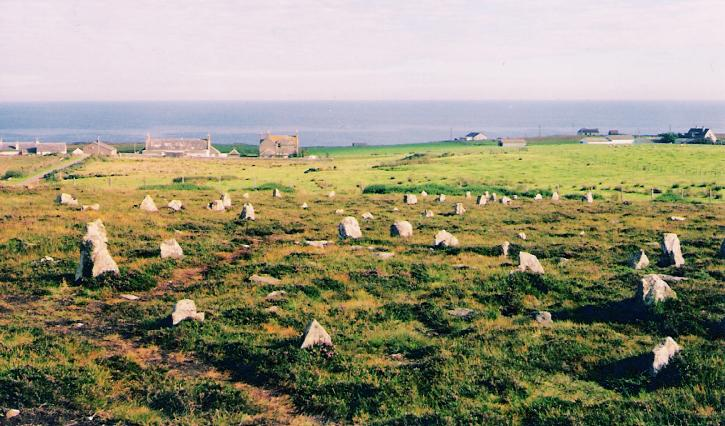
Hill o' Many Stanes

The Hill o' Many Stanes is a hillside at Mid Clyth, about 14 kilometres (8.7 mi) south of Wick, in Caithness, Scotland. It has about 200 upright stones, none more than a metre high, set out in rows running approximately north and south with the incline. The rows are not parallel but set out in a fan-shaped pattern, an arrangement believed to be a relic of Bronze Age times.

From the northern end of the rows, on a clear day, hills along the coast of Banffshire can be seen across the Moray Firth, some 80 kilometres (50 mi) away. If the night sky is clear, the moon, in its most southerly rising position, will be seen over those same hills. In Megalithic Lunar Observatories (Oxford University Press, 1971), Alexander Thom presented evidence that the stone rows were in effect a Bronze Age lunar observatory, tracking lunar movements over a cycle of 18.6 years. However, more than twenty similar stone rows are now known in Caithness and Sutherland, none of which have been linked with astronomical observations.

In Britain, stone rows of this kind are unknown outside Caithness and Sutherland, but similar rows of much taller stones are found in Brittany.

== See also ==
- Celtic calendar
