= Bruan =

Hamlet in Caithness, Scotland

Coordinates: 58.33455°N 3.17358°W

Bruan: Scottish Gaelic: Bruan; Scots: Bruan
- Location within the Caithness area
- OS grid reference: ND313390
- Council area: Highland
- Lieutenancy area: Caithness
- Country: Scotland
- Sovereign state: United Kingdom
- Post town: LYBSTER
- Postcode district: KW2
- Police: Scotland
- Fire: Scottish
- Ambulance: Scottish
- UK Parliament: Caithness, Sutherland and Easter Ross
- Scottish Parliament: Caithness, Sutherland and Ross

Bruan (Scottish Gaelic:) is a small crofting hamlet on the east coast of Scotland in Lybster, Caithness, Highland and is in the Scottish council area of the Highland.

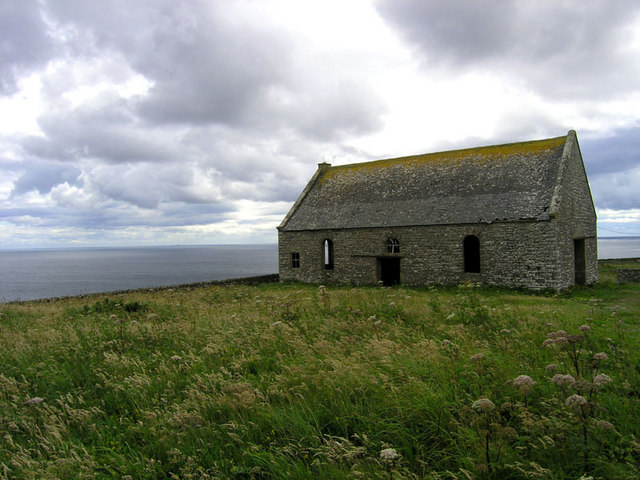
The long-abandoned old kirk at Bruan

In 1845, the minister of Bruan in a famous sermon on the unjust Highland Clearances and the Highland Potato Famine stated:

It is true we often see the wicked enjoy much comfort and worldly ease, and the Godly chastened them every morning; but this is a dreadful rest to the former and a blessed chastisement to the latter.

== Castle Gunn ==
Next to Bruan, and 7 miles south of Wick, on a cliff-side rocky perch, lying parallel to the rocky coast, on the almost inaccessible isolated rock, are the ruins of Castle Gunn, which are considered the first castle of Clan Gunn. At the time the castle was built, Clan Gunn were at the height of their power, and were thought to own the whole of Caithness. Snaekoll Gunnison was reputed to have built the castle. The castle is reputed to have been destroyed by the King of Norway, in revenge. The story goes that the King's daughter married a chief of Clan daughter, although the chief had already married and secreted his wife away in the Castle Gunn. When the second wife arranged to sail from Norway to the castle, the clan arranged for a beacon to be placed on a dangerous rock at Ulbster, so wrecking the ship with all hands on board including the princess being killed. In revenge, the King killed the clan chief, and large number of Clan Gunn were slain.
