= Westerdale, Highland =

Coordinates: 58.44681°N 3.49457°W

Westerdale: Scottish Gaelic: An Dail Shuas
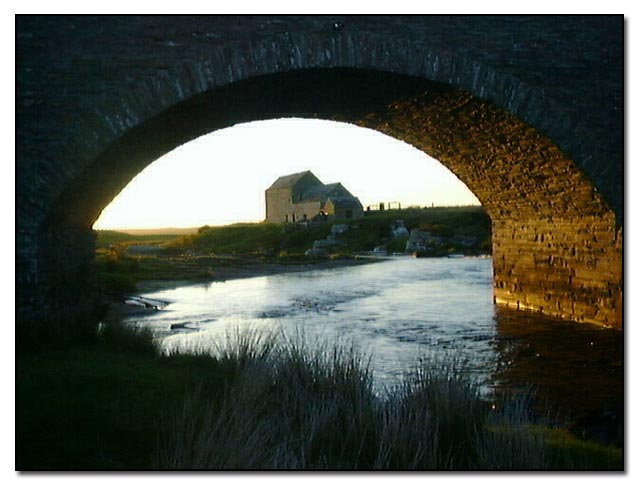
- Dale Mill at Westerdale, seen through Westerdale Bridge

- Location within the Caithness area
- OS grid reference: ND128519
- Council area: Highland
- Lieutenancy area: Caithness
- Country: Scotland
- Sovereign state: United Kingdom
- Post town: HALKIRK
- Postcode district: KW12
- Dialling code: 01847
- Police: Scotland
- Fire: Scottish
- Ambulance: Scottish
- UK Parliament: Caithness, Sutherland and Easter Ross
- Scottish Parliament: Caithness, Sutherland and Ross

Westerdale (Scottish Gaelic: An Dail Shuas) is a scattered crofting village which lies on the River Thurso, located five miles (eight kilometres) directly south of Halkirk, in Caithness, Highland, Scotland. The B870 road passes through the village.

The 14th century Dirlot Castle is located three miles (five kilometres) south of the village, and was the stronghold of the Sutherlands, Cheynes, Gunns and Mackays throughout its history.
