= Grey Cairns of Camster =

Chambered cairns in Scotland

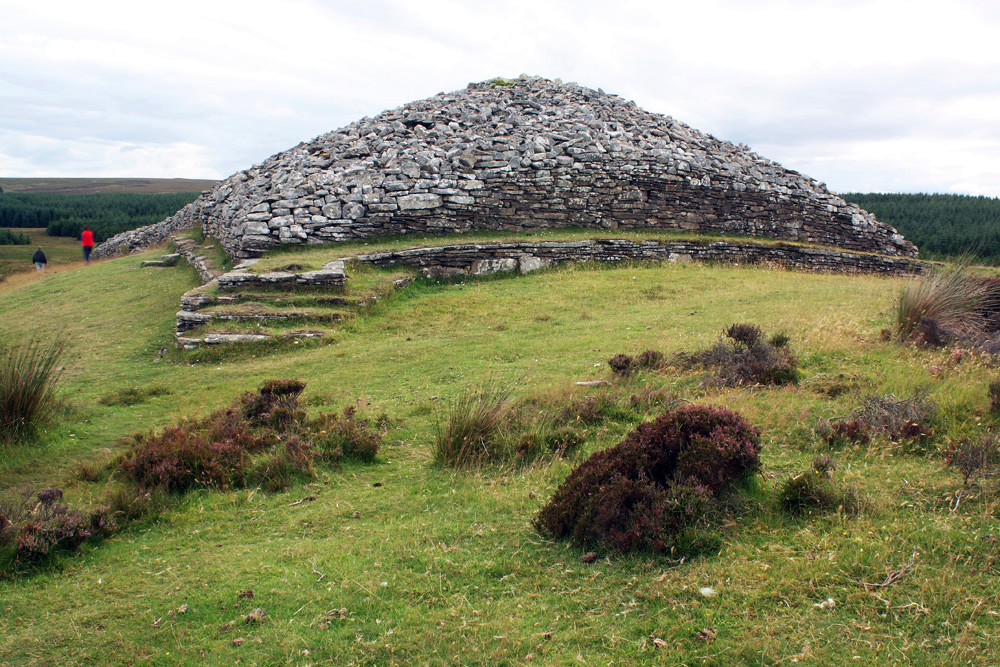
- The Camster Long Cairn
- Interactive map of Grey Cairns of Camster
- 58.3793°N 3.2662°W
- Type: chambered cairns
- Location: Scotland

History
- Built: c. 3000 BC

Site notes
- Material: Stone
- Height: Camster Long: 4.6 meters Camster Round: 3.7 meters
- Length: Camster Long: 60 meters
- Diameter: Camster Round: 18 meters

The Grey Cairns of Camster are two large Neolithic chambered cairns around 8.5 miles (14 kilometres) south of Watten and 5 miles (8 km) north of Lybster in Caithness, in the Highland region of Scotland. They are among the oldest structures in Scotland, dating to around 3,000 BC. The cairns demonstrate the complexity of Neolithic architecture, with central burial chambers accessed through narrow passages from the outside. They were excavated and restored by Historic Environment Scotland in the late 20th century and are open to the public.

== Location ==
The cairns, which are considered to be examples of the Orkney-Cromarty type of chambered cairn, were constructed in the third or fourth millennium BC in a desolate stretch of boggy peat-covered moorland in the Flow Country of Caithness. They consist of two structures standing 180 m (590 ft) apart, known as Camster Round and Camster Long. A third cairn, about 120 metres (390 ft) away from Camster Round, is not considered to be part of the grouping. The cairns are just west of a minor road built in the 19th century to link Watten and Lybster. Camster Burn runs in a north–south direction about 100 metres (330 ft) west of the cairns, while the Loch of Camster is a short distance to the east. Although the surrounding countryside is now inhospitable and sparsely inhabited, during the Stone Age it was fertile farming land and only became covered in peat during the Bronze Age.

== Description ==
=== Camster Long ===
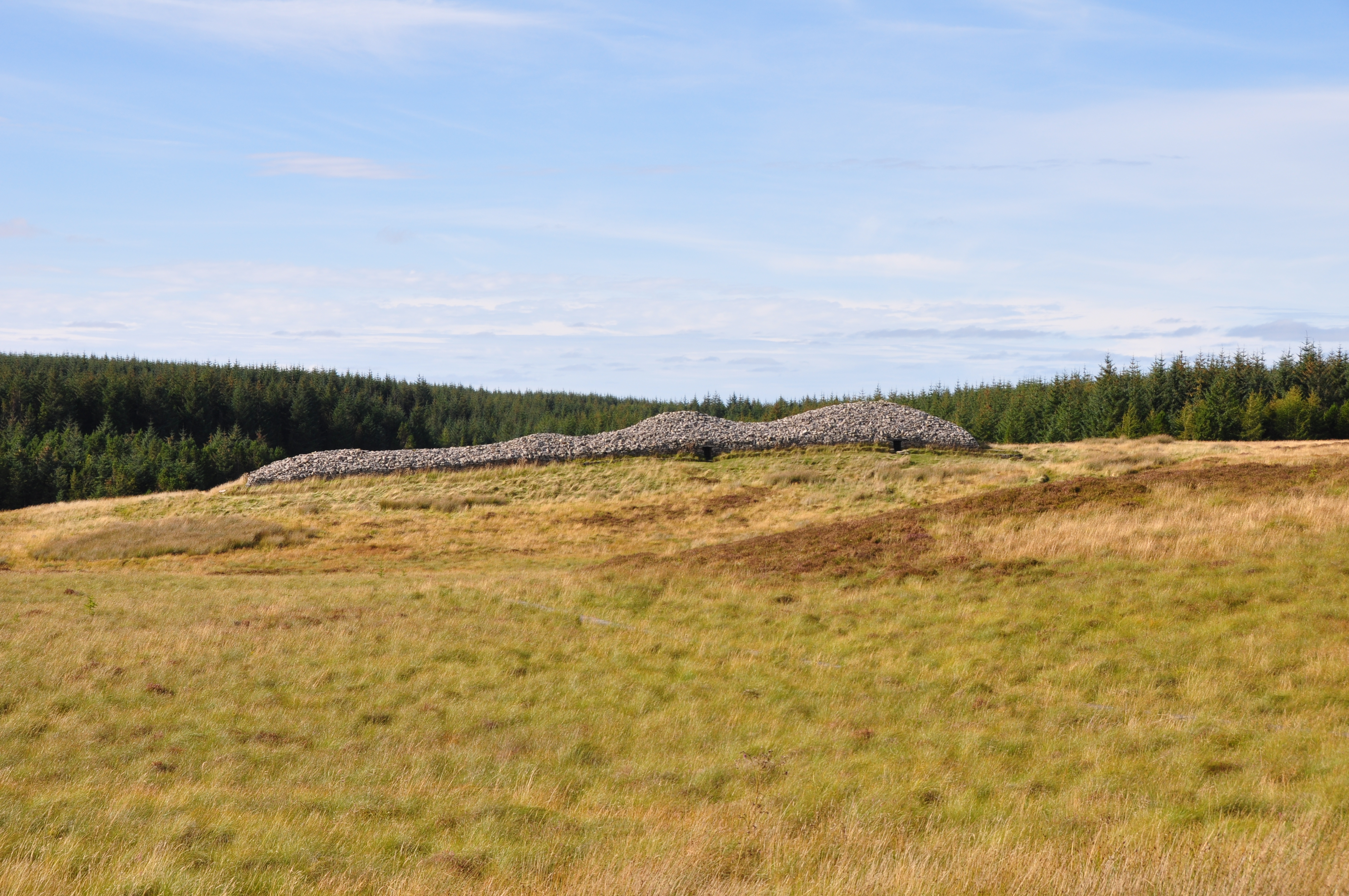
Camster Long viewed from the south-east

Camster Long is a 60 m (200 ft) long cairn with "horns" at each end, aligned in a NE–SW direction. It is twice as wide at one end than the other; the width of the horns differs from 20 m (66 ft) at the north-east end to 10 m (33 ft) at the south-west end. It reaches a maximum height of 4.6 m (15 ft) at over its two burial chambers about 15 m (49 ft) apart, which are respectively situated about two-thirds of the way along the cairn (starting at the south-west end) and adjoining the north-east end. The two chambers appear to have originally been constructed within separate round cairns, which were only later incorporated into a single long cairn for unknown reasons.

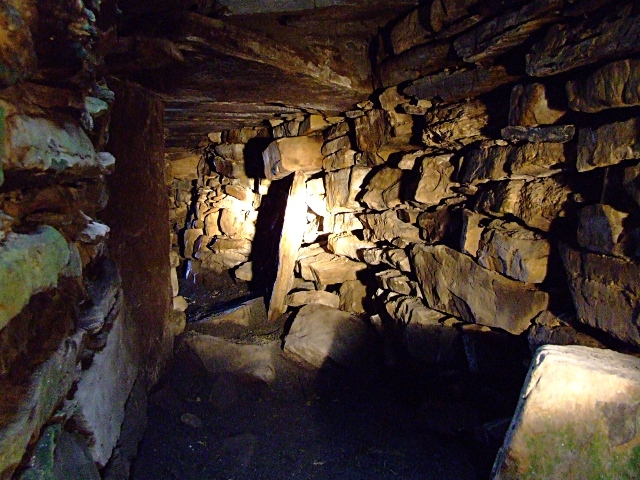
Burial chamber inside Camster Long

The chambers are both entered via passages leading from the south-east side of the cairn. The west chamber consists of two compartments, each delineated by upright portal stones standing 2 m (6.6 ft) high. The first compartment has a maximum width of 1 m (3.3 ft), while the second is 2 metres (6.6 ft) by 1.5 m (4.9 ft). When the tomb was excavated, both compartments were found to contain human bones mingled with broken and unburnt animal bones from horses, oxen, pigs and deer.

The entrance to the east chamber is 9 m (30 ft) from the north-east end of the cairn and consists of a passage 0.6 metres (2.0 ft) high by 7.5 m (25 ft) long. The first 5 m (16 ft) is straight and mostly intact, though the inner end is roofless and broken down. At the point where it reaches the chamber, the passageway turns 45° through a portal made from two upright slabs. The chamber is in the shape of an irregular pentagon 2 m (6.6 ft) in diameter, rising to a roof closed by a single square stone set 2 m (6.6 ft) above the floor. There may be a third as yet undiscovered chamber at the south-west end, suggested by the presence of exposed upright stones which may indicate the presence of a portal.

=== Camster Round ===
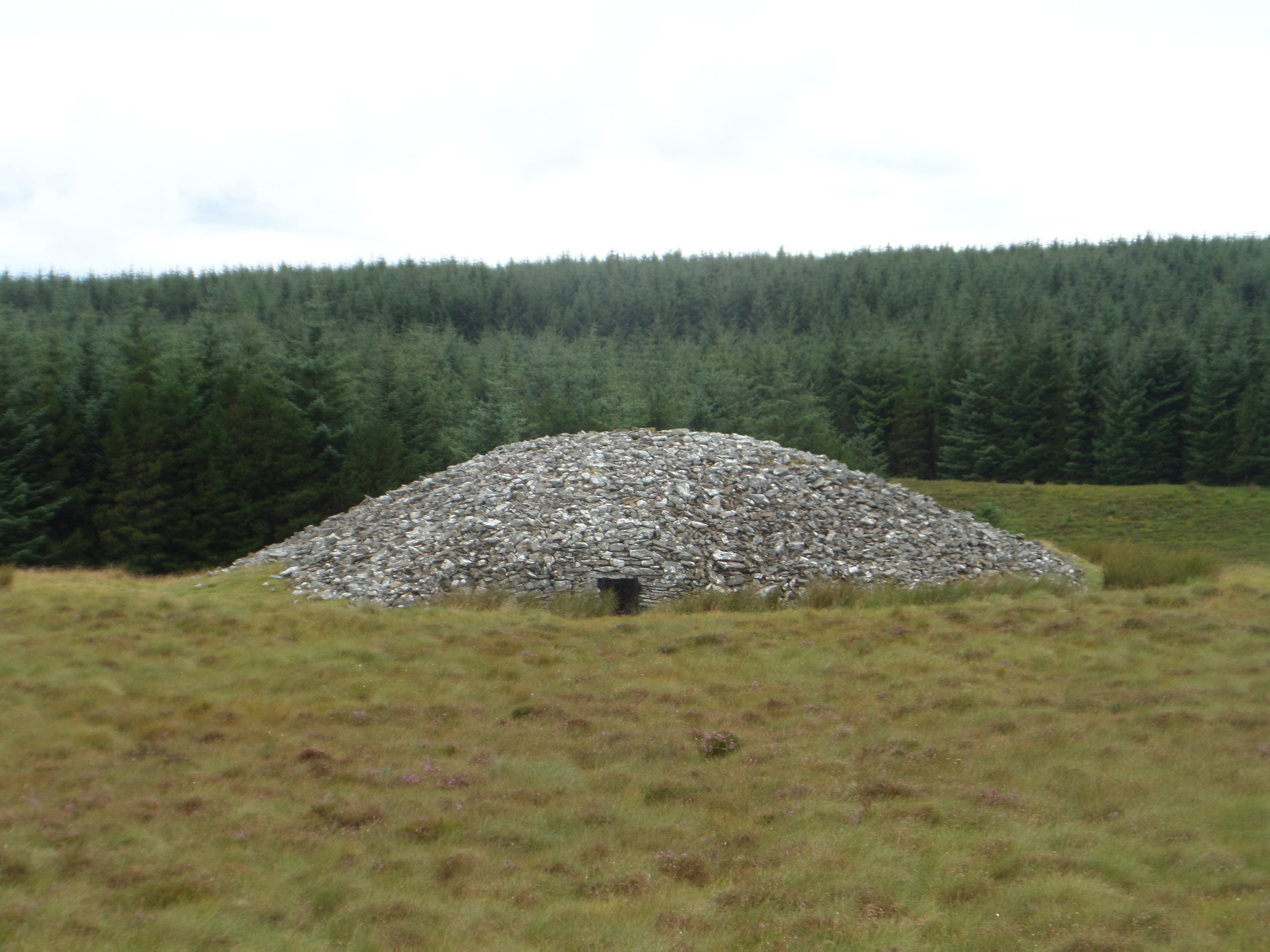
Camster Round

Camster Round is, as the name suggests, a circular cairn; it measures 18 metres (59 ft) in diameter by 3.7 metres (12 ft) high. Its form may be similar to that of the original separate round cairns that were later amalgamated into Camster Long. It is virtually intact with a high vaulted chamber at its centre, accessed from a passage 6 metres (20 ft) long and 0.8 metres (2 ft 7 in) high at the east-south-east side of the cairn. The passage appears to have been deliberately put out of use by blocking it up with stones piled up to the height of its roof. When it was excavated, archaeologists found that the floor of the cairn was composed of a 0.3 metres (1 ft 0 in) deep layer of black earth, ash and burnt bones. It appears that bodies were placed there in a sitting position, though, oddly, without leg bones; the legs appear either to have been removed or to have rotted off before the bodies were deposited in the cairn.

== Archaeology ==
The first archaeological investigations of the cairns was carried out between 1865 and 1866 by Joseph Anderson and Robert Shearer, who investigated a total of seven chambered tombs in Caithness including the two at Camster. The Camster Round Cairn was investigated in 1865, followed by the Camster Long Cairn in 1866.

Between 1966 and 1968, limited studies were carried out by P. R. Ritchie, where some debris was removed and preparatory work was done for the purpose of conservation. Large-scale studies were subsequently carried out between 1971 and 1973 by John Corcoran. However, his illness and death during the excavations meant that the results of his work were not published. Lionel Masters took up the task of completing the excavation and carrying out archaeological research and conservation between 1976 and 1980. The task of consolidating and restoring the cairns was finally concluded in 1981.

== Bibliography ==
- Castleden, Rodney (1992). Neolithic Britain: New Stone Age Sites of England, Scotland, and Wales. London: Routledge. ISBN 9780415058452.
- Masters, Lionel (1997). "The excavation and restoration of the Camster Long chambered cairn, Caithness, Highland, 1967–80" (PDF). Proceedings of the Society of Antiquaries of Scotland (127).
- Phillips, Tim (2002). Landscapes of the living, landscapes of the dead: the location of chambered cairns of northern Scotland. Archaeopress. ISBN 9781841712918.
