= Caithness =

Historic county in northern Scotland

Caithness Gallaibh (Scottish Gaelic)
- Historic county
- Caithness shown with Scotland

- Flag of Caithness, registered in 2016
- Interactive map of Caithness
- Coordinates: 58°25′N 3°30′W
- Sovereign state: United Kingdom
- Country: Scotland
- Council area: Highland
- County town: Wick

Area
  - Total: 618 sq mi (1,601 km^{2})
- Ranked 14th of 34

Population (2021)
  - Total: 25,347
  - Density: 41.00/sq mi (15.83/km^{2})
- Demonym: Caithnesian
- Chapman code: CAI

Caithness (/keɪθˈnɛs/; Scottish Gaelic: Gallaibh [ˈkal̪ˠɪv]; Old Norse: Katanes) is a historic county, registration county and lieutenancy area of Scotland.

There are two towns: Wick, which was the county town, and Thurso. The county includes the northernmost point of mainland Britain at Dunnet Head, and also the most north-easterly point at Duncansby Head near John o' Groats. The Flow Country is the largest blanket bog in Europe, and covers a large inland area in the west of the county. Caithness has a land boundary with the historic county of Sutherland to the west and is otherwise bounded by sea. The land boundary follows a watershed and is crossed by two roads (the A9 and the A836) and by one railway (the Far North Line). Across the Pentland Firth, ferries link Caithness with Orkney, and Caithness also has an airport at Wick. The Pentland Firth island of Stroma is also within Caithness.

From the 9th century the Caithness area was ruled by the Jarl of Orkney, who at different times owed allegiance to both Norway and Scotland. Caithness became a separate provincial lordship from Orkney in the 14th century, an earldom controlled by the Earl of Caithness. The name was also used for the Diocese of Caithness from the 12th to the 17th century. The diocese was larger than the later county, as it also included Sutherland. A shire called Caithness covering the same area as the earldom was created in 1641, after a couple of earlier abortive attempts. Shires gradually eclipsed the old provinces in administrative importance, and also became known as counties.

The county ceased to be used for local government purposes in 1975, when the area became part of the Highland region, which in turn became a single-tier council area in 1996. There was a local government district called Caithness from 1975 to 1996, which was a lower-tier district within the Highland region. The pre-1975 county boundaries are still used for certain functions, being a registration county.

The Norn language was historically the language of everyday communication for people in Caithness, but was gradually overtaken by Scots and then English.

== Toponymy ==
The Caith element of the name Caithness comes from the name of a Pictish tribe known as the Cat, Catt or Catti people, whose Kingdom of Cat covered what would become Caithness and parts of Sutherland from the 9th century. The -ness element comes from Old Norse and means "headland". The Norse called the area Katanes ("headland of the Catt people"), and over time this became Caithness.

The Gaelic name for Caithness, Gallaibh, means "among the strangers", referring to the Norse. The name of the Catti survives in the Gaelic name for eastern Sutherland, Cataibh, and in the old Gaelic name for Shetland, Innse Chat.

== Geography ==
Caithness extends about 30 miles (48 km) north-south and about the same distance east–west, with a roughly triangular-shaped area of about 712 sq mi (1,840 km^{2}). The topography is generally flat, unlike most of the North of Scotland. Until the late 20th century, when large areas were planted in conifers, this level profile was rendered still more striking by the almost total absence of woodland.

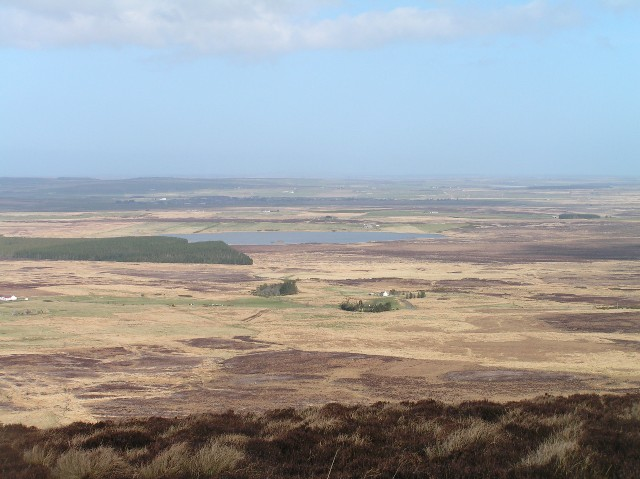
Caithness landscape, looking towards Halkirk from Beinn Freiceadain

It is a land of open, rolling farmland, moorland and scattered settlements. The county is fringed to the north and east by dramatic coastal scenery and is home to large, internationally important colonies of seabirds. The surrounding waters of the Pentland Firth and the North Sea hold a great diversity of marine life. Notable features of the north coast are Sandside Bay, Thurso Bay and Dunnet Bay, Dunnet Head (the northernmost point of Britain) and Duncansby Head (the north-east tip of Britain); along the east coast can be found Freswick Bay, Sinclairs Bay and Wick Bay. To the north in Pentland Firth lies Stroma, the only major island of the county. Away from the coast, the landscape is dominated by open moorland and blanket bog known as the Flow Country which is the largest expanse of blanket bog in Europe, extending into Sutherland. This is divided up along the straths (river valleys) by more fertile farm and croft land. In the far south the landscape is slightly hillier, culminating in Morven, the highest peak in the county at 706 m (2,316 ft).

The county contains a number of lochs, though these are small in comparison with the rest of northern Scotland. The most prominent are Loch Heilen, St. John's Loch, Loch Watten, Loch More, Loch Shurrery, Loch Calder and Loch Mey.

The underlying geology of most of Caithness is Old Red Sandstone to an estimated depth of over 4,000 metres (13,000 ft). This consists of the cemented sediments of Lake Orcadie, which is believed to have stretched from Shetland to Grampian during the Devonian period, about 370 million years ago. Fossilised fish and plant remains are found between the layers of sediment. Older metamorphic rock is apparent in the Scaraben and Ord area, in the relatively high southwest area of the county. Caithness's highest point (Morven) is in this area.

Because of the ease with which the sandstone splits to form large flat slabs (flagstone) it is an especially useful building material, and has been used as such since Neolithic times.

=== Natural heritage ===
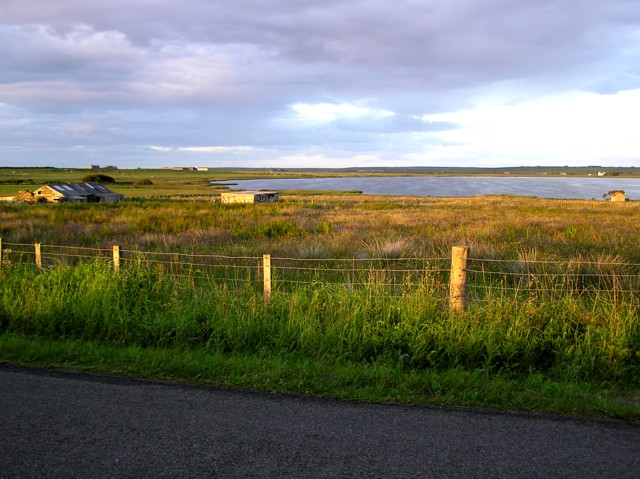
St John's Loch near Dunnet Head has the distinction of supporting the most northerly hatch of Mayfly in the British Isles

Caithness is one of the Watsonian vice-counties, subdivisions of Britain and Ireland which are used largely for the purposes of biological recording and other scientific data-gathering. The vice-counties were introduced by Hewett Cottrell Watson, who first used them in the third volume of his Cybele Britannica, published in 1852.

The underlying geology, harsh climate, and long history of human occupation have shaped the natural heritage of Caithness. Today a diverse landscape incorporates both common and rare habitats and species, and Caithness provides a stronghold for many once common breeding species that have undergone serious declines elsewhere, such as waders, water voles, and flocks of overwintering birds.

Many rare mammals, birds, and fish have been sighted or caught in and around Caithness waters. Harbour porpoises, dolphins (including Risso's, bottle-nosed, common, Atlantic white-sided, and white-beaked dolphins), and minke and long-finned pilot whales are regularly seen from the shore and boats. Both grey and common seals come close to the shore to feed, rest, and raise their pups; a significant population over-winters on small islands in the Thurso river only a short walk from the town centre. Otters can be seen close to river mouths in some of the quieter locations.

Much of the centre of Caithness is known as the Flow Country, a large, rolling expanse of peatland and wetland that is the largest expanse of blanket bog in Europe. Around 1,500 km^{2} (580 sq mi) of the Flow Country is protected as both a Special Protection Area (SPA) and Special Area of Conservation (SAC) under the name Caithness and Sutherland Peatlands, and a portion is further designated as the Forsinard Flows national nature reserve.

In 2014 44 square miles (110 km^{2}) of the eastern coastline of Caithness between Helmsdale and Wick was declared a Nature Conservation Marine Protected Area under the title East Caithness Cliffs. The cliffs are also designated as both a Special Protection Area and a Special Area of Conservation.

== History ==
The Caithness landscape is rich with the remains of pre-historic occupation. These include the Grey Cairns of Camster, the Stone Lud, the Hill O Many Stanes, a complex of sites around Loch of Yarrows near Thrumster, and over 100 brochs. A prehistoric souterrain structure at Caithness has been likened to discoveries at Midgarth and on Shapinsay.

The study of Caithness prehistory is well represented in the county by groups including Yarrows Heritage Trust, North Coast Visitor Centre and Caithness Broch Project.

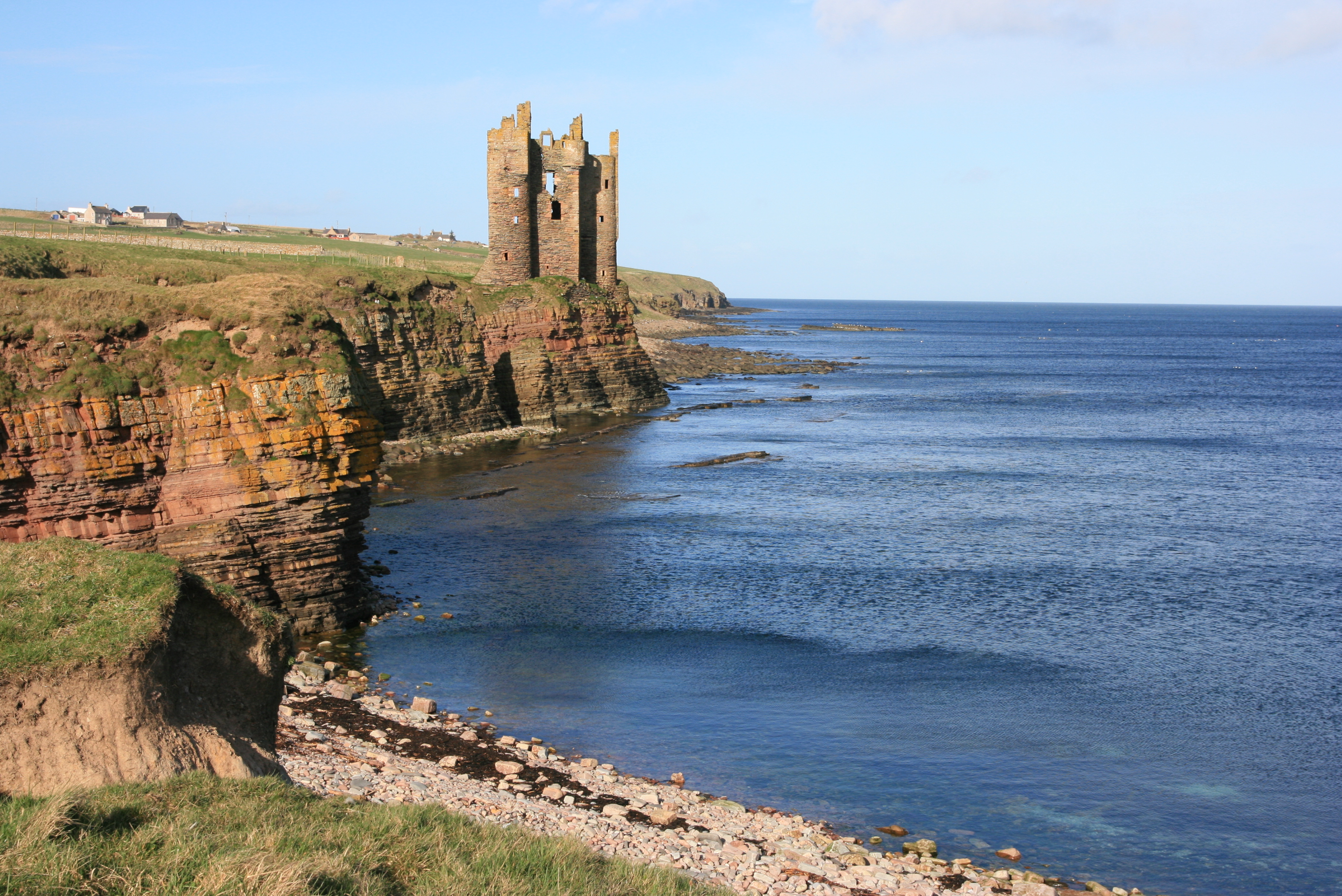
Keiss Castle: 16th century but possibly on site of an earlier building

Numerous coastal castles (now mostly ruins) are Norwegian (West Norse) in their foundations. When the Norsemen arrived, probably in the 10th century, the county was inhabited by the Picts, but with its culture subject to some Goidelic influence from the Celtic Church. The name Pentland Firth can be read as meaning Pictland Fjord.

Norse settlers landed in the county, and gradually established themselves around the coast. On the Latheron (south) side, they extended their settlements as far as Berriedale. Many of the names of places are Norse in origin. In addition, some Caithness surnames, such as Gunn, are Norse in origin.

The area was anciently part of the Pictish kingdom of Cat, which also included Sutherland. It was conquered in the 9th century by Sigurd Eysteinsson, Jarl of Orkney. The Jarls owed allegiance to the Norwegian crown. The Scottish crown claimed the overlordship of the Caithness and Sutherland area from Norway in 1098. The Earls of Orkney thereafter owed allegiance to the Scottish crown for their territory on the mainland, which they held as the Mormaer of Caithness, but owed allegiance to the Norwegian crown for Orkney itself.

The Diocese of Caithness was established in the 12th century. The bishop's seat was initially at Halkirk, but in the early 13th century was moved to Dornoch Cathedral (now in Sutherland), which was begun in 1224.

Caithness became a separate earldom during the 14th century, under the feudal control of the Earl of Caithness. The title Earl of Caithness had sometimes been used by the mormaers who were also Jarls of Orkney; the earldoms had been separated by the time David Stewart, Earl of Strathearn was made Earl of Caithness, sometime between 1375 and 1377.

=== Shire and county ===
In terms of shires (areas where justice was administered by a sheriff), the north of mainland Scotland was all included in the shire of Inverness from the 12th century. In 1455 the Earl of Caithness gained a grant of the justiciary of the area, giving Caithness partial independence from the Sheriff of Inverness.

An act of parliament in 1504 acknowledged that the shire of Inverness was too big for the effective administration of justice, and so declared Ross and Caithness to be separate shires. The boundary used for the shire of Caithness created in 1504 was the diocese of Caithness, which included Sutherland. The Sheriff of Caithness was directed to hold courts at either Dornoch or Wick. That act was set aside for most purposes in 1509, and Caithness once more came under the sheriff of Inverness. The sheriff of Inverness was then directed to appoint a number of deputies, including one based in Wick. In 1584, George Sinclair, 5th Earl of Caithness, forfeited the justiciary of the area after a dispute with George Gordon, Earl of Huntly, who was sheriff of Inverness at the time.

Caithness was restored to being a shire in 1641. The shire of Caithness created in 1641 just covered the earldom of Caithness; Sutherland had been made its own shire in 1633. Wick was declared to be the head burgh of the shire, and the Earl of Caithness became the hereditary sheriff.

Over time, Scotland's shires became more significant than the old provinces, with more administrative functions being given to the sheriffs. In 1667 Commissioners of Supply were established for each shire, which would serve as the main administrative body for the area until the creation of county councils in 1890. Following the Acts of Union in 1707, the English term 'county' came to be used interchangeably with the older term 'shire'.

Following the Jacobite rising of 1745, the government passed the Heritable Jurisdictions (Scotland) Act 1746, returning the appointment of sheriffs to the crown in those cases where they had become hereditary positions, as had been the case in Caithness. From 1748 the government merged the positions of Sheriff of Sutherland and Sheriff of Caithness into a single post. Although they shared a sheriff after 1748, Caithness and Sutherland remained legally separate counties, having their own commissioners of supply and, from 1794, their own lord lieutenants.

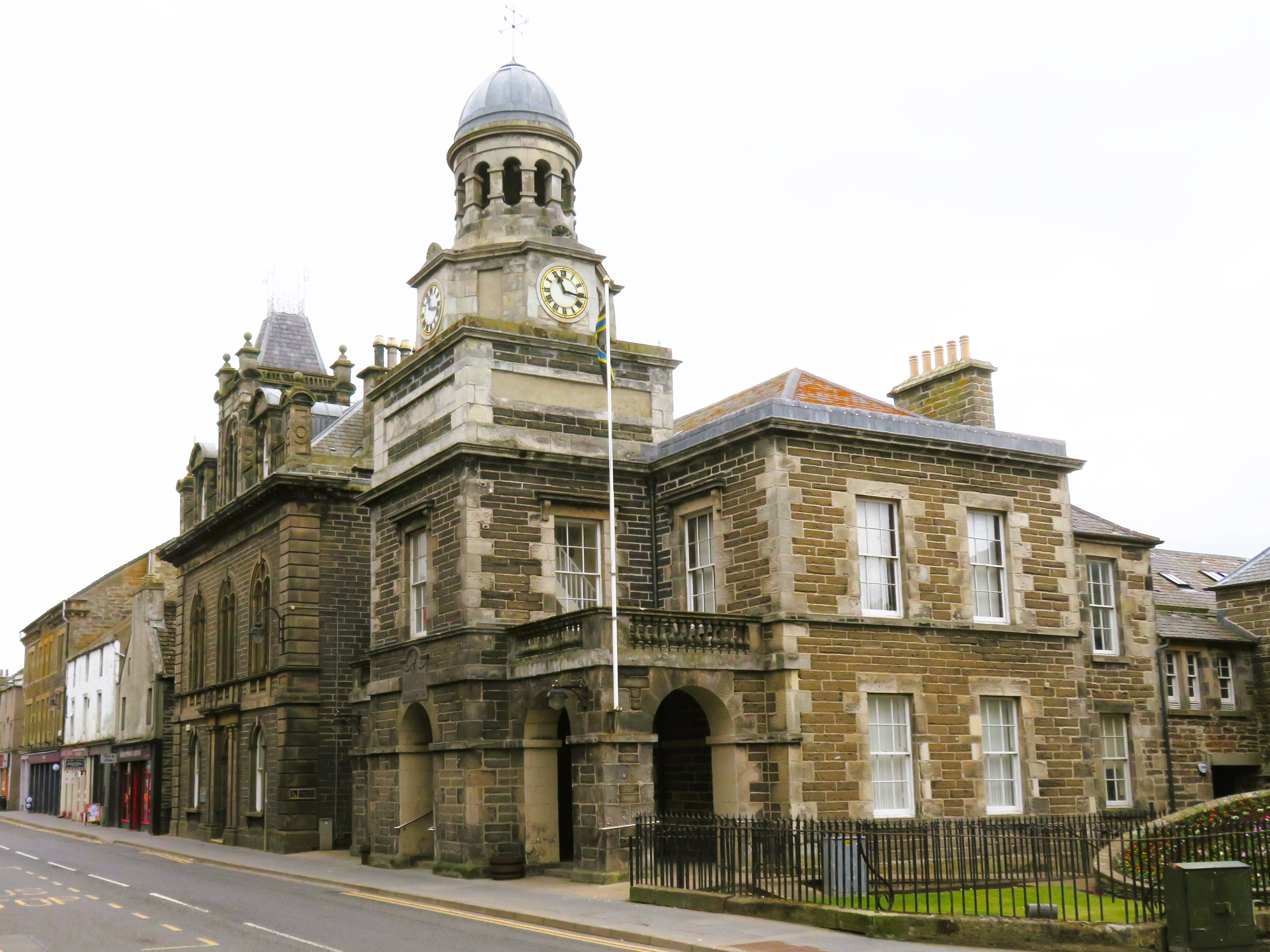
Wick Town Hall, built 1828: Former meeting place of both Caithness County Council and Wick Town Council

Although Wick had been declared the head burgh of the shire in 1641, for much of the next 200 years the sheriff held most courts and had his clerk's offices in Thurso. In 1828 a new Town and County Hall (now known as Wick Town Hall) was completed on Bridge Street in Wick, jointly funded by Wick Town Council and the county's commissioners of supply. Whilst it was under construction, the Wick authorities took legal action against the sheriff, successfully securing an order requiring him to hold regular courts and have his clerk's offices in Wick.

Elected county councils were established in 1890 under the Local Government (Scotland) Act 1889, taking most of the functions of the commissioners of supply (which were eventually abolished in 1930). Caithness County Council held its first meeting on 22 May 1890 at the Town and County Hall in Wick. The county council moved its administrative offices to the County Offices on High Street, Wick, in 1930, but continued to hold its meetings at the Town and County Hall.

The 1889 Act also led to a review of boundaries, with parish and county boundaries being adjusted to eliminate cases where parishes straddled county boundaries. The parish of Reay had straddled Sutherland and Caithness prior to the act; the county boundary was retained, but the part of Reay parish in Sutherland was transferred to the parish of Farr in 1891.

=== Since 1975 ===
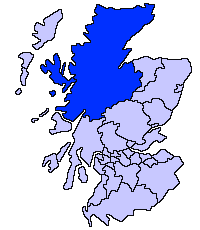
Highland: Region 1975–1996, council area since 1996

Local government was reformed in 1975 under the Local Government (Scotland) Act 1973, which replaced Scotland's counties, burghs and landward districts with a two-tier structure of upper-tier regions and lower-tier districts. Caithness became part of the Highland Region. At the district level there was a Caithness District, which initially covered the pre-1975 county plus the parishes of Farr and Tongue from Sutherland. The transfer of Farr and Tongue to Caithness district was not popular; less than two years later, in 1977, they were transferred to the Sutherland district, after which the district covered the same area as the pre-1975 county.

Caithness District Council was based at the former county council's headquarters at the County Offices in Wick, and held its meetings alternating between Wick Town Hall and Thurso Town Hall. Throughout the district's existence from 1975 to 1996, a majority of the seats were held by independent councillors.

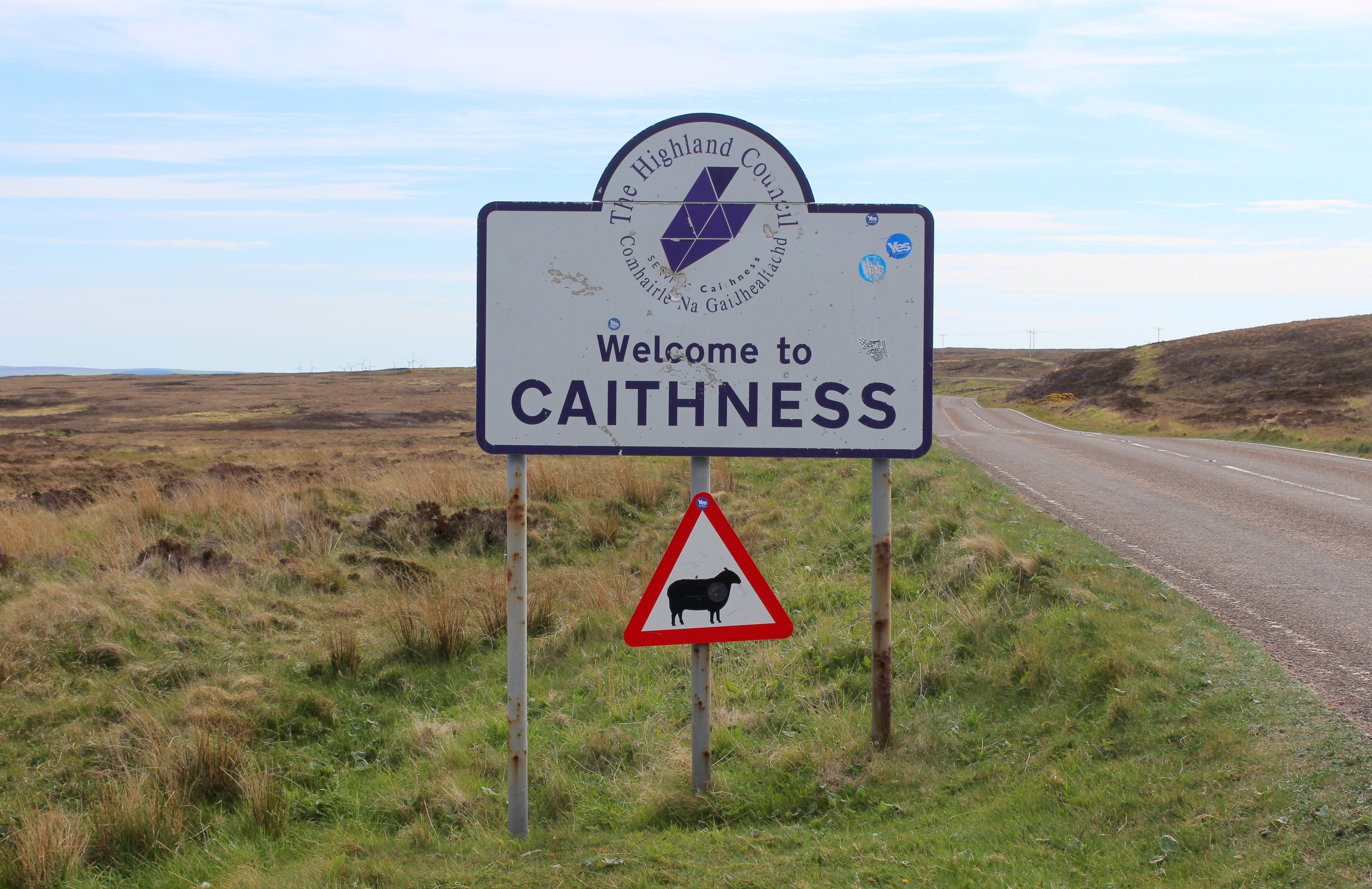
County boundary sign on the A836 west of Reay

Further local government reforms in 1996 under the Local Government etc. (Scotland) Act 1994 saw the regions and districts created in 1975 abolished and replaced with single-tier council areas. The former Highland region became one of the new council areas. The boundaries of the historic county are still used for some limited official purposes connected with land registration, being a registration county. The pre-1996 district (being the same area as the pre-1975 county) is also used as a lieutenancy area, served by the Lord Lieutenant of Caithness.

The Highland Council has an area committee called the Caithness Committee, comprising the councillors representing the wards which approximately cover the Caithness area. The council also marks the historic county boundaries with road signs.

== Parishes ==
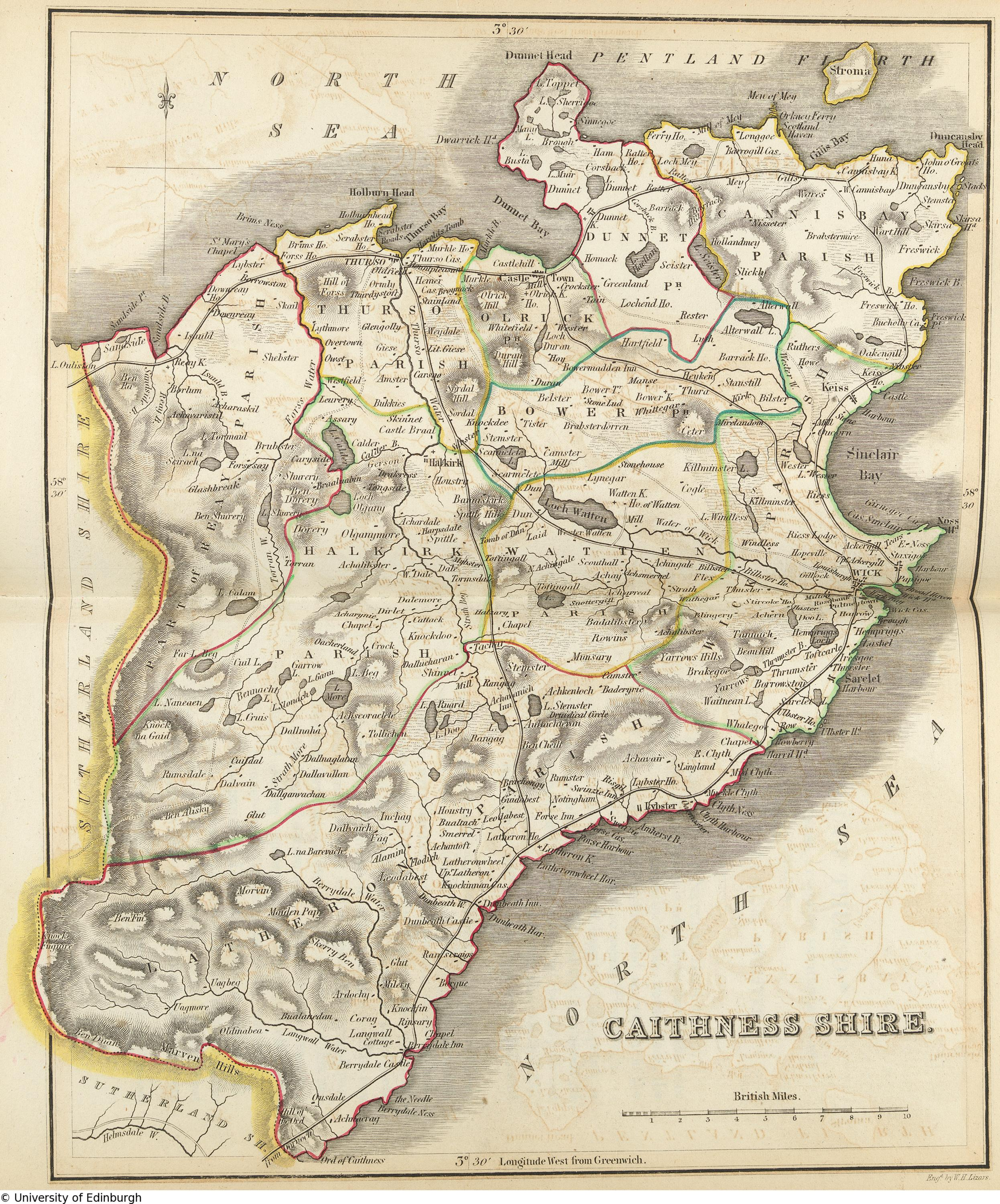
Parish map 1845

Parishes existed from medieval times. From 1845 to 1894 they had parish boards and from 1894 to 1930 they had parish councils. They have had no administrative functions since 1930, but continue to be used for the presentation of statistics.

Following the 1891 parish boundary changes, Caithness contained the following civil parishes:

- Bower
- Canisbay
- Dunnet
- Halkirk
- Latheron
- Olrig
- Reay
- Thurso (included burgh of same name)
- Watten
- Wick (included burgh of same name)

Halkirk was formed at the Reformation by the merger of the ancient parishes of Halkirk and Skinnet. Watten was created from part of Bower parish in 1638.

=== Community councils ===
Community councils were created in 1975 under the Local Government (Scotland) Act 1973. They have no statutory powers, but serve as a representative body for their communities. The Highland Council designates community council areas, but a community council is only formed if there is sufficient interest from the residents. Since a review in 2019, Caithness has comprised the following communities, of which all except Bower have community councils operating as at 2024:

- Berriedale and Dunbeath
- Bower
- Caithness West
- Castletown
- Dunnet and Canisbay
- Halkirk
- Latheron, Lybster and Clyth
- Sinclair's Bay
- Tannach and District
- Thurso
- Watten
- Wick

== Parliamentary constituency ==
The Caithness constituency of the House of Commons of the Parliament of Great Britain (1708 to 1801) and the Parliament of the United Kingdom (1801 to 1918) represented essentially the county from 1708 to 1918. At the same time however, the county town of Wick was represented as a component of Tain Burghs until 1832 and of Wick Burghs until 1918.

Between 1708 and 1832 the Caithness constituency was paired with Buteshire as alternating constituencies: one constituency elected a member of parliament (MP) to one parliament and then the other elected an MP to the next. Between 1832 and 1918 Caithness elected an MP to every parliament.

In 1918 the Caithness constituency and Wick were merged into the then new constituency of Caithness and Sutherland. In 1997 Caithness and Sutherland was merged into Caithness, Sutherland and Easter Ross.

The Scottish Parliament constituency of Caithness, Sutherland and Easter Ross was created in 1999 and now has boundaries slightly different from those of the House of Commons constituency. It was replaced by the larger constituency of Caithness, Sutherland and Ross in 2011.

The modern constituencies may be seen as more sub-divisions of the Highland area than as representative of counties (and burghs). For its own purposes, however, the Highland Council uses more conservative sub-divisions, with names which refer back to the era of district councils and, in some cases, county councils.

In the Scottish Parliament Caithness is represented also as part of the Highlands and Islands electoral region.

== Towns and villages ==
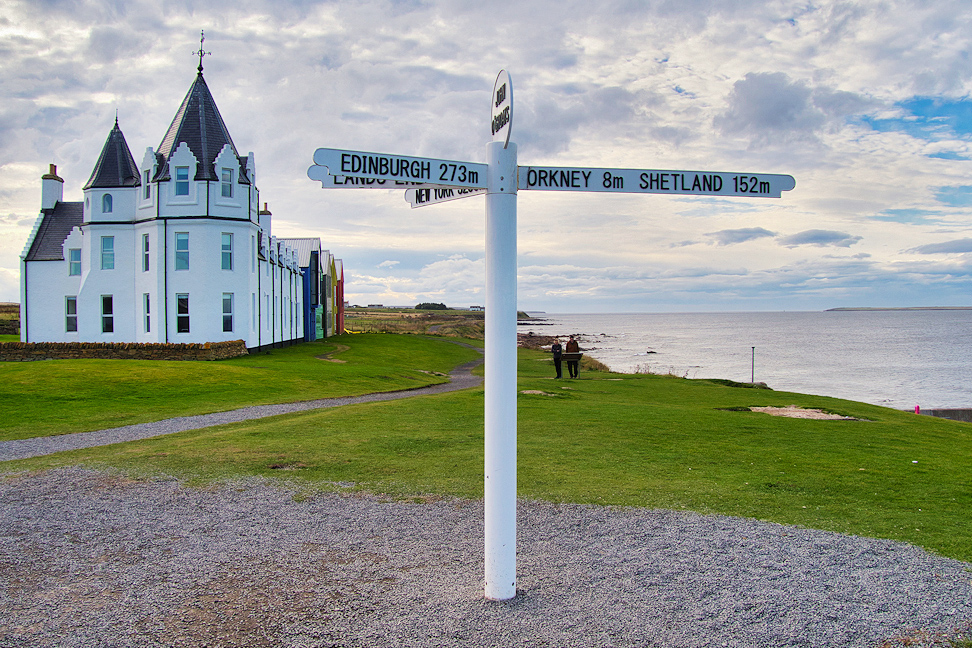
John o' Groats

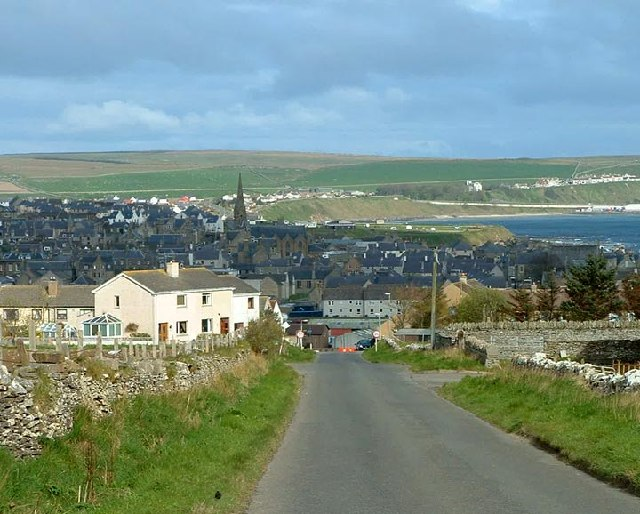
Thurso

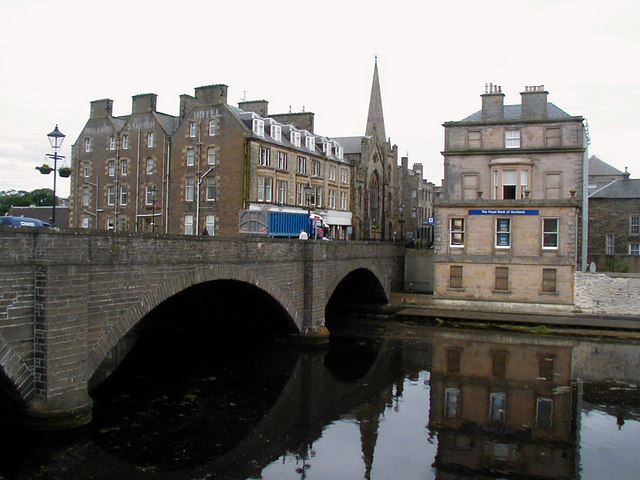
Wick

In 2021, Caithness had a resident population of 25,347 (26,486 in 2011).

There are two towns in Caithness: Thurso and Wick. 54% of the population live in one of those towns.

There are also a few villages large enough to have amenities such as a shop, a cafe, a post office, a hotel, a church or a bank. These include Castletown, Dunbeath, Dunnet, Halkirk, John o' Groats, Keiss, Lybster, Reay/New Reay, Scrabster and Watten.

Other, smaller settlements include:

- Achingills
- Achreamie
- Achvarasdal
- Ackergill
- Altnabreac
- Auckengill
- Balnabruich
- Berriedale
- Bilbster
- Borgue
- Bower
- Brabsterdorran
- Braemore
- Broubster
- Brough
- Bruan
- Buldoo
- Burnside
- Canisbay
- Clyth
- Crosskirk
- Dorrery
- Dunbeath
- Forss
- Fresgoe
- Freswick
- Gillock
- Gills
- Ham
- Harrow
- Haster
- Houstry
- Huna
- Killimster
- Landhallow
- Latheron
- Latheronwheel
- Mey
- Murkle
- Mybster
- Newlands of Geise
- Newport
- Papigoe
- Ramscraig
- Reaster
- Reiss
- Roadside
- Roster
- Sarclet
- Scarfskerry
- Shebster
- Skirza
- Smerral
- Sordale
- Spittal
- Staxigoe
- Swiney
- Thrumster
- Ulbster
- Upper Camster
- Upper Lybster
- Westerdale
- Westfield
- Weydale
- Whiterow

== Transport ==
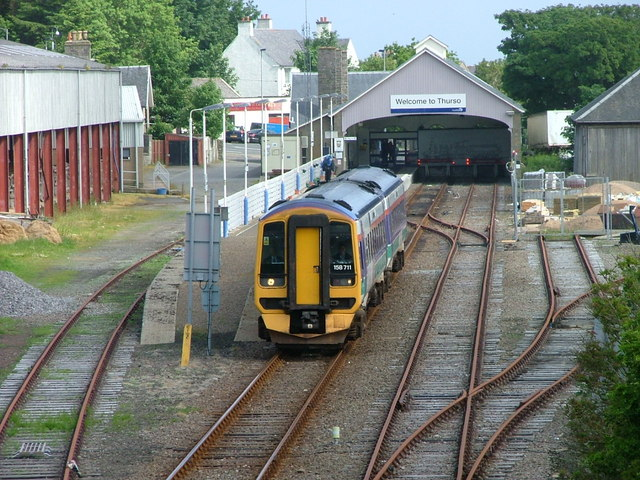
Thurso train station, the northernmost station in the UK

Caithness is served by the Far North railway line, which runs west–east across the middle of the county serving Altnabreac and Scotscalder before splitting in two at Georgemas Junction, from where the east branch continues to Wick whilst the north branch terminates at Thurso.

Stagecoach Group provided bus transport between the major towns, and on to Inverness via Sutherland and Ross-shire.

The ferry port at Scrabster provides a regular service to Stromness in the Orkney Islands. Ferries also run from Gills Bay to St Margaret's Hope on South Ronaldsay. A summer-only ferry runs from John o' Groats to Burwick on South Ronaldsay.

Wick Airport provided regular flights to Aberdeen and Edinburgh until 2020 when Loganair and Eastern Airways cancelled their flights. In 2021 there were no scheduled flights to and from Wick Airport. Starting on 11 April 2022, Eastern Airways started a scheduled operation to Wick from Aberdeen.

== Language ==
At the beginning of recorded history, Caithness was inhabited by the Picts, whose language Pictish is thought to have been related to the Brythonic languages spoken by the Britons to the south. The Norn language was introduced to Caithness, Orkney, and Shetland by the Norse occupation, which is generally proposed to be c. AD 800. Although little is known of that Norn dialect, some of this linguistic influence still exists in parts of the county, particularly in place names. Norn continued to be spoken in Caithness until perhaps the 15th century. and lingered until the late 18th century in the Northern Isles.

It is sometimes erroneously claimed that Gaelic has never been spoken in Caithness, but this is a result of language shift to Scots, and then towards Standard Scottish English during recent centuries. The Gaelic name for the region, Gallaibh, translates as "Land of the Gall (non-Gaels)", a name which reflects historic Norse rule. Gaelic speakers seem to first figure in the early stage of the Scandinavian colonisation of Caithness, gradually increasing in numerical significance from the 12th century onwards. Gaelic has survived, in a limited form, in western parts of the county.

Scots began supplanting Norn in the early 14th century at the time of the Wars of Scottish Independence. The emergent Northern Scots dialect became influenced by both Gaelic and Norn and is generally spoken in the lowlying land to the east of a line drawn from Clyth Ness to some 4 miles (6 km) west of Thurso. The dialect of Scots spoken in the neighbourhood of John o' Groats resembles to some extent that of Orkney. Since the 17th century, Standard Scottish English has increasingly been replacing both Gaelic and Scots.

Records showing what languages were spoken apparently do not exist from before 1706, but by that time, "[I]f ye suppose a Parallel to the hypotenuse drawn from Week to Thurso, these on the Eastside of it speak most part English, and those on the Westside Irish; and the last have Ministers to preach to them in both languages." Similarly, it is stated at that time that there were "Seven parishes [out of 10 or 11] in [the Presbytery of] Caithness where the Irish language is used."

As previously indicated, the language mix or boundary changed over time, but the New Statistical Record in 1841 says: "On the eastern side of [the Burn of East Clyth] scarcely a word of Gaelic was either spoken or understood, and on the west side, English suffered the same fate". Other sources state:

- "There are Seven parishes in [the Presbytery of] Caithness where the Irish language is used, viz. Thurso, Halkrig [Halkirk], Rhae [Reay], Lathrone [Latheron], Ffar [Farr], Week [Wick], Duirness [Durness]. But the people of Week understand English also." (Presbytery of Caithness, 1706)
- "A presbytery minute of 1727 says of 1,600 people who had 'come of age', 1500 could speak Gaelic only, and a mere five could read. Gaelic at this time was the principal language in most parishes except Bower, Canisbay, Dunnet and Olrig".
- "Persons with a knowledge of Gaelic in the County of Caithness (in 1911) are found to number 1,685, and to constitute 6.7 per cent of the entire population of three years of age and upwards. Of these 1,248 were born in Caithness, 273 in Sutherland, 77 in Ross & Cromarty, and 87 elsewhere.... By an examination of the age distribution of the Gaelic speakers, it is found that only 22 of them are less than 20 years of age."

According to the 2011 Scotland Census, 282 (1.1%) residents of Caithness age three and over can speak Gaelic while 466 (1.8%) have some facility with the language. The percentage figures are almost exactly the same as for all of Scotland (1.1% and 1.7%, respectively). Nearly half of all Gaelic speakers in the county live in Thurso civil parish. The town of Thurso hosts the only Gaelic-medium primary school unit in all of Caithness (see Thurso § Education).

The bilingual road sign policy of Highland Region Council has led to some controversy in the region. In 2008, eight of the ten Caithness representatives to the Highland Council tried to prevent the introduction of bilingual English-Gaelic road signs into the county. The first bilingual sign in Caithness was erected in 2012. In 2013, a bilingual road sign on the A99 road next to Wick Airport was damaged by gunfire within 24 hours of it being placed. Gaelic-speaking Councillor Alex MacLeod, at the time representing Landward Caithness in the Highland Council, referred to it as "an extreme anti-Gaelic incident".

== Flag ==
In 2016 a flag was adopted for Caithness, following a competition organised by the Highland Council. The winning design has a black background representing the county's dark flagstone, with a Nordic cross in yellow and blue representing the area's Norse heritage and the county's coast. A galley with a raven on its sail appears in one quarter; this was a traditional symbol of the county and had appeared on the old county council's coat of arms.

== Local media ==
=== Newspapers ===
The John O'Groat Journal and The Caithness Courier are weekly newspapers published by Scottish Provincial Press Limited trading as North of Scotland Newspapers and using offices in Union Street, Wick (but with public reception via Cliff Road) and Olrig Street, Thurso.

News coverage tends to concentrate on the former counties of Caithness and Sutherland. The John O'Groat Journal is normally published on Fridays and The Caithness Courier on Wednesdays. The two papers share a website.

Historically, they have been independent newspapers, with the Groat as a Wick-centred paper and the Courier as a Thurso-centred paper. Even now, the Groat is archived in the public library in Wick, while the Courier is similarly archived in the library in Thurso. The Courier was printed, almost by hand, in a small shop in High Street, Thurso until the early 60's by Mr Docherty and his daughter. The Courier traditionally covers that week's cases at Wick Sheriff Court.

=== Radio ===
Caithness FM has been broadcasting since 1993 and the Orkney Commercial Radio, Superstation Orkney from Kirkwall from 2004 to 2014.

== See also ==
Constituencies

- Caithness (UK Parliament constituency) (1708 to 1918)
- Tain Burghs (UK Parliament constituency) (1708 to 1832)
- Wick Burghs (UK Parliament constituency) (1832 to 1918)
- Caithness and Sutherland (UK Parliament constituency) (1918 to 1997)
- Caithness, Sutherland and Easter Ross (UK Parliament constituency) (1997 to present)
- Caithness, Sutherland and Easter Ross (Scottish Parliament constituency) (1999 to 2011)
- Caithness, Sutherland and Ross (Scottish Parliament constituency) (2011 to present)

Other

- Caithness Broch Project
- Caithness Glass
- Clan Gunn
- Clan Sinclair
- Counties of Scotland
- List of counties of Scotland 1890–1975
- Local government in Scotland
- Local government areas of Scotland 1973 to 1996
- Maiden Paps, Caithness
- Medieval Diocese of Caithness
- Politics of the Highland council area
- Subdivisions of Scotland
