= Bower, Highland =

Village in Caithness, Scotland

Coordinates: 58.5472°N 3.3130°W

Bower: Scottish Gaelic: Bàgair
- Location within the Caithness area
- Population: 633 (2011 census)
- OS grid reference: ND2360
- Council area: Highland
- Lieutenancy area: Caithness
- Country: Scotland
- Sovereign state: United Kingdom
- Police: Scotland
- Fire: Scottish
- Ambulance: Scottish
- UK Parliament: Caithness, Sutherland and Easter Ross
- Scottish Parliament: Caithness, Sutherland and Ross

Bower (Scottish Gaelic: Bàgair) is a village and civil parish in Highland, Scotland It is 10 miles from Thurso and around 11 miles from Wick. Bower is served by Wick, Thurso and Castletown for shopping, taxis and post offices.

Bower's population in 1851 was 1,845; however this has decreased to 633 in 2011.

The village of Bowermadden consists of two streets: Auchorn Square and Thura place as well as some scattered houses and farms.

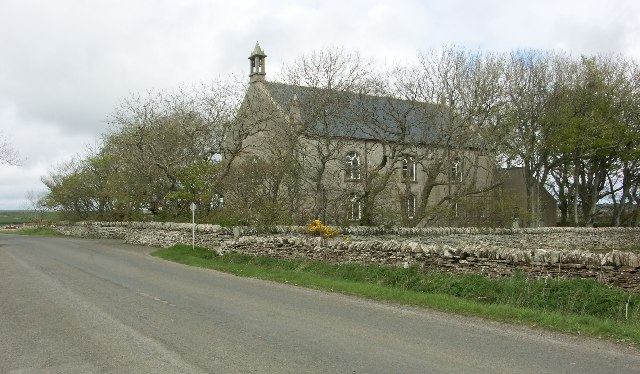
The Parish church of Bower

== Education ==
Bower Busy Bees provides early education to children aged 2.5 to 5 years. Bower Busy Bees is located to the rear of Bower Community Centre in the renovated stables.

Bower Primary School was built in 1976 but was moved to the village years later. Bower Primary's motto is ' Small School, Big Education '.

Children attend either Wick High School or Thurso High School.

== Standing stones ==
The Stone Lud is a standing stone in Upper Bower Tower.

The stone has been claimed as the grave stone of Ljot Thorfinnsson, the 10th century earl of Orkney. At about 3 metres (9.8 ft) from ground level, however, it seems rather taller than anything the 10th century Norse are likely to have used. It is one of the more impressive standing stones in Caithness and has mass and size to compare with those of the Ring of Brodgar in Orkney. Also it is one of two stones, of which the second is now fallen, about 30 metres (98 ft) from the first. When erect the second is supposed to have been behind the first as seen from the direction of the northern hemisphere summer solstice sunset.

In The Standing Stones of Caithness (2003), Leslie J Myatt gives the alignment of the stones as 322 degrees, from the fallen stone to the still standing stone. This alignment may appear to suggest a summer solstice sunset which is too far north for the latitude. However, at about 75 metres (246 ft), the altitude of the stones is quite high with respect to an Atlantic horizon which is visible on this bearing. The sunset alignment differs from that of Maeshowe, a chambered cairn in Orkney, which is built so that sunlight will penetrate the cairn at the time of the winter solstice sunset.

The name of Ljot is very close to that of Lot or Loth, the mythic King of Orkney and Lothian in Arthurian legend, and in Celtic Myths and Legends (1912), Charles Squire identifies Lot as a late incarnation of a British god who is remembered in medieval Welsh legend as Lludd Llaw Eraint. Modern scholars are more skeptical of this connection.
