= Latheron =

Coordinates: 58.28°N 3.37°W

Latheron: Scottish Gaelic: Latharn
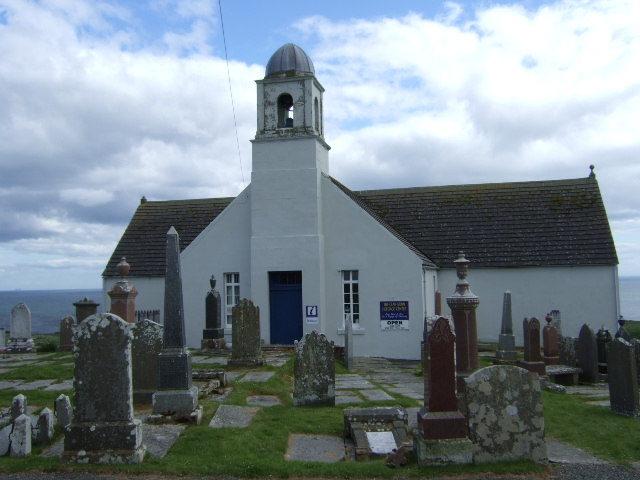
- Clan Gunn Heritage Centre

- Location within the Caithness area
- OS grid reference: ND199335
- Civil parish: Latheron
- Council area: Highland
- Lieutenancy area: Caithness
- Country: Scotland
- Sovereign state: United Kingdom
- Post town: LATHERON
- Postcode district: KW5
- Dialling code: 01593
- Police: Scotland
- Fire: Scottish
- Ambulance: Scottish
- UK Parliament: Caithness, Sutherland and Easter Ross
- Scottish Parliament: Caithness, Sutherland and Ross constituency in the Highlands and Islands electoral region

Latheron (from Scottish Gaelic Latharn 'muddy place') is a small village and civil parish in Caithness, in the Highland area of Scotland, centred on the junction of the A9 with the A99.

The Clan Gunn Heritage Centre and Museum is housed in the old Parish Church (built in 1734). The church was donated to the Society in 1974 and with financial support from the Highlands and Islands Development Board, Caithness District Council and the Scottish Countryside Commission the clan society converted it into a museum; it was officially opened on 22 August 1985.
