= KW postcode area =

Postcode area within the United Kingdom

Kirkwall
- Postcode area
- Location within the United Kingdom
- Coordinates: 58.654°N 3.289°W
- Sovereign state: United Kingdom
- Postcode area: KW
- Postcode area name: Kirkwall
- Post towns: 15
- Postcode districts: 16
- Postcode sectors: 22
- Postcodes (live): 1,835
- Postcodes (total): 2,103
- Statistics as at May 2020

The KW postcode area, also known as the Kirkwall postcode area, is a group of sixteen postcode districts in the far north of Scotland, within fifteen post towns. These cover Caithness (including Wick, Thurso, Halkirk, Berriedale, Dunbeath, Latheron and Lybster), east Sutherland (including Golspie, Brora, Helmsdale, Kinbrace and Forsinard) and the Orkney Islands.

Mail for the KW1-14 postcode areas is processed at Inverness Mail Centre, along with mail for the IV and HS postcode areas. Mail for Orkney's postcode areas, KW15-17, is processed at Glasgow Mail Centre before being flown to Kirkwall Delivery Office.

== Coverage ==
The approximate coverage of the postcode districts:

Postcode district	Post town	Coverage	Local authority area(s)
KW1	WICK	Wick, John o' Groats, Keiss	Highland
KW2	LYBSTER	Ulbster, Whaligoe, Bruan	Highland
KW3	LYBSTER	Lybster, Clyth	Highland
KW5	LATHERON	Latheron, Latheronwheel	Highland
KW6	DUNBEATH	Dunbeath	Highland
KW7	BERRIEDALE	Berriedale, Newport	Highland
KW8	HELMSDALE	Helmsdale	Highland
KW9	BRORA	Brora	Highland
KW10	GOLSPIE	Golspie	Highland
KW11	KINBRACE	Kinbrace	Highland
KW12	HALKIRK	Halkirk, Georgemas, Westerdale	Highland
KW13	FORSINARD	Forsinard, Achiemore	Highland
KW14	THURSO	Thurso, Scrabster, Castletown, Dunnet, Mey, Melvich, Strathy, Bettyhill, Skerray	Highland
KW15	KIRKWALL	Kirkwall, St Ola	Orkney Islands
KW16	STROMNESS	Stromness, Hoy, Flotta, Graemsay, Sandwick, Stenness	Orkney Islands
KW17	ORKNEY	Most of Mainland, all of the north isles, Burray, South Ronaldsay	Orkney Islands

== Map ==
KW postcode area map, showing postcode districts in red and post towns in grey text, with link to nearby IV postcode area.

== See also ==
- Postcode Address File
- List of postcode areas in the United Kingdom
