= Olrig =

Coordinates: 58.56327°N 3.43011°W

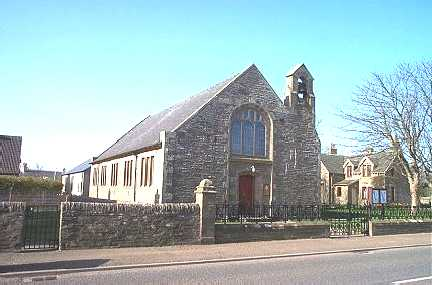
Olrig Parish Church, Castletown by architect David Cousin (1840)

Olrig is a parish in Caithness, Scotland. The main settlement in the parish is Castletown. Prior to the 19th century, the parish was sub-divided into ten townlands or "fermlands". Townland boundaries were mostly disregarded and lost during the agricultural improvements in the 19th century, but many townland names remain identifiable with farmstead names ending with Mains.

== Early history ==
The name Olrig (or Olrick) is thought to signify “the son of Erick,” from one of the Norwegian chieftains prominent in the locale following the invasion of Caithness by the King of Norway at the beginning of the ninth century. The Danes invaded Olrig at a distant period, landing at the bay of Murkle but were defeated by the inhabitants in a conflict on a height called, from the slain, Morthill, which is the origin of the name Murkle.

There are numerous Pictish houses in the parish, and a nunnery is said to have been located on the lands of Murkle, its site perhaps being marked by a small burn called Closters, a corruption of the word cloisters. At the top of the hill of Olrick are the remains of an ancient watchtower, and it is believed that a church called St. Coomb's Kirk once stood near the eastern boundary of the parish. Its name is derived from its probable dedication to St. Columba. This church is supposed to have been the church of the united parishes of Olrig and Dunnet.

There is a tradition that the kirk and the adjoining manse disappeared overnight when they were suddenly overwhelmed by a sandstorm, but “there is no trace of any structure in an area of consolidated sand dunes.”

== Sinclairs of Olrig ==
Members of Clan Sinclair became associated with Olrig in the mid-seventeenth century. They were as follows:

- George Sinclair, the fifth son of Sir James Sinclair of Canisbay.
- Alexander Sinclair, the son of George. He was killed in a duel in 1710 by William Innes of Sandside.
- Donald Sinclair of Olrig and Bilbster, son of Alexander.
- Charles Sinclair, the son of Donald.
- Donald Sinclair, the son of Charles. He died without issue on 9 March 1722.
- Fenella Sinclair, the sister of Donald, who married Archibald Cullen. She sold the lands of Olrig and Bilbster.

== Myths and legends ==
Various legends and folk tales are associated with the parish. Versions of these two tales appear in James Traill Calder's History of Caithness 1887 (pages 55 to 61, as republished 1973 by Stansfield, Fortrose). The hillock and well of Sysa figure in both. According to Calder, the well dried up as a result of 19th century agricultural improvements. The hillock is still there, on the south side of Olrig Hill (grid reference ND169647).

The words of Dorrad, in the first tale, are re-quoted from The Raven Banner (page 19) by Ian Cassells, Thurso, circa 1995.

- See also the Stone Lud

=== Dorrad's vision at Sysa, 1014 ===
At the time of Clontarf, the 1014 battle near Dublin, Caithness was ruled as a part of the Norwegian earldom of Orkney. At Clontarf Earl Sigurd the Stout of Orkney made a bid to become High King of Ireland, in battle with Brian Boru, the established High King. Both Brian and Sigurd died in the battle. Sigurd's bid had been invited by Sigtrygg Silkbeard, the Norse King of Dublin. Sigtrygg survived and prospered.

The battle was fought on Good Friday and, in legend, on the same Good Friday, a Norse poet called Daraddus or Dorrad had a vision, an apparition of the Valkyries, twelve in all, on horseback at Sysa. They seemed to ride into the hillock.

Daraddus himself approached the hillock and found an opening in its side. When he peered inside he saw the Valkyries were weaving a cloth and singing. Daraddus recorded what he heard and saw:

Blood rains from cloudy web on the broad loom of slaughter. The web of man, grey as armor, is now woven. The Valkyries will cross it with a crimson weft

The warp is made of human entrails. Human heads are used as weights. The heddle rods are blood-wet spears. The shafts are iron-bound, and arrows are the shuttles. With swords we shall weave this web of battle.

The Valkyries go weaving with drawn swords, Hild and Hjorthrimul, Sangrid and Svipul. Spears will shatter. Shields will splinter. Swords will gnaw like wolves through armour.

Let us now wind the web of war which the young King once waged. Let us advance and wade through the ranks, where friends of ours are exchanging blows.

Let us now wind the web of war and then follow the king to battle. Gunn and Gondul can see there the blood-splattered shields that guarded the King.

Let us now wind the web of war where the warrior’s banners are forging forward. Let his life not be taken. Only the Valkyries can choose the slain.

Lands will be ruled by new people who once inhabited outlying headlands. We pronounce a great King destined to die. Now an Earl is felled by spears.

The men of Ireland will suffer a grief that will never grow old in the minds of men. The web is now woven and the battlefield reddened. The news of disaster will spread through lands.

It is horrible now to look around, as blood-red cloud darkens the sky. The heavens are stained with the blood of men, as the Valkyries sing their song. We sang well victory songs for the young king. Hail to our singing! Let him who listens to our Valkyrie song learn it well and tell it to others. Let us ride our horses hard on bare backs, away from here, with swords unsheathed.

When the bloody cloth was woven the Valkyries tore it into twelve pieces. Each took a piece and remounted her horse. Then the twelve rode furiously away, six to the north and six to the south.

=== The Piper of Windy Ha ===
Again at Sysa, one sunny tranquil day in the leafy month of June, a cowboy called Peter Water stopped to drink and linger at the well, while on his way home to Windy Ha. He rested and slept till near sunset, when he was awakened by a touch on his shoulder. A young lady was beside him, dressed in green, her eyes blue and her hair in golden ringlets. Peter was bashful and felt himself blushing.

"I have come to make a man of you" the lady said. Peter mistook her meaning and demurred. She laughed and continued with her offer: "I will put you in the way of rising in the world and making your fortune" she said, and she asked Peter to choose between a book and a pipe.

Both were magical. In the book Peter saw the status and fortunes of a popular preacher. In the pipe he saw those of a popular musician. He was attracted by both but, though he had never fingered a pipe before, the pipe is what he chose. He found he could play the pipe immediately, and play it well. One condition was attached to the lady's gift: that he swear by the well to return in moonlight on the same evening seven years hence. Peter promised that if alive he would do so.

Peter was soon a popular and prosperous musician, growing in fame and fortune throughout the next seven years. He was true to his word and returned to the well of Sysa in the moonlight on the same evening, seven years hence. Peter has never been seen since, but still his pipe is sometimes heard in Olrig. (The skeptics, however, attribute the sound to the wind playing though the radio masts on top of the hill.)
