= Stroma, Scotland =

Caithness' island in Pentland Firth off the north coast of Scotland

Stroma
Struima (Scots)
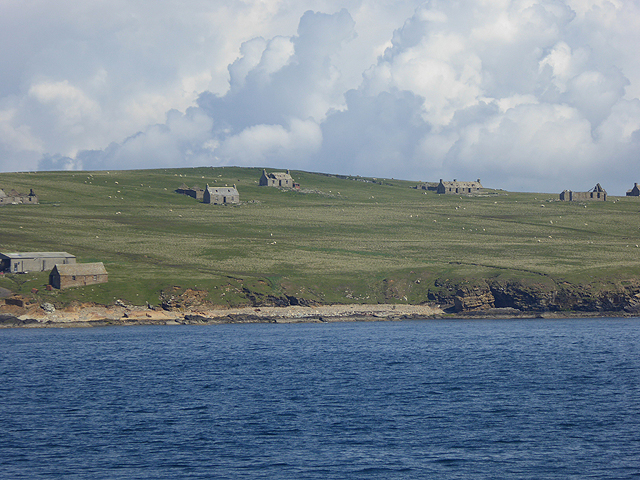

Location
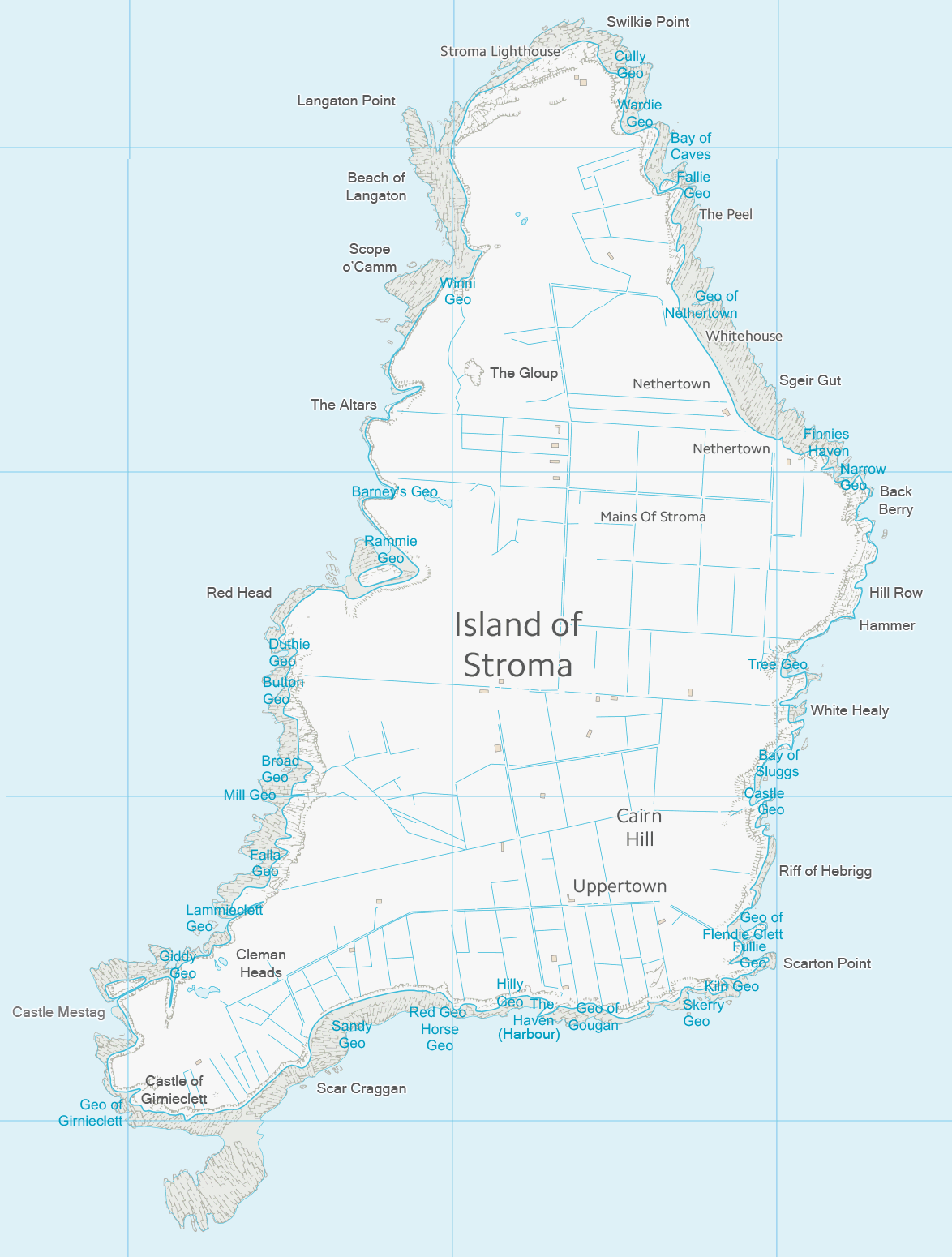
- Map of Stroma

- Stroma shown within the Highlands
- OS grid reference: ND 35105 77539
- Coordinates: 58.680°N 3.120°W

Name
- Name meaning: island in the stream
- Old Norse name: Straumey

Physical geography
- Area: 375 ha (930 acres)
- Area rank: 78=
- Highest elevation: Cairn Hill 53 m (174 ft)

Administration
- Council area: Highland
- Country: Scotland
- Sovereign state: United Kingdom

Demographics
- Population: 0

Stroma is an uninhabited island in the Pentland Firth, between Orkney and the mainland of Scotland. It forms part of the civil parish of Canisbay in Caithness, in the Highland council area. The name comes from the Old Norse Straumey, meaning "island in the stream".

Ancient stone structures testify to the presence of Stroma's earliest residents, while a Norse presence around 900–1,000 years ago is recorded in the Orkneyinga Saga. It has been politically united with Caithness since at least the 15th century. Although Stroma lies only a few miles off the Scottish coast, the savage weather and ferociously strong tides of the Pentland Firth meant that the island's inhabitants were very isolated, causing them to be largely self-sufficient, trading agricultural produce and fish with the mainlanders.

Most of the islanders were fishermen and crofters; some also worked as maritime pilots to guide vessels through the treacherous waters of the Pentland Firth. The tides and currents meant that shipwrecks were frequent—the most recent occurring in 1993—and salvage provided an additional though often illegal supplement to the islanders' incomes. A lighthouse was built on Stroma in 1890 and still operates under automation.

Stroma is now abandoned, with the houses of its former inhabitants unoccupied and falling into ruin. Its population fell gradually through the first half of the 20th century as inhabitants drifted away to seek opportunities elsewhere, as economic problems and Stroma's isolation made life on the island increasingly unsupportable. From an all-time peak of 375 people in 1901, the population fell to just 12 by 1961 and the last islanders left at the end of the following year. Stroma's final abandonment came in 1997 when the lighthouse keepers and their families departed. The island is now owned by one of its former inhabitants, who uses it to graze sheep.

== Geography, geology, flora and fauna ==
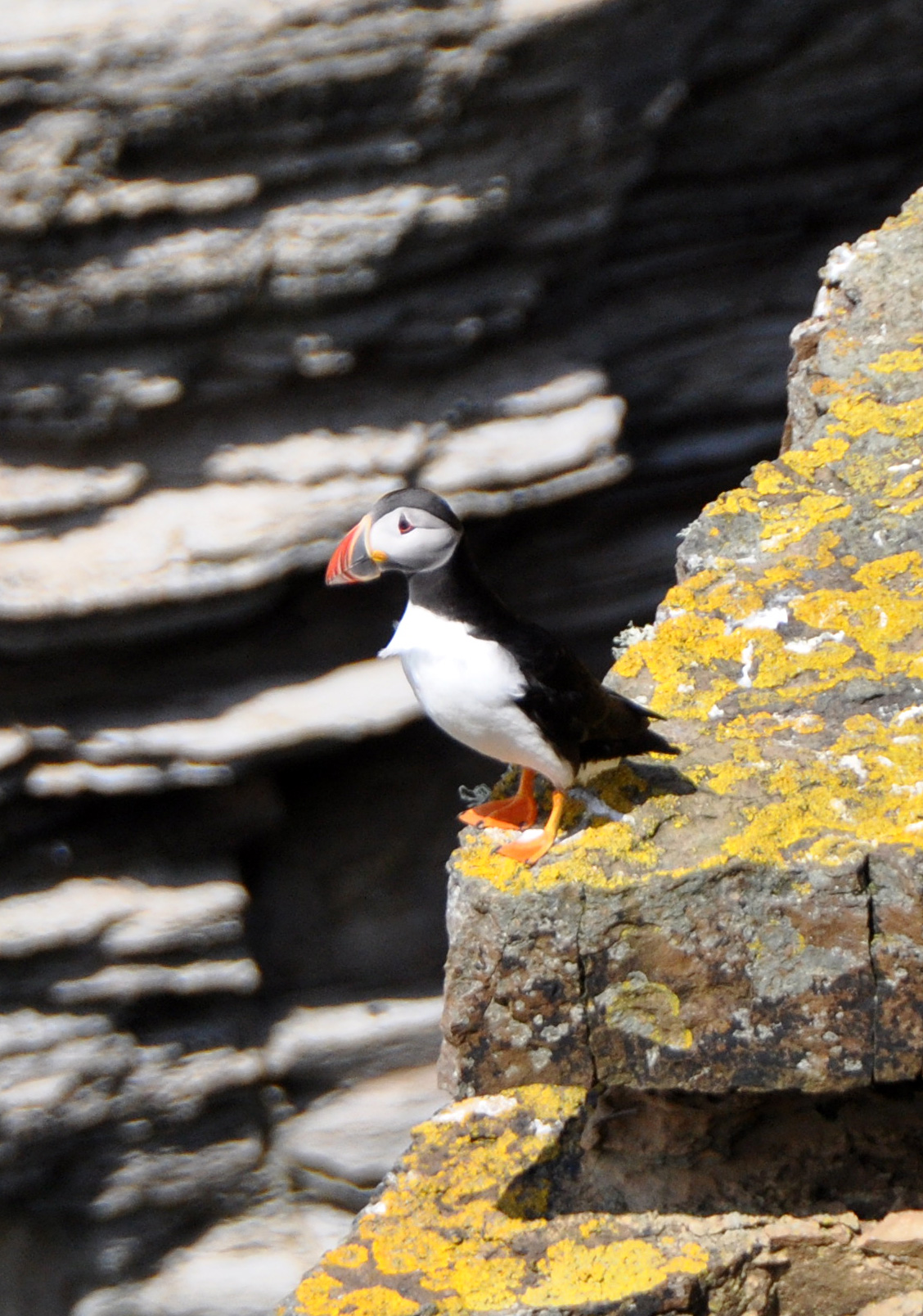
An Atlantic puffin on Stroma

Stroma is located in the Pentland Firth about 2 miles (3 kilometres) northwest of John o' Groats on the mainland. The island divides the firth into two channels, the Inner Sound to the south and the Outer Sound to the north. It is mostly low-lying and flat, covering an area of around 375 hectares (930 acres) and rising to a height of 53 m (174 ft) at Cairn Hill in the southeast. It is oriented in a north-south direction, measuring about 2 mi (3 km) long by 1 mi (2 km) wide.

The tidal race at the north end of Stroma, off Swelkie Point, is known as "The Swelkie". It extends from the point in an easterly or westerly direction depending on the tide and can be particularly violent. The whirlpool, according to a Nordic tradition recorded in the Eddas, is caused by two gýgjar named Fenja and Menja turning the millstone Grótti, which grinds out the ocean's salt. The witches 'Grotti Finnie' and 'Grotti Minnie' feature in later Orcadian and Shetlandic folklore. The name of the race is derived from the Old Norse: Svelgr, meaning "the Swallower".

The island is ringed by cliffs that vary in height from around 33 m (108 ft) on the west coast to low cliffs with a narrow rocky foreshore elsewhere. The eastern side of the island slopes downward in an easterly or southeasterly direction, with the angle of the slope increasing from around 3 degrees in the centre of the island to about 30 degrees on the east coast. The bedrock of the island consists of flat layers of weathered Middle Old Red Sandstone, known as Rousay flags. A six-foot band of the fine-grained stone used to be quarried on a small scale for use on the mainland as roofing material. It is similar in composition to the Mey Beds on the mainland, though in some places on Stroma it is replaced by beds of angular and rounded masses of sandstone in a nodular matrix, similar to the Ackergill Beds in Caithness. Only fragmentary fossil remains have been found; these include specimens of the extinct Devonian fish Dipterus and Coccosteus.

Stroma is bisected by a fault which runs in a north-south direction through its centre, intersected by another fault running in an east-northeast direction across the north of the island. The soil on either side of the fault line is significantly different; the eastern and southern parts of Stroma are covered by fertile clay fed by bedrock minerals, while less fertile boggy ground predominates on the west side.

The heavily indented coastline has a circumference of about 7 mi (11 km), punctuated by numerous geos or inlets created by the waves eroding the sea cliffs along fault lines. A partially collapsed sea cave called The Gloup is located in the northwest of the island. This feature is a deep rocky pit, filled with sea water. It is located at the junction of the two fault lines and is connected to the sea by a subterranean passage 165 yd (151 m) long, created by erosion along the east-northeast fault. The passage is said to have been used for smuggling; the islanders reportedly concealed illegal distilling from HM Customs and Excise by hiding the stills and alcohol in a cave within The Gloup, called "the Malt Barn", which was accessible only at low tide.

The flora and fauna of Stroma are similar to those of the mainland. The island is treeless; its vegetation consists primarily of grasses, heather and small flowers. Seals are plentiful along its shores and are sometimes found inland during the breeding season. Both grey seals and harbour seals are present, with around 650 grey seal pups being born each year. Otters may also be present, as in other parts of mainland Caithness. The western cliffs are the site of colonies of terns, guillemots, fulmars and eider ducks. The western part of the island of Stroma is designated a Site of Special Scientific Interest. The entirety of the island of Stroma lies within the North Caithness Cliffs Special Protection Area. The waters off Stroma support a number of cetacean species including minke whale, white-beaked dolphin and harbour porpoise.

== Demographics ==
Two settlements existed on Stroma: Nethertown, in the north of the island, and Uppertown or Overtown, in the south. They originally belonged to the Freswick estate, which owned Nethertown, and the Mey estate, which owned Uppertown. Between the two was Mains of Stroma, the island's principal farm. A track runs the entire length of the island, connecting the lighthouse at the north tip with the two settlements and the harbour on the south coast.

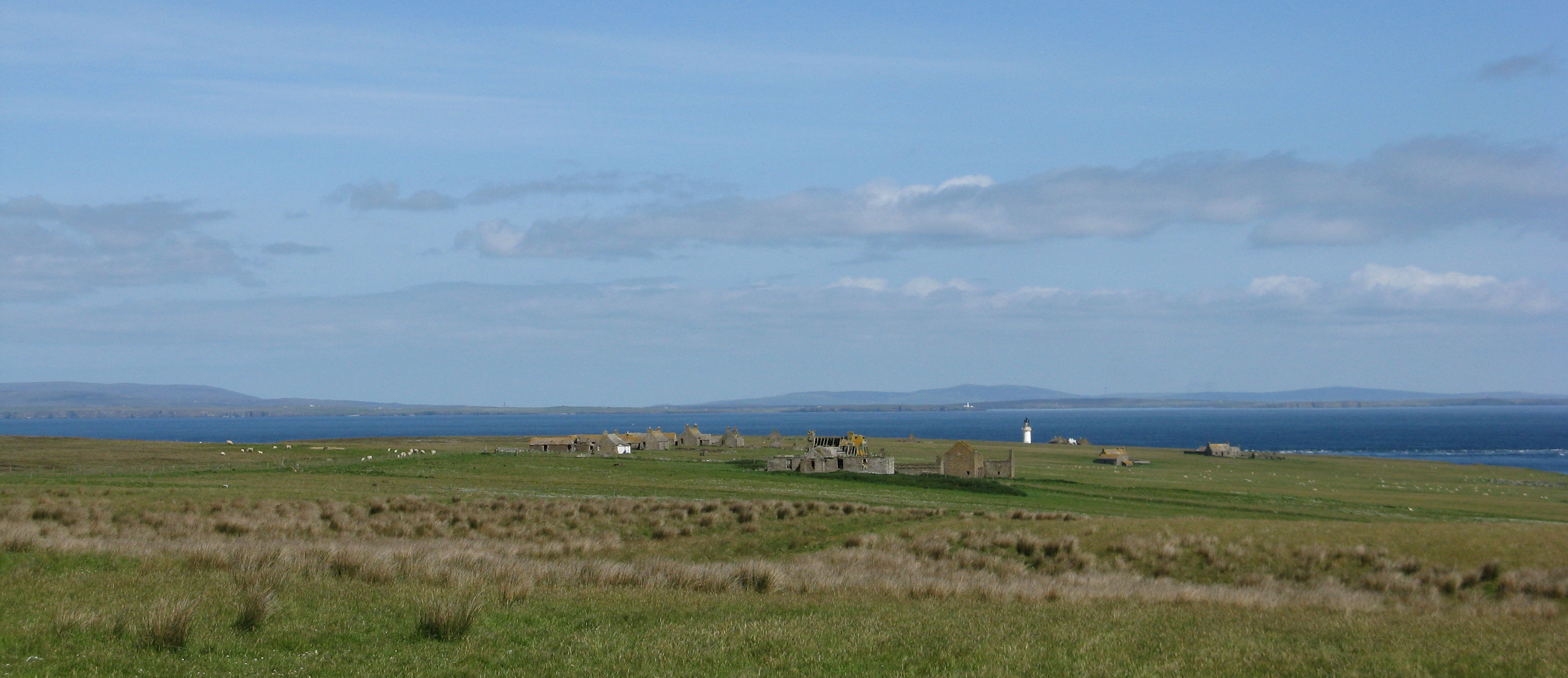
Panoramic view of the north of Stroma, with Orkney in the distance. Mains Farm, the houses of Nethertown and the top of the lighthouse can be seen.

The island is now uninhabited; the last resident islanders left in 1962 and the very last inhabitants, the keepers of the island lighthouse and their families, left in 1997 when the lighthouse was automated. The population reached a peak of 375 in 1901 but censuses conducted between 1841 and 1961 (Note: There was no census in 1941, during the Second World War.) tell the story of the collapse of Stroma's population during the 20th century:

Year	1841	1851	1861	1871	1881	1891	1901	1911	1921	1931	1951	1961
Population	186	211	291	330	341	327	375	339	277	193	111	12

== History ==
=== Prehistoric settlement and remains ===
Stroma was inhabited in prehistoric times, as demonstrated by the presence of a number of ancient stone structures around the island. A ruined chambered cairn is situated at the far north end of the island near the lighthouse. It has been partially excavated and measures some 16 m (52 ft) in diameter by 1.8 m (5 ft 11 in) high. The 18th-century inhabitants of the island collected the prehistoric stone arrowheads that they found on the western side of the island, believing them to be "elf-shot", and regarded them as having been made by fairies. They believed that if they possessed an "elf-shot" they would be granted protection for themselves and their cattle from any harm caused by the fairies.

Structures similar to cists, which the islanders called "Picts' Beds", are also found on the island. Notable examples can be seen in the north near Nethertown. They are usually located near middens, out of which animal bones and shells are eroding. Little appears to be known about the purpose and origins of these structures. Although the Royal Commission on the Ancient and Historical Monuments of Scotland attributes them to prehistory, it is also possible that they are Norse in origin. A kidney-shaped burnt mound located near Castle Geo in the south-east of Stroma can be more confidently ascribed to prehistory. It consists of an accumulation of cracked and scorched stones that were used to heat water in a communal cooking trough. Although the example on Stroma has not been dated, burnt mounds found elsewhere on Orkney and Shetland have been dated to the Bronze Age and the early Iron Age.

The remains of an earth-and-stone fort are situated on the promontory of Bught o' Camm on the west coast of Stroma, near the north end of the island, though its origins are unknown. A rampart standing 1 m (3 ft) with an average spread of 6 m (20 ft) encloses an area of some 70 by 30 m (230 by 98 ft) and blocks off access to the promontory. There is no evidence of structures inside the fort's perimeter. It may possibly have been entered from the east end of the rampart, where a 3 m (10 ft) gap exists, but this may alternatively have been produced by natural processes.

=== Medieval period ===
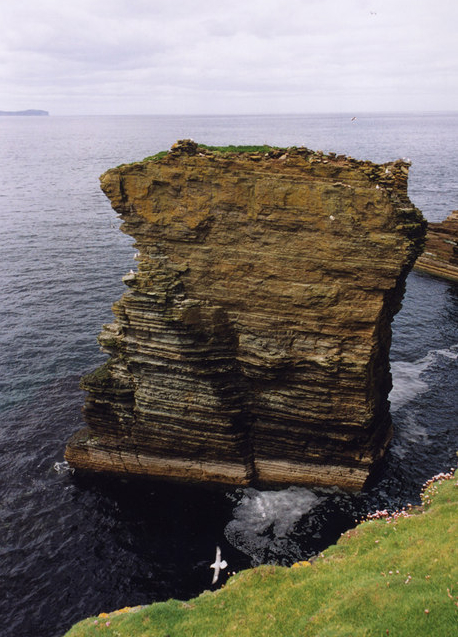
The top of this isolated rock stack is occupied by the scanty remains of Castle Mestag, thought to have been built by the Norse

The first historical record of the island is found in the 12th-century Orkneyinga Saga. It records that a man named Valthiof, the son of Olaf Rolfson, lived and farmed on Stroma. One Yule Eve, he set off in a ten-oar boat to Orphir on Mainland, Orkney at the invitation of the Earl of Orkney, Paul Haakonsson. However, the boat was lost with all hands, as the Saga puts it: "sad news as Valthiof was a most accomplished man". The Earl later granted Valthiof's farm to Thorkel Flettir. Later, a rowdy Viking named Sweyn Asleifsson fled to Stroma, pursued by Earl Harald Haakonsson. The two men were trapped on the island due to bad weather but were persuaded to make peace by a mutual friend named Asmundi, who insisted that Sweyn and Harald should share the same bed.

The Norse are also believed to have built a fortification, now called Castle Mestag, at Mell Head in the far south-west of Stroma. The structure (also known as "the Robber's Castle") is situated on the top of an isolated rock stack some 4.5 m (14 ft 9 in) from the cliffs of the main island. The islanders believed that it had once been connected by a drawbridge or some other kind of artificial span, or alternatively it may once have been accessible via a rock arch that has since collapsed.

Due to its proximity to the Scottish mainland, Stroma has long been politically united with Caithness. An old story tells that possession of the island was once disputed between the Earls of Orkney and Caithness. To resolve the dispute, they relied on a legend that venomous animals would thrive in Caithness but die in Orkney. Some venomous snakes were duly imported to Stroma and survived there, "proving" that the island did belong to Caithness and not Orkney.

It is more reliably recorded that in 1455 the Bishop of Caithness, William Mudy, granted Stroma and other lands and castles to his brother Gilbert. It eventually passed into the hands of the Sinclair family, who have held the title of Earl of Caithness since 1455. In 1659 George Sinclair, the 6th Earl of Caithness, granted the wadset of Stroma to John Kennedy of Kermuck, who had fled to the far north after being outlawed following the fatal wounding of John Forbes of Watertown. (Note: This occurred in the so-called "Slaughter of Watertown", in the vicinity of Ellon Castle in Aberdeenshire.)

115 years later, the Rev. George Low recorded in his account of a tour of the island that he had seen "the remains of a pretty large house and gardens, once possessed by a gentleman, the proprietor of the island, who being forced to fly his native home on account of a duel, chose this for his retreat". The gardens were said to have been furnished with "plants that cured every disease". Nothing is now left of the house, but the gardens may have been located within a walled enclosure near the Nethertown pier.

=== Life on Stroma: 17th and 18th centuries ===
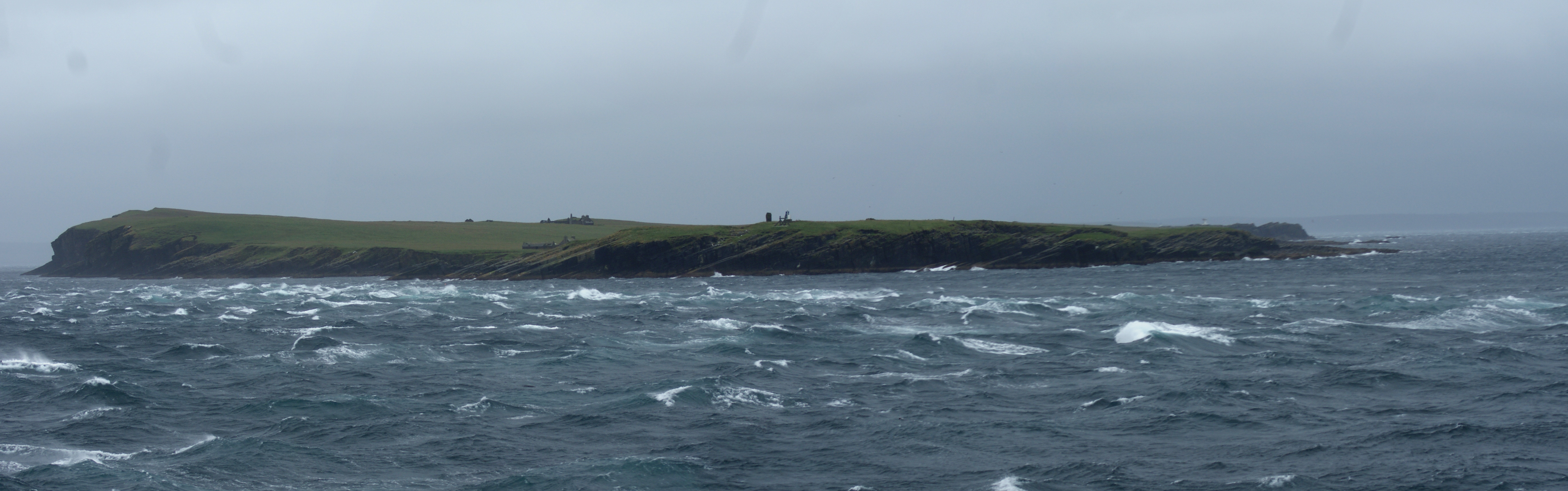
View of Stroma as seen from the Pentland Firth in choppy weather. Bad weather meant that the island was often cut off by sea.

Life on the island was very isolated due to its inaccessibility. Until as late as 1894 it had no landing place, which meant that boats had to be landed directly on the beach and pulled up above the waterline. Particularly in winter, when storms raged through the Pentland Firth, Stroma could be cut off for weeks at a time. Such episodes posed serious risks to the islanders, as they had no doctor. The winter of 1937 illustrated the problems that the weather could pose; during January and February that year, the island was cut off for three weeks by violent gales which demolished houses along the seafront and washed boats 100 yards (90 m) inland. Stroma's isolation came at an especially bad time, as most of the population had caught influenza and supplies of food dwindled to the point that some items had to be rationed. Eventually two boats were able to reach the island, carrying supplies and a doctor from Caithness, along with three weeks' worth of mail.

Two chapels were established on Stroma at some point prior to the 17th century; they were known as the Kirk of Stara (from the Norse name for "big church") and the Kirk of Old Skoil (from Skali, possibly a name given to a farm). Their locations are now unknown, but the Kirk of Old Skoil may have been located in the far south-east of Stroma where the island's graveyard is now. They both fell into disuse by the mid-17th century and, lacking a church of their own, it was perhaps not surprising that the islanders were felt by mainlanders to be somewhat lacking in religious commitment. An inquiry by the Canisbay Kirk in the 17th century rebuked them for visiting "Popish" chapels on the mainland, profaning the Lord's Day, being "ale sellers and drinkers" and playing football and dancing on the Sabbath. The Presbytery decided that the inhabitants were spiritually neglected "by reason of the dangerous passage to that place, especially in winter." The minister of Canisbay was supposed to preach four times a year on Stroma but was reprimanded for doing so only twice yearly. The islanders were instructed to attend church at Canisbay and a kirk session ordained in 1654 that they should be given free passage and that any Stroma person with a boat who stayed away should be fined.

The island's population numbered a few dozen families throughout the 18th century, corresponding to a population of no more than a couple of hundred people; it was recorded as numbering 30 families in 1710, 47 in 1724, 40 in 1735 and 30 in 1760. They rented their land from two branches of the Sinclair family, the Sinclairs of Mey who owned Uppertown and the Sinclairs of Freswick who owned Nethertown. The latter acquired Nethertown in 1721 and eventually took possession of Uppertown as well by obtaining the wadset from the Kennedys, reportedly through skullduggery. According to the deathbed confession of one of the witnesses to the transaction, the laird, Sinclair of Freswick, obtained the "assent" of the deceased Kennedy holder of the wadset by placing a quill in the dead man's hand and moving it to make the corpse write its name on the document. The other witness committed suicide, perhaps out of guilt. The island was reasonably profitable for the Sinclairs; in 1724 the islanders paid an annual rent of 1,300 marks (equivalent to about £125 at 2011 prices), part of which was paid in surplus grain ferried by Stroma's boats to the Sinclair granaries at Staxigoe near Wick. They were self-sufficient in dairy produce and were known for the quality of their cheese-making; Daniel Defoe thought Stroma cheese was excellent.

=== 19th and 20th centuries ===
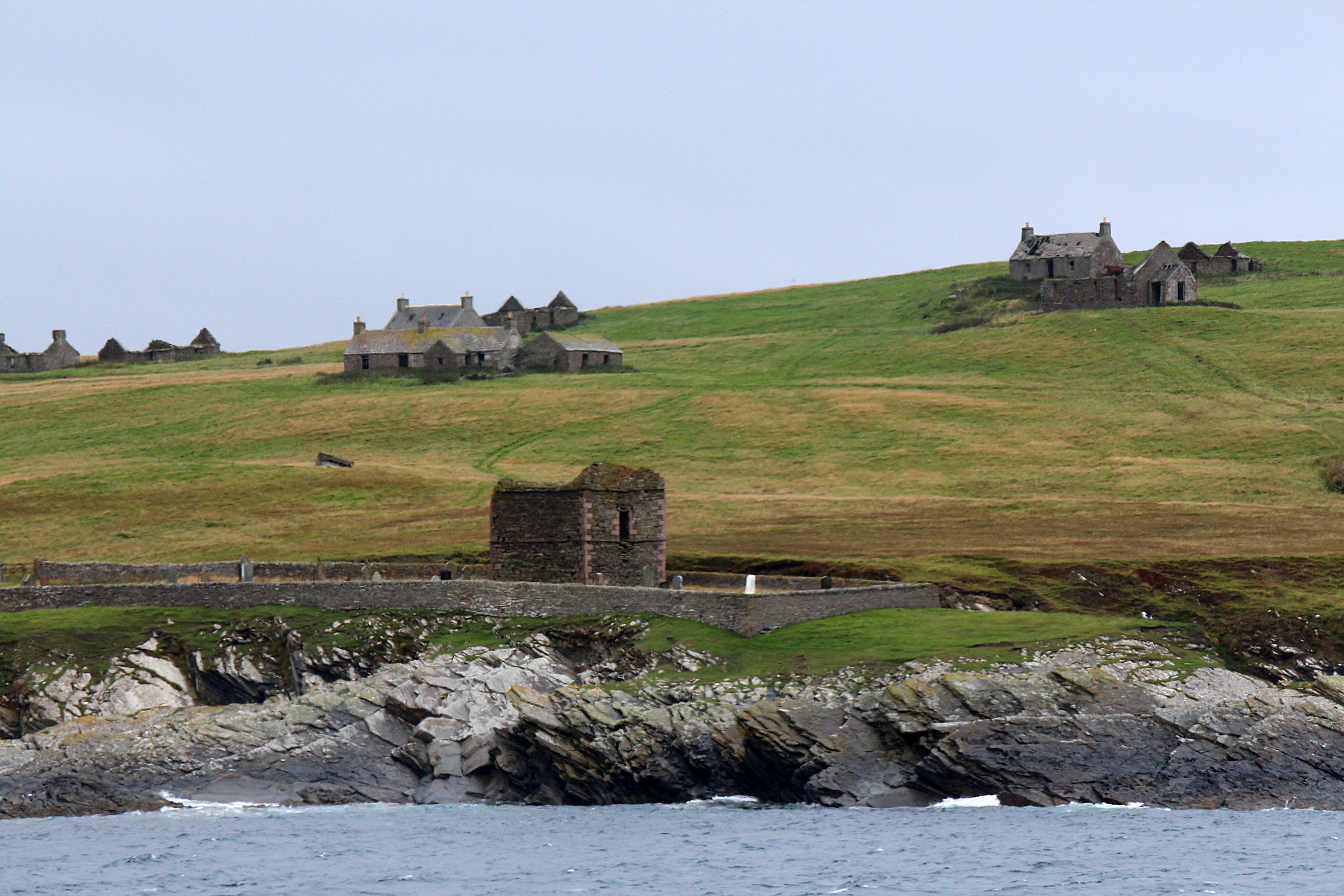
The 17th-century Kennedy mausoleum and graveyard on the island's south-eastern tip

By the early 19th century, around 30 families numbering 170 people lived on Stroma, farming land allocated on the traditional run rig system. The island was said to be "very productive in corn", though the inhabitants did not make use of ploughs; instead, they dug high beds or ridges, which produced greater yields than ploughing would have. George Low wrote in his 1774 account of the island that "the soil is good, black and deep, thrown up into high ridges by the spade, in a word the whole cultivated part of the Island is dressed like a garden and produces far greater crops than are common on plowed ground." Agricultural life on the island followed a fairly typical crofting pattern, with the average Stroma croft being about 10 acres (4 hectares) in size. Families usually kept a few cows, sheep and hens, along with a single horse and pig. They grew a variety of crops such as oats, potatoes, hay and turnips, obtained water from wells and used horses to meet their transportation needs. As well as agricultural exports, they also exported flagstones from the island and imported peat to burn as fuel; they were dismissive of the practice in some of the Orkney Islands of using cow dung as fuel, referring to the northern island of Sanday as "the little island where the coos shit fire". Low observed the effect of the island's climate on the inhabitants: "The men are stout hardy spadesmen as was said before, the women while young are tolerably well looked, but as they advance in age grow very hard favoured, acquiring a peculiar ghastliness in their countenances contrary to what is observed of the women in Orkney."

The islanders also supported themselves through fishing, exploiting the high-quality catches that were to be made around the island's coasts. James Traill Calder wrote in his 1861 Sketch of the Civil and Traditional History of Caithness that "The finest cod in the north is to be got in the Pentland Firth ... Large and excellent lobsters are caught around the island [of Stroma]." It was said that the cod had "the firmest white flesh of any caught from British waters due to having to continuously swim in strong currents." As well as trapping lobsters, the islanders practised hand line cod fishing in the waters of the Firth. This involved towing lengths of line with heavy weights and a metal rod or sprool at one end, from which hung a short length of hemp and hook baited with limpets. To encourage the fish to bite, the boats had to be held still by their rowers, which required great skill in the Firth's unpredictable currents. The island was noted for its native type of boat, the Stroma yole, which was a direct descendant of the old Norse longship.

Many of the male islanders utilised their knowledge of the Firth's currents to hire themselves out to passing vessels as maritime pilots. Their expertise was the product of a lifetime's experience on the waters of the Firth; as it was said, they had been "dabbling in salt water from their childhood upwards". Indeed, the whole island was drenched in salt water thrown up by the powerful tides and storms to which it was subjected, particularly in the winter. The Statistical Account of Scotland noted that during a storm the sea level on the west of the island was more than 2 fathoms (3.7 m; 12 ft) higher than on the east side, and that the spray was thrown so high that it washed over the cliff tops "and falls in such profusion as to run in rills to the opposite shore". The islanders took advantage of this phenomenon by capturing the water in a reservoir to power a watermill which ground their grain in the winter months. It is not now known exactly where the mill was or what happened to it. Although it is described in the Statistical Account, written in the 1790s, and a Robert Miller is listed in the 1851 census as its miller, by 1861 he had moved to farm a 5 acres (2.0 hectares) croft and no further mention is made of the mill in contemporary accounts.

Stroma's violent storms occasionally wrought destruction on the island. In December 1862, a great storm broke over the island with such force that it swept right across the northern end of Stroma, leaving wreckage, rocks and seaweed on the top of the 100-foot-high cliffs and destroying the channels leading to the watermill. However, the sea's destructive power had one positive benefit for the islanders, if not for those caught out by the currents and shoals of the Pentland Firth. Over the last two hundred years, over sixty vessels ranging from fishing boats to large cargo vessels have been wrecked on the shores of Stroma, with many more vessels coming to grief on the reefs and shoals of the neighbouring mainland and Orkney coasts. Many vessels – at least 560 between 1830 and 1990 – have had to be refloated in the Pentland Firth after getting into difficulties. Shipwrecks were a valuable source of income, timber and goods for the islanders, who would salvage liberally – and often with little regard for legality – whenever a stranded ship was abandoned. The building of Stroma's first lighthouse in the late 19th century was initially opposed by some of the islanders who were more concerned with profiting from shipwrecks than preventing them.

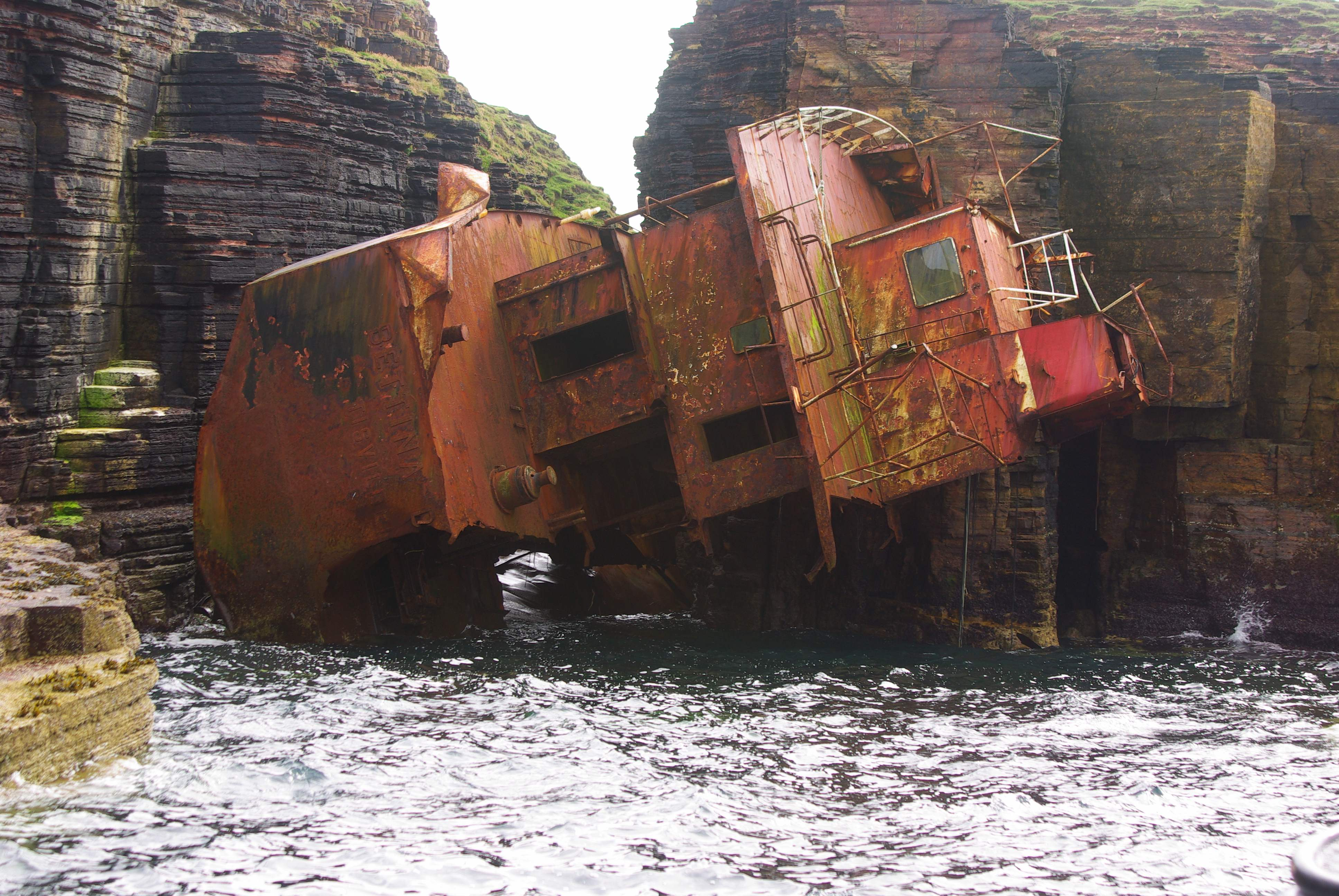
A casualty of the Pentland Firth: the stern of the Bettina Danica, wrecked on Stroma in 1993

The shipwrecks continued, nonetheless, with one of the most profitable of all being the 1931 wreck of the 6,000-ton Danish freighter Pennsylvania on the neighbouring island of Swona. The vessel was plundered by the inhabitants of Stroma, Swona and South Ronaldsay. Much of her cargo of slot machines, spark plugs, clothing, tobacco, watches and car parts was looted and concealed in haystacks, oatfields, lochs and caves. David Stogdon, a lifeboatman, recalled seeing what the islanders did with their illicit salvage: "Every house was stuffed with wreck [salvage] ... clocks, telescopes, binnacles ... I seem to remember enormous dining-room tables in small cottages. And then of course from time to time they'd have cargo parts of lorries or something like that which could be put together to make a lorry and taken ashore on two or three fishing boats in calm weather. They'd land it quietly somewhere, drive it along and sell it." Customs officers, policemen, coastguards and Receivers of Wreck were not generally welcome – the island had no police force – and the islanders let it be understood that unfortunate things could happen to the boats of unwanted visitors: "Police boats could go missing, develop an unexpected leak or spontaneously combust." The area still presents hazards to passing ships; in January 1993, the Danish coaster Bettina Danica ran aground off the southern end of Stroma. The wreck was broken apart by the action of the sea in 1997 and only her stern section is still visible.

Another way the islanders supported themselves was through the illicit brewing of spirits as a way of boosting their income – a common practice among the older people. An inspector who visited the island's school in 1824 described the inhabitants of Stroma as "all professed smugglers". The suppression of smuggling by the authorities led to a significant drop in the island's population the first half of the 19th century. The census of 1841 noted: "now smuggling being completely suppressed, several families have left the island and removed to the Orkneys to follow more lawful pursuits." While smuggling may have been tackled, illicit distilling continued for many years. One former inhabitant, Mrs. David Gunn, recalled in 1971 how her great-grandmother had managed to avoid the "excisemen" (customs officers) confiscating her illegally brewed alcohol:

My great-granny, a woman Kirsty Banks frae Stroma – she wesna supposed to be very clever, but faith! She hed all her wits boot her. They used to dae a bit o distillin in that time, on their own of coorse, and wan time they hed a browst ready, fan they heird 'at 'e excisemen were comin. Noo she'd hedden a stillborn bairn no long afore 'at, an 'e excisemen kent 'at. And they'd no time til hide 'e malt. So she telt 'e bairns til make up a bed til her in 'e kitchen, and til put 'e malt in 'e bed, and she wes lyin on 'at fan 'e excisemen came in. And she telt them 'at she'd hidden a stillborn bairn no long afore 'at, and she wisna feelin very weil, but 'e bairns wanted her in 'e kitchen, til guide them and tell them fat til do. And 'e excisemen kent that was true, they kent she'd hedden a bairn. So they searched 'e rest o the hoose, but they didna touch 'e bed, and they got off wi' it.

Despite their physical isolation, the islanders maintained a lively community. A school had been established in 1723 by the Society in Scotland for Propagating Christian Knowledge (SSPCK), with sixty children on its initial attendance roll. The demands of island life conflicted to some extent with those of schooling. The SPCK's inspector found only eighteen out of seventy pupils present when he visited in 1824. He found that many of the children were fully occupied helping their families in summer and attended school only in winter. Two places of worship were built within a couple of years of each other, a Baptist chapel in 1877 and a Church of Scotland church in 1878 (at a cost of £900). Although they soon became focal elements of community life, there seems to have been some bad blood between the two congregations, perhaps due to a clash between the missionary zeal of local Baptists and the Calvinism of the Presbyterian Kirk.

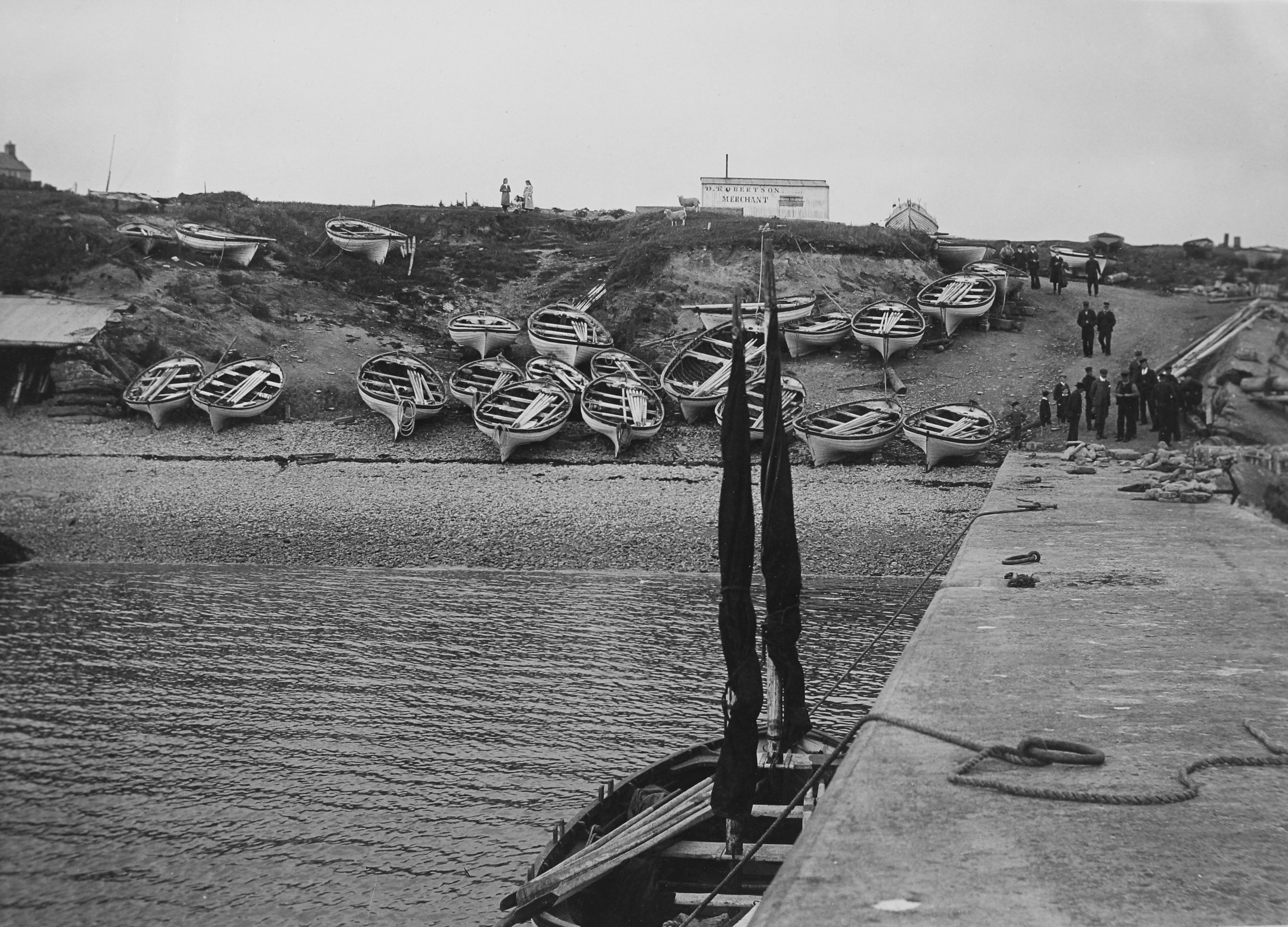
The pier and beach at Nethertown, Stroma, in July 1904

The inhabitants of Stroma were highly self-sufficient, and many practiced additional trades such as carpentry or roof-laying in addition to their "day jobs" in fishing or crofting. They built their own houses and boats, produced most of their own food, maintained farm equipment, shod their own horses, and made their own clothes, boots and shoes. In the 1920s they built their own wind turbines to recharge the batteries of their radio sets. By the end of the 19th century the island had three shops including a grocery. Any additional needs were met by purchasing supplies from shops at Wick and Thurso on the mainland or by mail-order from catalogues. For a while, they were also able to use the services of a floating shop which came periodically from Orkney to Stroma. Customers were rowed out to buy groceries, flour, animal feed, paraffin and clothes in exchange for lobsters, wet salted fish and eggs.

Most of the houses on Stroma are single-storey stone-built structures with two main rooms (a "butt" and a "ben" (Note: Traditionally the butt was the cooking area or kitchen, while the ben was an inner room.)) plus a closet (a small bedroom) and a porch. The rooms were small and simply furnished, incorporating recessed box beds. These consisted of a series of wooden planks with a layer of straw on top, on which was placed a chaff-filled mattress. The butt was used as a living room and included an iron stove with an oven, and sometimes a water tank to enable hot water to be generated, while the ben was used for visitors and as a sitting-room.

One former islander, Jimmy Simpson, recalled that "we had about two hundred and fifty folks here when I was a boy. It never seemed a lonely place. There were always people going in and out of each other's houses, there were forty children at the school and there were two teachers. We had concerts; three concerts in the winter when you had to sing loud to get above the sound of the wind. The young people would meet at the shop in the long, long evenings in summer." The island had some distinctively eccentric characters: Donald Banks, the island's coffin-maker, was known for quarrelling with his neighbours (telling one family, "I'll no bury any more o' ye!") and combining poetry with coffin-making, as in the order he placed with a mainland supplier:

Dear Mr. Sutherland,

Would you be so good,
To send eight planks of coffin wood.
Half inch lining, (dear Mr. Sutherland,)

For those who are pining ...

Describing life on Stroma, Simpson commented:

There would be about fifty houses or crofts, small crofts, but they were reckoned to be better off than the fisherman in, say, Wick or Keiss. They set the croft down before they went off on the herring fishing – the herring was a big industry in that days. When the men went to the herring fishing, they had the croft ploughed; the women fed the sheep and the cattle and milked the cow, and when they came home from the fishing they had tatties for the winter feed and then they cut their harvest. When the herring fishing was finished, it was harvest time — it was a seasonal fishing, and it suited the Stroma men perfectly because their wives attended to the crofts. You could say the women in Stroma were liberated well before women's lib. They'd got men's work to do – milk cows, make butter; they were very industrious women. And then when the husband comes home they'd have a fat pig to kill – that was your winter meat, all salted.

The Fishery Board for Scotland maintained statistics for Stroma. These seem to indicate that in the years before the First World War a declining number of fishermen with a smaller number of vessels succeeded in increasing the quantity and value of the catch:

Fishery Statistics

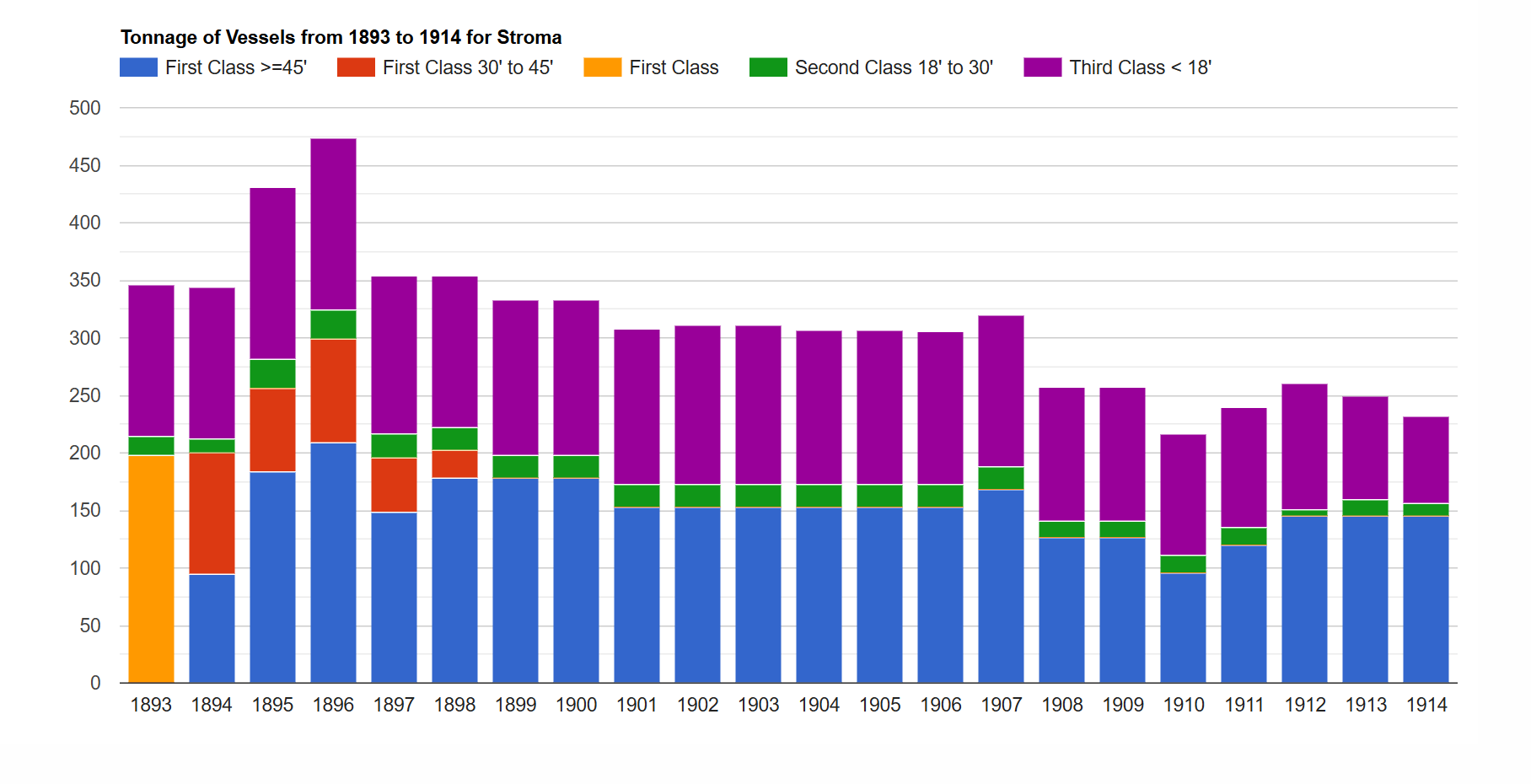
Tonnage of vessels

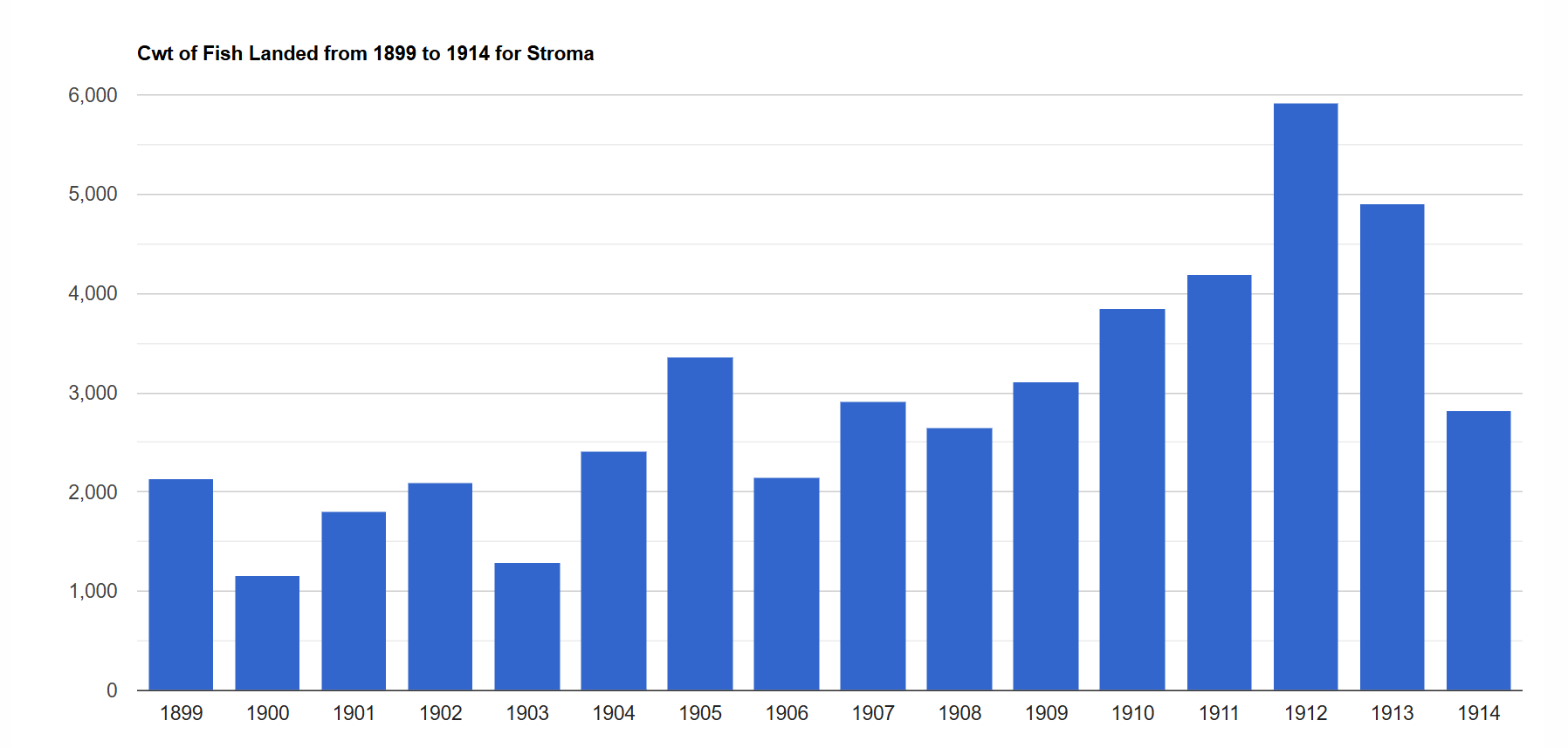
Cwt of fish landed

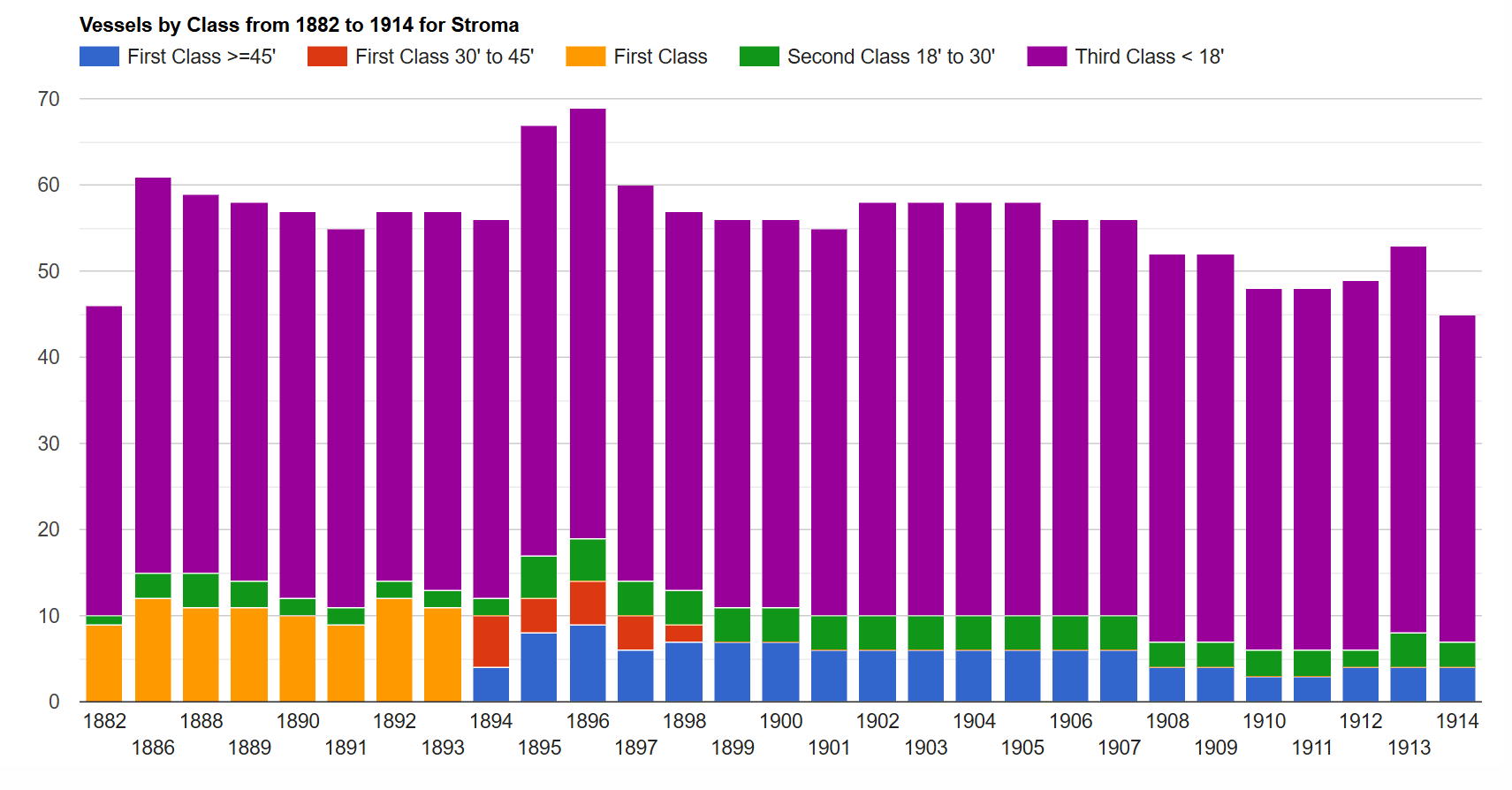
Vessels by class

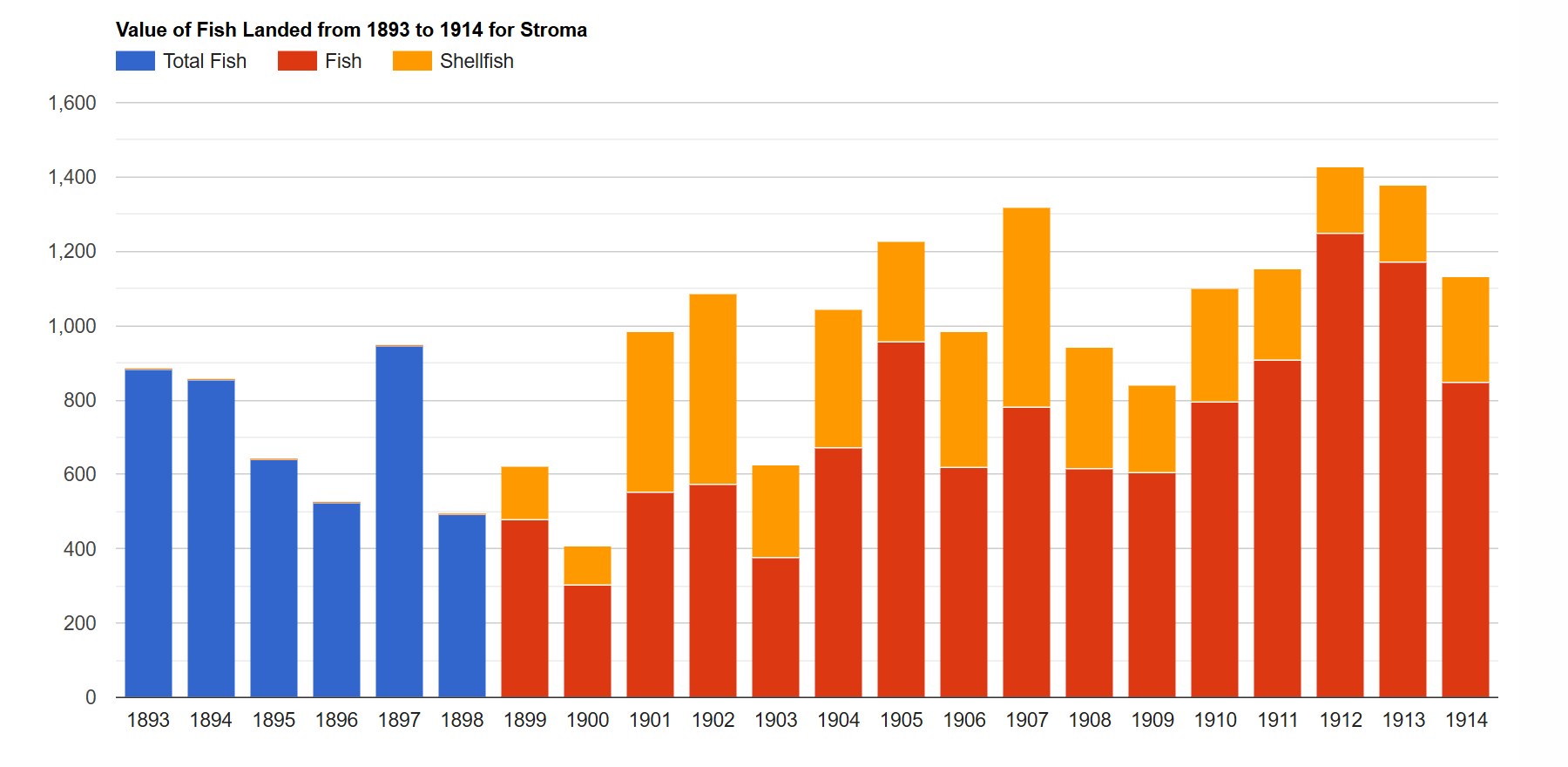
Value (£] of fish landed

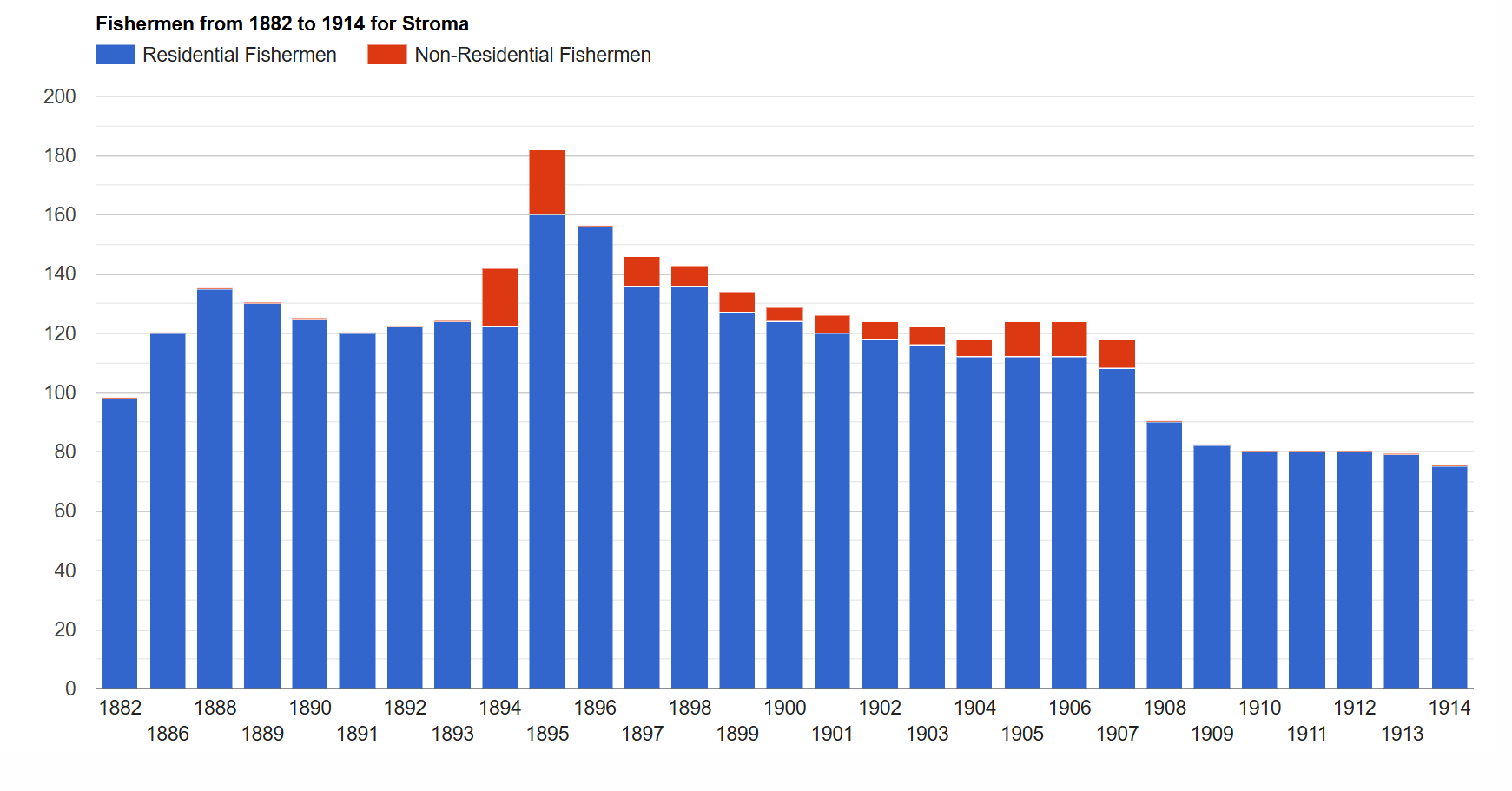
Fishermen

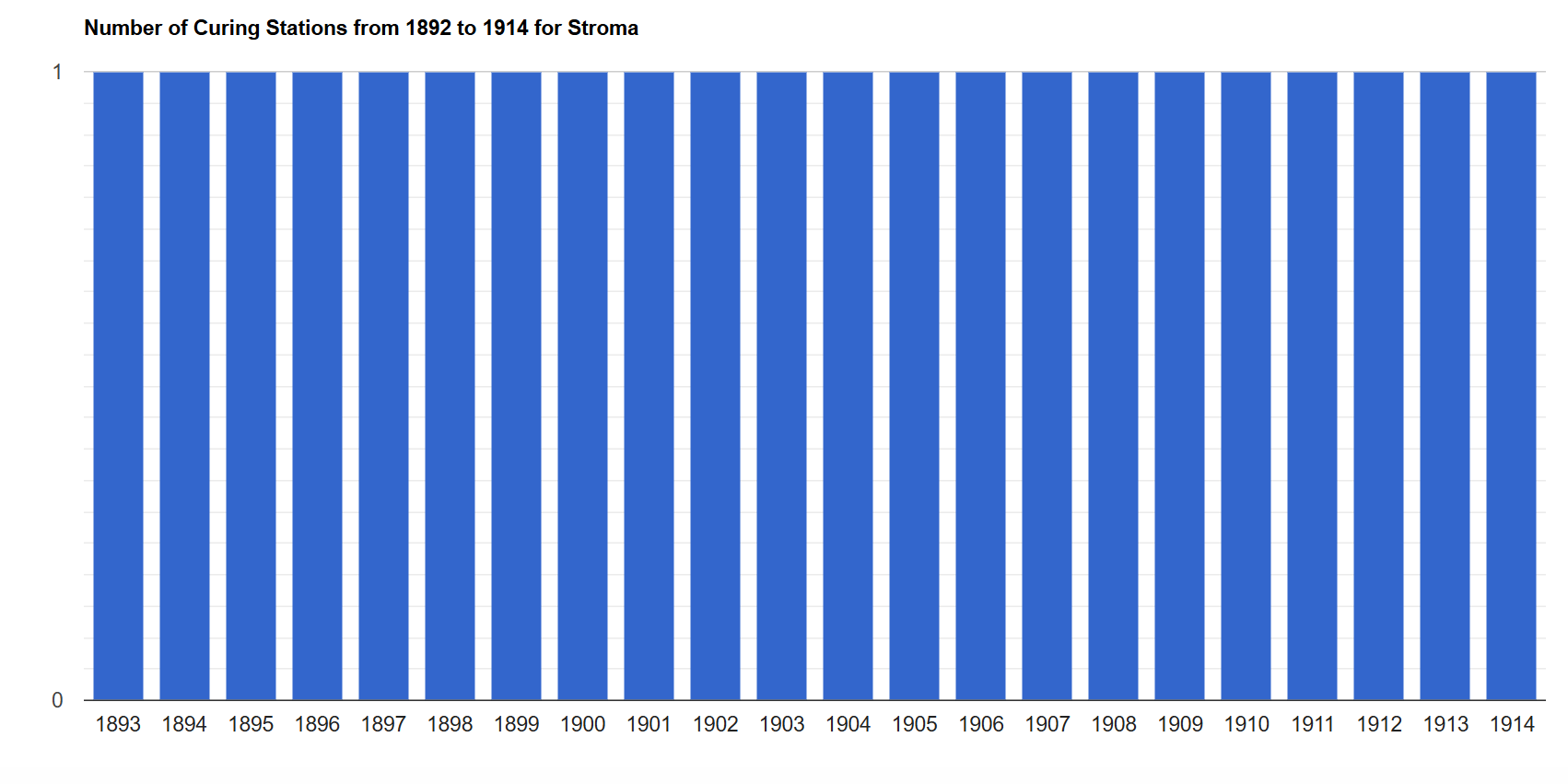
Number of curing stations (only one in this case!)

=== Decline and abandonment ===
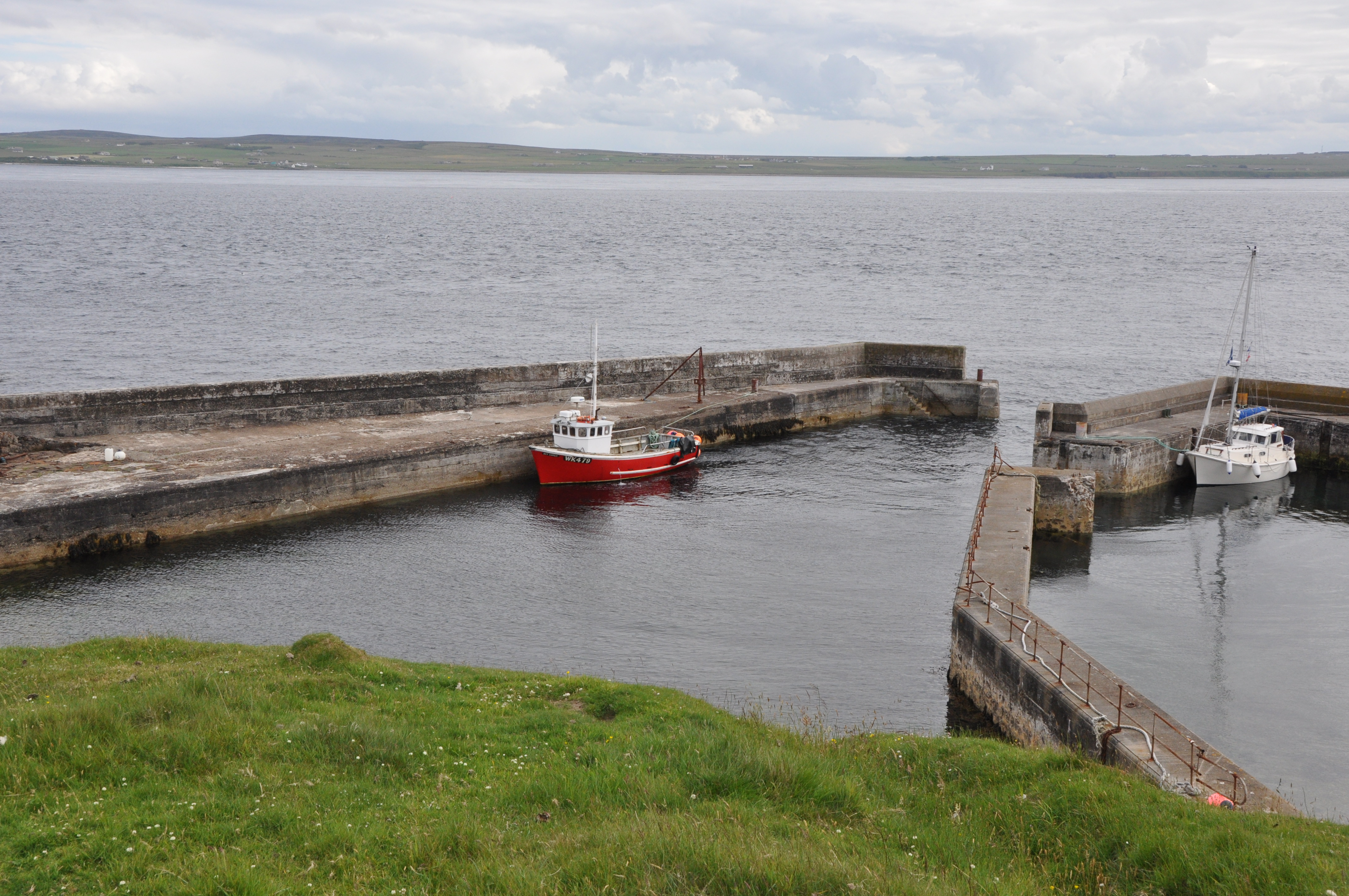
The harbour at Stroma, built in the 1950s in a failed attempt to prevent the final collapse of the island's population

Stroma's population fell precipitously through the first half of the 20th century, leading eventually to the island's final abandonment at the end of the 1950s. There was no single cause that precipitated the collapse of Stroma's population. Living conditions on the island were always basic; there was no running water or electricity, and gas arrived only in the 1950s, which contrasted poorly with the improvements being made on the mainland. The fishing deteriorated after the First World War, and crofting became an increasingly difficult way to make a living. The island was relatively overpopulated; by 1901 the population was nearly twice that of sixty years previously, and there was little spare land left for farming. Families of six to eight children were common, but there was simply not enough work for all, so the eldest often left for the mainland or emigrated to Canada or the United States to find work. The lack of a proper harbour meant that the islanders could not make use of larger boats or develop a modern fishery. Young people started moving away to seek better-paying opportunities elsewhere, eventually followed by their parents.

Both of the World Wars had a major impact on Stroma, which was only 12 miles (19 kilometres) from the Royal Navy's chief base at Scapa Flow in Orkney. Six islanders died in each of the World Wars; the names of all twelve are inscribed on the island's war memorial, and during the Second World War as much as a quarter of the population was on war service. Adding to the island's economic problems, the introduction of compulsory secondary education in 1944 meant that all children from the age of 12 upwards had to leave Stroma to complete their education at the secondary school in Wick. Because they could not commute between the island and Wick, they had to attend school as boarders, which incurred additional expenses for their parents.

Two other factors have often been cited in Stroma's depopulation: the building of the nuclear power station at nearby Dounreay in the 1950s, which created many new jobs on the mainland, and in the same decade the construction of a harbour on Stroma on which many islanders were employed. Although it has been claimed that this gave the islanders the incentive (and the means) to leave, local historian Donald A. Young points out that of islanders who left after 1945, only one went directly from Stroma to Dounreay. Most of the rest either continued fishing or carried on crofting on the mainland, while others found alternative jobs. Some ex-islanders eventually found jobs at Dounreay, but they had already moved to the mainland for work or education.

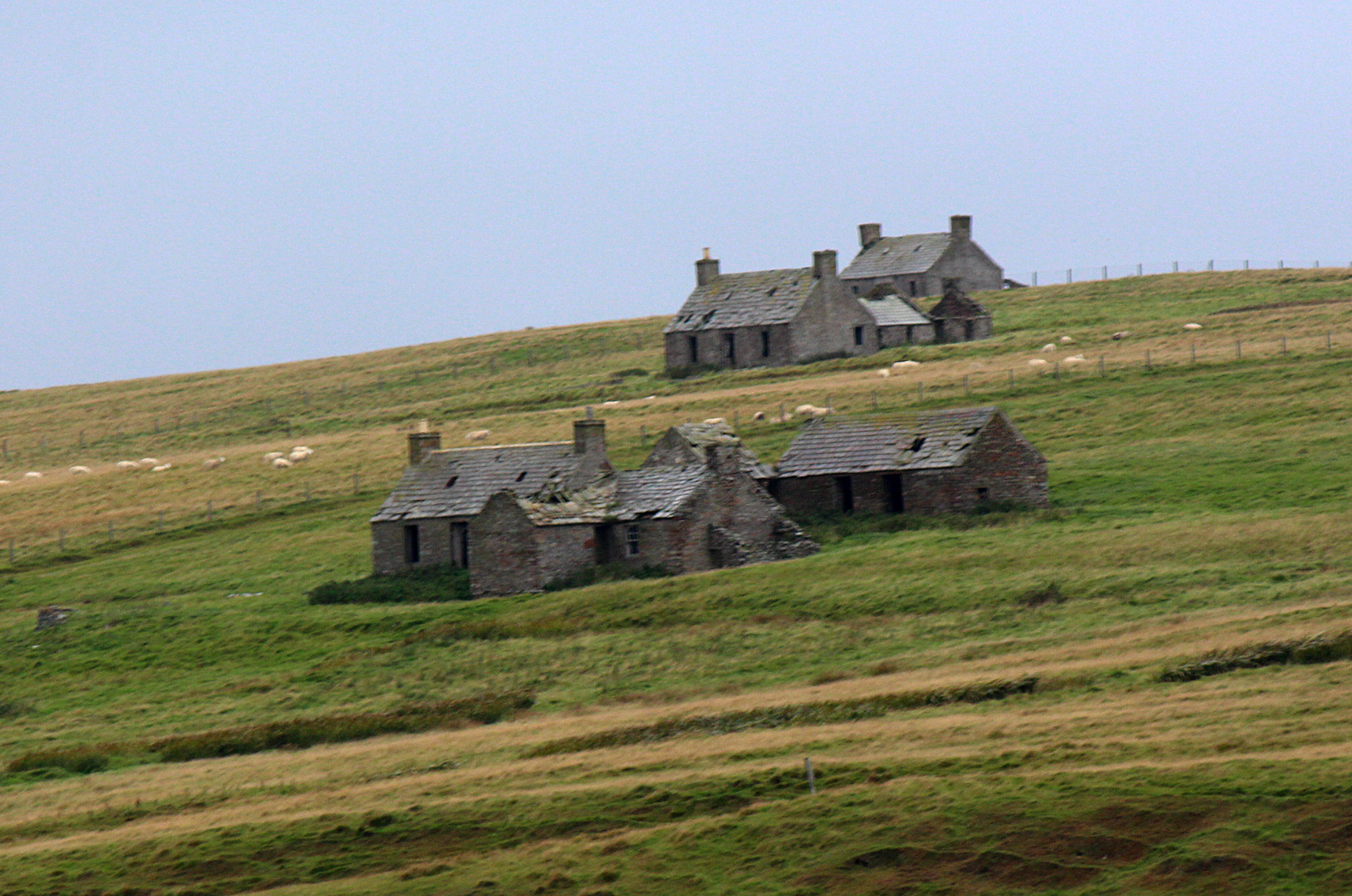
Ruined houses on Stroma

The Sinclairs of Mey sold their portion of the island to Colonel F. B. Imbert-Terry in 1929, who sold it in turn to John Hoyland, an umbrella manufacturer from Yorkshire, in 1947. Hoyland also acquired the remaining island estate of the Sinclairs of Freswick, uniting Stroma for a reported cost of £4,000. His tenure coincided with the final collapse of the island's population. As the tenants left, Hoyland put Stroma on the market but found no buyers. A Caithness councilman suggested various schemes for Stroma, including establishing a naturist resort and using it as a site for a crematorium, but the council rejected suggestions that it should take on responsibility for the island. As the population left, the local economy disintegrated; there were no longer enough able-bodied men to man the fishing boats, and the remaining facilities on the island were closed down for lack of custom. The last store on the island, the Scottish Cooperative Wholesale Society shop, closed in 1956. Only three families, numbering 16 people in total, were left by 1957; that year, the island's school closed, by which time it had only two pupils. The Post Office closed in 1958 when the family which operated it left for the mainland.

In the summer of 1958, Hoyland prompted controversy by offering the island to the American TV quiz show Bid 'n' Buy as a prize. After an outcry on both sides of the Atlantic, the show's producers settled for offering a car instead. In December 1960, he sold Stroma to Jimmy Simpson, an islander whose family had moved to farm on the mainland near the Castle of Mey in 1943. Simpson had not originally intended to buy the island but happened to be talking about it with a lawyer: "I said, 'I see Stroma was sold last week, and it's not sold this week. Is it on the market?' 'Yes,' he said, 'Stroma's for sale.' I said, 'What kind of money?' So he told me what kind of money, and there and then, the lawyer wrote that I, James Simpson, offered to buy the island of Stroma at a certain figure, and I signed my name at the end of it." His wife was not enthusiastic about the purchase: "Lena nearly flew at me for being so stupid. She says, 'Stroma? What on earth are you going to do with an island?'". He was successful in his bid and used the island to graze his animals, repopulating it with around 200 sheep and 30 cattle. It is still used by the Simpson family for sheep grazing.

By this time, the five-member Manson family had become the last native inhabitants of Stroma, "Now liv[ing] in a silent community of empty houses, an empty church and an empty school." Although the head of the family, Andrew Manson, called the island "a paradise in summer" and a place where he was "free of outside distractions and watching my sons growing from boyhood to manhood – teaching them to live like men, to be dependent on no one," it was a bleak life for the women, who had applied for a council house at Scrabster, near Thurso. The Mansons finally left Stroma on 6 December 1962, bringing to an end thousands of years of permanent habitation on the island.

=== Island of ruins ===
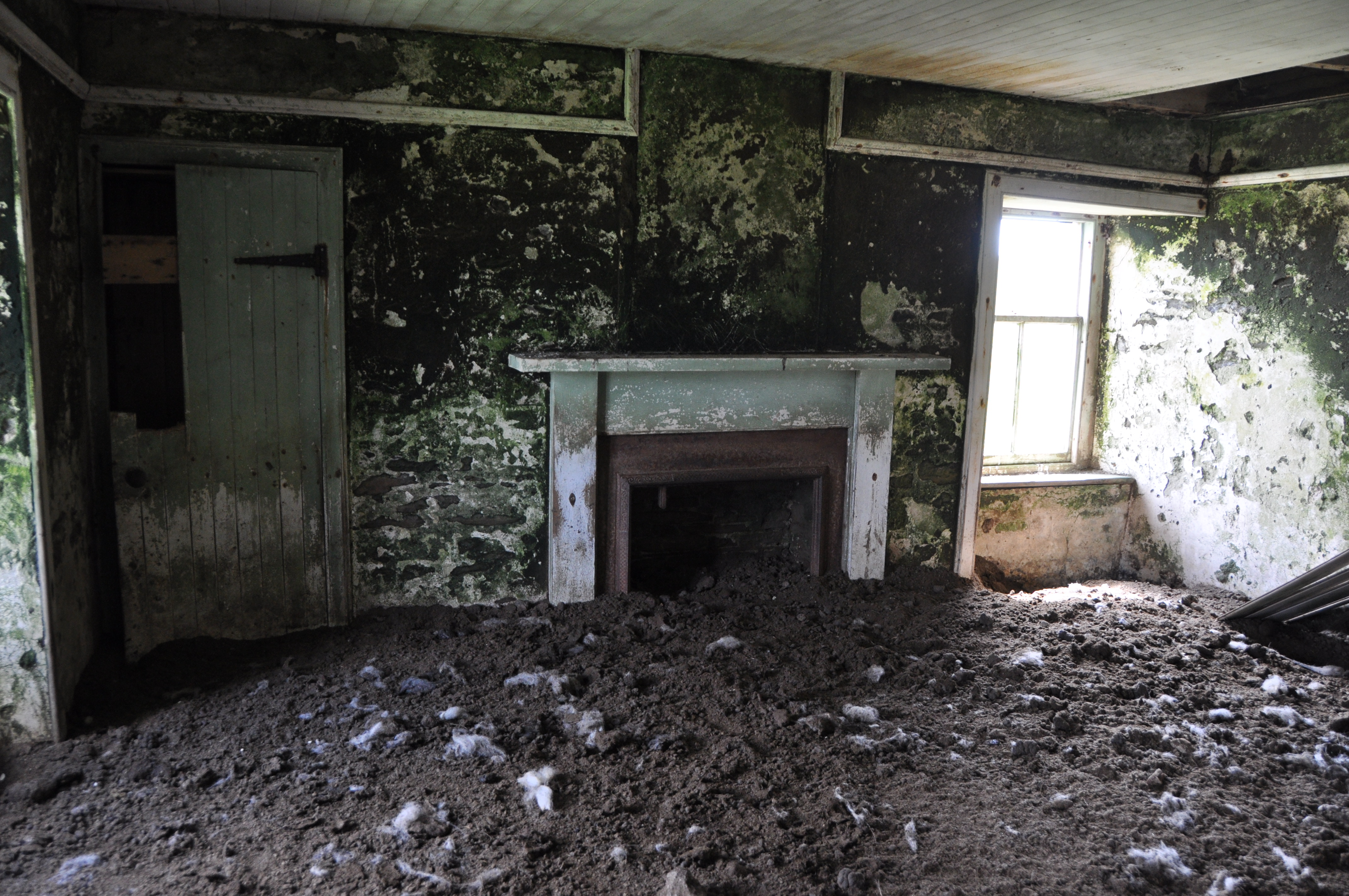
Interior of an abandoned house on Stroma

Stroma is now entirely deserted by humans; its only permanent inhabitants are the seals, birds and sheep that live on the island. The church, school and old croft houses stand derelict, with many having fallen into ruin. The writer Bella Bathurst, visiting the island in the early 2010s, described the scene:

The houses along the main road down the spine of the island seem to have rotted at different rates. Those crofts, which have somehow managed to keep their glazing and their roof-slates, are in much better condition than the others. In some, the furniture is still laid out as if only recently abandoned: iron bedsteads with mattresses, tables, armchairs, cupboards full of boots and bottles, everything arranged with the same care and compaction as it would be on a boat. But most crofts have already lost the war with the weather. As soon as the tiles go, the damp begins to sidle into the mortaring; within a couple of years all that is left are a few bony ribs and the stark gable ends.

Inside some of the houses, Bathurst writes, everyday objects still remain where they were left decades ago; "the bed and the limed matchboard ceiling are intact, untouched even by the damp. The kitchen table still stands in the parlour and a framed and fading photograph gazes out from the top of the mantelpiece." In another house seen 20 years earlier by Leslie Thomas, "was a rank of family photographs, shades in Victorian dress staring out forever into a room now desolate and holed, but which had once held the life of a warm family."

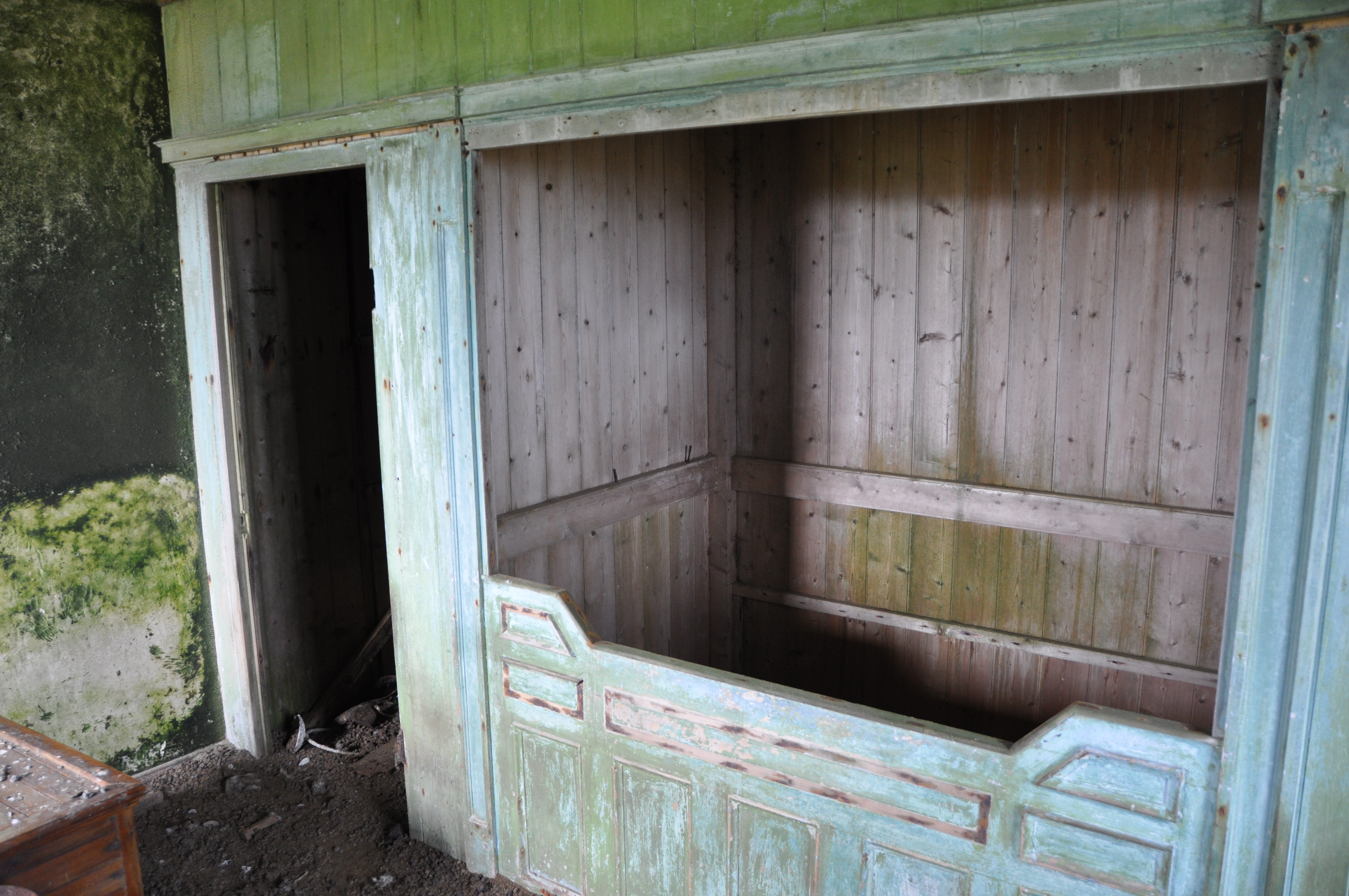
An inset box bed in one of Stroma's abandoned houses

Elsewhere, the books remain "dusty but tidy" in the abandoned school, and the church still contains its pulpit, "dumb and hung with ragged red tassles" with prayer books "left to be trampled upon by heathen sheep and nibbled by rabbits and rats." In the former post office, forms and licence applications and a bottle of dried ink still stand on the counter, while in a back room stands "a nice dresser, upon which [stands] a teapot and a jug and some sheet music: 'Red Sails in the Sunset', 'The General's Fast Asleep' and 'You Can't Do That There 'Ere.' Nobody on Stroma will ever sing those songs now."

Bathurst and Thomas express contrasting views on the significance of Stroma's abandonment. Thomas regards it as a tragedy: "Of all the out-of-the-way places I have known, this was the saddest. It seemed as though its life had been ended in a fit of pique." To Bathurst, however, "it is tempting to see Stroma's abandonment as the result of some appalling trauma. Abandonment is always taken as a sign of failure, a collective death ... But Stroma does not feel sad. True, there is sorrow in seeing the once meticulous vegetable patches turned over to weeds, or wondering how many more winters the box beds will stand before they start to rot. But that isn't the whole story. What is interesting about Stroma is not the fact of its abandonment, but the tale of its past."

The MeyGen tidal energy array is located on the ocean floor to the south of the island of Stroma. It has four 1.5 MW tidal turbines, which harness the power of the fast-flowing waters of the Inner Sound. They produced 25 GWh of electrical energy in 2019, enough to supply the electric needs of 4,000 homes. The project is being developed in a phased manner, with a potential capacity of 400 MW.

== Communications ==
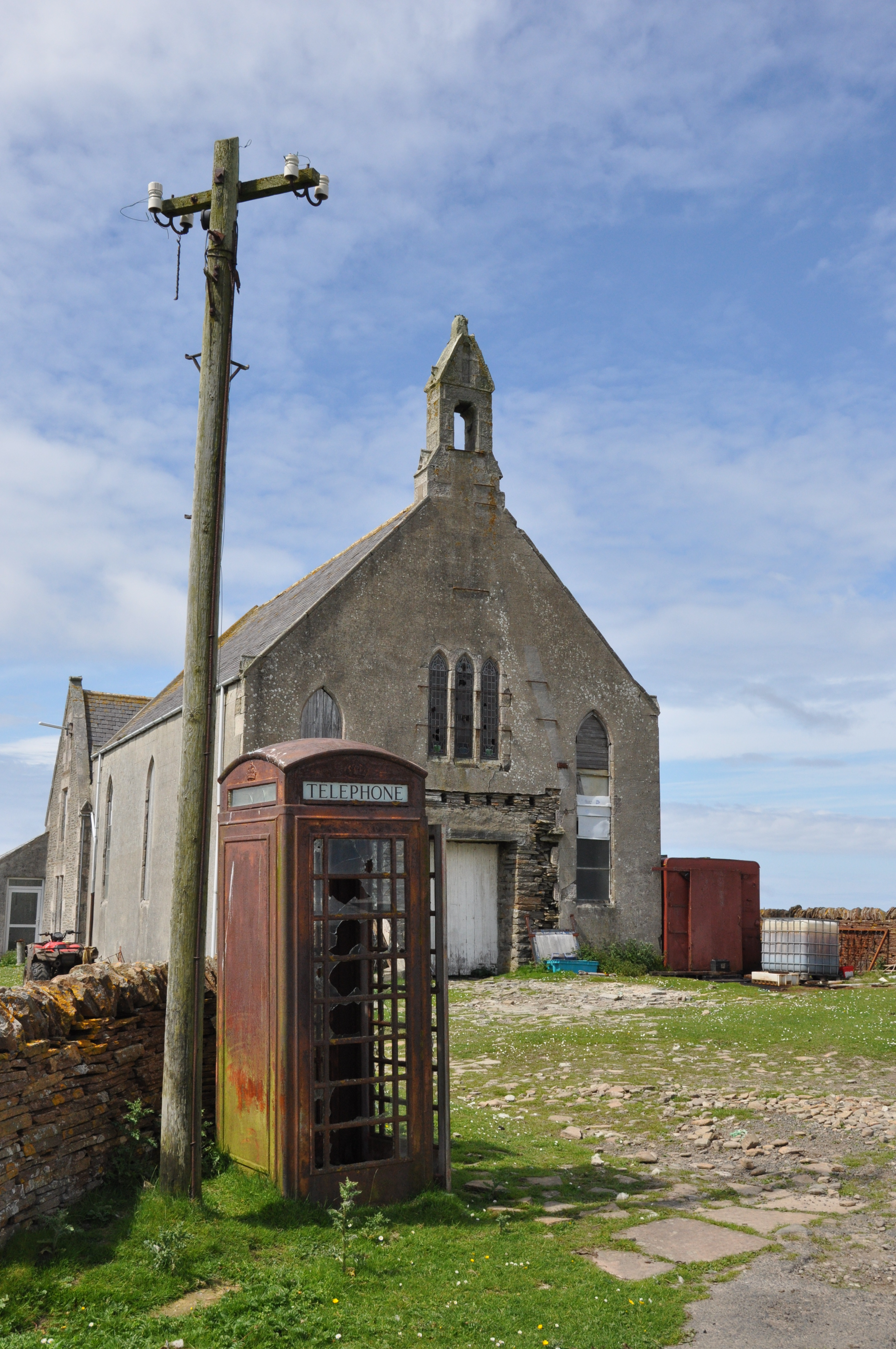
The island's disused church and phone box

Stroma lacked a regular connection to the mainland until 1879, when the General Post Office subsidised a weekly boat service from Huna on the mainland and established a post office on the island. However, the volume of mail sent from Stroma proved so small that the service was grossly uneconomical. By the 1950s, the Post Office was spending 1s. 2d. for each letter worth 2½d. in postage.

For many years, the islanders had no means of contacting the mainland in emergencies other than signalling with hand lamps and hoping that someone would see them. A radio telephone was installed in 1935, and in 1953; a telephone cable was laid. A red telephone box was installed in the centre of the island, symbolic of the six-millionth phone box installation in the UK. It is still there today, though no longer in use due to the abandonment of the island.

It was not until 1894 that Stroma gained its first artificial landing point, a pier built from Portland cement near Nethertown at a cost of £800 (equivalent to around £90,000 in 2025). In 1955, Caithness County Council constructed a new harbour on the south coast of the island at a cost of £28,500 (equivalent to around £650,000 in 2025). Although it was intended to help stem the exodus of people from the island, Stroma was abandoned only a few years after the harbour's completion.

In the late-1930s, Highland Airways looked into the possibility of including Stroma in the hospital ambulance plane service that was then in operation. On 19 August 1937, Captain E. E. Fresson of Highland Airways landed a small aircraft in farmland adjoining the Mains of Stroma, and the following spring the islanders cleared an area of moorland on the west side of the island to create an airstrip. The first official flight landed in June 1938. However, the Second World War prevented any further developments and a regular service was never established. After the war, Highland Airways was taken over by British European Airways, which abandoned any interest in serving the island.

Today, due to a lack of need, Stroma has no regular communications with the mainland. The island's owner ran occasional boat trips there on weekends for visitors, including then-Prince Charles, who painted watercolours of the abandoned houses.

== Notable buildings ==
=== Lighthouse ===
Stroma Lighthouse Swilkie Point
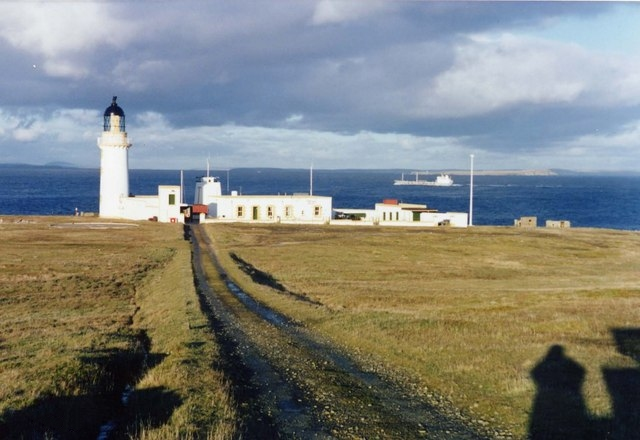
- Stroma Lighthouse
- Location: Stroma Island; 2 mi (3 km) north of Gills Bay; Caithness; Scotland; United Kingdom
- Coordinates: 58°41′45.2″N 03°07′00.1″W

Tower
- Constructed: 1890
- Built by: Charles Alexander Stevenson, David Alan Stevenson
- Construction: masonry tower
- Automated: 1997
- Height: 23 m (75 ft)
- Shape: cylindrical tower with balcony and lantern attached to 1-storey keeper's house
- Markings: white tower, black lantern, ochre trim
- Operator: Northern Lighthouse Board

Light
- Focal height: 32 m (105 ft)
- Range: 26 nmi (48 km)
- Characteristic: Fl (2) W 20s.

In 1890, a lighthouse was built at Stroma's northern tip, Langaton Point. It was operational for only six years before being replaced, and very little is now known about the structure. The unmanned lighthouse originally housed a Trotter-Lindberg lamp which burned petroleum spirit or lythene. The fuel supply was stored in cisterns near the lantern, which was regularly recharged at least fortnightly by the local fishermen or crofters. It was one of the first lighthouses in Scotland to use this type of "scintillating" light.

It was replaced in 1896, possibly on the same site, by a new lighthouse built to a design by David Stevenson as part of a major programme of construction works around northern Scotland. A fog warning system was installed the following year. Stevenson's lighthouse consists of a circular white-painted stone tower standing 23 m (75 ft) high at an elevation of 32 m (105 ft) above Mean High Water with a number of buildings nearby to house generators and the lighthouse keepers. The light was converted to a paraffin lamp when the former lythene lamp was found to be unsuitable. An oil store was installed in the lighthouse tower, ending the need for a separate building to hold the fuel. The lighthouse was subjected to a machine-gun attack by a German aircraft on 22 February 1941. It caused little damage and no injuries, and the keepers were soon able to make repairs.

Until 1961 the lighthouse was administered as a shore station, and subsequently (after the resident population of Stroma had left) as a rock station. An electric lamp with a maximum power of 1.1 million cp was installed in 1972, utilising a sealed beam optic mounted on a gearless revolving pedestal. By this time the keepers and their families were the only people living on Stroma. A helicopter pad was installed to enable supplies and personnel to be flown in. In 1997 the station was converted to automatic operation, utilising a 250-watt metal halide lamp which rotates on a gearless pedestal. A lens system from Sule Skerry lighthouse was refitted in the Stroma lighthouse. The old air-driven fog horn was removed and replaced by an electric fog signal which is installed on the balcony of the lighthouse. The lighthouse station's power, which was formerly obtained from generators, is now provided by batteries which are charged at regular intervals. The current light flashes white every 20 seconds and can be seen from a nominal range of 26 nautical miles (48 kilometres).

=== Kennedy mausoleum and the mummies of Stroma ===
One curious side-effect of the constant spray of sea-water over Stroma – apart from making the drinking water brackish and giving the air a constant salt taste – was that it mummified the corpses of some of the island's inhabitants. They were housed in a mausoleum in the south-east corner of Stroma, built by the Kennedy family in 1677. The building still stands, although it is now unroofed. It comprises a two-storey structure which incorporates a burial vault and a dovecote. The building was constructed from grey flagstones and pink sandstone quoins. It measures 25 ft (7.6 m) by 18 ft 5 in (5.6 m) externally and standing 22 ft (6.7 m) high. The lintel of the door bears the inscription "I.K." (Ioannes [i.e. John] Kennedy) and the date 1677.

The mummies of Stroma were something of a tourist attraction in the 18th century. The Welsh naturalist and traveller Thomas Pennant described the mummies as "entire and uncorrupted bodies of persons who had been dead sixty years. I was informed that they were very light, had a flexibility in their limbs and were of a dusky color." However, their popularity proved their undoing. In 1762 Bishop of Ross and Caithness Robert Forbes recorded in his journal that Murdoch Kennedy

... played such wretched tricks on the Body of his Father, for the Diversion of Strangers, as in time broke it to pieces, and the Head was the part that fell first off. He used to place Strangers at his Father's Feet, and by setting a Foot on one of his Father's, he made the Body spring up speedily and salute them, which surprized [sic] them greatly. Then, after laying the body down again, he beat a march upon the Belly, which sounded equally loud with a Drum.

By 1786 the mummies had been destroyed by cattle and careless visitors as, according to Walker's Hibernian Magazine, "curiosity to see the mummies had brought many idle people to Stroma, [and] that some, out of wantonness had shattered the door, and others the bodies; and the door not being repaired, sheep and cattle entered the vault, and trampled them to pieces." There is now no trace of the original burials in the vault.

== Visiting the island ==
There is currently no easy way for the public to visit the island, but there are plans for seasonal daily boat trips to start in the summer of 2026.

== See also ==
- List of islands of Scotland
- List of outlying islands of Scotland
- Mingulay
- St Kilda
