= Lydus (disambiguation) =

Lydus or Lydos is an adjective or a name based on the adjective for a person or other object from ancient Lydia. It can mean:

- Lydus, third king of Maeonia in succession to his father Atys
- Lydos, 6th century BC vase painter
- Lydus, John the Lydian, a 6th-century AD Byzantine administrator
- Lydus, a genus of blister beetle

== See also ==
- Lud (disambiguation)
