= Lud =

Lud or LUD may refer to:

- Local usage details, a record of local calls made from and received by a particular phone number
- Ludic language, a Finnic language spoken in Karelia

== People ==
- King Lud (Lud son of Heli), a legendary British king who in Geoffrey of Monmouth's pseudohistorical Historia Regum Britanniae founded London and was buried at Ludgate
- Lud, son of Shem, a grandson of Noah
- Lludd Llaw Eraint, a mythical Welsh figure cognate with king Nuada Airgetlám
- Lud Fiser (1908–1990), American football and baseball player and coach
- Lud Gluskin (1898–1989), Russian jazz bandleader
- Lud Kramer (1932–2004), American politician
- Ned Ludd, founder of the Luddite movement in 18th- and 19th-century Britain

== Places ==
- Lud River, a river of New Zealand's South Island
- Ludlow railway station, England
- River Lud, a river of England, canalised as the Louth Navigation
- Stone Lud, a standing stone in Caithness, in the Highland area of Scotland
- Lud Gate, a city gate in the London area of Ludgate
- Decatur Municipal Airport, in Decatur, Texas, FAA code
- Lüderitz Airport, Namibia, IATA code

== Fiction ==
- Lud (city), a city in Stephen King's Dark Tower series
- Lobby Lud, a character used in British newspaper scavenger hunts in the 1920s
- Lud-in-the-Mist, novel by British writer (Helen) Hope Mirrlees

== See also ==
- Ludd (disambiguation)
- Lod, a city in Israel (formerly Lydda)
