= Nudd =

Nudd may refer to:

- Bob Nudd (born 1944), British angler
- Gwyn ap Nudd, Welsh mythological figure, son of Lludd Llaw Eraint
- Lludd Llaw Eraint (Nudd Llaw Ereint), Welsh mythological hero
- Bishop Nudd, active in southeast Wales in the late ninth century

== See also ==
- Nud (disambiguation)
- Ludd (disambiguation)
- Nodens – Celtic deity
- Nuada Airgetlám – First king of the Tuatha Dé Danann in Irish mythology
