= Home farm (agriculture) =

In Great Britain and Ireland, a home farm (sometimes called a manor farm; in Scotland called a mains) is the part of a country estate retained for direct management by the landowner, estate manager, or institutional authority, rather than being leased or otherwise worked independently by tenant farmers. Typically located near the principal residence or administrative center, it supplied food, livestock, stabling, and other provisions for the household or institution.

In later medieval and modern contexts, home farms formed part of landed estates; in earlier periods, including the middle Anglo-Saxon period, the term may also be applied to centrally managed agricultural cores associated with royal or ecclesiastical centers. The name often persists after the land ceases to function as a home farm.
