= NUD =

NUD may stand for:

- En Nahud Airport's IATA airport code
- Neighbor unreachability detection, a functionality of the Neighbor Discovery Protocol
- Niue dollar
- Non-ulcer dyspepsia, also called functional dyspepsia

== See also ==
- Nudd (disambiguation)
