= James Traill Calder =

Scottish local historian

James Traill Calder (1794–1864) was a Scottish local historian who was the writer of a History of Caithness.

== Life ==
Born in Castletown, Caithness, Calder studied at the University of Edinburgh. After working as a private tutor for the Rev. Mr. Gunn at Caithness, Calder became the parish teacher at Canisbay.

Calder died at Elwick Bank, Shapinsay, Orkney, on 15 January 1864.

== Works ==
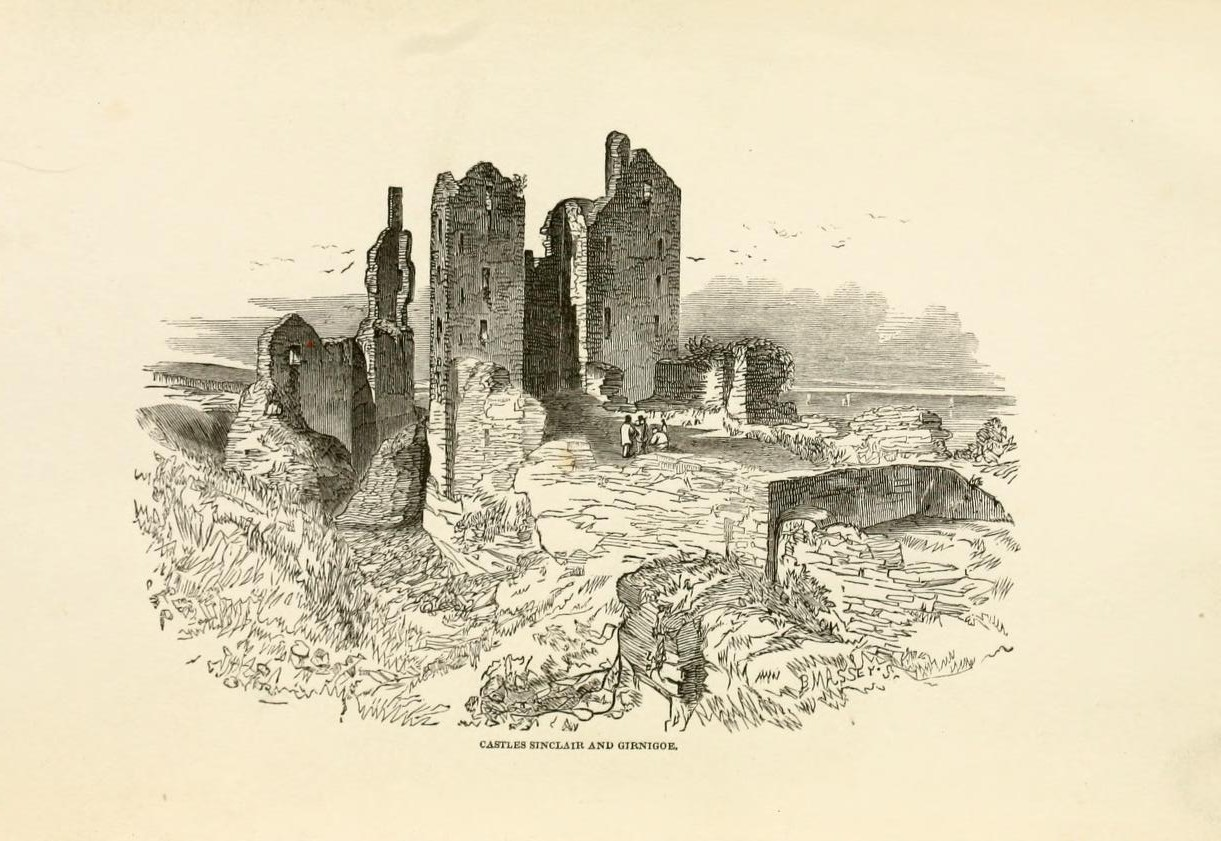
Castle Sinclair Girnigoe, illustration from Sketch of the Civil and Traditional History of Caithness from the Tenth Century (1861) by James Traill Calder

Calder's major work, Sketch of the Civil and Traditional History of Caithness from the Tenth Century, was published in 1861. According to the Oxford Dictionary of National Biography, it "remains a standard work".

In 1842 Calder published at Wick Sketches from John o' Groat's in Prose and Verse, which contained a chapter on "Ancient Superstitions and Customs in Caithness". In 1846, he published a volume of poems, The Soldier's Bride.

== Notes ==
Attribution

This article incorporates text from a publication now in the public domain: Stephen, Leslie, ed. (1886). "Calder, James Tait". Dictionary of National Biography. Vol. 8. London: Smith, Elder & Co.
