= Mains (Scotland) =

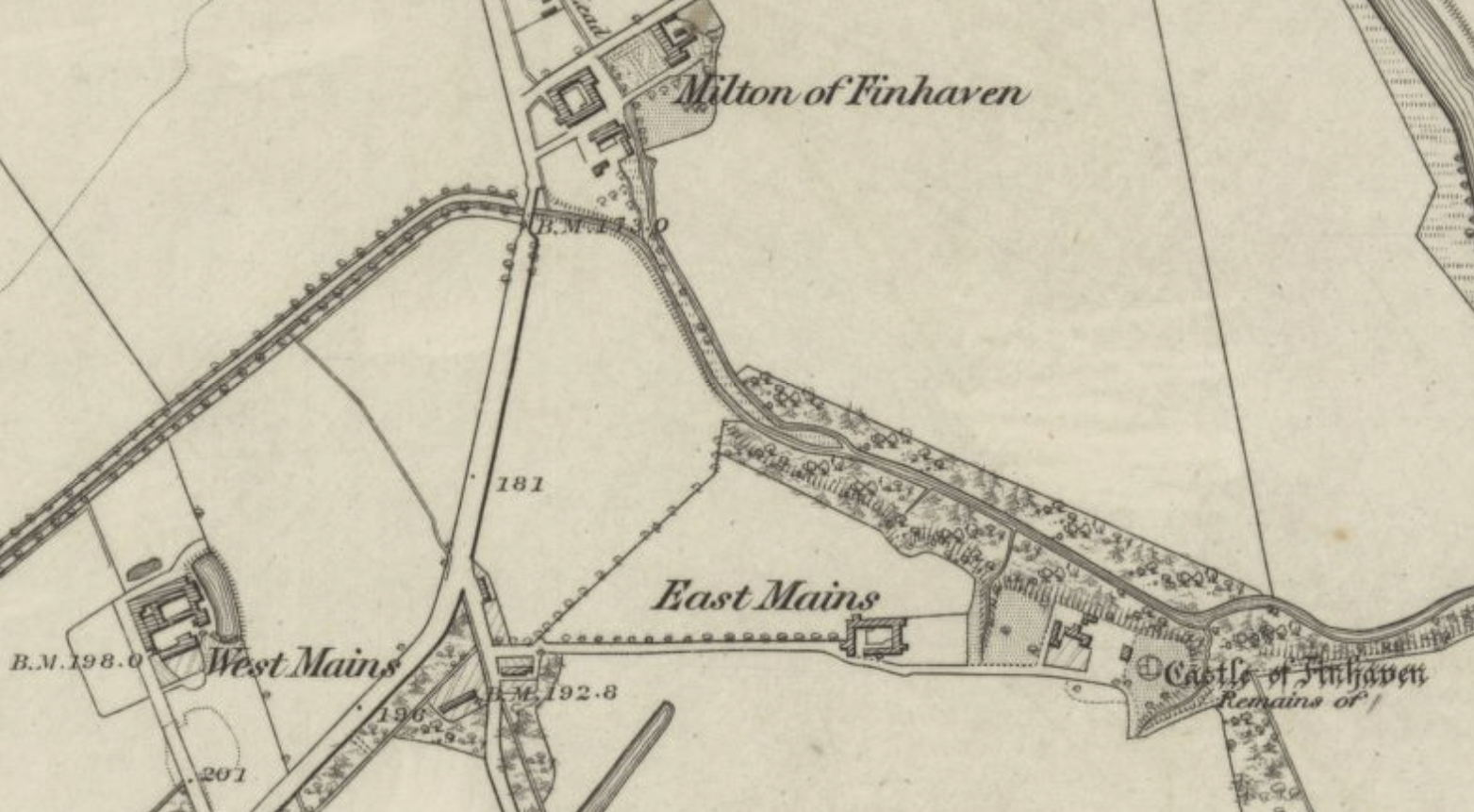
19th-century map showing Milton of Finavon House, Angus, with its East Mains and West Mains.

The mains (Scottish Gaelic: mànas) in Scotland is a farm, or the buildings of a farm. This may include the farmhouse, farm buildings such as a byre, dairy, and nearby workers' cottages. It is pseudo-plural, actually being a Lowland Scots corruption of domains or demesne, and so is never used in the form "main" (except occasionally in the tautological "main farm", although this usage is not traditional). The Mains is the principle farm on an estate. The farm manager living in the farmhouse at the Mains is called the Grieve. It is not uncommon to find situated on the estate: West Mains or East Mains. These are secondary farm steadings associated with the principle Mains.

== Definition ==
The mains was usually the principal farm on an estate, or at least the one with the most fertile ground. The rough equivalent in England would be a 'home farm' (or perhaps 'manor farm', but not a 'manor' or 'manor house'). The laird's house – if there was one – may have been nearby or some distance away, but is not usually considered part of the mains. Many mains remain as working farms, while others have been converted to residential accommodation. Sometimes the buildings and/or farm have disappeared altogether, and only the name of the location survives.

== Placenames ==
The word mains occurs frequently in Scottish placenames, most noticeably in the north east and east coast regions, extending down into East Lothian and Berwickshire, where examples include Auchencrow Mains, Blackadder Mains, and Hutton Mains. The usual form is "Mains of X", without the definite article "the", for example, "Mains of Hallhead". However, the best-known example of its use in a Scottish placename is Davidson's Mains, now a suburb of Edinburgh, which does not follow this form. Indeed, south of the M8, Mains almost invariably take the form "X Mains", as in "Mordington Mains".

The same word usage to occur in Northern England, and farm names of the form "X Mains" can be found in northern Northumberland. Examples here include Adderstone Mains, near Bamburgh, and Burradon Mains, a few miles north of Rothbury in the Vale of Whittingham. In some cases, new owners have renamed various "mains" to "manor" in ignorance of the distinction in Scotland. The media occasionally uses the tautology, "Mains of X farm". Locally, it will be referred to as "the mains".

== Others ==
Mains is also a family name and a sept of the Scottish clan Gunn.

== See also ==
- Townland
