= Local usage details =

Technical data of local telephone calls

Local usage details (LUD) are a detailed record of local calls made and received from a particular phone number. These records are regularly available to police in the United States and Canada with a court order, and were traditionally subject to the same restrictions as telephone tapping.

In the United States, LUDs may be legally used by the police without first obtaining a warrant, as determined by Smith v. Maryland (1979).

Other terms for call records include CDR (call detail records) or SMDR (station message detail recordings). These terms normally apply to "raw call records" before they have been processed to apply locations and rates.

== See also ==
- Pen register
