= Ludd =

Ludd can refer to:

- Ned Ludd, inspiration for the Luddite movement
- Lludd Llaw Eraint, figure in Welsh mythology
- Nuada, figure in Irish mythology
- Short for Luddite on the TV show Upload

== See also ==
- Lud (disambiguation)
- Lod, a city in Israel (formerly Lydda)
