= Castletown, Highland =

Village in Scotland

Coordinates: 58.59°N 3.38°W

Castletown: Scottish Gaelic: Baile a' Chaisteil
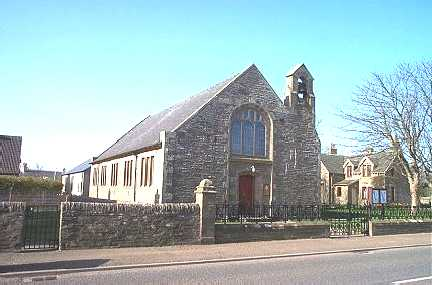
- Olrig Parish Church, Castletown

- Location within the Caithness area
- Population: 810 (2020)
- OS grid reference: ND196678
- Civil parish: Olrig
- Council area: Highland
- Lieutenancy area: Caithness
- Country: Scotland
- Sovereign state: United Kingdom
- Post town: THURSO
- Postcode district: KW14
- Dialling code: 01847
- Police: Scotland
- Fire: Scottish
- Ambulance: Scottish
- UK Parliament: Caithness, Sutherland and Easter Ross
- Scottish Parliament: Caithness, Sutherland and Ross

Castletown (Scottish Gaelic: Baile a' Chaisteil) is a village on the north coast of the Highland council area of Scotland, situated near Dunnet Bay. It is within the civil parish of Olrig, where it is the main settlement, and within the historic county of Caithness. The A836 links the village with Thurso and Tongue in the west and with John o' Groats in the east. The B876-A99 links the village with Wick in the southeast. Contrary to the common misconception, the name Castletown is a misnomer as there is no castle within the village limits.

Much of the village is built on the old townland (or fermland) of Stanergill. The Stanergill Burn was the eastern boundary of the townland. It flows now through the eastern end of the village and so into Dunnet Bay and the Atlantic Ocean.

The name Stanergill can be read as meaning Stone Valley and much of Castletown was built during the 19th century boom years of Caithness as a source of flagstone. Much of the stone was processed in the harbour area of the village, known as Castlehill, and many of the streets of London, Sydney, Edinburgh and the financial district of New York City are paved with it. The harbour was built by James Bremner. Castletown's main building is the 'Drill Hall'. This is mainly used for parties, discos and small clubs such as the indoor bowls. The building that was used for these functions was the 'Traill Hall', a gift to the Village by the Traill family, owners of the flagstone quarry at Castlehill. Traill House, a large and imposing country home was the residence of the Traill family. It was located in the woods at Castlehill, in later years it was owned by the Crumb-Ewing family, it became derelict after WW2 and burned down in the late 1950s. The remains of the gatehouse can be seen on the side of the A836 at Castlehill plantation.

Industry in the village included manufacture of domestic food storage freezers, under the Norfrost brand. However, the company closed in 2013; Ebac in County Durham now produce the freezers.

== Local government ==
Castletown is in the Landward Caithness ward of the Highland Council. The ward elects four councillors by the single transferable vote system of election, which produces a form of proportional representation. It is one of seven wards within the council's Caithness, Sutherland and Easter Ross corporate management area and one of 22 wards within the council area.

== Sport ==
Castletown has a football team, Castletown FC, who wear a strip almost identical to the strip worn by Celtic FC. The pitch is regarded as the best in Caithness and Sutherland, and many Highland finals are held at the venue. Castletown play in the Caithness Division 1.

Castletown also have bowls and badminton teams who play in the local 'Drill Hall'.

== Facilities ==
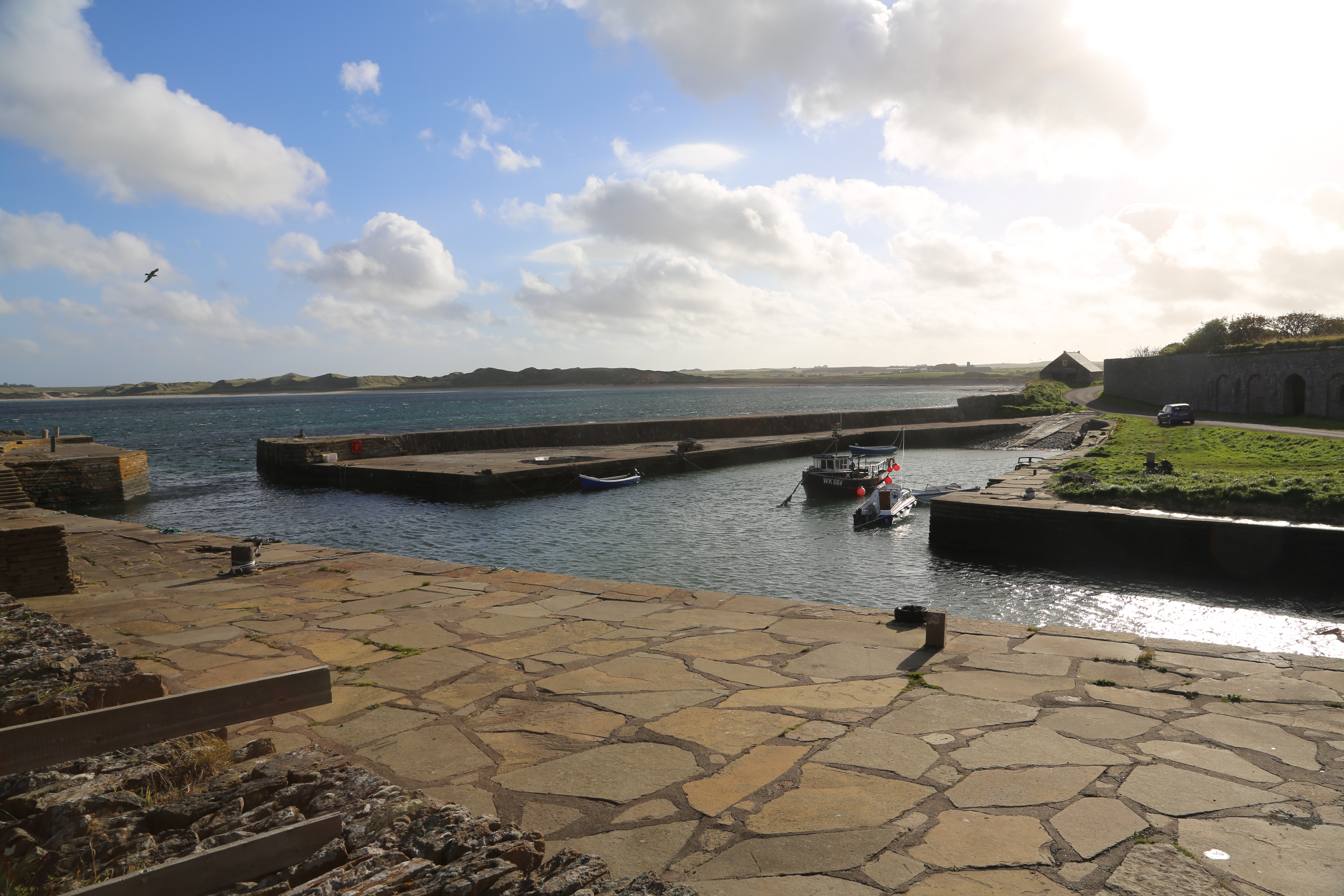
The harbour in the Castlehill area

Castletown has a small hotel (The Castletown Hotel, was The St Clair Hotel), a large bed and breakfast on a large property (Olrig House Country B&B), a large guest house (Greenland House), a licensed grocery, a butcher's, a fish and chip shop, a garden centre, a garage, hairdressers, a primary school with nursery and an after-school club, a drill hall, a youth club and an army cadets detachment hut. There are also two churches on Main Street: a Church of Scotland and Free Church of Scotland, where Reverend Howard Stone has led services for more than 25 years. Most businesses are located on the main street, the A836.
