= County Offices, Wick =

County building in Wick, Scotland

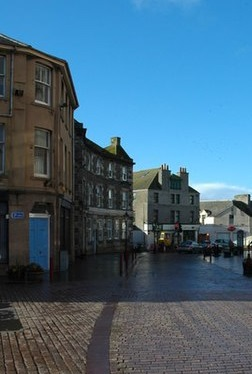
- County Offices, Wick (the building with the blue door) with Stafford Place beyond (the curved building on the left)

- Shown in Highland
- 58.4425°N 3.0915°W
- Location: High Street, Wick

History
- Built: 1820

Site notes
- Architectural style: Neo-Georgian style

Listed Building – Category C(S)
- Official name: High Street, Stafford Place, Wick Council Offices
- Designated: 16 August 2002
- Reference no.: LB48834

County Offices was a municipal structure at the corner of High Street and Market Place in Wick, Caithness, Scotland. It was built in 1894 as a post office and served as the main offices of Caithness County Council from 1930 onwards. In 1965 the council's offices were expanded to also include an adjoining older terrace called Stafford Place. The County Offices passed to the Highland Council on local government reorganisation. The building was demolished except for Stafford Place in 2013. A new building called Caithness House was built on the site to serve as an area office for the Highland Council, opening in 2015. Stafford Place is a Category B listed building.

== History ==
When Caithness was made a shire in 1641, Wick was declared to be the head burgh of the shire. However, the Sheriff of Caithness took to holding most courts and having his clerk's office in Thurso. This situation continued until 1828, when the Wick authorities took legal action against the sheriff and secured an order from the Court of Session requiring the clerk's office and regular courts to return to Wick. The county's main civic buildings were then the Town and County Hall (now known as Wick Town Hall) of 1828 and the adjoining Wick Sheriff Court of 1866, both on Bridge Street.

Wick was expanding in the 19th century, particularly following the completion of Wick Bridge across the Wick River in 1808 and the construction of a new harbour in the 1820s and early 1830s.

Many buildings in the town centre were rebuilt around this time. One of the new buildings was a curved three-storey tenement known as "Stafford Place" on the south side of the High Street, close to the corner with Market Place. It was designed in the Neo-Georgian style and built in contrasting whinstone and sandstone. On stylistic grounds the building has been dated by Historic Environment Scotland to c. 1820, but land ownership records suggest that it may not have been built until sometime between 1833 and 1835. The design involved a curved main frontage of six bays facing onto the High Street. There were originally nine openings on the ground floor with doorways in the second, third, fifth and eighth openings. The building was fenestrated with sash windows on the first and second floors, and there was a cill course separating each of the floors. Above were three shallow pyramid-shaped roofs, each with a central chimney stack.

A modern plaque on Stafford Place commemorates Alexander Bain, inventor of the electric telegraph, who served as an apprentice to a watchmaker called John Sellar there between 1829 and 1830. Wright (2009) argues that Bain probably served his apprenticeship in the previous building on the site rather than in Stafford Place itself, contrary to the wording on the plaque.

In the late 1830s and early 1840s, the left-hand section of the ground floor accommodated a grocers and drapers business, Purves & Brown. However, in the mid-19th century, the left-hand section of the ground floor was taken over by the bookseller and stationer, William Rae & Son, who also became the proprietor of a newspaper known as the Northern Ensign, first published in 1850.

In 1894 a new post office was built to the east of Stafford Place, on the corner with the Market Place. The post office moved to a new building in 1912, after which the old post office building of 1894 was occupied by Wick Parish Council, sharing the building with a club and several businesses. The 1894 building was acquired by Caithness County Council to serve as its administrative offices in 1930, becoming known as the County Offices. The County Offices did not have a council chamber, and council meetings continued to be held at the Town Hall on Bridge Street, as they had been since the creation of the county council in 1890.

In 1965 the county council acquired Stafford Place to the west of the County Offices, converting it to be additional office space. When Caithness County Council was abolished in 1975, the County Offices / Stafford Place complex passed to Caithness District Council, before passing on to the Highland Council when local government was reorganised again in 1996.

Between 2013 and 2015, the site was redeveloped to create a customer service point for the delivery of local services by the council. The works involved the complete demolition of the 1894 building, which had problems with subsidence and had been subjected to various unsympathetic repairs over the years. The redevelopment also involved the demolition of numerous outbuildings behind the original building at Stafford Place. The works were carried out by Morgan Sindall at a cost of £8.5 million.

The new office complex comprises a modern three storey building with its main public entrance and a four storey clock tower on the corner of Market Place and High Street. It has wings to the rear projecting towards Market Street and the river, and also incorporates office space within the renovated Stafford Place building. The new building was named "Caithness House" and opened in October 2015.

== See also ==
- List of listed buildings in Wick, Highland
