= Wick Town Hall =

Municipal building in Wick, Scotland

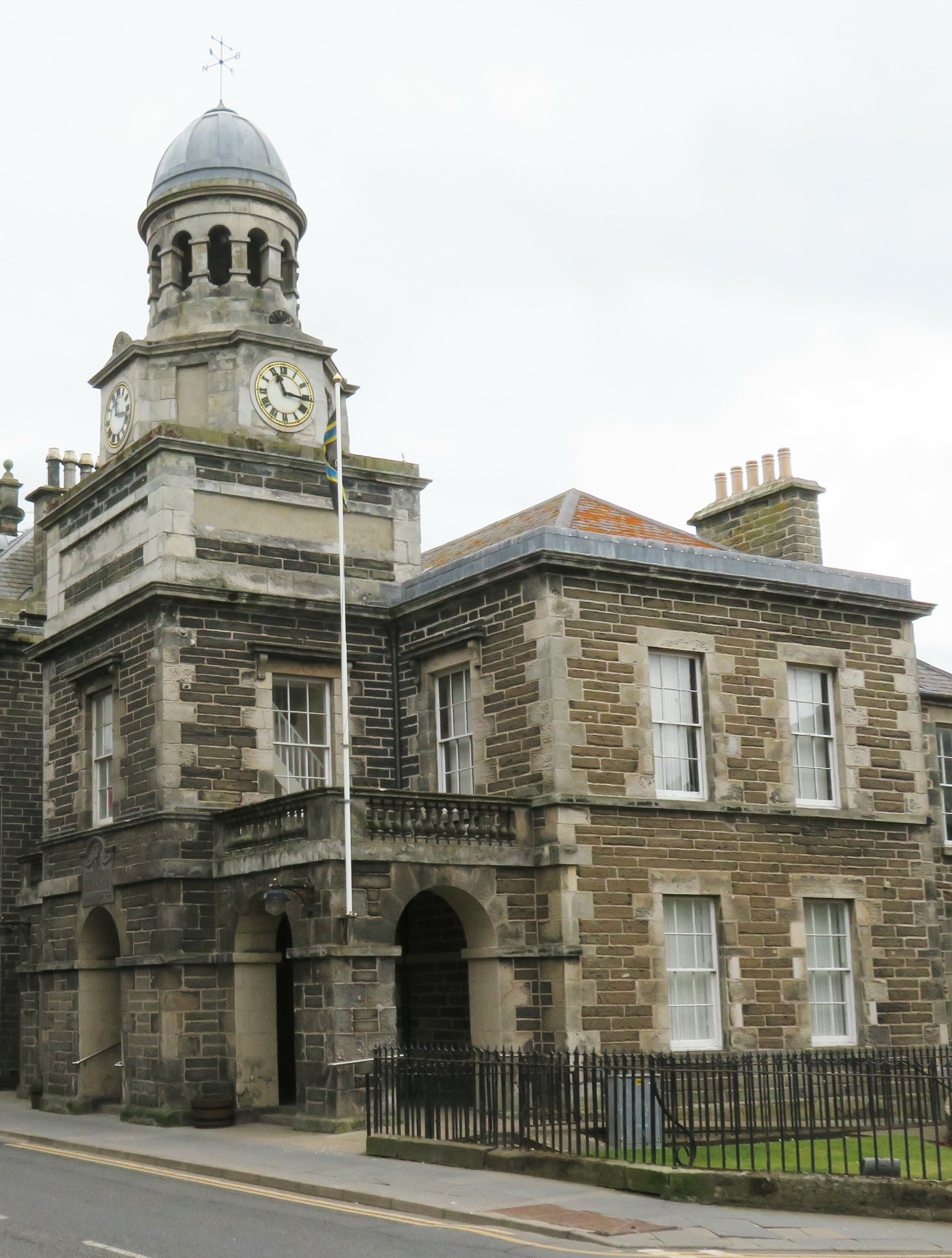
- Wick Town Hall

- Shown in Highland
- 58.4419°N 3.0930°W
- Location: Bridge Street, Wick

History
- Built: 1828

Site notes
- Architect: Robert Reid
- Architectural style: Neoclassical style

Listed Building – Category B
- Official name: Bridge Street, Town Hall
- Designated: 15 August 1979
- Reference no.: LB42299

Wick Town Hall is a municipal building in Bridge Street, Wick, in the Highland area of Scotland. The structure, which is used as a community events venue, is a Category B listed building. It formerly served as the meeting place of both Wick Town Council and Caithness County Council.

== History ==
The first municipal building in Wick was a tolbooth which was erected on the north side of the High Street in 1750. It accommodated prison cells on the ground floor and a courtroom above. By the early 19th century, the building had become dilapidated. The town council of the burgh of Wick and the Caithness Commissioners of Supply agreed to jointly fund a replacement, with the commissioners contributing £1,500 towards the estimated cost of £3,270, and the town council paying the rest. The site they selected for the new building was on the east side of Bridge Street, a short distance from the Bridge of Wick. It was designed by Robert Reid in the neoclassical style, built in coursed rubble masonry and was completed in 1828.

The design involved a symmetrical main frontage with three bays facing onto Bridge Street. The central bay, which slightly projected forward, was formed by a five-stage tower with the central opening of an arcade in the first stage, a sash window in the second stage, a blind panel in the third stage, an octagonal section with alternating clock faces and blind panels in the fourth stage and a circular cupola with a dome and a weather vane in the fifth stage. The outer bays were formed by single-storey structures, which were surmounted by balustraded parapets and which contained the outer openings of the arcade; behind the single-storey sections was the main courthouse block which was fenestrated by sash windows. Internally, the principal room was the courtroom on the first floor. The building was initially called the 'Town and County Hall', reflecting its joint ownership by the burgh and county authorities.

When Caithness had been made a shire in 1641, Wick had been declared the head burgh of the shire, but since then the Sheriff of Caithness had taken to holding most courts and having his clerk's offices in Thurso. Whilst the new town hall was under construction, Wick Town Council took legal action against the sheriff, successfully securing an order requiring the sheriff to hold regular courts and have his clerk's offices in Wick. When completed, the new building therefore served as the meeting place of both Wick Town Council and the Caithness Commissioners of Supply, and also served as the county's main courthouse. The court functions later moved to a new sheriff courthouse, which was erected on an adjacent site just to the north in 1866.

When elected county councils were created in 1890, the town hall also served as the meeting place of Caithness County Council, which held its first official meeting in the building on 22 May 1890. The county council moved its administrative offices to the County Offices on High Street in 1930, but continued to hold its meetings at the town hall.

Caithness County Council and Wick Town Council were both abolished in 1975. The successor Caithness District Council had its main offices in the old County Council's offices on High Street, but held its meetings alternating between Thurso Town Hall and Wick Town Hall, and also had some departments in the office space at Wick Town Hall. Caithness District Council was in turn abolished in 1996 when the Highland region became a single-tier council area. The Highland Council established a Caithness area committee to discuss local matters, which regularly met at the town hall until meetings transferred online in 2020 due to the COVID-19 pandemic.

The main assembly rooms within the building continue to serve as a community events venue. A major programme of refurbishment works, involving the installation of a new lift and a new heating system, was carried out in 2012. The office space within the building is now rented out by the Highland Council to commercial tenants.

Works of art in the town hall include a portrait by Henry Raeburn of the naturalist, Alexander Macleay, a portrait by Benjamin West of the statistician, Sir John Sinclair, and a portrait by Hubert von Herkomer of the local member of parliament, Sir John Pender. There is also a portrait of David Macbeth Sutherland of General Lord Horne and a portrait by unnamed artist of the naval architect, James Bremner.

== See also ==
- List of listed buildings in Wick, Highland
