= Pulteneytown Central Church =

Coordinates: 58°26′19″N 3°5′25″W

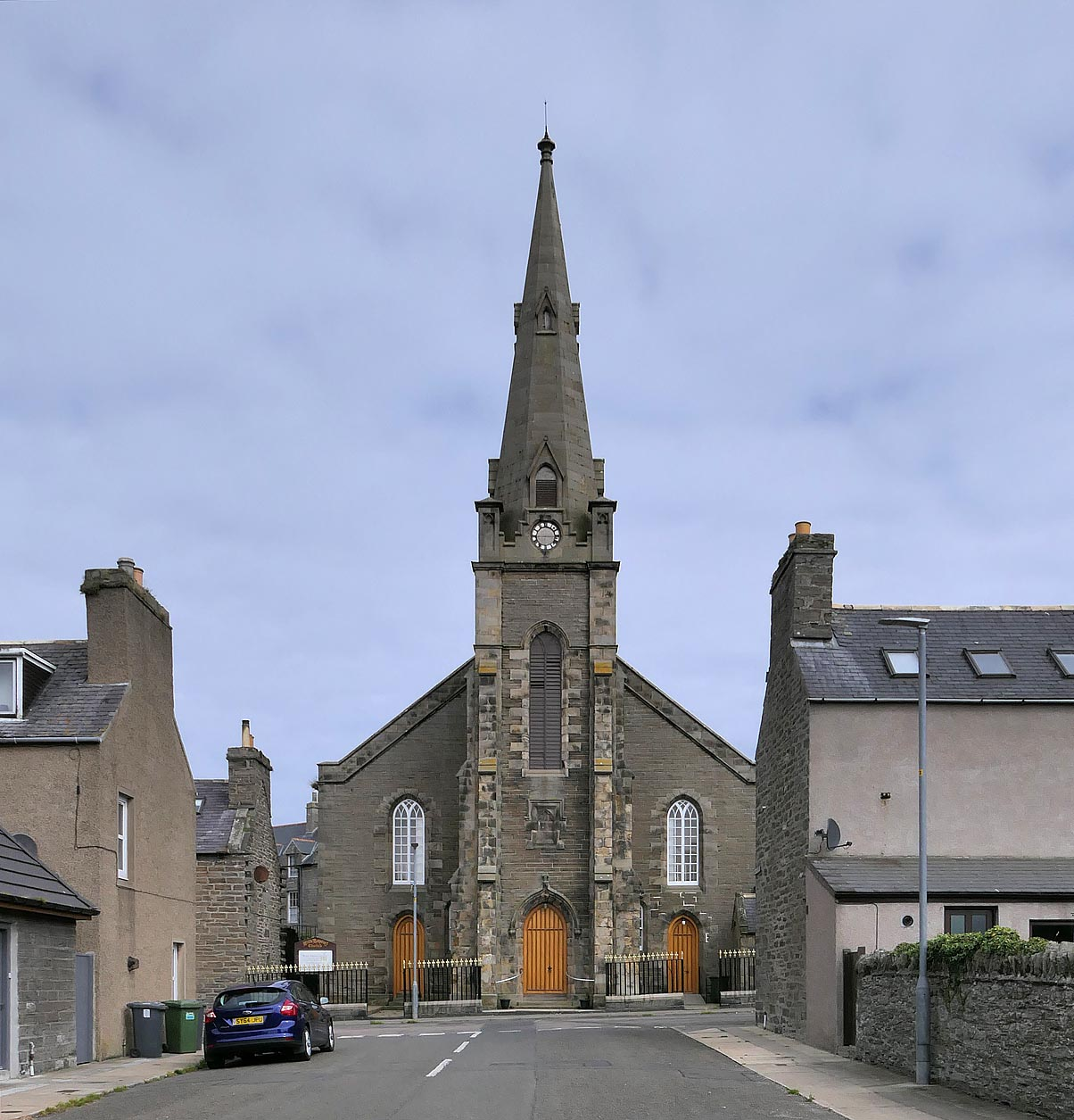
- Pulteneytown Central Church
- Location: Pulteneytown, Wick, Caithness
- Country: Scotland

Pulteneytown Central Church was a Christian church in the Pulteneytown area of Wick in Caithness in the far north of Scotland. It ran church services from 1806 to 1990. The site is now used by a Baptist church.

== History ==
After the Disruption of 1843, it was renamed Pulteneytown Free Church. It then became a United Free Church in 1900 and became a Church of Scotland from 1929 known as Wick Central Church until its closure in 1990 upon union with Pulteneytown and Thrumster Parish Church.

Wick Central Church united with the Wick West Church (now demolished) in Francis Street in 1950. In 1862 a steeple was added to the building as well as a tower which featured a bell which was said to have been loud when active. The interior woodwork and pews were dark brown. The Kirk featured a balcony and five stained glass windows. Three of the windows were donated to the Kirk in the 19th century by members of the Church; the other two to the front of the Church were inserted when the structure was completed. The manse is located at 30 Thurso Road, where the last minister Rev. Hamish Cormack stayed until the Kirk's closure.

== Closure and new use ==
In the 1980s, the congregation got smaller and fewer people were attending meetings so it came to the time for the Church to close its doors in 1990.

At this time the Wick Baptist Church which was located in Union Street was looking for new premises and they bought the site in 1997. By 1998 the congregation of the Baptist Church had moved into a newly refurbished building ready for worship. The pews were removed and replaced with modern chairs, the wooden flooring was covered with carpet, the large sanctuary was cut down in size to suit the new congregation and the balcony was replaced by a new floor suitable for storage and rooms for the large Sunday school. A new kitchen was added as well as bathrooms, an office and a side room suitable for small groups. The old Central Church at 5 Dempster Street is now a permanent meeting place for Wick Baptist Church.

== Archives ==
Documents belonging to the old church are now held at the archive at Wick airport.
