= List of listed buildings in Wick, Highland =

This is a list of listed buildings in the parish of Wick in Highland, Scotland.

== List ==
Name	Location	Date Listed	Grid Ref. (Note: Sometimes known as OSGB36, the grid reference (where provided) is based on the British national grid reference system used by the Ordnance Survey. • "Guide to National Grid". Ordnance Survey. • "Get-a-map". Ordnance Survey.)	Geo-coordinates	Notes	LB Number (Note: Historic Environment Scotland assign a unique alphanumeric identifier to each designated site in Scotland, for listed buildings this always begins with "LB", for example "LB12345".)	Image
51- 55(Inclusive Nos) And 57-59 (Inclusive Nos) Argyle Square				58°26′17″N 3°05′16″W	Category B	42280	Upload Photo
22, 23, 24, 25 Breadalbane Terrace				58°26′18″N 3°05′13″W	Category C(S)	42292	Upload Photo
Coastguard Station, Old Lookout Tower				58°25′58″N 3°04′25″W	Category B	42306	Upload Photo
3 And 5 Depmster Street				58°26′18″N 3°05′26″W	Category C(S)	42307	Upload Photo
High Street, Wick Old Parish Church				58°26′39″N 3°05′44″W	Category B	42311	Upload Photo
Malcolm Street, St Joachim's Roman Catholic Church				58°26′20″N 3°05′25″W	Category B	42316	Upload Photo
3, 4, 5, 6 Sinclair Terrace				58°26′21″N 3°05′29″W	Category C(S)	42327	Upload Photo
13 Sinclair Terrace				58°26′23″N 3°05′33″W	Category C(S)	42330	Upload Photo
20 Sinclair Terrace				58°26′24″N 3°05′38″W	Category C(S)	42333	Upload Photo
25-31 (Odd Nos) Willowbank Road				58°26′39″N 3°05′13″W	Category B	42335	Upload Photo
1 And 2 Argyle Square				58°26′15″N 3°05′13″W	Category B	42267	Upload Photo
4, 5 And 6 Argyle Square				58°26′14″N 3°05′14″W	Category B	42268	Upload Photo
11, 12, 13, 14, 15,17,18 Argyle Square				58°26′15″N 3°05′18″W	Category B	42269	Upload Photo
35-41 (Inclusive Nos) And 43, 45, 46, 48 And 49 Argyle Square				58°26′19″N 3°05′22″W	Category B	42274	Upload Photo
Whaligoe Steps And Quay				58°20′44″N 3°09′42″W	Category B	14070	Upload Photo
Keiss Baptist Church				58°32′40″N 3°05′59″W	Category C(S)	14080	Upload Photo
Keiss Village Braehead, Boatman's Cottage Braehead Cottage And Harbour Cottage				58°31′54″N 3°07′01″W	Category B	14084	Upload Photo
Sibster Farm Steading				58°27′34″N 3°09′39″W	Category A	14088	Upload Photo
Stirkoke House And Adjoining Service Range				58°26′19″N 3°10′11″W	Category B	14089	Upload Photo
Thrumster House				58°23′27″N 3°08′43″W	Category B	14064	Upload Photo
Harbour Quay, Storehouse Including Curing Yard Wall To Rear (Steven And Co)				58°26′26″N 3°05′13″W	Category C(S)	48404	Upload Photo
16, 17, 18, 19 Smith Terrace				58°26′15″N 3°05′03″W	Category C(S)	48409	Upload Photo
Moray Street, St John The Evangelist Episcopal Church With Boundary Walls And Railings				58°26′18″N 3°05′37″W	Category B	44723	Upload Photo
Ulbster, Byre At Ivy Cottage				58°20′28″N 3°10′14″W	Category B	44582	Upload Photo
8 And 9 Breadalbane Crescent Including Boundary Wall, Railings And Stables				58°26′19″N 3°05′11″W	Category B	42289	Upload Photo
10, 11, 12 13 Breadalbane Crescent Including Boundary Wall And Railings				58°26′19″N 3°05′13″W	Category B	42290	Upload Photo
14, 15, 16, 17, 18 Breadalbane Crescent				58°26′19″N 3°05′14″W	Category B	42291	Upload Photo
28 And 29 Breadalbane Terrace				58°26′19″N 3°05′15″W	Category C(S)	42295	Upload Photo
48 And 49 Breadalbane Terrace				58°26′21″N 3°05′23″W	Category B	42296	Upload Photo
High Street, Woolworths				58°26′34″N 3°05′29″W	Category B	42313	Upload Photo
6 And 7 Rose Street				58°26′24″N 3°05′15″W	Category C(S)	42322	Upload Photo
2 Williamson Street				58°26′24″N 3°05′17″W	Category C(S)	42334	Upload Photo
20 And 22 Argyle Square				58°26′15″N 3°05′20″W	Category B	42270	Upload Photo
Keiss Castle, Walled Garden Gate Lodge And Gatepiers				58°32′21″N 3°06′30″W	Category B	18445	Upload Photo
Ackergill Tower, Garden Walls, Walled Gardens And Stable Range				58°28′32″N 3°06′41″W	Category A	14072	Upload another image See more images
5 And 6 Breadalbane Terrace				58°26′17″N 3°05′08″W	Category C(S)	48392	Upload Photo
46 Breadalbane Terrace				58°26′21″N 3°05′22″W	Category C(S)	48401	Upload Photo
Telford Street, (Storehouse)				58°26′26″N 3°05′20″W	Category C(S)	48410	Upload Photo
62 And 63 Argyle Square				58°26′16″N 3°05′12″W	Category B	42283	Upload Photo
65 Argyle Square And 1 Grant Street				58°26′16″N 3°05′12″W	Category B	42284	Upload Photo
4 And 6 Breadalbane Crescent Including Boundary Wall, Railings And Stables				58°26′19″N 3°05′10″W	Category B	42288	Upload Photo
Bridge Street, Town Hall				58°26′31″N 3°05′35″W	Category B	42299	Upload another image
Bridge Street. Bridge Street Parish Church				58°26′32″N 3°05′36″W	Category B	42301	Upload Photo
Bridge Street, Bank Of Scotland				58°26′32″N 3°05′35″W	Category B	42303	Upload Photo
26 Broadhaven (W Mcdonald)				58°26′47″N 3°03′48″W	Category B	42304	Upload Photo
Harbour Place, The Round House				58°26′22″N 3°05′10″W	Category B	42310	Upload Photo
High Street, Graveyard With Remains Of Old St Fergus Church And Enclosing Walls				58°26′38″N 3°05′41″W	Category B	42312	Upload Photo
30, 31, 33 Argyle Square				58°26′18″N 3°05′25″W	Category B	42272	Upload Photo
Wester Bridge Of Wester Over Wester River				58°30′40″N 3°08′59″W	Category B	14068	Upload Photo
Ackergill Tower Dovecotes				58°28′28″N 3°06′40″W	Category B	14073	Upload Photo
Hempriggs House And Stable / Carriage House				58°24′31″N 3°06′21″W	Category B	14079	Upload Photo
Keiss Village Scaraben				58°32′03″N 3°07′25″W	Category B	14083	Upload Photo
Noss Head Lighthouse Keepers' Houses And Offices				58°28′44″N 3°03′04″W	Category A	14087	Upload Photo
31 Breadalbane Terrace				58°26′19″N 3°05′16″W	Category C(S)	48396	Upload Photo
11 Malcolm Street				58°26′19″N 3°05′27″W	Category C(S)	48406	Upload Photo
1 Breadalbane Crescent Including Rear Garden Wall				58°26′18″N 3°05′08″W	Category B	42287	Upload Photo
26 And 27 Breadalbane Terrace				58°26′19″N 3°05′15″W	Category C(S)	42294	Upload Photo
Bridge Street, Royal Bank Of Scotland				58°26′30″N 3°05′36″W	Category B	42298	Upload Photo
Bridge Street, Clydesdale Bank				58°26′33″N 3°05′33″W	Category B	42302	Upload Photo
7 Church Street. Kirkhill				58°26′39″N 3°05′39″W	Category C(S)	42305	Upload Photo
Dempster Street, Wick Central Church (Church Of Scotland)				58°26′16″N 3°05′25″W	Category B	42308	Upload Photo
Hillhead Farm East And West Kilns And Abutting Ranges Of Farm Buildings				58°26′49″N 3°04′27″W	Category B	42315	Upload Photo
Market Place, High Street Post Office				58°26′32″N 3°05′27″W	Category B	42320	Upload Photo
7, 8, 9, 10 Sinclair Terrace				58°26′22″N 3°05′31″W	Category C(S)	42328	Upload Photo
18 Sinclair Terrace				58°26′24″N 3°05′37″W	Category B	42332	Upload Photo
Ulbster, Ivy Cottage And Garden Walls				58°20′28″N 3°10′14″W	Category C(S)	19479	Upload Photo
Ulbster Mr James Sinclair's House And Steading				58°21′16″N 3°09′30″W	Category C(S)	14067	Upload Photo
Whaligoe Former Curing Yard And Dwelling				58°20′46″N 3°09′46″W	Category B	14069	Upload Photo
Keiss Village Church Of Scotland				58°31′58″N 3°07′15″W	Category B	14082	Upload another image
Ulbster Sinclair Mausoleum And St Martin's Burial Ground With Gate Piers				58°21′36″N 3°08′13″W	Category B	14066	Upload Photo
42 Breadalbane Terrace				58°26′20″N 3°05′21″W	Category C(S)	48400	Upload Photo
15 And 16 Sinclair Terrace				58°26′23″N 3°05′35″W	Category B	48408	Upload Photo
Staxigoe Grain Store				58°27′21″N 3°03′22″W	Category B	49297	Upload Photo
Harbour Quay, Old Fish Market				58°26′18″N 3°05′05″W	Category C(S)	44955	Upload Photo
High Street, Wick Old Parish Church Churchyard, Dunbar Memorial				58°26′38″N 3°05′41″W	Category A	44956	Upload Photo
Bridge Street, Bridge Over Wick River				58°26′30″N 3°05′38″W	Category B	42297	Upload Photo
8 And 10 Dempster Street				58°26′19″N 3°05′26″W	Category C(S)	42319	Upload Photo
Shore Lane, Mount Hooley And Gatepiers				58°26′36″N 3°05′20″W	Category B	42323	Upload Photo
1 And 2 Sinclair Terrace				58°26′21″N 3°05′28″W	Category C(S)	42326	Upload Photo
Ackergill Shore, Former Life Boat House				58°28′26″N 3°06′04″W	Category B	14075	Upload Photo
Haster, Bridge Of Haster Over Achairn Burn				58°26′38″N 3°09′13″W	Category B	14077	Upload Photo
Keiss Harbour And Warehouse				58°31′54″N 3°06′58″W	Category A	14085	Upload Photo
1, 2 And 3 Breadalbane Terrace				58°26′16″N 3°05′08″W	Category C(S)	48391	Upload Photo
12 And 13 Breadalbane Terrace				58°26′17″N 3°05′09″W	Category C(S)	48393	Upload Photo
17, 18, 19 Breadalbane Terrace				58°26′18″N 3°05′11″W	Category C(S)	48395	Upload Photo
41 Breadalbane Terrace				58°26′20″N 3°05′20″W	Category C(S)	48399	Upload Photo
18 Bank Row				58°26′23″N 3°05′18″W	Category C(S)	42285	Upload Photo
Bridge Street, Sheriff Court				58°26′31″N 3°05′34″W	Category B	42300	Upload another image
7 And 9 Malcolm Street				58°26′20″N 3°05′26″W	Category C(S)	42318	Upload Photo
Wick Railway Station				58°26′30″N 3°05′48″W	Category B	42321	Upload Photo
Sinclair Terrace, Wick Martyrs' Free Church				58°26′20″N 3°05′27″W	Category B	42325	Upload Photo
Whaligoe Mill				58°20′51″N 3°09′40″W	Category B	14071	Upload Photo
Keiss Baptist Manse				58°32′40″N 3°06′01″W	Category C(S)	14081	Upload Photo
Tannach Mains				58°24′29″N 3°09′29″W	Category B	14090	Upload Photo
Bank Row, The Black Stairs				58°26′22″N 3°05′14″W	Category C(S)	48390	Upload Photo
15 Breadalbane Terrace				58°26′18″N 3°05′11″W	Category C(S)	48394	Upload Photo
42 Union Street, (North Of Scotland Newspapers)				58°26′26″N 3°05′39″W	Category B	48411	Upload Photo
Wick Harbour, South Pier Lighthouse And North Pier Lighthouse				58°26′22″N 3°04′54″W	Category B	42309	Upload Photo
17 Sinclair Terrace				58°26′23″N 3°05′36″W	Category B	42331	Upload Photo
Rutherford, Undertaker Off Argyle Square				58°26′15″N 3°05′21″W	Category C(S)	42271	Upload Photo
Bilbster House				58°27′45″N 3°13′57″W	Category C(S)	14076	Upload Photo
Keiss Harbour Ice-House				58°31′55″N 3°06′54″W	Category C(S)	14086	Upload Photo
37 And 38 Breadalbane Terrace				58°26′20″N 3°05′19″W	Category C(S)	48398	Upload Photo
47 Breadalbane Terrace				58°26′21″N 3°05′22″W	Category C(S)	48403	Upload Photo
Keiss Harbour Bothy				58°31′55″N 3°07′00″W	Category B	43519	Upload Photo
19 - 27 (Odd) Bank Row (Wick Heritage Centre)				58°26′23″N 3°05′20″W	Category A	42286	Upload another image
High Street, D R Simpson, Ironmonger				58°26′34″N 3°05′27″W	Category C(S)	42314	Upload Photo
Malcolm Street, Roman Catholic Convent				58°26′20″N 3°05′25″W	Category C(S)	42317	Upload Photo
Sinclair Terrace, Carnegie Public Library				58°26′25″N 3°05′38″W	Category B	42324	Upload Photo
Ackergill Mains				58°28′11″N 3°06′41″W	Category B	14074	Upload Photo
Hempriggs, Cottage Opposite Main Entrance Drive, Facing A9 Road				58°24′27″N 3°06′49″W	Category C(S)	14078	Upload Photo
Ulbster Mains Of Ulbster				58°21′42″N 3°08′14″W	Category C(S)	14065	Upload Photo
32 Breadalbane Terrace				58°26′19″N 3°05′17″W	Category C(S)	48397	Upload Photo
High Street, Stafford Place, Wick Council Offices				58°26′33″N 3°05′29″W	Category C(S)	48834	Upload another image
Argyle Square, Pulteneytown Parish Church				58°26′15″N 3°05′22″W	Category C(S)	49693	Upload Photo
Thrumster, South Yarrows Croft House, Byres And Boundary Walls				58°22′22″N 3°11′12″W	Category C(S)	50835	Upload Photo

== Key ==
The scheme for classifying buildings in Scotland is:

- Category A: "buildings of national or international importance, either architectural or historic; or fine, little-altered examples of some particular period, style or building type."
- Category B: "buildings of regional or more than local importance; or major examples of some particular period, style or building type, which may have been altered."
- Category C: "buildings of local importance; lesser examples of any period, style, or building type, as originally constructed or moderately altered; and simple traditional buildings which group well with other listed buildings."

In March 2016 there were 47,288 listed buildings in Scotland. Of these, 8% were Category A, and 50% were Category B, with the remaining 42% being Category C.

== See also ==
- List of listed buildings in Highland
