= Wick Baptist Church =

Coordinates: 58.4385°N 3.0903°W

The Baptist Church for Wick was founded in 1806 in Wick, Caithness, Scotland.

At first the Baptist congregation met in a small loft in Kirk Lane, then later they moved to a room above Bows Baker Shop. A church was then built on the High Street; this building no longer exists as it didn't survive the great 1970's redevelopment of the town. After the Baptist Congregation moved into a newly built Church in Union Street in 1865, the building on the High Street was used as a Mission Hall.

In the 1980s the Pulteneytown Central Church in Dempster Street closed and in 1998 the Wick Baptist Church moved into the Central Church premises after it had been completely refurbished and greatly modernised; this was when the Baptist Church was under the ministry of the Rev. Angus Morrison.

The Church holds two services each Sunday, as well as youth clubs, parent and toddler groups, and a midweek meeting for prayer and Bible study.

== Sources ==
- Rev. John Horne (1894). History of The Wick Baptist Church. Wick: W. Rae.
- Wick Baptist Church Anniversary Booklet
- A History of Wick and Keiss Baptist Church by Jayden Alexander (2019)
