= Caithness Blitz =

World War II air raids on Scotland

- Part of the Strategic bombing campaign during World War II
Date	1 July – October 1940
Location	Wick, Scotland

Belligerents
Nazi Germany	United Kingdom; ∟ Scotland

Commanders and leaders
(Nazi Germany) Adolf Hitler; (Nazi Germany) Hermann Göring	(United Kingdom) Winston Churchill

Strength
Unknown, at least 1 Junkers Ju 88 and 3 Heinkel He 111s	Unknown

Casualties and losses
Unknown, likely none	18 killed, unknown wounded

The Caithness Blitz refers to bombing raids on the town of Wick and the surrounding area by the Nazi German Luftwaffe. The first was on 1 July 1940 and, alongside the raid in Kingston upon Hull, Yorkshire, was among the first daylight raids to hit British towns in World War Two. Over the course of the war, there were no less than six raids on the town, with 222 high explosives dropped on it and the surrounding area.

== Prelude ==
During the First World War, Wick was a vital link in the supply chain as coal, men and materiel were transported from all corners of the United Kingdom via Inverness and the Far North Line, for onward transportation by sea from Wick Harbour to the Royal Navy's Home Fleet base at Scapa Flow in the Orkney Islands, a mere 44 miles away as the crow flies. Understandably, after Britain declared war on Germany in September 1939, Scapa Flow was brought back into service and the operation was started back up again. However, due to major advances in aircraft technology, Wick Harbour was far more vulnerable to attack than it was in the previous conflict where the only long range bombers to hand were Zeppelin airships, and with Nazi Germany invading both the Netherlands and Norway, it made the north of Scotland a far easier target.

== The first daylight raid on British towns ==
The first air raid came a whole two months before the start of the mass bombing of cities known in Britain as The Blitz campaign. Due to the war, the school summer holidays had been extended between 18 June until 1 October.

Around 4:30 pm on 1 July 1940, a lone Junkers Ju 88 flew into Wick, undetected in thick cloud cover, meeting no resistance from anti-aircraft fire or scrambled aircraft from RAF Wick. Due to this, no air raid sirens were sounded, and the aircraft caught the people of Wick off guard.

Aiming for the strategically important harbour, the Junkers dropped two 50 kg bombs, before making a hasty banking manoeuvre to retreat. Unfortunately, the bomber released its load too early, sending both bombs straight into the houses of Bank Row, killing 11 people, 8 of which were children, a further four would die of their injuries. The youngest victim was John Wares, aged 4.

It has been recorded that weeks prior to the raid, munition ships were recorded to have docked in the harbour, had there been a ship docked, and bombs hit their intended target, the casualty rates would've been far higher, and much of the town obliterated.

== October raid ==
On the evening of 26 October, three Heinkel He 111s set out to bomb RAF Sarclet, a decoy airfield near Thurmster, which had tricked German air crews multiple times already, diverting attention away from the main base at RAF Wick. However, as the Heinkels were preparing their bombing run, the air crews spotted the hangars at RAF Wick on the horizon, hastily changing direction and aiming for the air base at Wick. Again, like the previous raid, the town was caught by surprise, as the Heinkels strafed the streets with their machine guns before releasing their bombs, with seven falling short, and one scoring a direct hit on a bungalow on Hill Avenue, killing 3 of the 5 occupants, detonating as they moved to exit the house after it impacted without going off. This would be the last raid on the town that resulted in civilian casualties, with a further four raids on the town causing no fatalities.

== Memorials ==
In August 2010, a memorial garden was opened to commemorate those killed in the raids.
