= North of Scotland Newspapers =

North of Scotland Newspapers (NOSN) is the trade name under which Scottish Provincial Press publishes two weekly newspapers, the John O'Groat Journal and the Caithness Courier, both serving the Caithness area in the Highland council area of Scotland. The two papers share one website.

The Groat is normally published on Fridays, and the Courier on Wednesdays.

The NOSN trade name has been in use since 1983, but the newspaper titles have histories stretching back into the 19th century. The Groat began as a Wick-centred paper, and the Courier as a Thurso-centred paper. Wick and Thurso were the only burghs in the former county of Caithness.

The Groat has a circulation of around 7,200, and the Courier around 5,700.

== See also ==
- Newspapers of Scotland
