= James Bremner =

Scottish naval architect (1784–1856)

James Bremner (25 September 1784 – 20 August 1856), a notable Scottish naval architect, harbour builder and ship-raiser.

== Life and work ==
James, the youngest of the nine children of Janet and James Bremner, was born in Stain, near Keiss, in the parish of Wick, Caithness, in Scotland.

His only education was the Bible. At the age of 16, he was apprenticed for six years to the shipbuilders "Robert Steele & Sons" of Greenock. After he had completed his apprenticeship he returned to Wick and started his own shipbuilding yard in Pulteneytown, near Wick Harbour, where he built 56 or more vessels, ranging in size from 45 tons to 600 tons. At this time, he also became well known throughout the United Kingdom for his skills in rescuing sunken and stranded vessels. When there was an insurrection in Wick he treated the injuries of combatants from both sides and was tried for Sedition as a consequence. His peers found him Not Guilty and he was carried from the court on the shoulders of the cheering local populace.

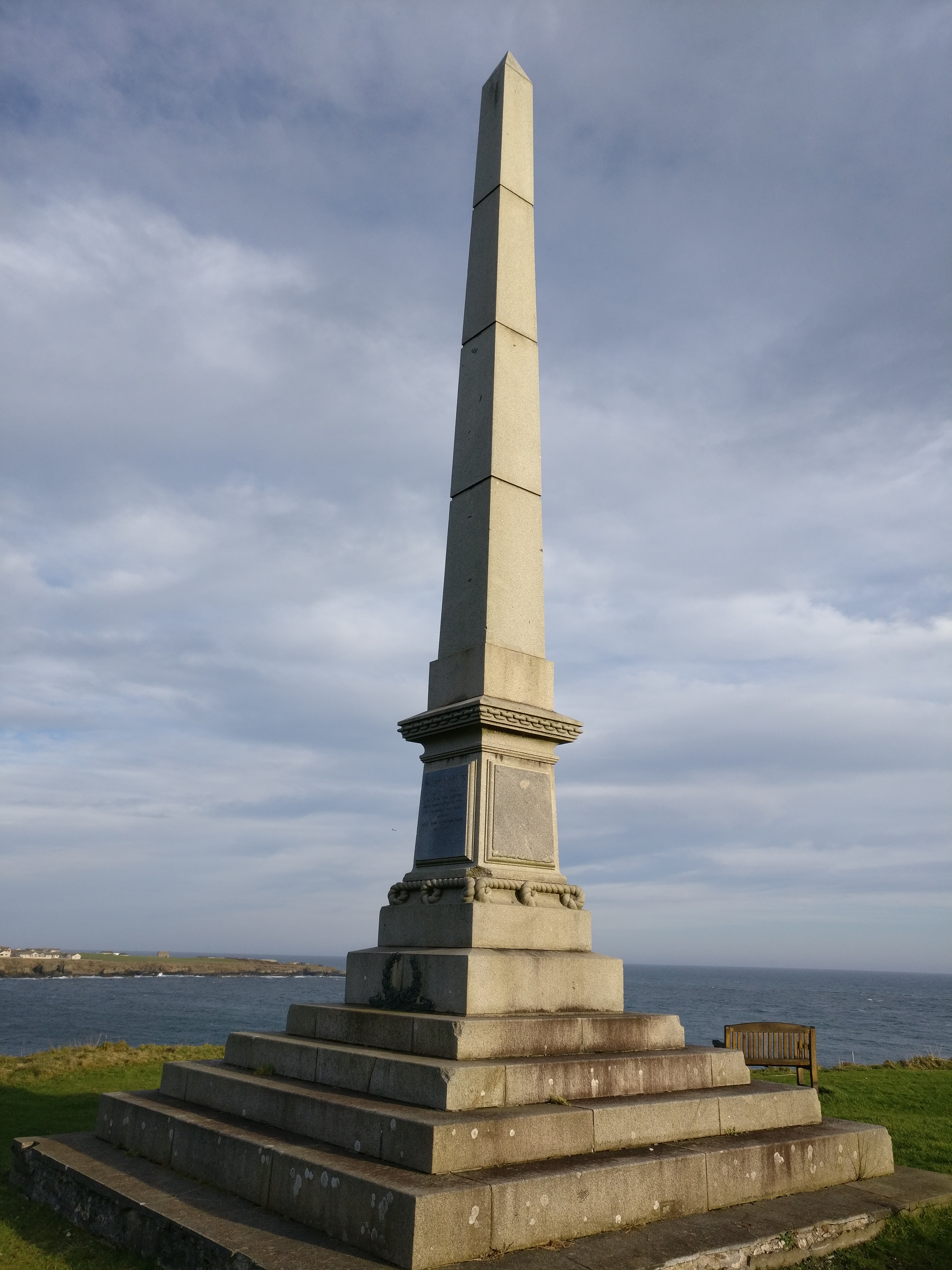
A monument to James Bremner, Naval Architect, overlooking Wick Bay and harbour.

When, in 1846, Brunel's SS Great Britain went aground on the sands of Dundrum Bay, Ireland, it is to his son, Alexander Bremner, that Brunel turned for help after various leading salvage experts had either declared the salvage impossible or failed in an attempt. Alexander called in his father to develop a successful methodology. The method used by Bremner was later used to refloat her off a beach in South Georgia over a century later, after which she was brought back to her final resting place as a tourist attraction in Bristol. He frequently corresponded with Thomas Telford and was employed by Brunel as an engineering consultant when he built the Thames Tunnel under the Thames.

His career involved the rescue of perhaps 236 or more stricken vessels. As well as building and rescuing ships, he worked on 19 harbour structures in Scotland, not least an extension to Telford's harbour in Wick Bay. He had watched Winter gales destroy harbour walls by lifting and working loose the horizontally laid stones. When he rebuilt the walls he simply relaid them on their ends to eliminate this structural weakness.

Bremner became a member of the Institution of Civil Engineers in 1833, and he was awarded the Telford Medal for several of his papers on engineering.

Bremner married early in his life and had numerous sons and daughters. The sons were all brought up as engineers; one of them, David Bremner, engineer for the Clyde trustees, died in 1852. James's wife died in 1856 and Bremner himself died in the August of the same year. In 1903 a tall obelisk was erected to his memory on high ground overlooking Wick Harbour, where it stands to this day.
