= Wick Sheriff Court =

Judicial building in Wick, Scotland

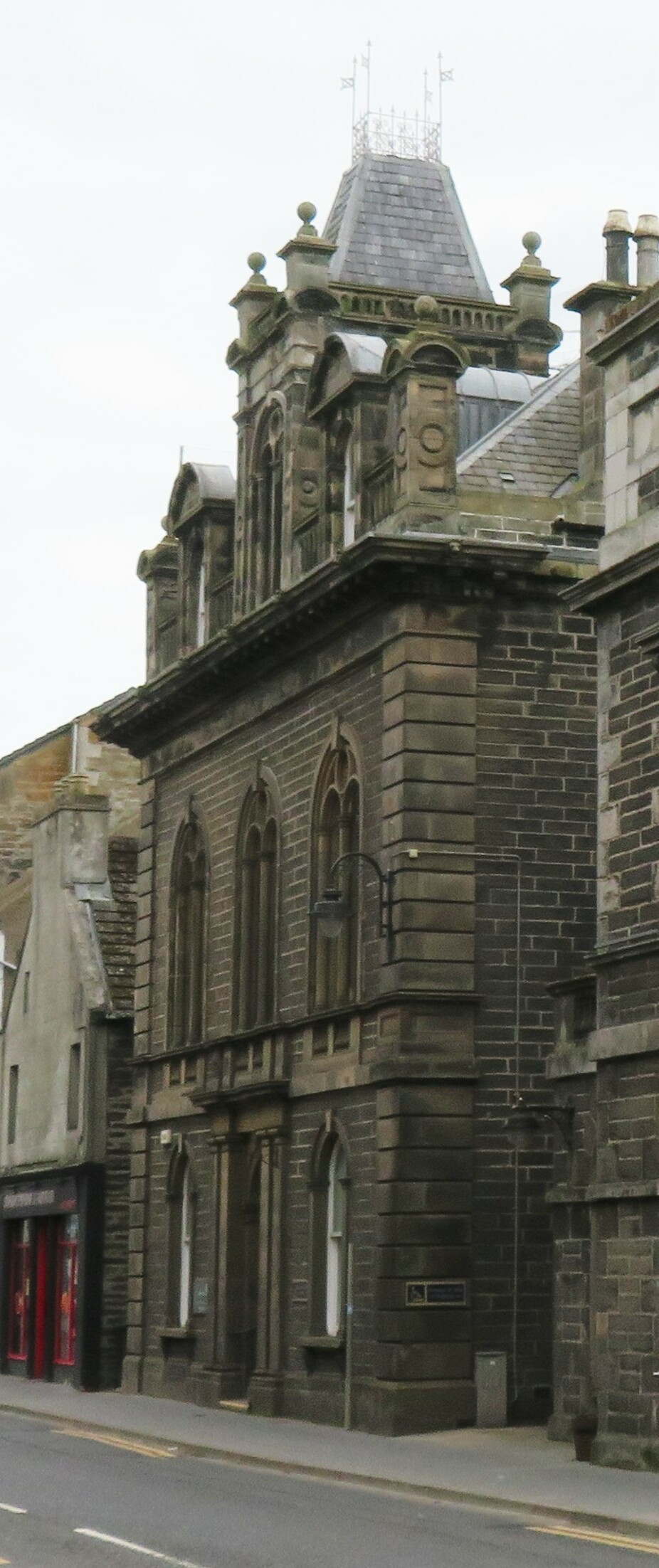
- Wick Sheriff Court

- Shown in Highland
- 58.4420°N 3.0928°W
- Location: Bridge Street, Wick

History
- Built: 1866

Site notes
- Architect: David Rhind
- Architectural style: Renaissance Revival style

Listed Building – Category B
- Official name: Wick Sheriff Court, excluding flat-roofed extension to southeast, Bridge Street, Wick
- Designated: 14 September 1983
- Reference no.: LB42300

Wick Sheriff Court is a judicial structure in Bridge Street, Wick, Caithness, Scotland. The structure, which remains in use as a courthouse, is a Category B listed building.

== History ==
When Caithness had been made a shire in 1641, Wick had been declared the head burgh of the shire, but after that the Sheriff of Caithness had taken to holding most courts and having his clerk's offices in Thurso. Following a decree of the Court of Session, hearings were transferred from Thurso to Wick in 1828. Hearings were subsequently held in a courtroom in the newly completed Wick Town Hall.

In the 1860s, the Commissioners of Supply decided that Wick needed a dedicated courthouse: the site they selected was just to the north of the town hall. The new building was designed by David Rhind in the Renaissance Revival style, built in ashlar stone and was officially opened on 16 May 1866.

The design involved a symmetrical main frontage of three bays facing onto Bridge Street. The central bay featured a round headed doorway with a keystone and an architrave flanked by pairs of Doric order pilasters supporting an entablature and a cornice. The outer bays on the ground floor were fenestrated by round headed sash windows with keystones and architraves while all three bays on the first floor were fenestrated by bi-partite round headed windows with balustrades, colonnettes and rosettes in the spandrels. At attic level, there was a central tower with a window and a mansard roof flanked by aediculae and, beyond that, by piers surmounted by ball finials. Internally, the principal room was the main courtroom on the first floor.

The building continues to serve a judicial function, being used for hearings of the sheriff's court and, on one day a month, for hearings of the justice of the peace court.

== See also ==
- List of listed buildings in Wick, Highland
