= Wick, Caithness =

Town in Highland, Scotland

Wick: Scottish Gaelic: Inbhir Ùige; Scots: Week
- Town
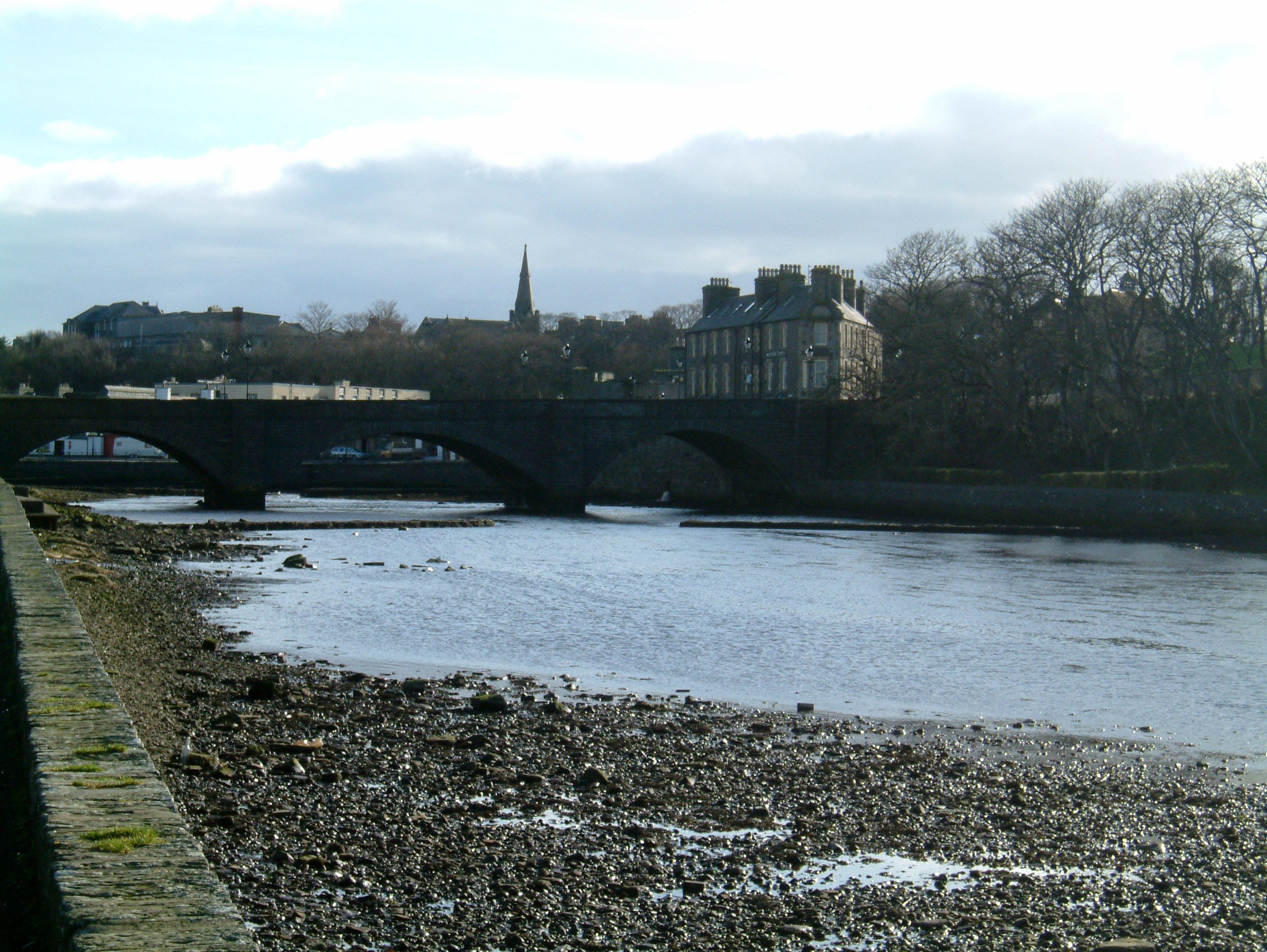
- Looking down-river towards the Bridge of Wick

- Location within the Highland council area
- Area: 3.48 km^{2} (1.34 sq mi)
- Population: 6,913 (2022)
  - Density: 1,986/km^{2} (5,140/sq mi)
- OS grid reference: ND365505
  - Edinburgh: 172 mi (277 km)
  - London: 493 mi (793 km)
- Council area: Highland
- Lieutenancy area: Caithness
- Country: Scotland
- Sovereign state: United Kingdom
- Post town: WICK
- Postcode district: KW1
- Dialling code: 01955
- Police: Scotland
- Fire: Scottish
- Ambulance: Scottish
- UK Parliament: Caithness, Sutherland and Easter Ross
- Scottish Parliament: Caithness, Sutherland and Ross

Wick (Scottish Gaelic: Inbhir Ùige [ˈinivɪɾʲˈuːkʲə]; Scots: Week) is a town and royal burgh in Caithness, in the far north of Scotland. The town straddles the River Wick and extends along both sides of Wick Bay. "Wick Locality" had a population of 6,913 at the time of the 2022 census, a decrease from 2011.

Pulteneytown, which was developed on the south side of the river by the British Fisheries Society during the 19th century, was officially merged into the burgh in 1902.

Elzy was described as on the coast a couple of miles east of Wick in 1836.

The town is on the main road (the A99–A9 road) linking John o' Groats with southern Britain. The Far North railway line links Wick railway station with southern Scotland and with Thurso, the other burgh of Caithness. Wick Airport is on Wick's northern outskirts and serves as a base for private helicopter flights to offshore wind and oil projects, as well as scheduled commercial flights to Aberdeen and Glasgow.

The main offices of The John O'Groat Journal and The Caithness Courier are located in Wick, as are Caithness General Hospital (run by NHS Highland), the Wick Carnegie Library and local offices of the Highland Council. Wick Sheriff Court is one of 16 sheriff courts serving the sheriffdom of Grampian, Highland and Islands.

== History ==
=== Pre-Christian Wick ===
Iron Age activity in the parish of Wick is evident in the hill fort at Garrywhin. Evidence of activity around Wick from the Norse pagan period was discovered in 1837 when brooches and bracelets from the Norse were uncovered by archaeologists. The name Wick appears to be from a Norse word, vík, meaning bay, cf. also the word viking.

=== Conversion to Christianity ===
In the eighth century, Saint Fergus, an Irish missionary, lived in Wick or its immediate vicinity during his mission to the people in the area. He is the patron saint of Wick. One of the fairs in Wick, the Fergusmas, is named after this saint. The old church of Wick, which stood at the east end of the town at a place called Mount Holie, was dedicated to him. It is believed that the Chapel of St. Tear in Wick Parish near Ackergill was founded in the eighth century by St Drostan, whose ministry was in Aberdeenshire.

=== 11th century ===
St. Duthac (1000–1065) was a native Scot who lived in or around Dornoch. He had a chapel in Wick.

=== 12th and 13th centuries ===
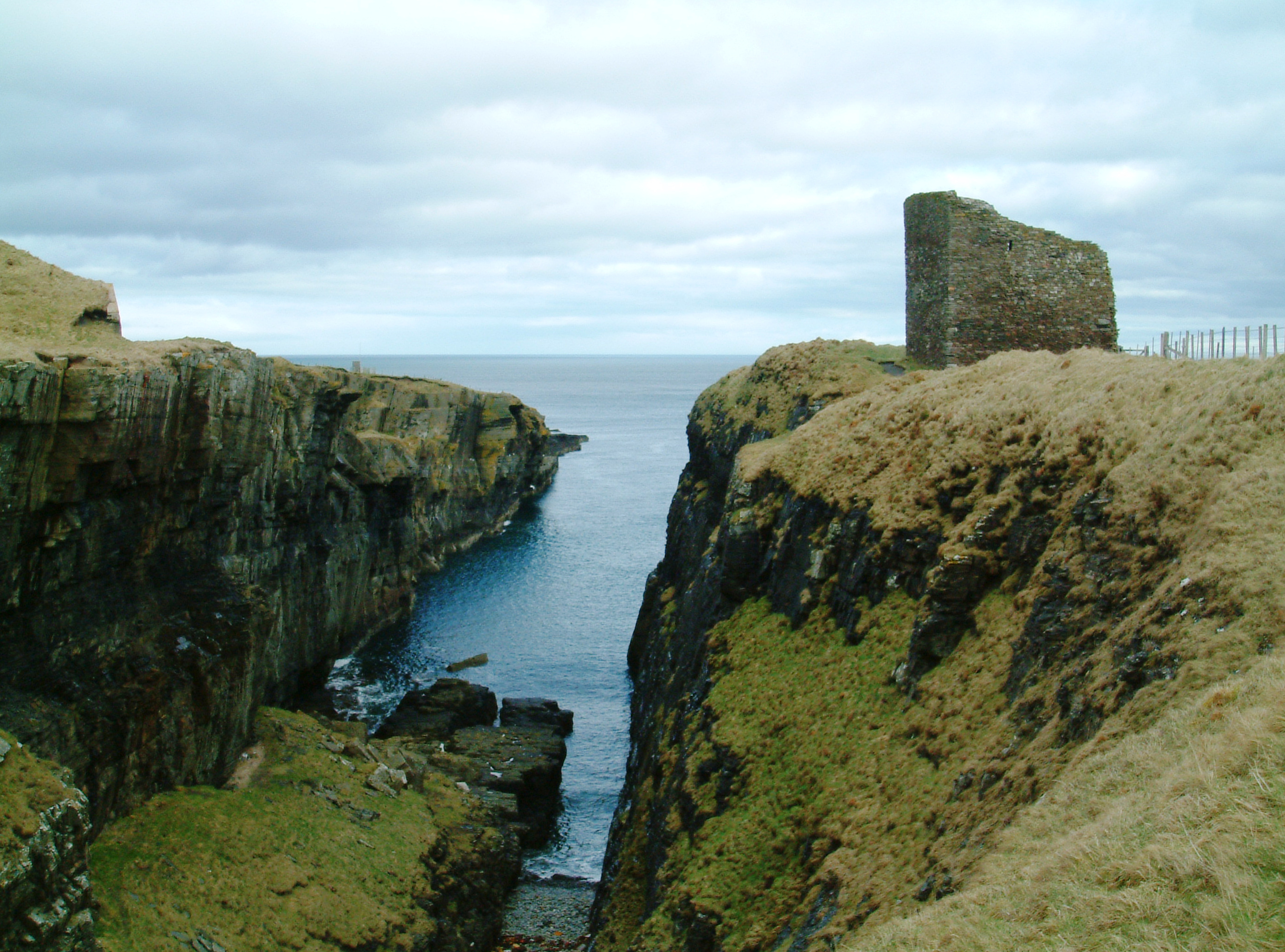
Castle of Old Wick

Wick belonged to Norway, as did all of Caithness, until the reign of William the Lion (1165–1214), at which time the Norwegian earls held of the king of Scotland.

The Castle of Old Wick, commonly known as "The Old Man of Wick" (or "Aul man o' Wick") is thought to have been built in about 1160 by Harald Maddadson, Earl of Caithness and Orkney. Earl Harald, who was half Norse, is thought to have resided there. It was long used by fishermen as an aid to navigation in the North Sea.

The Origines Parochiales Scotiae records these events for twelfth-century Wick:

Between the years 1142 and 1149 Rognvald Earl of Orkney went into Katanes and was there entertained at Vik by a husbandman named Sveinn the son of Hroald, a very brave man. When Sveinn Asleifson was in the Hebrides, he committed the keeping of Dungulsbae, which he had received from Earl Rognvald, to Margad Grimson, whose oppressions caused many to take refuge with Hroald in Wik. This occasioned a dispute between Hroald and Margad, and the latter soon afterwards went to Wik with nineteen men and slew Hroald. Between the years 1153 and 1156, Harald Maddadson, then joint Earl Katanes and Orkney with Earl Rognvald, passed into Katanes and wintered at Wik.

=== 14th and 15th centuries ===
In about 1330, the parish of Wick was included among the Caithness lands owned by the family of Cheyne. The last male heir, Sir Reginald de Cheyne, died c. 1345 and was succeeded by his two daughters, who, by marriage, carried the lands into the clans Sinclair, Sutherland, and Keith.

Between 1390 and 1406, King Robert III granted the town of Wick in heritage to Neill Sutherland with a burgh of barony.

In 1438, the clans Gunn and Keith joined battle near Wick on the moor of Tannach with both sides suffering heavy losses. However, hostilities between the two clans were not ended at that time.

=== 16th century ===
In 1503, the Parliament of Scotland established a sheriff for Caithness, who "should sit and have a place for administration of his office within the town of Wick".

The oldest extant charter in Wick was that by Andrew Stewart, Bishop of Caithness, to Alexander Brysbene signed on 14 February 1503. The charter was for a tenement in Wick for the annual payment of "two shillings of the usual money of Scotland" and attendance at "three suits and our three head courts" at Wick "with all arms."

In 1538, Ackergill Tower, three miles (five kilometres) north of Wick, was granted to William Keith, 4th Earl Marischal and Lady Margaret Keith, his wife. Nine years later, George, Earl of Caithness, and others seized the tower house, taking hostage Alexander Keith, captain of the castle, and John Scarlet, his servitor, who were imprisoned in Girnigoe, Braal Castle, and other places. They were charged with treason but were granted remission by Queen Mary.

In 1583, when George Sinclair, 4th Earl of Caithness, died at Edinburgh, his heart was brought to Wick where it was encased in lead and placed in Sinclair's aisle at the church of Wick. However, it entered the story of Wick once again in 1588 when Wick suffered at the hands of Alexander Gordon, 12th Earl of Sutherland, in his campaign against the 5th Sinclair Earl of Caithness, who had killed his kinsman. While Sinclair and his men concealed themselves in Girnigoe Castle nearby, Sutherland proceeded to burn the town of Wick, "an achievement of no great difficulty, as the place at that time merely consisted of a few mean straggling houses thatched with straw". All structures in the town except the church were burned. During the chaos of the fire, a Highlander intent on plundering the church broke open the lead case which contained the heart of the late Earl of Caithness, and, disappointed that no treasure was in the casque, flung the heart into the wind.

In 1589, James VI made the town into a royal burgh in favour of the fifth Earl of Caithness.

=== 17th century ===
Wick did not escape the turbulence of the Reformation period when, in 1613, the Anglican archdeacon Richard Merchiston of Bower, a graduate of the University of Edinburgh, was brought into Caithness by Bishop Patrick Forbes. Merchiston, a zealous iconoclast, angered the Catholic townspeople when he broke up the stone sculpture of St. Fergus, the town's patron saint. At first yielding to the city authorities who tried to prevent violence, a band of men nevertheless are said to have followed the parson as he returned home in the evening, took him by force, and drowned him in the Wick River. When questioned about the murder, they alleged that it had been the work of the saint himself, whom they claimed they had seen astride Merchiston, holding his head below the water. It should be noted, however, that John Horne, writing in his book of anecdotes about Wick, avers that a letter written by Merchiston with a later date than 1613 "either destroys the entire story or discredits the date of his death."

In 1680, the last clan battle in Scotland took place two miles (three kilometres) west of Wick at Altimarlach, involving a dispute between Campbell of Glenorcy and the Sinclairs over the earldom of Caithness. The Sinclairs headquartered in Wick, where they became the victims of a cunning stratagem by an agent of Glenorchy, who ordered that a ship loaded with whisky, "the nectar of Caithness", come to ground nearby, presuming the Sinclairs would imbibe the drink in quantity. He was not wrong. The next morning, weakened by their revels of the night before, the Sinclairs marched out to meet the Campbells and were ambushed at Altimarlach. Nearly all the Sinclairs were driven into the river and drowned.

In 1695, the minutes of the Caithness Presbytery reported that the industries of the town included "shoemaking, glovemaking, lacemaking, candlemaking, snuff making, lintspinning, and weaving, with, of course, building, and joinering."

At Wick, on 12 October 1698, the Presbytery noted that after sorcerers were expelled from Orkney, "sorcery and witchcraft abound[ed] so much" in the parish of Wick that they recommended their banishment from "this town and country."

=== 18th century ===
In the eighteenth century, the people of Wick were Gaelic-speakers, but according to a presbytery report of 1707, they could understand English.

In 1750, the building which housed the Town Hall and Burgh Jail was erected.

When Robert Forbes, appointed episcopal Bishop of Caithness in 1762, arrived in the county, he discovered there was no minister at Wick, but he is known to have held services and performed confirmations at the "house of Mr. Campbell" there.

In the year of his arrival, Bishop Forbes reported that every year on the morning of the Feast of Innocents Day (28 December), the people of Wick and its environs would gather for prayer at the ruins of the Chapel of St. Tear near Noss Head. In ruins at the time, the chapel had originally been made of stone and mortar without any lime, leaving little gaps in the wall into which people would press offerings of bread, cheese, and money. He left this description of the event:

In the afternoon, they get music—a piper and fiddler—and dance on the green where the chapel stands. The roof is off, but the walls are almost entire. One of the late Presbyterian preachers of Wick thought to have abolished this old practice; and for that end appointed a Diet of catechising in that corner of the parish upon the day of the Holy Innocents, but not one attended him; all went, as usual, to St. Tear's Chapel. I saw the font-stone for baptism lying on the green at the east end of the chapel. Mr. Sutherland, of Wester, observed that no doubt it has been called the Chapel of St. Tear from the tears of the parents and other relations of the murdered innocents.

The Rev. Charles Thomson, a nineteenth-century minister of the Free Church of Wick, stated in the New Statistical Account of Scotland that, though the bread and cheese were intended for the souls of the slain children, a dog-keeper in the neighbourhood would take the food out and feed it to the hounds.

In 1795, Sir John Sinclair raised a second battalion for the Rothesay and Caitness Fencibles (defencibles), which was to be sent to Ireland. In 1929, a Caithness man, age 86, remembered his grandfather's service in Ireland and remarked on the status of the language of Caithness, saying: "My grandfather was a Reay (a parish on the Sutherland Caithness border) man and spoke Gaelic, but my grandmother was born in Wick and like all 'Wickers' was unable to speak Gaelic."

=== 19th century ===
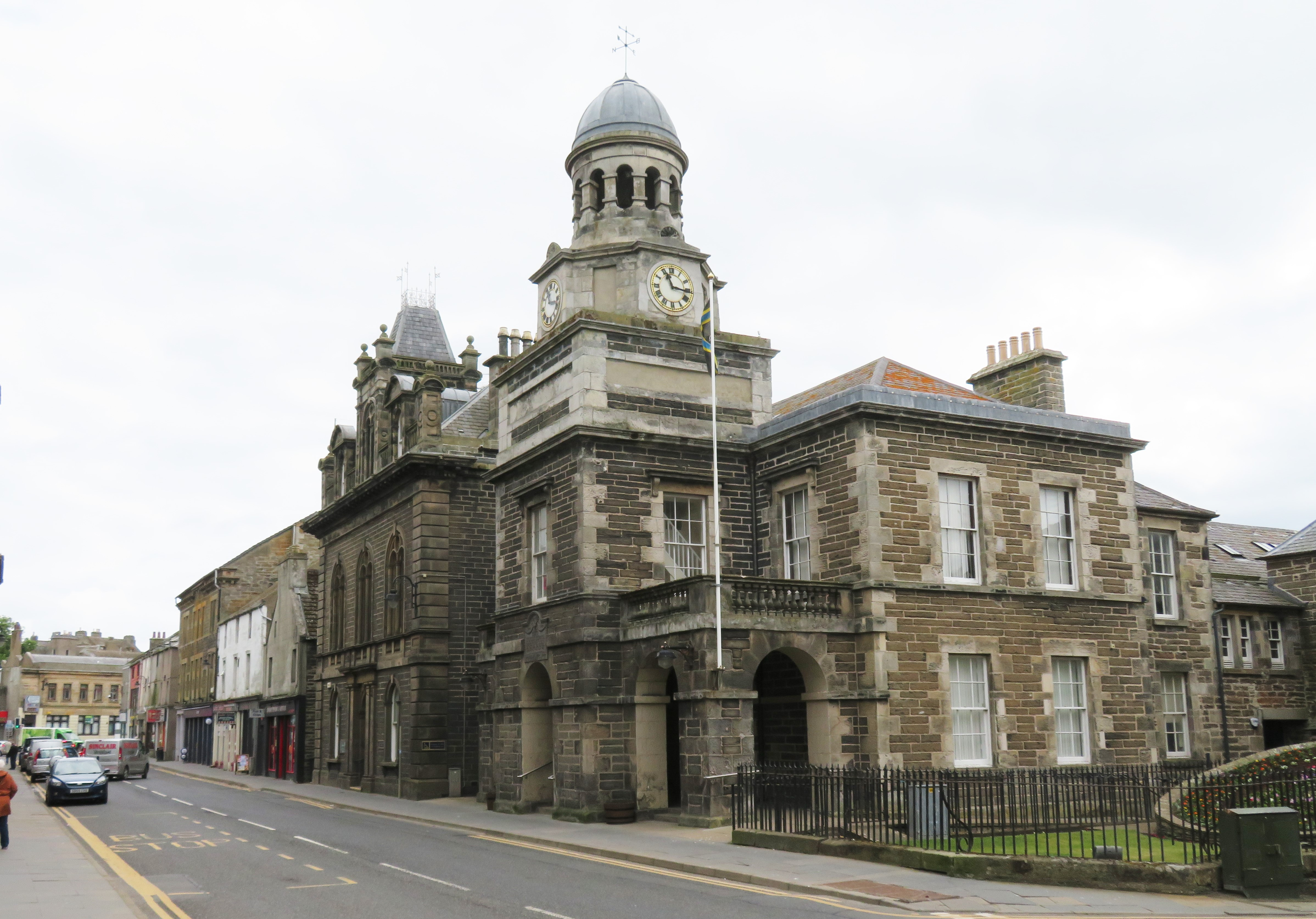
Wick Town Hall

In the late eighteenth century, the British Fishery Society had established fishing ports at Tobermory (1787) and Ullapool (1788), but when shoals of herring normally plentiful in the area moved away from the west coast, authorities turned toward Wick as a good prospect for the herring industry. Construction of Wick Harbour began in 1803 and was completed by 1811. It soon became a bustling harbour with ships from the Isles, the coast of Scotland, Wales, Shetland, and the Isle of Man. With the rise in fisheries, the size of the town increased, and Wick replaced Thurso as the centre of both shipping and trade in Caithness.

In 1800 a bridge was built at Wick, before which travellers from the south could only cross over into Wick via a footbridge of eleven pillars connected by planks. (Calder 32) In 1803 the Highland Roads Act allowed that the "Parliamentary" road which ran from Inverness to Thurso be extended from the Ord to Wick and then to Thurso, construction of which was completed in 1811. (C&S 67) In 1818, the mail coach, which was already running between Inverness and Tain, extended its reach by passing Bonar Bridge and the Ord to Wick and Thurso, which offered better communication between Wick and the south of Scotland.

In 1806, Wick Baptist Church was founded, first meeting in a small loft in Kirk Lane, and later moving into a newly built Church in Union Street in 1865. Wick Town Hall was completed in 1828.

Pulteneytown was founded in 1808 to provide space for the many Scots displaced by the Highland Clearances, who poured to the coast in search of work in the fishing industry. By the 1840s it was reported there were over 1,000 herring boats in the harbour alongside a large curing industry which had been developed around the harbour.

In 1830, two years after the old town hall and jail gave way to the new one, the upstairs floor of the latter was the site of cock fight balls, dancing schools, and the administrative functions of the town.

The Roman Catholic Church of St Joachim was consecrated in 1836, being the first Catholic church in Caithness since the Reformation, initially serving seasonal Irish labourers working in the herring industry. It was built on land given to Walter Lovi in gratitude for his ministry to the community during an epidemic of cholera.

Two newspapers were established in Wick in the nineteenth century: the John o' Groat Journal in 1836 and the Northern Ensign in 1850, both of which are said to have espoused Liberal views in politics.

Navigation was an ongoing challenge for vessels in the bay of Wick. In 1804 the Two Brothers schooner from Sunderland was wrecked in the bay with the loss of all crew and passengers. In April 1836 the brig Lalla Rookh was driven onto rocks at Elzy, described as a few miles east of Wick, on her way from Newcastle upon Tyne to Quebec in ballast under the command of Captain Green, during a severe easterly gale.

The population in 1841 was 1,333.

From 18 to 19 August 1848, Wick was among the places affected by the Moray Firth fishing disaster. Thirty seven men lost their lives.

In 1868, Robert Louis Stevenson stayed in Wick while his uncle, Alan Stevenson, a lighthouse engineer, was overseeing the construction of the nearby Noss Head Lighthouse, which opened in 1869. Stevenson was later to write about Wick. (See below under Historic descriptions of Wick.)

In 1884, John Richard Blakiston reported that boat building, rope making, and the herring fishery provided most of the employment for the 8,000 inhabitants of Wick.

In the spring of 1895, the local poet George Wallace Levack claimed to have encountered fairies at the top of the Fairy Hillock 1.25 miles (2.0 km) north of Wick. Reciting his poem to the Queen of the Fairies, he reached the passage that said, "Queen of Fairies appear." As the story goes, immediately upon his uttering the words, about "200 figures appeared dancing and whirling in a circle" in the middle of which was the Fairy Queen. This fanciful encounter was reported in John O'Groats Journal on 19 April. The Fairy Hillock is associated with a cairn on the right bank of the River Wick, about 1.25 miles (2.0 km) north of the town.

=== 20th century ===
From 1922 to 1947, Wick imposed prohibition on its residents.

Captain Ernest Edmund "Ted" Fresson, OBE, the founder of Highland Airways Limited, established the first air service at Wick, using a grass field one nautical mile (two kilometres) north of town. On 8 May 1933, Fresson's company began its first scheduled service between Inverness, Wick and Kirkwall.

In 1939, the field was put under the authority of the Air Ministry and turned into an RAF base. The field was improved with hard runways, hangars, and other buildings, and became one of fourteen airfields ranging from Iceland to North Yorkshire administered by No. 18 Group, RAF Coastal Command, whose headquarters was at Pitreavie, Fife.

Pilots flying from Wick engaged in reconnaissance, anti-submarine patrols, convoy escort, defence of Scapa Flow and strikes against the Germans in Norway and Norwegian waters. The plane most frequently used was the Lockheed Hudson.

In May 1940, Wick came under frequent air attack after the defeat of the Netherlands and Denmark and the occupation of Norway left Wick more vulnerable, and their defence of Scapa Flow and the harbour area made them a target. It is stated that 222 high explosives were dropped on Caithness, and that Wick proper was attacked six times. The first and most serious bombing was on 1 July 1940, when a bomb fell on Bank Row during daytime hours when children were playing outside, the first daytime bombing in the UK. Fifteen people were killed, eight of them children. Four shops and four houses were completely destroyed in Bank Row, and in Rose Street several houses were damaged.

=== Fishing ===
In the years before the First World War, the trade in cured herring with the Continent was well-established, with most of the fish being sent to Germany and Russia. The OS Map of Wick from 1907 shows that, at that time, in addition to the main harbour, there were a number of smaller harbours on the northern side of Wick River. The railway terminus had a number of sidings, an engine shed and a turntable; the line to Lybster was in operation, and the rope works were still in business. There were two weirs on the river, and access to the harbour from the north was by means of a swing bridge. The War had a disruptive effect on the trade, terminating export to Russia and introducing uncertainty in financial dealings with Germany, but the following statistics show that prior to the "primal catastrophe of the 20th Century", Wick's fishing industry was developing well. While the number of fishing vessels was dropping, the total tonnage was steady, and the drop in the number of fishermen employed is indicative of improving productivity. Unlike the situation in smaller fishing ports such as Lybster and Latheronwheel which went into decline, the quantity and value of the fish landed both increased.:

Fishery Statistics

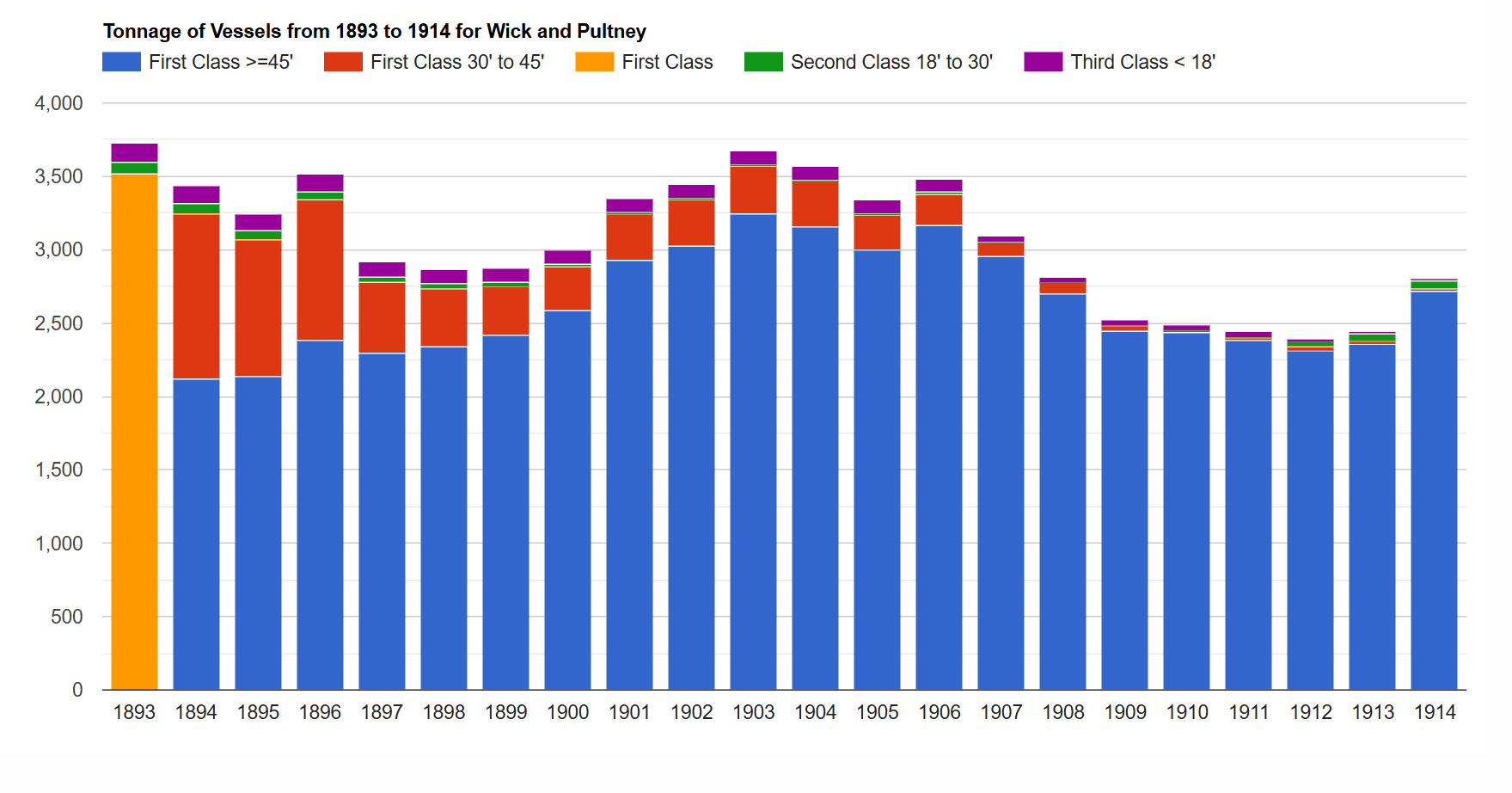
Tonnage of vessels

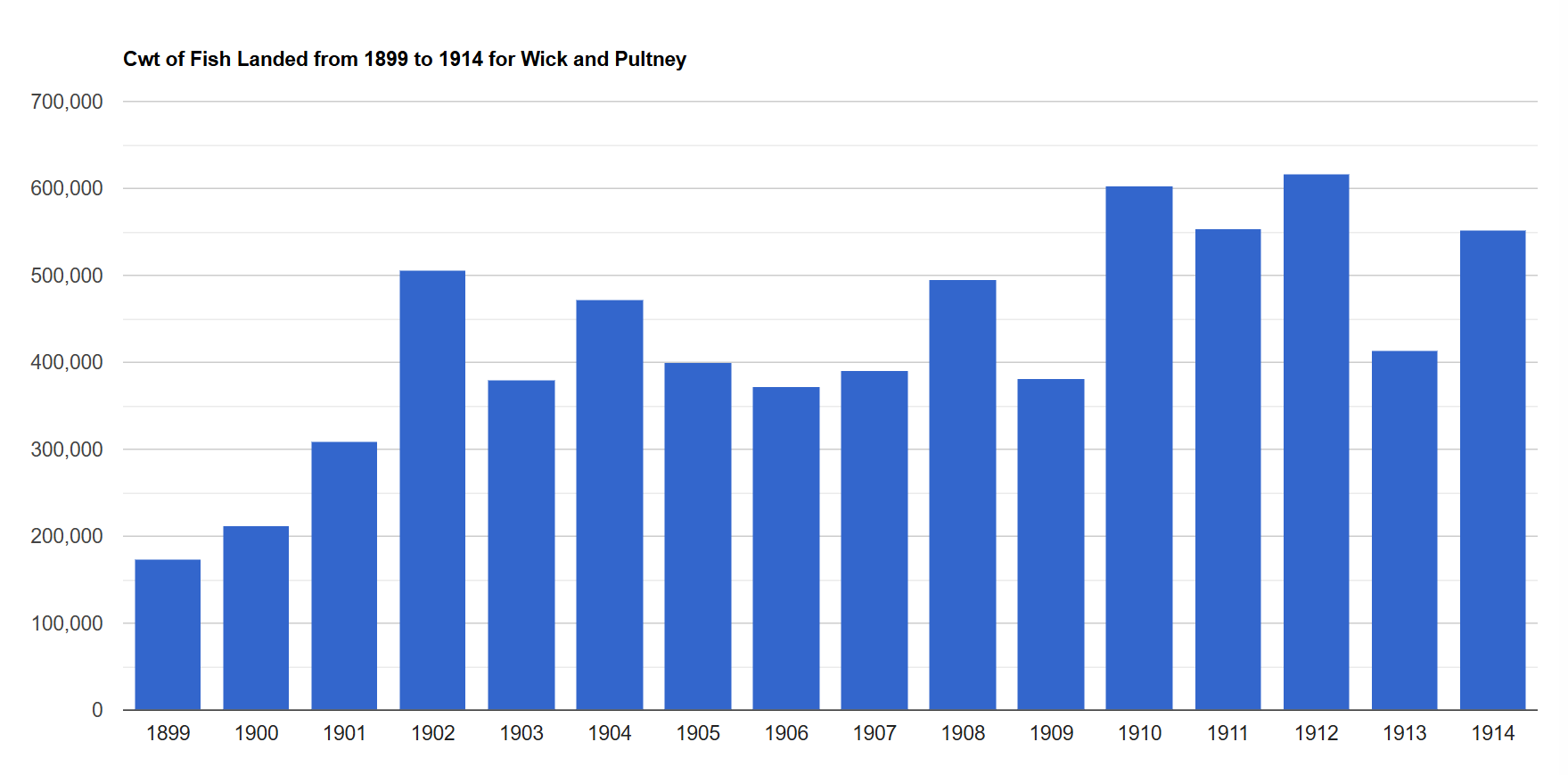
Cwt of fish landed

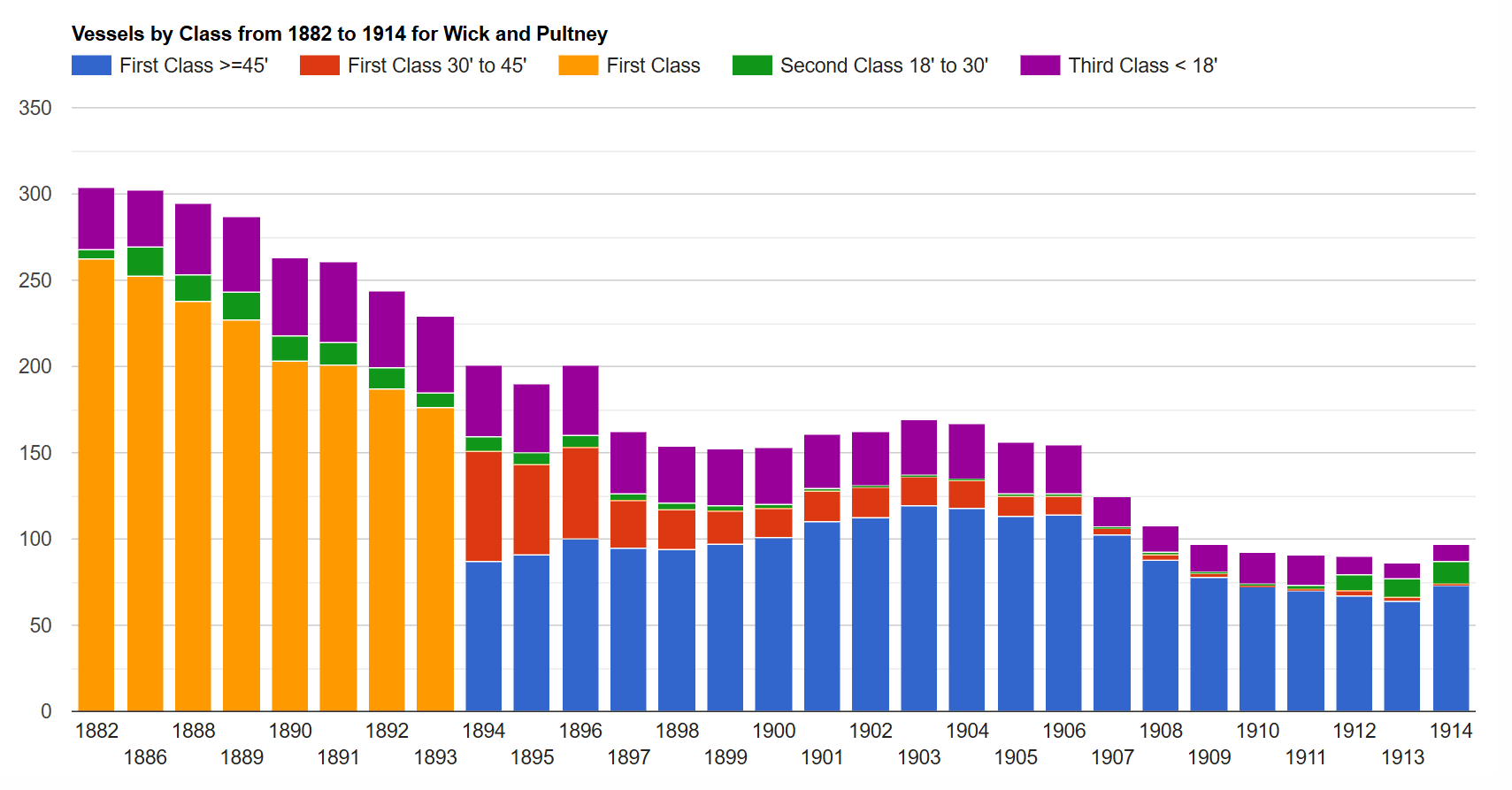
Vessels by class

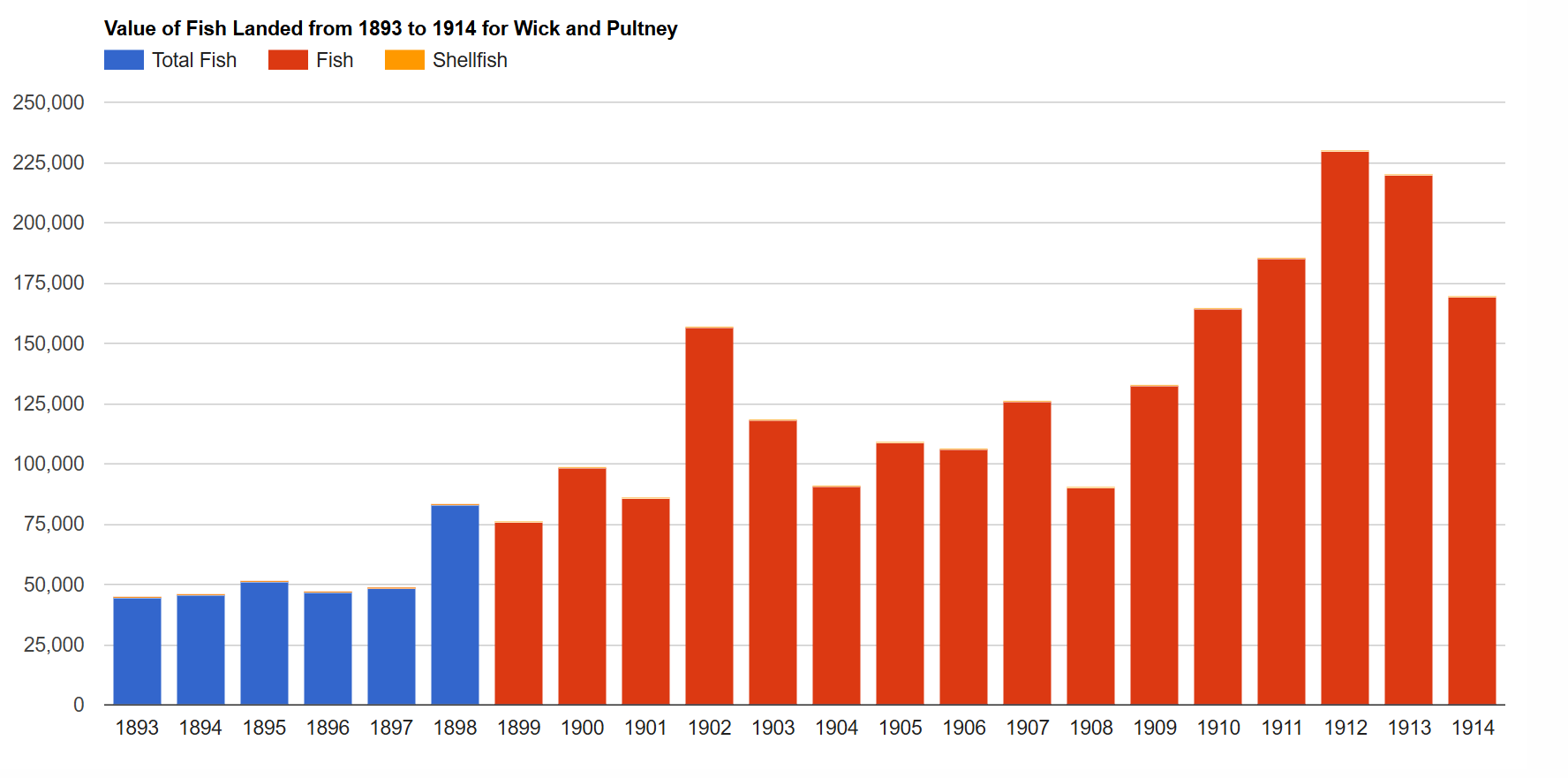
Value (£] of fish landed

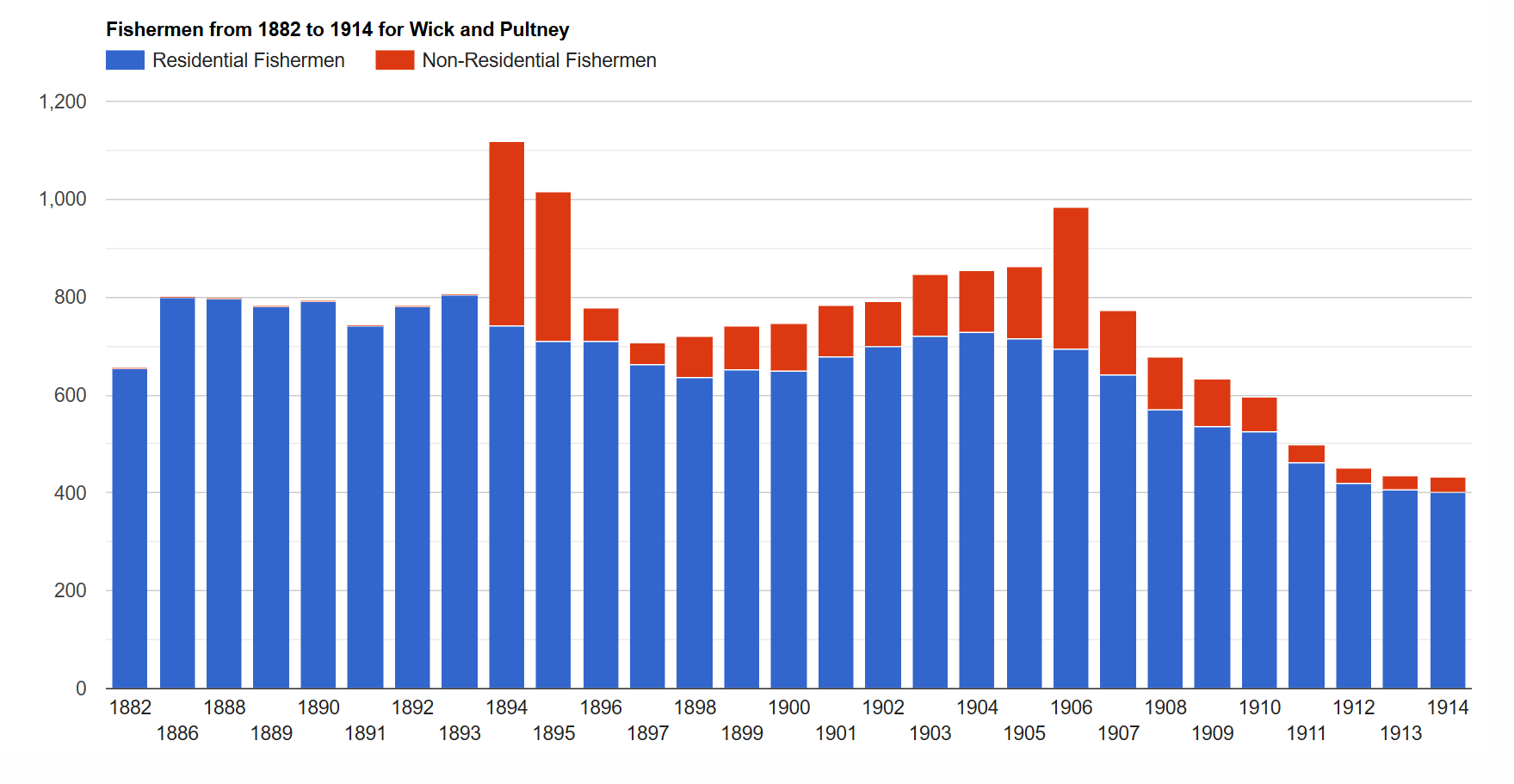
Fishermen

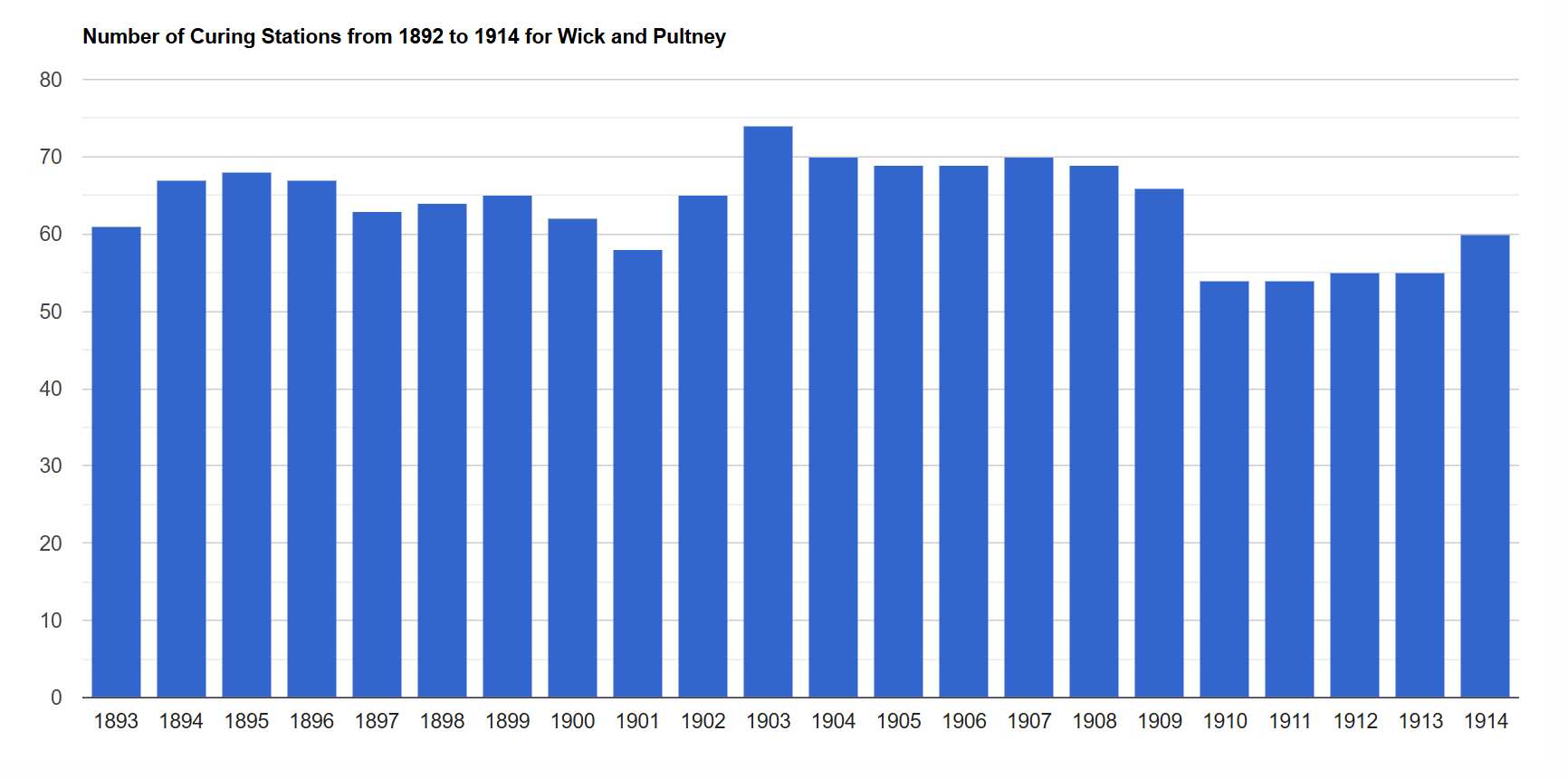
Number of curing stations

== Historic descriptions of Wick ==
In 1726, a writer described the town of Wick this way:

The burgh of Wick, a small toun of little trade, lyes on the east end of the church and north side of the water, where it runs into the sea, and before it, is a bay formed more than a mile in between the Head of Wick on the north and the Head of Old Wick on the south with a harbour at the end of the toun to which ships of between 20 and 30 last burden can come in safely. There is a bridge at the toun of Wick for the convenience of the parish of eleven pillars built with loose stones and only timber laid over them. They are maintained by the south side of the parish for carrying them to the church, the water being broad there by the swelling of the tide.

In 1787, an itinerant schoolteacher drew this picture of education in Wick:

The two most celebrated seminaries for females that I have any recollection of in Wick during the olden time were Mrs. Mary Groat's, a cousin of John's, and Mrs. Madge Macleod's. Desks, seats, and the fine arts were alike unknown in these primitive days, and the favourite position of the interesting creatures as they pursued their literary studies was that of squatting, Indian fashion, on the floor or, in the phraseology of the time, on their currie-hunkers. Scotch was taught in the approved Caithness fashion, but English was totally unknown. Spelling was considered quite superfluous, and, as to grammar, I question whether the word was ever heard pronounced between the Kirk and the Shore. A few sheets of writing paper were, by some inconceivable process, scrawled over with hieroglyphics, which it required no small talent to decipher, but, then, the mammas of the time had the satisfaction of being conscious that their daughters were unable to pen anything in the shape of billet doux. Music, drawing, French, &c., were all totally out of the question. A vagrant dancing master came occasionally to the town to put life and mettle into their heels, but grace and manner were completely neglected. Such was female education.

In 1868, Scottish author Robert Louis Stevenson stayed in Wick while his uncle, Alan Stevenson, a lighthouse engineer, was overseeing the construction of Noss Head Lighthouse, which opened in 1869. He wrote a letter to his mother describing the town:

Wick lies at the end or elbow of an open triangular bay, hemmed on either side by shores, either cliff or steep earth-bank, of no great height. The grey houses of Pulteney extend along the southerly shore almost to the cape; and it is about half-way down this shore – no, six-sevenths way down – that the new breakwater extends athwart the bay.

Certainly Wick in itself possesses no beauty: bare, grey shores, grim grey houses, grim grey sea; not even the gleam of red tiles; not even the greenness of a tree. The southerly heights, when I came here, were black with people, fishers waiting on wind and night. Now all the S.Y.S. (Stornoway boats) have beaten out of the bay, and the Wick men stay indoors or wrangle on the quays with dissatisfied fish-curers, knee-high in brine, mud, and herring refuse. The day when the boats put out to go home to the Hebrides, the girl here told me there was 'a black wind'; and on going out, I found the epithet as justifiable as it was picturesque. A cold, BLACK southerly wind, with occasional rising showers of rain; it was a fine sight to see the boats beat out a-teeth of it.

In Wick I have never heard any one greet his neighbour with the usual 'Fine day' or 'Good morning.' Both come shaking their heads, and both say, 'Breezy, breezy!' And such is the atrocious quality of the climate, that the remark is almost invariably justified by the fact. The streets are full of the Highland fishers, lubberly, stupid, inconceivably lazy and heavy to move. You bruise against them, tumble over them, elbow them against the wall – all to no purpose; they will not budge; and you are forced to leave the pavement every step.

To the south, however, is as fine a piece of coast scenery as I ever saw. Great black chasms, huge black cliffs, rugged and over- hung gullies, natural arches, and deep green pools below them, almost too deep to let you see the gleam of sand among the darker weed: there are deep caves too. In one of these lives a tribe of gipsies. The men are ALWAYS drunk, simply and truthfully always. From morning to evening the great villainous-looking fellows are either sleeping off the last debauch, or hulking about the cove 'in the horrors.' The cave is deep, high, and airy, and might be made comfortable enough. But they just live among heaped boulders, damp with continual droppings from above, with no more furniture than two or three tin pans, a truss of rotten straw, and a few ragged cloaks. In winter the surf bursts into the mouth and often forces them to abandon it.

== Geography ==
=== Wick River ===
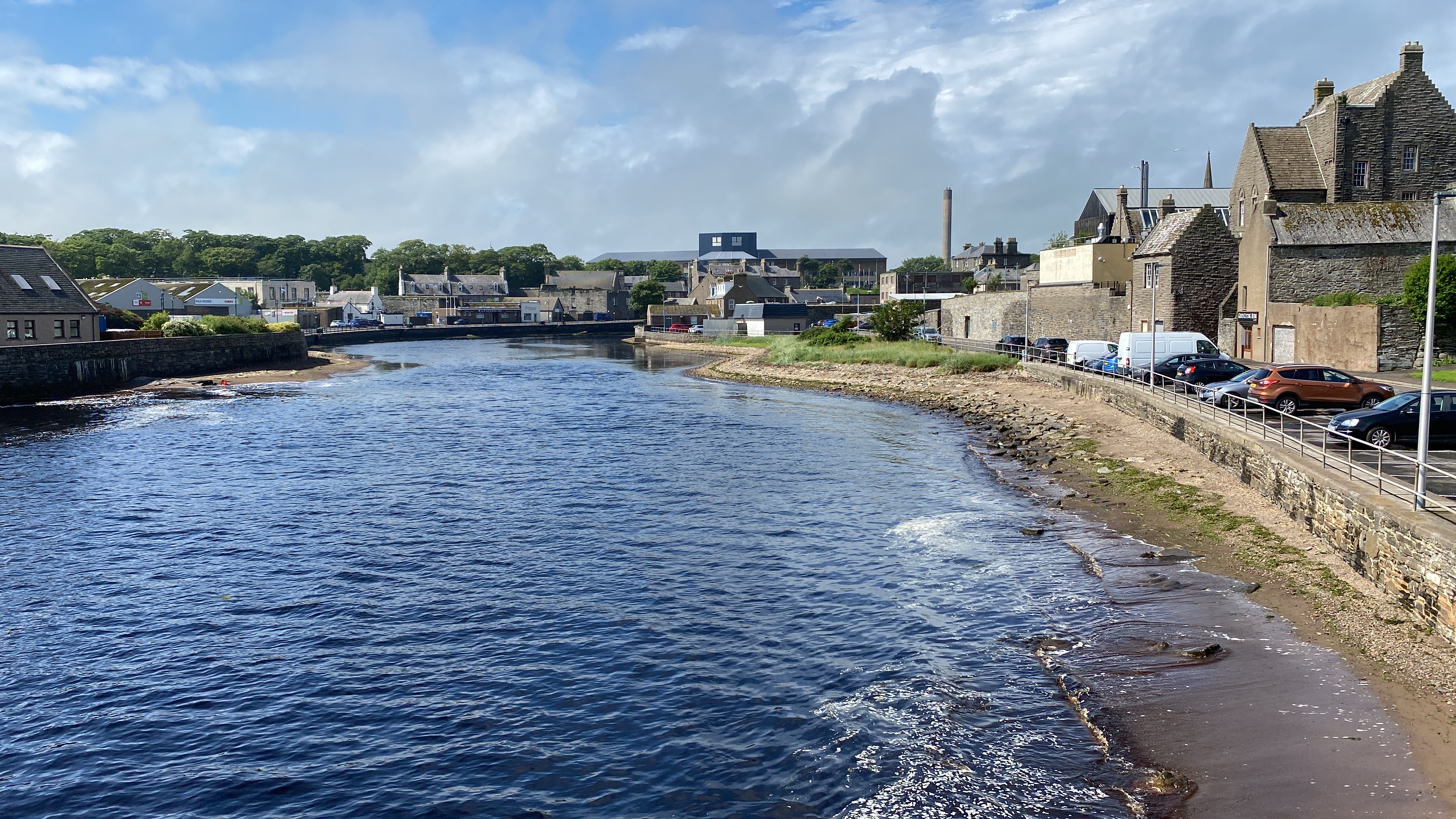
River Wick, looking toward Bridge Street, Wick

The town lies on the estuary of the Wick River, spanned by two road bridges. The Harbour Bridge spans the river at its mouth, to link Wick town centre with Wick Harbour and Pulteneytown. It stands instead of the earlier Service Bridge. Further upstream the Bridge of Wick carries the main road linking John o' Groats with Latheron and Inverness (the A99-A9).

=== Pulteneytown ===
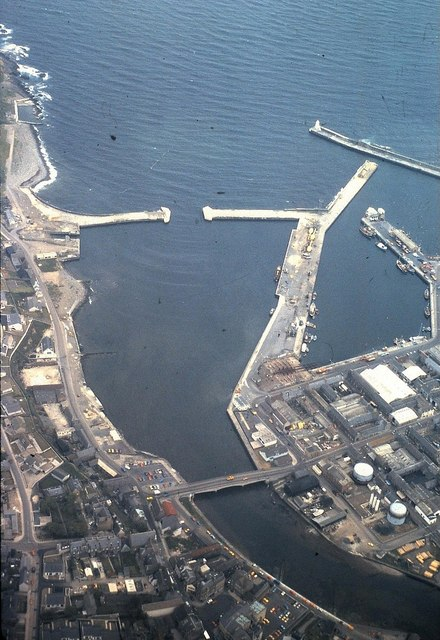
River Basin, Wick (1980)

Pulteney town is now an area of Wick on the south side of the River Wick. Until 1902 Pulteney town was administered separately from the Royal Burgh of Wick.

Pulteney town takes its name from Sir William Pulteney, a governor of the British Fisheries Society, who also commissioned Robert Adam to build the Pulteney Bridge in Bath. In the early years of the 19th century Sir William commissioned Britain's leading civil engineer, Thomas Telford, to design and supervise the creation of a major new herring fishing town and harbour at the estuary of the River Wick.

Pulteneytown was so named after the death of Sir William in 1805 and became a major player in the 19th-century herring boom. It was built in order to supply work to the Gaels evicted during the Highland Clearances. During this boom period the harbour was expanded still further by local shipbuilder James Bremner. History of this era is preserved in the collections of Wick Heritage Museum.

As created by the British Fisheries Society, Pulteneytown consisted of Lower Pulteney and Upper Pulteney. Lower Pulteney was primarily a working area, built on a sandbank behind the harbour. Upper Pulteney was primarily a residential area, on higher ground.

Pulteneytown Parish Church (of the Church of Scotland) is located in Argyle Square and was opened in 1842. Additional hall accommodation has been added and the main church completely renovated to a very high standard for the needs of a twenty-first century congregation. Services are held twice every Sunday.

The Old Pulteney whisky distillery is in the Pulteneytown area. The first Caithness Glass factory was also in this area, but Caithness Glass has now left both the town and Caithness, and is based in Crieff.

=== Wick Bay ===
Pulteney Harbour Act 1857
- Act of Parliament
- Parliament of the United Kingdom
- Long title: An Act to enable the British Fisheries Society to enlarge, improve, and maintain Pulteney Harbour in the County of Caithness; and for other Purposes.
- Citation: 20 & 21 Vict. c. xciii

Dates
- Royal assent: 27 July 1857

Text of statute as originally enacted

Pulteney Harbour Amendment Act 1862
- Act of Parliament
- Parliament of the United Kingdom
- Long title: An Act to authorize the British Fisheries Society to construct Piers or Breakwaters, and other Works in connexion with Pulteney Harbour, and to amend the Act relating thereto.
- Citation: 25 & 26 Vict. c. clxxx

Dates
- Royal assent: 29 July 1862
Other legislation
Repealed by	Pulteney Harbour Act 1879

Status: Repealed

Text of statute as originally enacted

Pulteney Harbour Act 1879
- Act of Parliament
- Parliament of the United Kingdom
- Long title: An Act for amending the Acts relating to the British Fisheries Society; for vesting in Trustees Pulteney Harbour, and improving and maintaining the same; and for other purposes.
- Citation: 42 & 43 Vict. c. cxlix

Dates
- Royal assent: 21 July 1879

Text of statute as originally enacted

Wick and Pulteney Harbours Act 1899
- Act of Parliament
- Parliament of the United Kingdom
- Long title: An Act to authorise the Wick and Pulteney Harbours Trustees to construct additional works to amend the Pulteney Harbour Act 1879 and the Wick and Pulteney Harbours Order 1883 and to confer further powers upon the Trustees and for other purposes.
- Citation: 62 & 63 Vict. c. lxxv

Dates
- Royal assent: 13 July 1899

Text of statute as originally enacted

Wick Bay is an isosceles triangle with the river mouth as its apex, and the points of South Head and North Head, separated by about one kilometre, as the base of the triangle. Beyond the heads lies the North Sea. Pentland Firth line about 11 kilometres north of North Head.

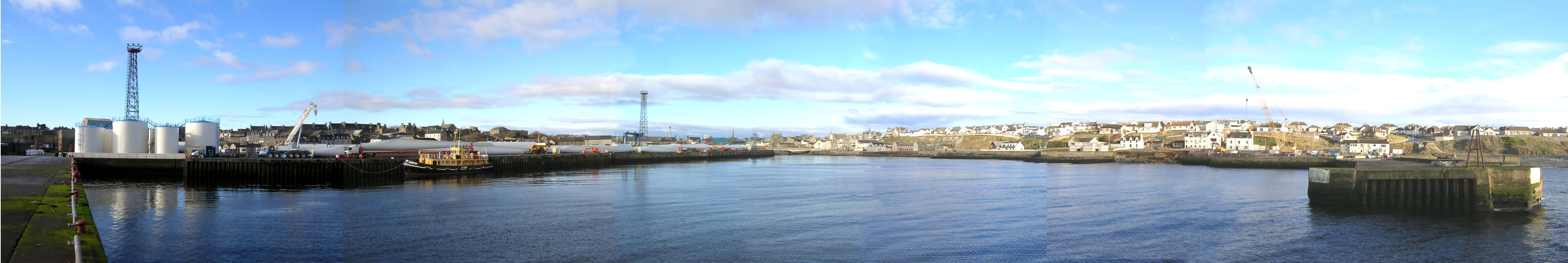
The River Harbour with the ex-RMAS Fleet Tender Ilchester and windmill blades to the left and the river in the centre. The Harbour Bridge is visible in the centre.

In 1864 The British Fisheries Society set out to add a new outer breakwater to the harbour, but despite a considerable capital outlay, it was effectively destroyed by storms in 1870 and 1872.

There are three harbours in Wick, the Outer Harbour, the Inner Harbour and the River Harbour, all of which are formed and protected by breakwaters. The Outer and Inner Harbours are on the south side of the estuary, divided from the River Harbour by a breakwater. The River Harbour straddles the river, with breakwaters on either side of an entrance about 30 m (98 ft) wide.

Wick Inner Harbour now has an extensive marina complex, known as a hub for leisure boating and visiting pleasure craft.

In 2012 a storm battered the harbour, causing extensive damage. In June 2016, another storm smashed a hole in the seawall.

==== Map references ====
Historical and current maps of Wick are available online.

	Latitude and longitude	Ordnance Survey grid reference
North Head	58°26′31″N 03°03′22″W	ND383508
South Head	58°25′55″N 03°03′58″W	ND377497
Wick Harbour	58°26′21″N 03°04′54″W	ND368505

=== Climate ===
Wick has an oceanic climate (Köppen Cfb), encompassing a narrow temperature range, low sunshine levels and high winds. Despite its far north location, close to the path of Atlantic depressions, rainfall averages below 800 mm (31 in) due to a rain shadow caused by mountains to the west.

Climate data for Wick (WIC), elevation: 36 m or 118 ft, 1991–2020 normals, extremes 1930–present
Month	Jan	Feb	Mar	Apr	May	Jun	Jul	Aug	Sep	Oct	Nov	Dec	Year
Record high °C (°F)	13.0 (55.4)	15.3 (59.5)	19.9 (67.8)	20.2 (68.4)	22.0 (71.6)	24.4 (75.9)	25.6 (78.1)	25.6 (78.1)	23.9 (75.0)	20.2 (68.4)	16.7 (62.1)	14.3 (57.7)	25.6 (78.1)
Mean daily maximum °C (°F)	6.4 (43.5)	6.7 (44.1)	8.1 (46.6)	10.0 (50.0)	12.0 (53.6)	14.3 (57.7)	16.2 (61.2)	16.3 (61.3)	14.7 (58.5)	11.8 (53.2)	8.9 (48.0)	6.8 (44.2)	11.0 (51.8)
Daily mean °C (°F)	4.0 (39.2)	4.1 (39.4)	5.2 (41.4)	6.9 (44.4)	8.8 (47.8)	11.2 (52.2)	13.1 (55.6)	13.3 (55.9)	11.8 (53.2)	9.2 (48.6)	6.4 (43.5)	4.3 (39.7)	8.2 (46.7)
Mean daily minimum °C (°F)	1.6 (34.9)	1.4 (34.5)	2.3 (36.1)	3.9 (39.0)	5.5 (41.9)	8.2 (46.8)	10.1 (50.2)	10.4 (50.7)	8.9 (48.0)	6.5 (43.7)	3.9 (39.0)	1.7 (35.1)	5.4 (41.7)
Record low °C (°F)	−11.1 (12.0)	−13.9 (7.0)	−10.5 (13.1)	−7.1 (19.2)	−3.9 (25.0)	−1.1 (30.0)	1.6 (34.9)	0.5 (32.9)	−2.0 (28.4)	−6.1 (21.0)	−10.8 (12.6)	−11.7 (10.9)	−13.9 (7.0)
Average precipitation mm (inches)	72.4 (2.85)	62.6 (2.46)	56.7 (2.23)	47.5 (1.87)	49.9 (1.96)	55.3 (2.18)	61.6 (2.43)	69.6 (2.74)	66.2 (2.61)	92.9 (3.66)	87.6 (3.45)	70.4 (2.77)	792.7 (31.21)
Average precipitation days (≥ 1.0 mm)	16.5	13.7	13.7	11.8	11.7	11.1	11.8	12.5	12.7	16.6	17.5	16.0	165.6
Mean monthly sunshine hours	51.1	72.7	115.4	146.4	190.9	147.5	136.8	137.1	118.6	90.9	58.6	37.6	1,303.5
Source 1: Met Office
Source 2: KNMI

== Governance ==
Wick has history as a royal burgh dating from 1589.

In 1975, under the Local Government (Scotland) Act 1973, the local government burgh was merged into the Caithness district of the two-tier Highland region. The lowest tier of governance is filled by the Royal Burgh of Wick Community Council which was also formed at that time.

In 1996, under the Local Government etc (Scotland) Act 1994, the district was abolished and the region became a unitary council area.

From 1996 until 2007, the town of Wick was covered by two or three wards, each electing one councillor by the first past the post system of election. This year, a single Wick ward was created to elect three councillors by the single transferable vote system. The new ward is one of three within the Highland Council's Caithness ward management area and one of seven within the council's Caithness, Sutherland and Easter Ross corporate management area.

From 2017 onwards, it was part of a new ward called Wick and East Caithness.

Wick is within the former civil parish of Wick. The parish has that of Latheron to the south, those of Watten and Bower to the west, and that of Canisbay to the north. The eastern boundary of the parish is Moray Firth coastline.

=== Parliamentary representation ===
Wick was a parliamentary burgh, combined with Dingwall, Dornoch, Kirkwall and Tain in the Northern Burghs constituency of the House of Commons of the Parliament of Great Britain from 1708 to 1801 and of the Parliament of the United Kingdom from 1801 to 1918. Cromarty was added to the list in 1832.

The constituency was a district of burghs known also as Tain Burghs until 1832, and then as Wick Burghs. It was represented by one Member of Parliament (MP). In 1918 the constituency was abolished and the Wick component was merged into the then new county constituency of Caithness and Sutherland.

== Economy ==
=== Caithness Glass ===
A specialist glass manufacturer was established in Wick in 1961. Production was progressively moved to Perth between 1979 and 2004. Manufacturing in Wick thus ceased and the physical connection with Caithness was severed. Caithness Glass manufactured the trophy for the BBC Mastermind television quiz programme.

=== Pulteney Distillery ===
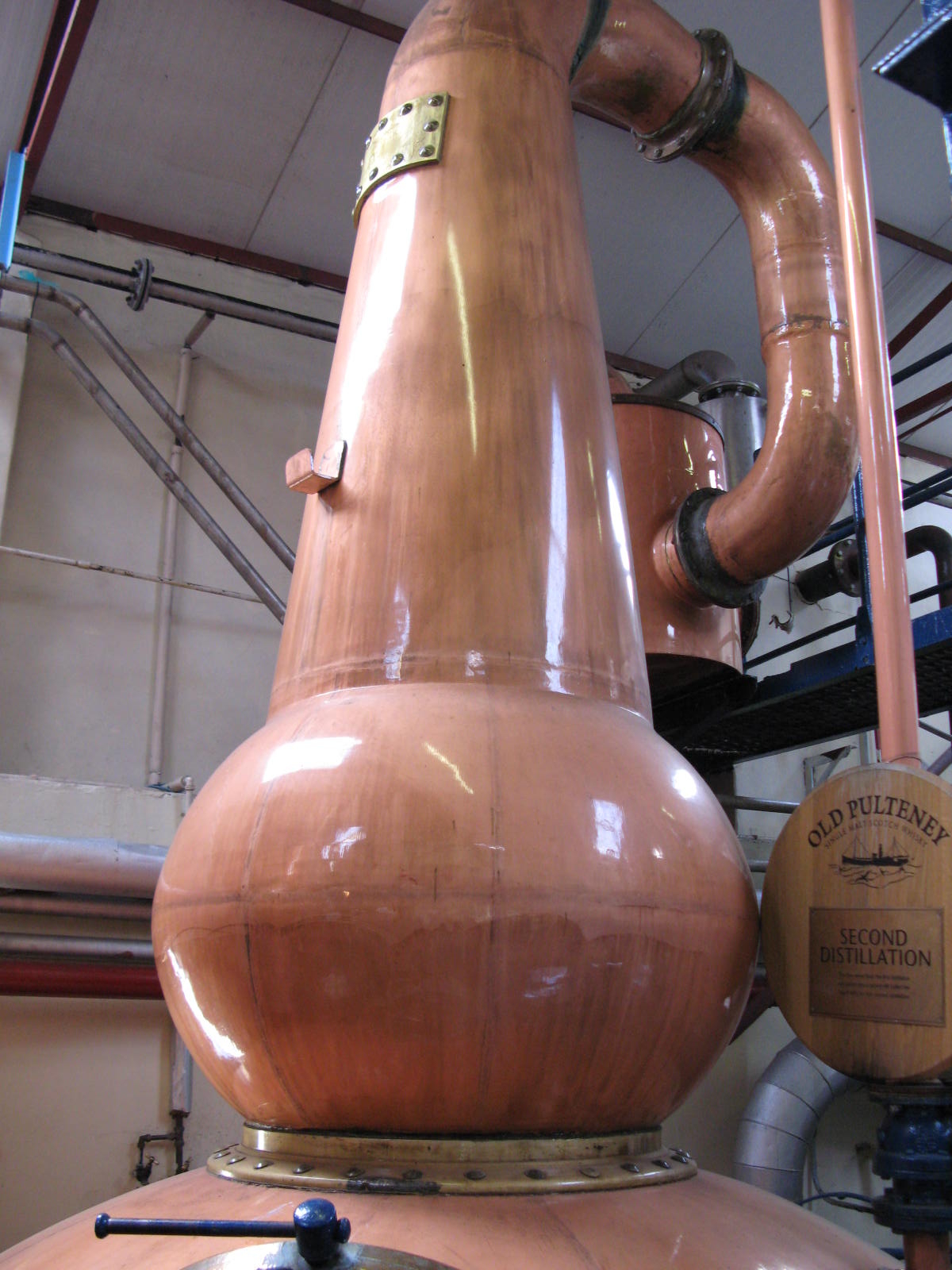
Pot still in Pulteney Distillery

The Pulteney Distillery is an aging malt whisky production facility in Pulteneytown. The distillery has a visitor centre in Huddart Street, and produces the Old Pulteney Single Malt whisky at a number of ages. Its 21-year-old single malt was named World Whisky of the Year by Jim Murray in his 2012 Whisky Bible.

Like Pulteneytown the distillery is named after Sir William Pulteney, 5th Baronet. The distillery was established in 1826 when Pulteneytown was quite newly established as a herring fishing port. The distillery is one of the most northerly on the Scottish mainland and was quite inaccessible, when established, except by sea. Barley was brought in by sea, and the whisky was shipped out the same way. At that time many of the distillery workers were also fishermen. Old Pulteney is promoted as a Highland single malt Scotch.

The distillery is now owned by Inver House Distillers Limited, a subsidiary of Thai Beverages. Other Inver House distilleries include the Speyburn-Glenlivet Distillery, Knockdhu Distillery, Balblair Distillery and Balmenach Distillery.

=== Ignis Wick Ltd ===
Ignis Wick Ltd operates the district heating scheme in Wick, and provides heat and hot water via underground insulated pipes to nearly 200 homes from a central boiler house. Formerly known as Caithness Heat and Power Limited (CHaP) it was owned by the Highland Council. Operations are based at the Pulteney distillery in Wick.

The council initiated the scheme, with origins evident in minutes of 16 December 2002 meeting of the council's Caithness committee. It was planned, originally, as a biomass-fuelled combined heat and power scheme, producing mains grid electricity as well as heat. The CHaP company was formed on 7 July 2005, as a non-profit company with three directors, representing the council, the Pulteneytown People's Project charity and the distillery owners.

The biomass gasification plant failed to work as intended, however, and what had been planned as temporary use of fossil-oil plant became a longer term arrangement. CHaP incurred significant financial losses of more than £13 million. Therefore, in 2008, the council had no real option except to take full, direct control of the company and, by February 2009, the council had to accept that the original biomass plant did not work economically.

Ignis Biomass Ltd took over the district heating scheme in 2012, and has installed a renewable energy biomass plant to replace the fossil-oil plant. As of 2013, the scheme supplies heat to the distillery and to nearly 200 homes, and Ignis plans to extend the heat supply to more homes.

=== Other businesses ===
Wick is the home of the Shore Scottish Seaweed Company which makes seaweed crisps. In July 2024 the company announced a major expansion.

== Landmarks ==
=== Castle of Old Wick ===
The Castle of Old Wick (58°25′24.09″N 3°4′53.91″W) was built in the 12th century when the Norwegian Earldom of Orkney included Caithness, and was united under Harald Maddadsson. The castle is thought to have been his stronghold on the mainland of Britain. There is evidence that the site was occupied before the present castle was built.

All that remains today is a tall tower sitting on the very edge of the cliffs, about 1/2 mile (800 metres) south of Wick Bay and of the modern town of Wick, but originally the castle had at least 4 stories as well as extra buildings containing workshops and other quarters.

During the 14th century it was owned by Sir Reginald de Cheyne who was a supporter of Edward I during his attempt to establish John Balliol as King of Scotland, although there is no evidence of a battle having taken place there. In July 1569 Lord Oliphant and his servants were attacked by the Master of Caithness, and besieged for 8 days in Old Wick or "Auldwick" castle. It was abandoned in the 18th century. The castle was built to the same plan as Brough Castle, which is about 29 kilometres to the north/northwest, on the Pentland Firth coast of Caithness.

=== Heritage Museum ===
Wick Heritage Museum is in Bank Row, Pulteneytown. The museum is run by the Wick Society, with a strong focus on the herring-boom era of Wick's history. The herring trade relied on the export of cured herring to the Continent (in particular, Stettin and St Petersburg) and languished after the First World War. The Johnston Collection, which was gathered by the local photographer's business between 1863 and 1975 provides a fascinating insight into the history of the town and the industry. The surviving collection contains around 50,000 images.

=== Carnegie Library ===
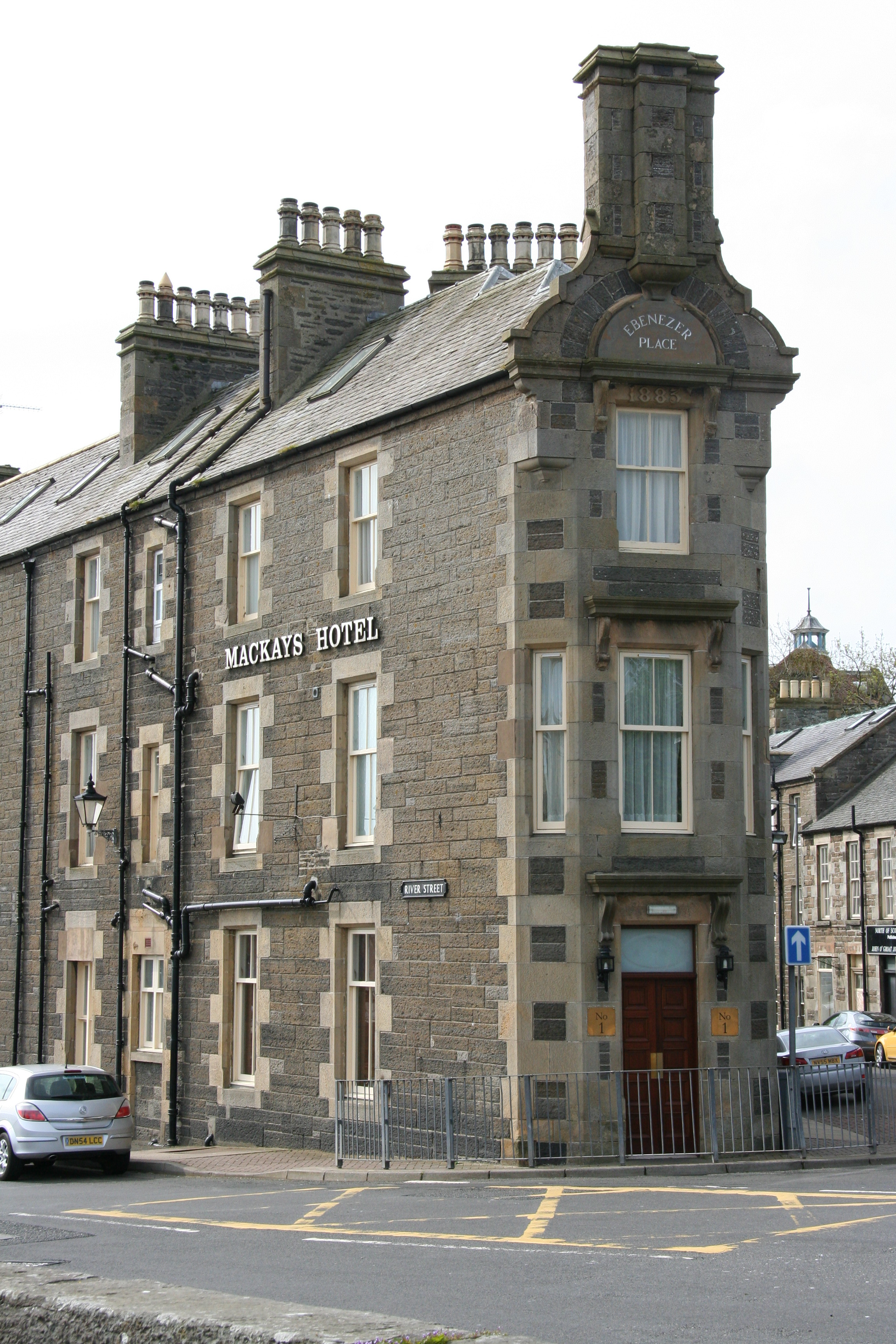
Ebenezer Place, Wick

The Wick Carnegie Library is now run by the Highland Council. As well as providing a general library service the library preserves valuable books and other documents about Wick and Caithness and their histories. Also it preserves a crocodile (Gavialis gangeticus) presented by Sir Arthur Bignold in 1909.

The library building also houses the North Highland Archive and the St. Fergus Gallery exhibitions. The North Highland Archive is part of the Highland Council Archive Service, and holds collections of official and private papers, the earliest dating from 1589, relating to Wick and the county of Caithness. Construction of the library building, 1897, was part funded by Andrew Carnegie. It is at the junction of Sinclair Terrace and Cliff Road.

The Caithness county archives were transferred from Wick library to Nucleus, the Nuclear and Caithness Archives near Wick Airport in February 2017. The Library is now a Food Bank.

=== HMS Jervis Bay memorial ===
A memorial was erected in 2006 in honour of nine local merchant seafarers who died in that ship's heroic 1940 naval battle with the German heavy cruiser Admiral Scheer.

=== Tourist Information Centre ===
The Tourist Information Centre is now located upstairs in the Mcallan's store on High Street.

=== World's shortest street ===
In 2006 the BBC reported that the Guinness Book of Records had confirmed the world's shortest street, Ebenezer Place measuring 2.06 metres, and containing just one door, was located in Wick (ND363508). It had not previously qualified for the record because it did not have a full postal address.

== Education ==
There are two primary schools in Wick, both run by the Highland Council. They are Noss Primary School and Newton Park Primary School. There is one secondary school in Wick, Wick High School. There were previously four primary schools in Wick, these being North Primary, Hillhead Primary (both merged to make Noss Primary), South Primary and Pultneytown Academy (both merged to make Newton Park Primary).

== Media ==
Television signals are received from either the Rumster Forest or Keelylang Hill TV transmitters.

Local radio stations are BBC Radio Scotland on 94.5 FM, BBC Radio Nan Gaidheal (for Gaelic listeners), MFR Radio on 96.7 FM, and Caithness FM, a community based radio station that broadcast on 106.5 FM.

The town is served by the local newspapers, John O'Groat Journal and Caithness Courier.

== Sports ==
- Wick Academy F.C. play in the Highland Football League.
- Wick Golf Club

== On film ==
There is surviving black and white, and colour, film footage of Wick and the Highlands in the National Library of Scotland. The 1967 children's film The Hunch, set in Wick, can be watched online for free.

== Twin towns ==
For twenty years the town was twinned with Klaksvík, Faroe Islands. In August 2015, Wick councillors threatened to break these ties on account of a Faroese long standing practice which involves hunting and eating migrating pilot whales. As of January 2016 the decision has been deferred.

== Notable people ==
- William Barclay, (1907–1978), theologian
- John Barneson, (1862–1941), businessman
- James Bremner, (1784–1856), naval architect, harbour builder and ship-raiser.
- Henry Horne, 1st Baron Horne, (1861–1929), commander of British First Army during World War I
- Charlotte McShane, (born 1990), Wick-born Australian triathlete
- Ewan Morrison, (born 1968), author and director
- Evan Oliphant, (born 1982), cyclist
- Alexander Henry Rhind, (1833–1863), Egyptologist
- Scott Sutherland, (1910–1984), sculptor
- Fiona Claire Bruce, (born 1957), MP for Congleton between 2010 and 2024
