= Old St Peter's Church, Thurso =

Ruined church in Thurso, Highland, Scotland

Coordinates: 58.596575°N 3.515042°W

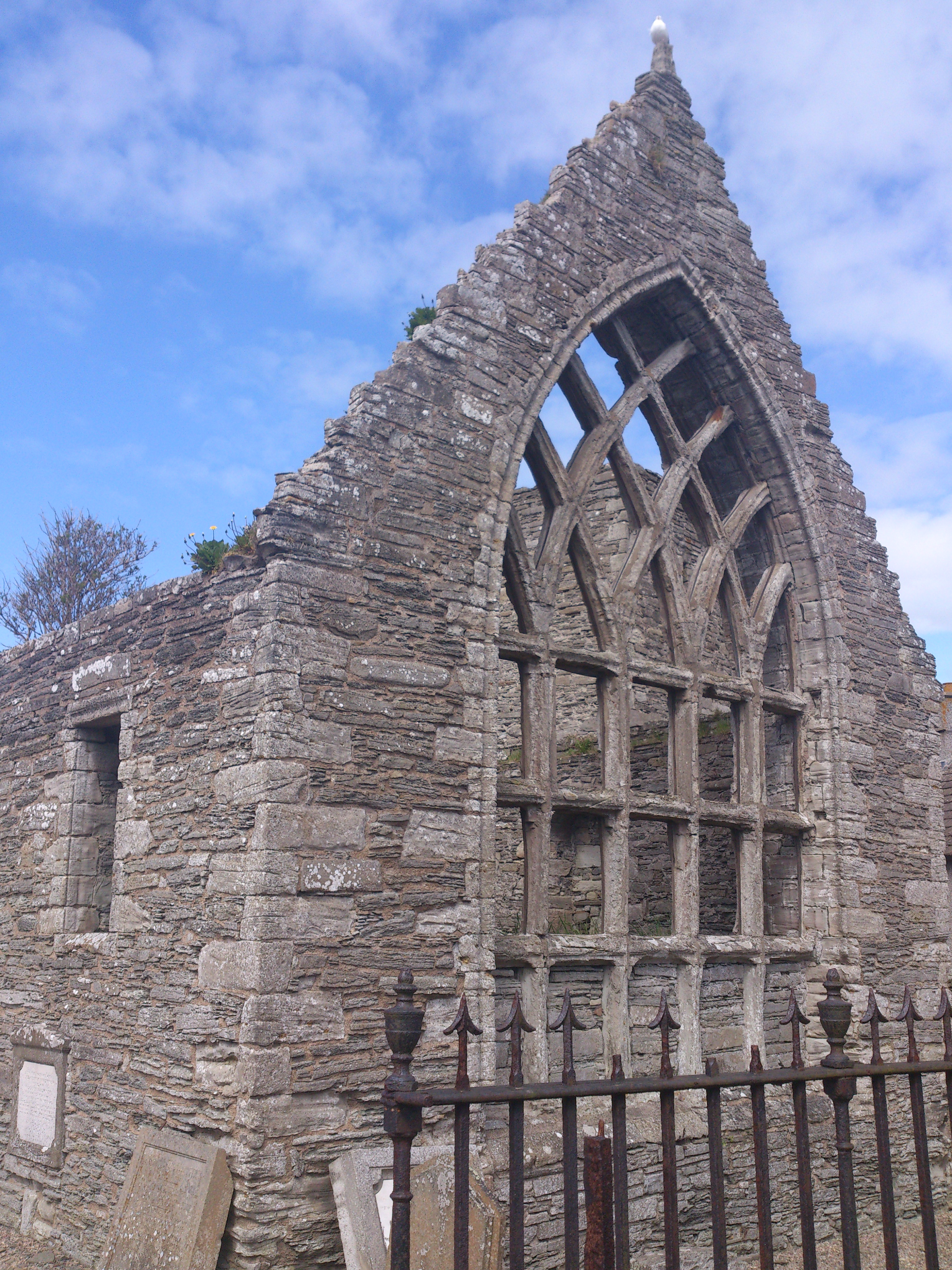
The old church

Auld St Peter's Kirk is a ruined parish church on Wilson Lane, in Thurso, Caithness, Scotland. Dedicated to Saint Peter, it dates to at least 1125, and at one time was the principal church for the county, administered by the Bishops of Caithness. It became a scheduled monument in 1929 and from 1975 until 2016 it was also a Category A listed building.

== History ==
The church of Thurso is dedicated to Saint Peter. Though unnamed in the charter of Bishop Gilbert, it was one of the six reserved by him to the bishopric. Early in the 16th century, the vicarage of Thorso was held by Sir John Mathesoun chancellor of Caithness, on whose demission or otherwise Queen Mary in 1547 presented Master John Craig to the benefice. Master Walter Innes, who appears in record in 1554, was vicar of Thurso in 1560, and continued to hold the vicarage between 1561 and 1566. About 1567, John Rag was minister, and in 1574, Alexander Urquhart was minister of Olrik and Thurso, and John Davidsoun was reader at Thurso. In 1641, Alexander Monro, minister at Durnoch had from King Charles I, a grant of 800 marks Scots or of eight chalders victual in augmentation of his stipend from the rents of the bishopric in the parish of Thurso and elsewhere.

Old St Peter's, still standing, was disused since 1832 when a replacement church was built for the parish. That church, St Andrew's and St Peter's, is of Gothic style and was built to a design by William Burn.

== Architecture ==
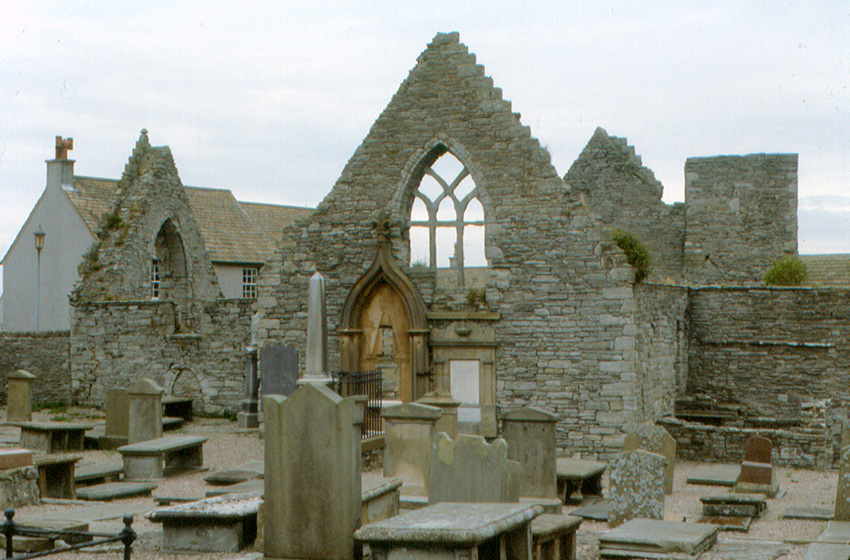
Old St Peter's Church and its wall, with gravestones in the foreground

It is cruciform and in the pointed style. A 1726 record states, "Above a vault looking into the east end of the church is a session house, but by the permission of the kirk session, it is used by the sheriff and magistrates of Thurso for a court house and prison; and above a dungeon likewise allowed them is a steeple and common clock". The now roofless structure was built using local rubble stone.

== Grounds ==
The structure is situated on the left bank of the River Thurso, close to the seafront. It is enclosed behind a rubble-slab wall. A complaint was made in 1786 regarding dung and rubbish being dumped on graves. In 2013, five gravestones were toppled and smashed.
