= Loch More, Caithness =

Lake in Scotland

Loch More
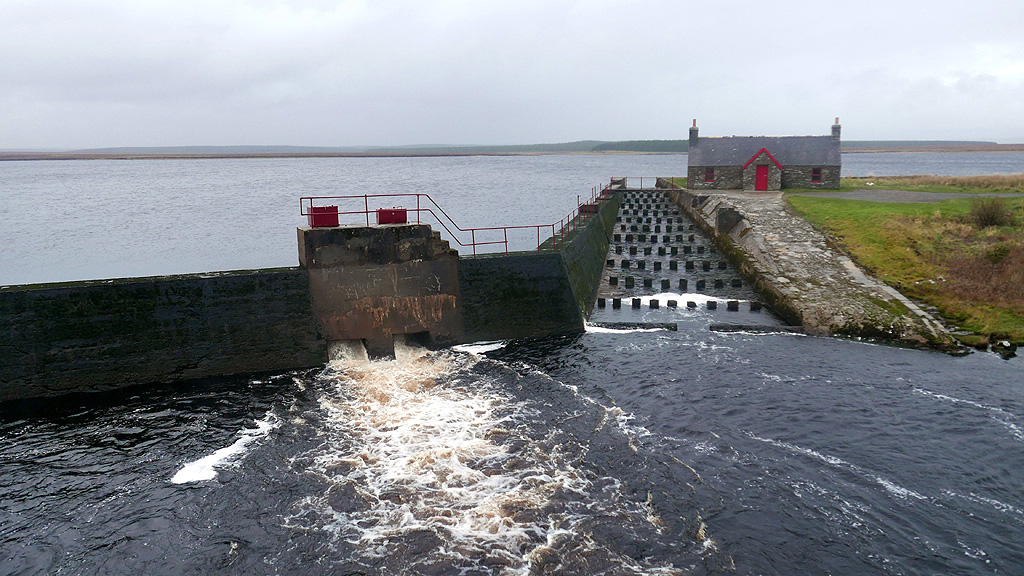
- Outflow from Loch More

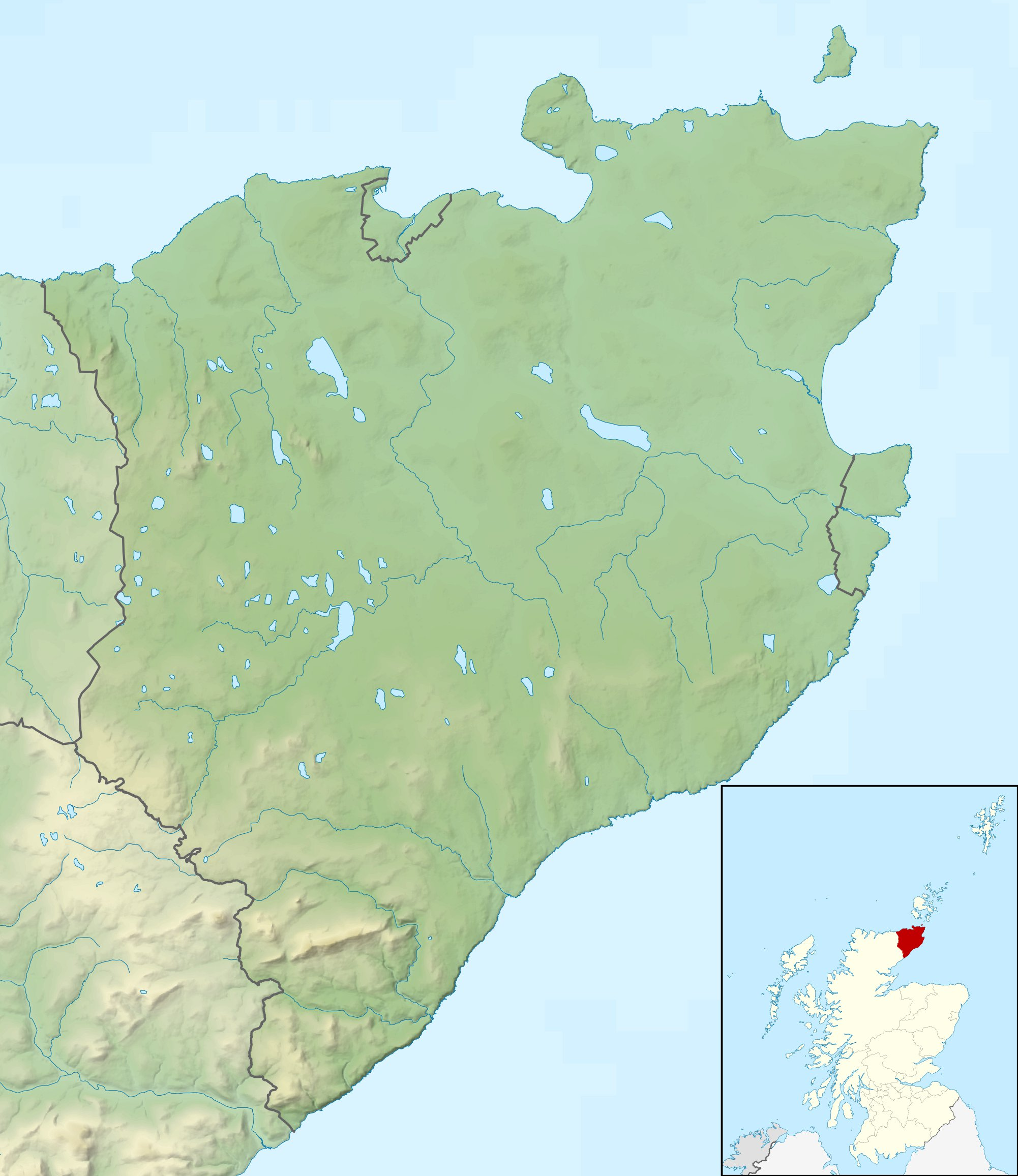
- Location within Caithness
- Location: Caithness, Scotland
- Coordinates: 58°23′16″N 3°34′44″W
- Type: loch
- Primary inflows: River Thurso
- Primary outflows: River Thurso
- Catchment area: 67.5 mi^{2} (175 km^{2})
- Basin countries: Scotland
- Max. length: 1.7 mi (2.7 km)
- Max. width: 1/3 mi (0.54 km)
- Surface area: 511 acres (0.8 mi^{2}; 2.1 km^{2})
- Max. depth: 27 ft (8.2 m)
- Surface elevation: 393 ft (120 m)

Loch More (great Loch in Gaelic) is a freshwater loch in Caithness, Scotland, about 14 miles (23 kilometres) south of Thurso. It is a shallow flat-bottomed basin, in common with most of the nearby lochs.

The overflow from the loch is taken by the River Thurso, which, after a windy course of 26 miles (42 kilometres), flows into the Pentland Firth at the town of Thurso. The main inflow comes from the Sleach Water and the upper part of the River Thurso (also known here as Strathmore water). The latter is formed by a union of Rumsdale Water (source Rumsdale Loch) and Glut Water, whose source to the south-west is at a height of around 1,400 ft (430 m), about 14 miles (23 kilometres) upstream from Loch More.

The loch was originally an irregular round shape, less than a mile across, with a surface area of about 177 acres (0.3 square miles; 0.7 square kilometres). The average depth was only 7 ft (2.1 m) reaching a maximum of about 15 ft (4.6 m). However, in 1907-1908 a dam was built at the outflow into the River Thurso, which raised the level of the loch by 12 ft (3.7 m). Its purpose was to control the amount of water in the downstream River Thurso, thus improving the quality of salmon fishing. As a result, the area of the loch increased to 511 acres (0.8 square miles; 2.1 square kilometres), with a depth up to a maximum of 27 ft (8.2 m), depending on the amount of water discharged. The length of the loch is now 1.7 miles (2.7 kilometres).

The area draining into Loch More is about 67.5 square miles (175 square kilometres), an area 240 times greater than the original size of the loch, an unusually large catchment area for such a small body of water.

The loch is about 393 ft (120 m) above sea level.
