= List of listed buildings in Thurso, Highland =

This is a list of listed buildings in the parish of Thurso in Highland, Scotland.

== List ==
Name	Location	Date Listed	Grid Ref. (Note: Sometimes known as OSGB36, the grid reference (where provided) is based on the British national grid reference system used by the Ordnance Survey. • "Guide to National Grid". Ordnance Survey. • "Get-a-map". Ordnance Survey.)	Geo-coordinates	Notes	LB Number (Note: Historic Environment Scotland assign a unique alphanumeric identifier to each designated site in Scotland, for listed buildings this always begins with "LB", for example "LB12345".)	Image
4 And 6, Campbell Street				58°35′42″N 3°31′20″W	Category C(S)	41976	Upload Photo
14, 16, 18 Campbell Street				58°35′41″N 3°31′22″W	Category C(S)	41979	Upload Photo
Castle Street Former West Public Primary School				58°35′44″N 3°31′33″W	Category C(S)	41983	Upload Photo
24, Durness Street Allendale				58°35′47″N 3°31′21″W	Category B	41986	Upload Photo
High Street, Town Hall				58°35′44″N 3°31′05″W	Category B	41988	Upload another image
1, Janet Street				58°35′34″N 3°31′15″W	Category B	41989	Upload Photo
3, Janet Street House And Stables/Gighouse				58°35′34″N 3°31′18″W	Category B	41991	Upload Photo
6, Janet Street The Thurso Club				58°35′32″N 3°31′20″W	Category C(S)	41993	Upload Photo
43, 45 Olrig Street				58°35′47″N 3°31′28″W	Category C(S)	42007	Upload Photo
2, Princes Street And Court Yard Wall				58°35′41″N 3°31′16″W	Category C(S)	42013	Upload Photo
12, Princes Street				58°35′40″N 3°31′17″W	Category C(S)	42017	Upload Photo
16, 18, Shore Street				58°35′49″N 3°30′59″W	Category B	42025	Upload Photo
6, 8 Barrock Street Piers And Garden Walls				58°35′36″N 3°31′28″W	Category B	41962	Upload Photo
Aimster Farmhouse				58°32′54″N 3°31′02″W	Category B	14920	Upload Photo
Sordale Farm				58°32′14″N 3°27′59″W	Category B	14956	Upload Photo
20, Campbell Street				58°35′40″N 3°31′22″W	Category C(S)	41980	Upload Photo
Davidson's Lane Miller Institution				58°35′29″N 3°31′30″W	Category B	41984	Upload Photo
Granville Street, Pentland House And Garden Walls				58°35′47″N 3°31′39″W	Category B	41987	Upload Photo
8 Janet Street				58°35′29″N 3°31′23″W	Category B	41995	Upload Photo
20, Miller's Lane				58°35′45″N 3°30′55″W	Category B	42003	Upload Photo
Princes Street, Greenacres, House And Stable With Gighouse. (Former Free Church And Subsequently Church Of Scotland Manse)				58°35′29″N 3°31′43″W	Category C(S)	42012	Upload Photo
4, Princes Street				58°35′41″N 3°31′16″W	Category C(S)	42014	Upload Photo
30, Princes Street				58°35′37″N 3°31′23″W	Category B	42019	Upload another image
9, Rose Street ("Aldourie") And 11, Rose Street ("Bothangarrow")				58°35′41″N 3°31′28″W	Category C(S)	42023	Upload Photo
21, 23, 25, Rose Street (Right To Left)				58°35′39″N 3°31′31″W	Category C(S)	42024	Upload Photo
Sinclair Street Thurso West Church (Church Of Scotland) Church Room And Gate Piers				58°35′32″N 3°31′27″W	Category B	42027	Upload Photo
Sir George's Street, Episcopal Church Of St Peter And The Holy Rood				58°35′36″N 3°31′14″W	Category C(S)	42029	Upload another image
Sir John's Square Sir George Sinclair Memorial Fountain				58°35′38″N 3°31′22″W	Category C(S)	42030	Upload Photo
Sir John's Square, Sir John Sinclair Memorial				58°35′37″N 3°31′21″W	Category B	42032	Upload Photo
1, 3, 5, 7, 9 Traill Street				58°35′41″N 3°31′14″W	Category C(S)	42036	Upload Photo
11, Traill Street				58°35′40″N 3°31′15″W	Category B	42037	Upload Photo
13, Traill Street				58°35′40″N 3°31′16″W	Category B	42038	Upload Photo
37 Traill Street				58°35′38″N 3°31′19″W	Category C(S)	42042	Upload Photo
7 Wilson Lane				58°35′48″N 3°31′01″W	Category B	42045	Upload Photo
K6 Telephone Kiosk At Town Hall				58°35′44″N 3°31′06″W	Category B	42047	Upload Photo
10 Barrock Street				58°35′36″N 3°31′28″W	Category C(S)	41963	Upload Photo
Harold's Tower Mausoleum				58°36′09″N 3°29′22″W	Category B	14919	Upload Photo
Scrabster House				58°36′27″N 3°33′09″W	Category C(S)	14954	Upload Photo
Scrabster Ice House And Adjoining Cottage				58°36′46″N 3°32′51″W	Category C(S)	14955	Upload Photo
15, Campbell Street				58°35′40″N 3°31′24″W	Category B	41972	Upload Photo
17, Campbell Street				58°35′40″N 3°31′24″W	Category B	41973	Upload Photo
10, 12 Campbell Street				58°35′41″N 3°31′21″W	Category C(S)	41978	Upload Photo
2, Janet Street				58°35′34″N 3°31′16″W	Category B	41990	Upload Photo
22, 24, Manson's Lane The Brewer's House (22) And Old Brewery (24)				58°35′37″N 3°31′10″W	Category B	41998	Upload Photo
6, 7, Market Street				58°35′47″N 3°31′07″W	Category C(S)	42000	Upload Photo
Millbank Road, Former Thurso Mill				58°35′20″N 3°31′21″W	Category B	42001	Upload Photo
Shore Street, Kippering House With Kiln, Fish-House, Yard, Store And Shop				58°35′48″N 3°31′01″W	Category B	42026	Upload Photo
Thurso Railway Station				58°35′24″N 3°31′40″W	Category B	42035	Upload Photo
25, 27, 29, 31, 33, 35, Traill Street				58°35′39″N 3°31′17″W	Category B	42041	Upload Photo
18, Barrock Street				58°35′35″N 3°31′30″W	Category C(S)	41965	Upload Photo
7, Campbell Street				58°35′41″N 3°31′22″W	Category B	41968	Upload Photo
9, Campbell Street				58°35′41″N 3°31′23″W	Category B	41969	Upload Photo
Forss Water, Humpback Bridge				58°35′06″N 3°39′03″W	Category B	44721	Upload Photo
16, Olrig Street				58°35′43″N 3°31′19″W	Category C(S)	42008	Upload Photo
14, Princes Street				58°35′40″N 3°31′18″W	Category C(S)	42018	Upload Photo
23, Riverside Place				58°35′38″N 3°31′08″W	Category C(S)	42021	Upload Photo
24, Sinclair Street				58°35′32″N 3°31′25″W	Category C(S)	42028	Upload Photo
Thurso Bridge Over River Thurso				58°35′33″N 3°31′10″W	Category B	42033	Upload Photo
15 And 17 Traill Street, Clydesdale Bank				58°35′40″N 3°31′16″W	Category B	42039	Upload Photo
2, 4 Barrock Street				58°35′38″N 3°31′26″W	Category C(S)	41961	Upload Photo
11, Brabster Street				58°35′33″N 3°31′21″W	Category C(S)	41966	Upload Photo
Aimster Farm Dwellings				58°32′54″N 3°31′03″W	Category C(S)	14921	Upload Photo
Brims Castle				58°36′59″N 3°38′55″W	Category B	14922	Upload Photo
Forss Mill And Miller's House (East)				58°35′44″N 3°39′32″W	Category B	14925	Upload Photo
19, Campbell Street				58°35′40″N 3°31′25″W	Category B	41974	Upload Photo
Castle Street, Congregational Church				58°35′43″N 3°31′34″W	Category C(S)	41982	Upload Photo
9 And 10, Janet Street				58°35′29″N 3°31′24″W	Category B	41996	Upload Photo
Olrig Street Bank Of Scotland				58°35′44″N 3°31′19″W	Category B	42005	Upload Photo
6, Princes Street				58°35′41″N 3°31′16″W	Category C(S)	42015	Upload Photo
Wilson Lane, Old St Peter`S Church And Burial Ground				58°35′48″N 3°30′54″W	Category A	42044	Upload another image
8, Campbell Street				58°35′42″N 3°31′20″W	Category C(S)	41977	Upload Photo
50, Duncan Street				58°35′36″N 3°31′37″W	Category C(S)	41985	Upload Photo
4, Janet Street				58°35′32″N 3°31′18″W	Category B	41992	Upload Photo
7, Janet Street				58°35′30″N 3°31′22″W	Category B	41994	Upload Photo
Millbank, Foundry				58°35′21″N 3°31′20″W	Category C(S)	42002	Upload Photo
Olrig Street Former St Andrew's Church				58°35′45″N 3°31′20″W	Category B	42006	Upload another image
Pennyland House And Steading				58°35′52″N 3°32′02″W	Category B	42010	Upload Photo
Princes Street, St Peter's Parish Church (Church Of Scotland), Church Room, Enclosure Railings And Gate Piers				58°35′39″N 3°31′24″W	Category B	42011	Upload Photo
15, Riverside Place				58°35′39″N 3°31′07″W	Category C(S)	42020	Upload Photo
5, 7, Riverside Road The White House				58°35′47″N 3°30′53″W	Category C(S)	42022	Upload Photo
Sir John's Square War Memorial, 1914-18 And 1939-45				58°35′37″N 3°31′19″W	Category C(S)	42031	Upload Photo
8 Wilson Lane				58°35′48″N 3°31′00″W	Category C(S)	42046	Upload Photo
High Street, Thurso Heritage Museum (Former Carnegie Library)				58°35′44″N 3°31′06″W	Category B	49296	Upload Photo
13, Campbell Street				58°35′41″N 3°31′24″W	Category B	41971	Upload Photo
26, Campbell Street				58°35′39″N 3°31′23″W	Category C(S)	41981	Upload Photo
Manson's Lane The Meadow Well House				58°35′39″N 3°31′14″W	Category B	41997	Upload Photo
5, Market Street				58°35′47″N 3°31′08″W	Category B	41999	Upload Photo
21, Miller's Lane				58°35′45″N 3°30′55″W	Category C(S)	42004	Upload Photo
Olrig Street, Masonic Hall				58°35′45″N 3°31′30″W	Category C(S)	42009	Upload Photo
8, 10 Princes Street				58°35′41″N 3°31′17″W	Category C(S)	42016	Upload Photo
Thurso East The Lodge (Former Gate Lodge To Thurso East Castle) And Gateway				58°35′47″N 3°30′28″W	Category B	42034	Upload Photo
19, 21 And 23 Traill Street				58°35′39″N 3°31′17″W	Category C(S)	42040	Upload Photo
1, Campbell Street				58°35′43″N 3°31′20″W	Category C(S)	41967	Upload Photo
11, Campbell Street				58°35′41″N 3°31′23″W	Category B	41970	Upload Photo
Forss House				58°35′46″N 3°39′38″W	Category B	14923	Upload Photo
Forss Cottage				58°35′44″N 3°39′25″W	Category C(S)	14924	Upload Photo
Forss Bridge Of Forss Over Forss Water				58°35′43″N 3°39′29″W	Category B	14926	Upload Photo
Holborn Head Lighthouse And Attached Keeper's House				58°36′53″N 3°32′22″W	Category B	14952	Upload Photo
2, Campbell Street				58°35′42″N 3°31′19″W	Category C(S)	41975	Upload Photo
8, Wilson Street				58°35′43″N 3°31′02″W	Category C(S)	42043	Upload Photo
12 Barrock Street And Garden Walls				58°35′36″N 3°31′29″W	Category C(S)	41964	Upload Photo
Lythmore Farm Steading, Centre Range				58°34′31″N 3°37′44″W	Category B	14953	Upload Photo

== Key ==
The scheme for classifying buildings in Scotland is:

- Category A: "buildings of national or international importance, either architectural or historic; or fine, little-altered examples of some particular period, style or building type."
- Category B: "buildings of regional or more than local importance; or major examples of some particular period, style or building type, which may have been altered."
- Category C: "buildings of local importance; lesser examples of any period, style, or building type, as originally constructed or moderately altered; and simple traditional buildings which group well with other listed buildings."

In March 2016 there were 47,288 listed buildings in Scotland. Of these, 8% were Category A, and 50% were Category B, with the remaining 42% being Category C.

== See also ==
- List of listed buildings in Highland
