= Thurso Town Hall =

Municipal building in Thurso, Scotland

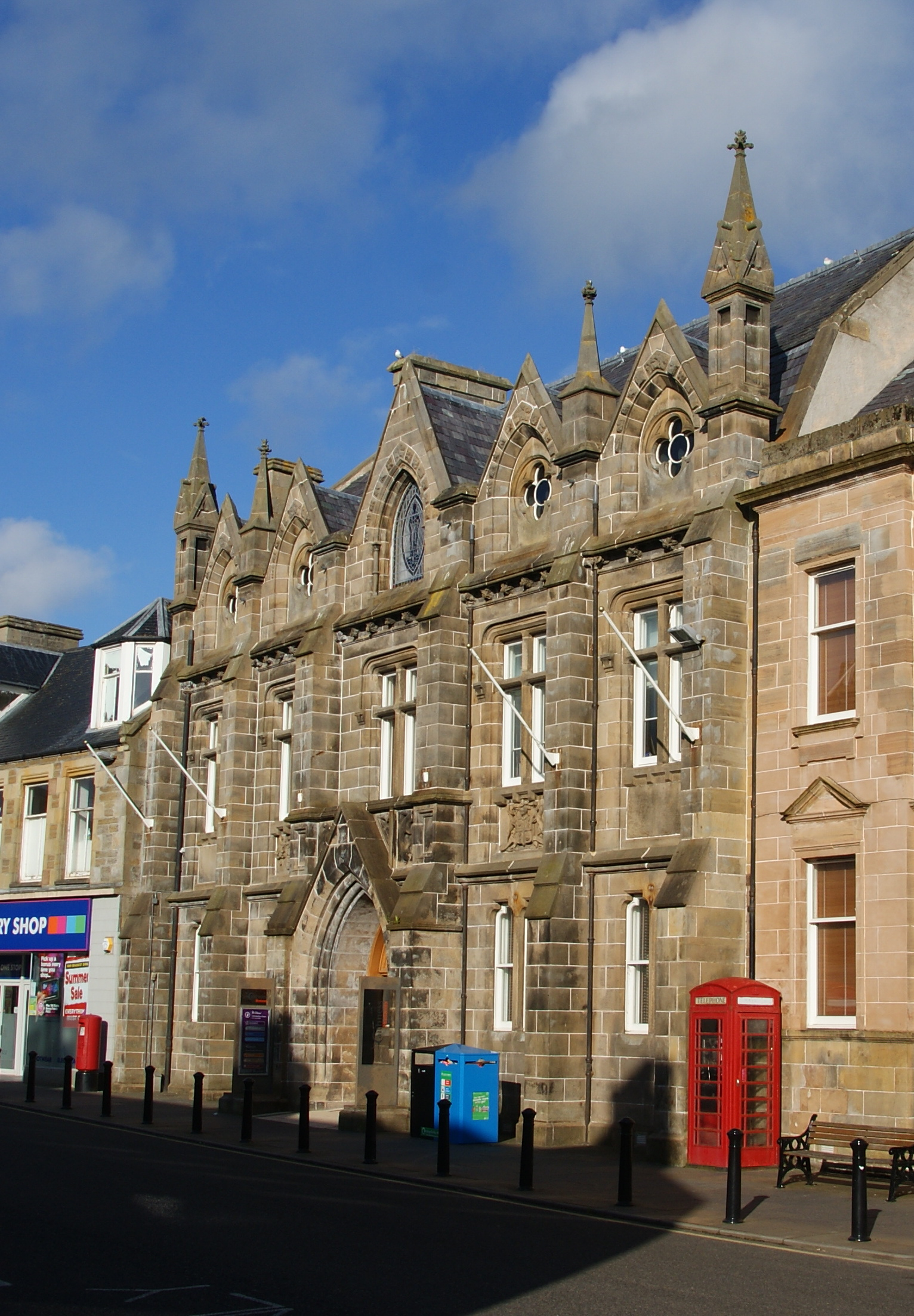
- Thurso Town Hall

- Shown in Highland
- 58.5956°N 3.5183°W
- Location: High Street, Thurso

History
- Built: 1871

Site notes
- Architect: John Russell Mackenzie
- Architectural style: Gothic Revival style

Listed Building – Category B
- Official name: Town Hall, High Street, Thurso
- Designated: 28 November 1984
- Reference no.: LB41988

Thurso Town Hall is a municipal structure in the High Street, Thurso, in the Highland area of Scotland. The structure, which is used as a museum, is a Category B listed building.

== History ==
The building was financed by a local landowner, Alexander Henderson, who left £1,000 in his will towards the cost of a new burgh hall. The foundation stone for the new building was laid in 1868: it was designed by John Russell Mackenzie in the Gothic Revival style, built in ashlar stone at a cost of £2,500 and was officially opened on 14 January 1871.

The design involved a symmetrical main frontage with five bays facing the High Street. The central bay featured an arched doorway with a fanlight; on the first floor, there was a mullioned and transomed window which was surmounted by a gable containing a stained glass window depicting Saint Peter. The other bays were fenestrated on the ground floor by bipartite windows; on the first floor there were mullioned and transomed windows which were surmounted by gables containing quatrefoils. All the bays were flanked by buttresses which were surmounted by pinnacles and there were panels carved with coats of arms on either side of the central bay just below the first floor windows. Internally, the principal room was a large assembly hall with capacity to accommodate 450 people seated. A Carnegie library, which was designed by Sinclair MacDonald in the neoclassical style, was erected just to the south of the town hall in 1910.

Following the completion of the Dounreay Nuclear Power Development Establishment in 1954, the Board Member for Engineering and Production at the UK Atomic Energy Authority, Sir Christopher Hinton, used the town hall to give a lecture, which extolled the peaceful uses of atomic energy, in January 1955. Other visitors included the Queen Elizabeth II, accompanied by the Duke of Edinburgh, who arrived at the town hall in June 1964. The town hall continued to serve as the headquarters of the burgh council for much of the 20th century but ceased to be local seat of government after the enlarged Caithness District Council was formed in 1975. A public inquiry was held in the town hall, to consider government proposals to build a European Demonstration Fast Nuclear Reprocessing Plant at Dounreay, in 1986. After the library service relocated from the Carnegie library building to the old Miller Academy building in Davidson's Lane, the Carnegie library building was then converted for use as the "Thurso Heritage Museum".

Following the decommissioning of Dounreay, the UK Atomic Energy Authority financed the relocation of the artefacts of the Dounreay Visitor Centre to the town hall. In order to accommodate this, an expanded museum complex, comprising the Carnegie library building and the town hall, was established at a cost of £3.5 million, and was officially re-opened by Duke of Rothesay as "Caithness Horizons" on 3 August 2009. Artefacts placed on display in the expanded museum included the control room from Dounreay Nuclear Power Station, a botanical collection assembled by the naturalist, Robert Dick, and a collection of Pictish stones. After a further refurbishment and a change of management, the museum was rebranded as the "North Coast Visitor Centre" and re-opened again in November 2021.

== See also ==
- List of listed buildings in Thurso, Highland
