= Thurso High School =

Coordinates: 58.58726°N 3.53234°W

Location
- Ormlie Road; Thurso, KW14 7DS; Scotland

Information
- Type: Secondary
- Established: 1958
- School district: Caithness
- Local authority: Highland
- Head teacher: H Flavell
- Gender: Mixed
- Age: 11 to 18
- Enrolment: 774 (Jan 2016)
- Houses: Pentland, Olrig, Dirlot, Brims, Forss
- Colours: Red and black
- Website: thursohighschool.org.uk

Thurso High School in Thurso, Caithness, Scotland, is the most northerly secondary school on mainland Great Britain.

The Highland Council employs about 75 staff at the school. The rector is Mrs H Flavell. The school has just under 800 students. It consists of two main buildings and three huts.

== History ==
In 1954 Basil Spence & Partners, along with Caithness County Architect Sandy Giavanni, were commissioned by the Thurso County Council to build a new high school. A large green-field site was chosen on the east side of County Road (now designated as Ormlie Road), to the south of the town. Officially opened in October 1958, Thurso High School is the most northerly secondary school on mainland Great Britain. The main campus is made up of a number of informally grouped buildings of varying heights surrounding a central courtyard.

Each building is given individual surface treatment and a variety of contrasting materials have been used including Caithness stone, polished stone, timber boarding, and concrete slabs. The building featured a carved granite abstract 'Education' by Ann Henderson RSA, who was born in Thurso and studied and taught at Edinburgh College of Art.

The school was commissioned in two phases, the first completed in October 1958 and the second begun in May 1959. The reason for the extension to the school was the growth in Thurso and the surrounding area's population after the development of the Dounreay nuclear power station. Although the school was built in anticipation of a population increase, the growth was greater and more rapid than expected, and at its peak Dounreay's staff of 2,400 people trebled the size of the town.

In October 2022, part of the school was closed off following potential concerns about part of the building's concrete frame, following an inspection by engineers of a three-storey 1960s-era extension block.
