= River Thurso =

River in northern Scotland

Coordinates: 58°36′N 3°30′W

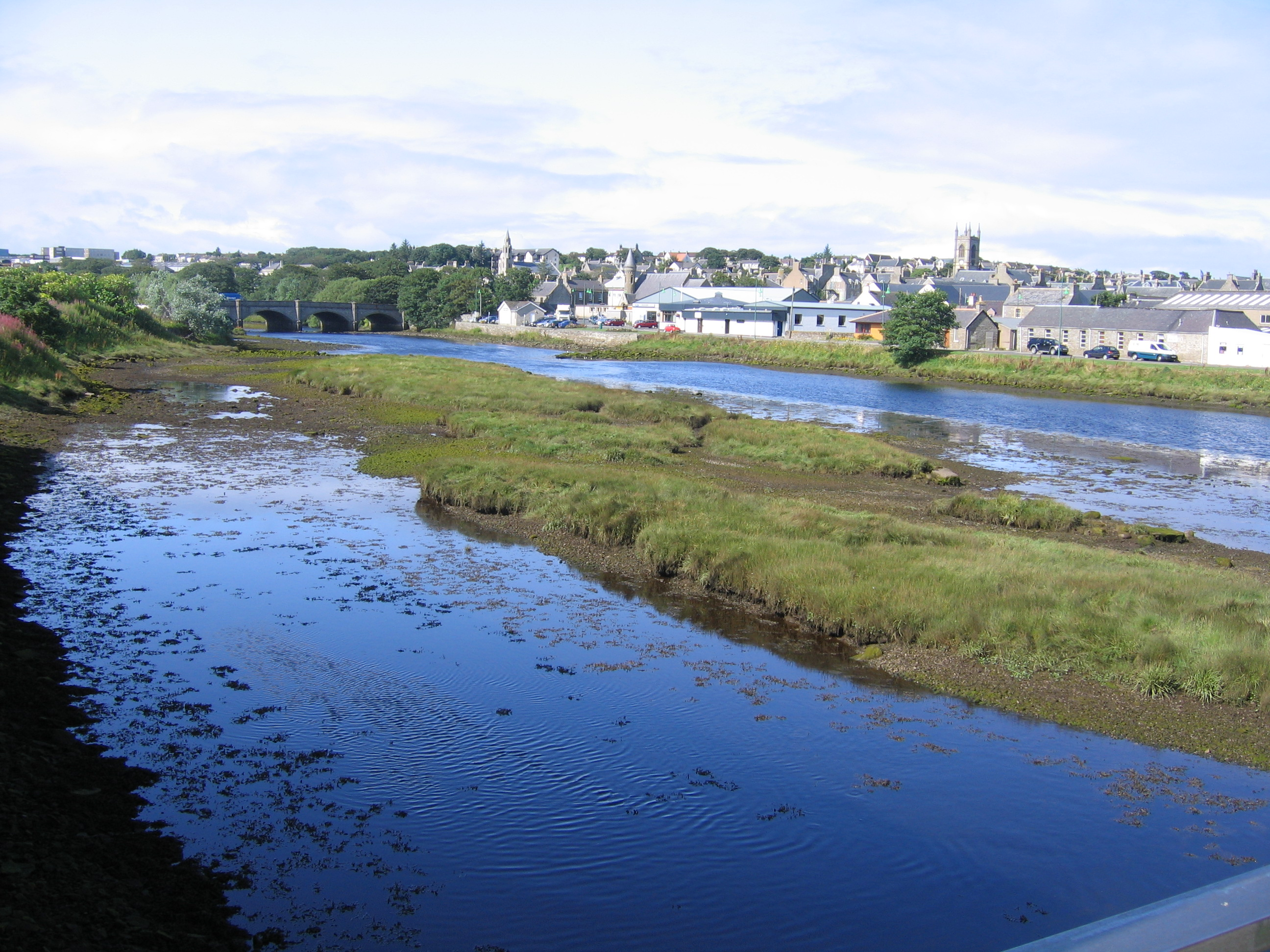
River Thurso at Thurso

The River Thurso (Scottish Gaelic: Abhainn Theòrsa) has Loch Rumsdale in Caithness as its source, about 26 kilometres (16 mi) south and 14 kilometres (8.7 mi) west of the burgh of Thurso, Caithness, and about 2 kilometres (1.2 mi) south of the railway line linking the burghs of Thurso and Wick with Inverness. At its source and until it reaches Loch More the river is known also as Strathmore Water. Caithness is in the Highland area of Scotland.

From Loch Rumsdale the river flows generally east/southeast across about 4 kilometres (2.5 mi) until it is joined by Glutt Water, and then generally northeast across about 7 kilometres until it enters the southern end of Loch More. On the loch's eastern side, towards its northern end, the river flows almost immediately into the western end of Loch Beg. Then from Loch Beg's eastern end the river flows east/northeast across about 6 kilometres (3.7 mi) until it is joined by Little River.

From Little River the River Thurso flows generally northward across about 19 kilometres (12 mi) until it reaches its mouth in Thurso Bay and the Atlantic Ocean. On its way it passes through the village of Halkirk, about 9 kilometres south of the burgh of Thurso, and through the burgh itself, which fronts the bay. Whilts there is a small harbour at the river mouth, the main port is now at Scrabster, just to the west.

The river is bridged twice by railways, three times each by highways and footways.

About 4 kilometres (2.5 mi) south of Thurso burgh the river is bridged by the rail link between the burghs of Wick and Thurso. About 6 kilometres (3.7 mi) further south it is bridged by the rail link connecting both burghs with Inverness.

The highways cross the river in the burgh of Thurso, in Halkirk, and at Westerdale, which is about 16 kilometres (9.9 mi) south of the burgh.

The three footway crossings were within the burgh of Thurso. The river is designated as a Special Area of Conservation (SAC) due to its "higher proportion of multi sea-winter salmon Salmo salar than is found in many rivers further south in the species’ range." Part of the River Thurso is designated a Site of Special Scientific Interest (SSSI) due to the flood-plain fen and flowering plants found there. Part of the River Thurso SSSI overlaps with the River Thurso SAC.
