= St Peter's and St Andrew's Church, Thurso =

Church in Thurso, Scotland

Coordinates: 58.594°N 3.52327°W

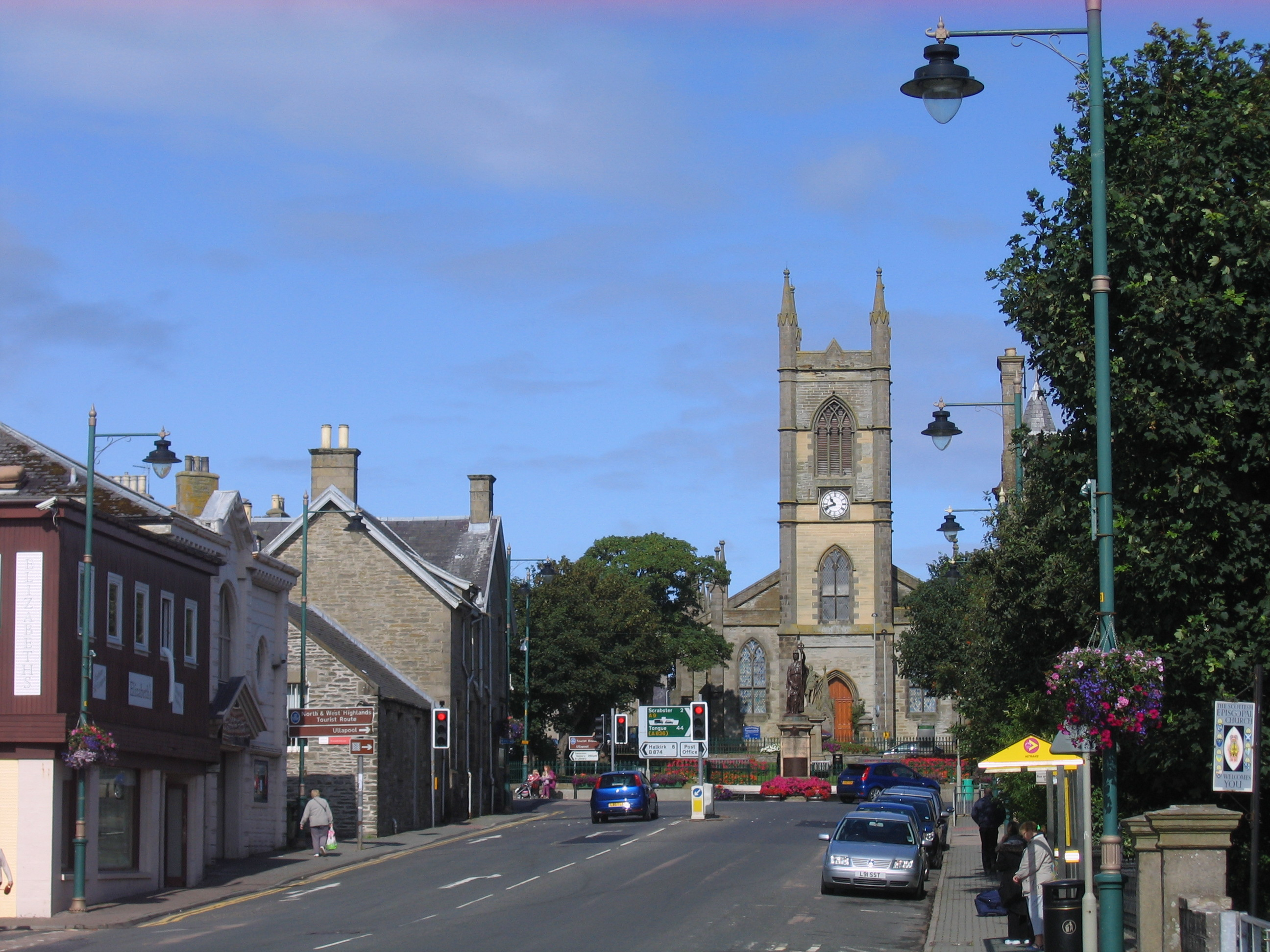
St Peter's and St Andrew's Church

St Peter's and St Andrew's Church is located on Princes Street in Thurso, Caithness, Scotland. The church was built to a design of William Burn in 1830–2, a simplified version of the Church of St John the Evangelist, Edinburgh, which is also attributed to Burn.
