= Thurso =

Town on the north coast of Scotland

Coordinates: 58.596°N 3.521°W

Thurso: Scottish Gaelic: Inbhir Theòrsa; Scots: Thursa
- Town
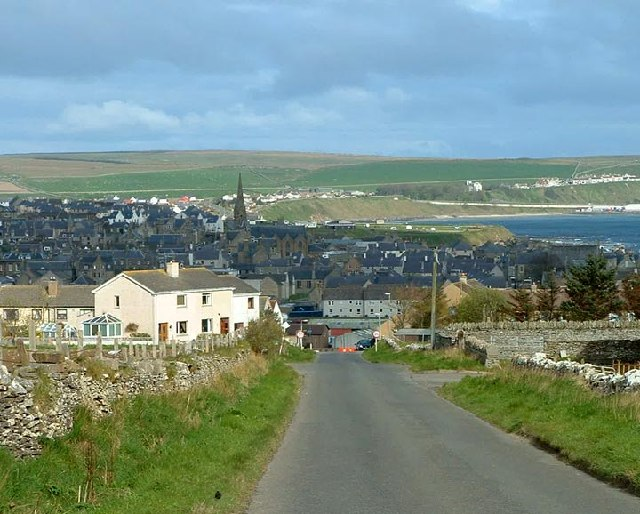
- Thurso viewed from Mountpleasant

- Location within the Caithness area
- Population: 7,426 (2022)
- OS grid reference: ND115685
  - Edinburgh: 183 mi (295 km)
  - London: 508 mi (818 km)
- Council area: Highland
- Lieutenancy area: Caithness
- Country: Scotland
- Sovereign state: United Kingdom
- Post town: Thurso
- Postcode district: KW14
- Dialling code: 01847
- Police: Scotland
- Fire: Scottish
- Ambulance: Scottish
- UK Parliament: Caithness, Sutherland and Easter Ross
- Scottish Parliament: Caithness, Sutherland and Ross

Thurso (pronounced /ˈθɜːrzoʊ/; Scots: Thursa, Scottish Gaelic: Inbhir Theòrsa [ˈiɲɪɾʲ ˈhjɔːrˠs̪ə]) is a town and former burgh on the north coast of the Highland council area of Scotland. Situated in the historical County of Caithness, it is the northernmost town on the island of Great Britain. From a latitudinal standpoint, Thurso is located more than 500 miles (800 km) north of London and further north than the southernmost point of Norway.

It lies at the junction of the north–south A9 road and the west–east A836 road, connected to Bridge of Forss in the west and Castletown in the east. The 34-mile (55 km) River Thurso flows through the town and into Thurso Bay and the Pentland Firth. The river estuary serves as a small harbour. At the 2022 Census, Thurso had a population of 7,426. The population of the larger Thurso civil parish including the town and the surrounding countryside was estimated to be 12,057 in 2021.

Thurso functioned as an important Norse port, and later traded with ports throughout northern Europe until the 19th century. A thriving fishing centre, Thurso also had a reputation for its linen-cloth and tanning activities. As of 2015, the Dounreay Nuclear Research Establishment, although mostly decommissioned at the end of the 20th century, employs a significant number of the local population. The Category-A listed ruined Old St Peter's Church (St. Peter's Kirk) is one of the oldest churches in Scotland, dating to at least 1125. The current church, St Andrew's and St Peter's, was built in 1832 to a design by William Burn in the Gothic style.

The town contains the main campus of North Highland College and Thurso High School, the northernmost secondary school on the British mainland, which was established in 1958. Thurso Castle, built in 1872, is in ruins. Thurso is home to the football team Thurso FC, established in 1998, who play in the North Caledonian League, and the rugby teams Caithness Crushers and Caithness RFC.

Thurso railway station, opened in 1874, is the most northern station in the United Kingdom. The nearby port of Scrabster provides ferry services to the Orkney Islands; the NorthLink ferry (MV Hamnavoe) operates between Scrabster and Stromness.

== Etymology ==
Originally Thurso was known by the Celtic name of tarvodubron meaning "bull water" or "bull river"; similarly Dunnet Head was tarvedunum standing for "bull fort" and the name of the town name may have its roots there. Norse influence translated its name to Thjorsá, then altered it to Thorsá, based on the deity of Thor and translating as (the place on) Thor's River.

The local Scots name, Thursa, derives from the Norse, as does the modern Scottish Gaelic Inbhir Theòrsa. Inbhir means a river mouth, and is generally found as Inver in many anglicised names.

== History ==
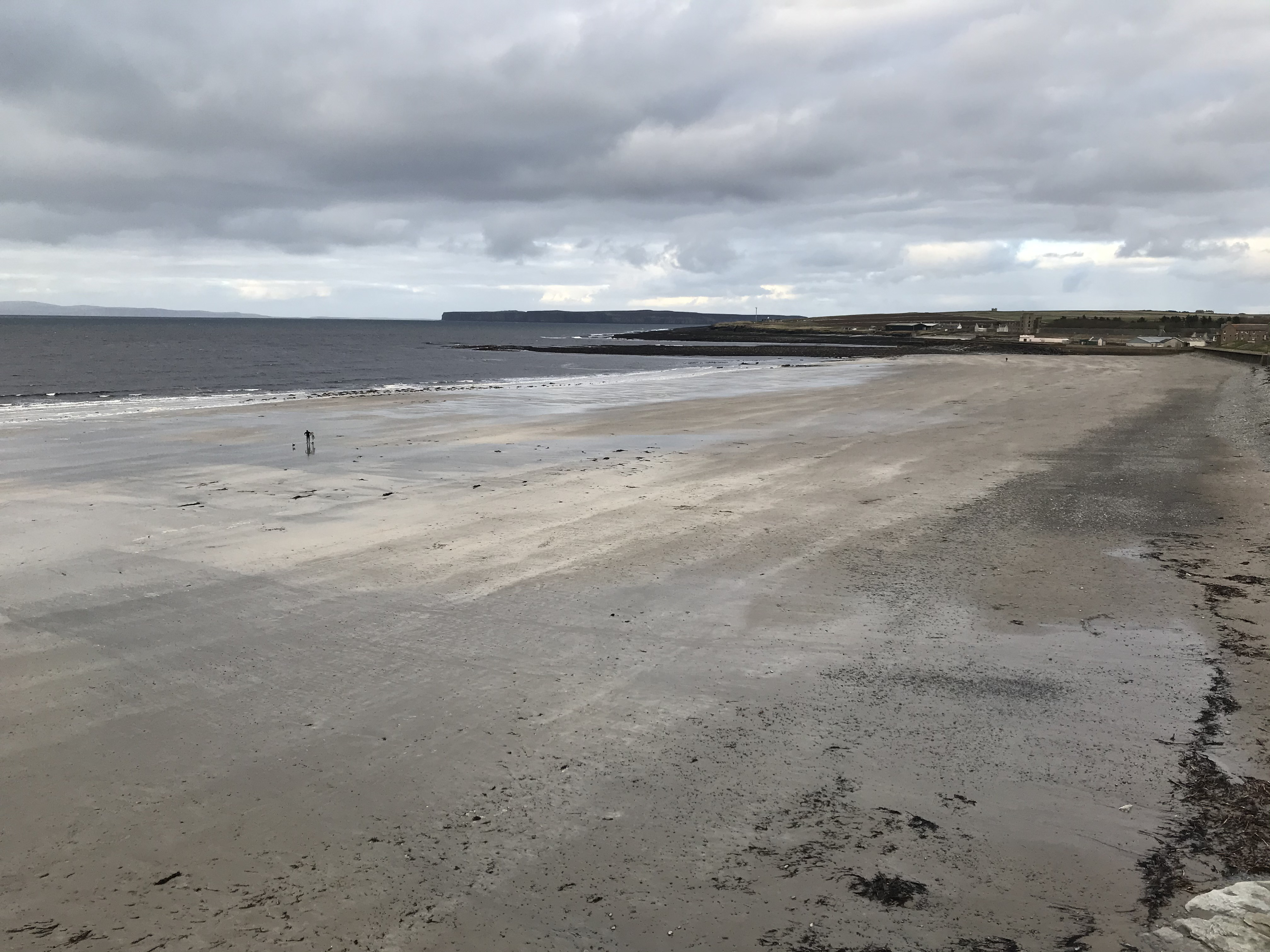
Low tide in Thurso

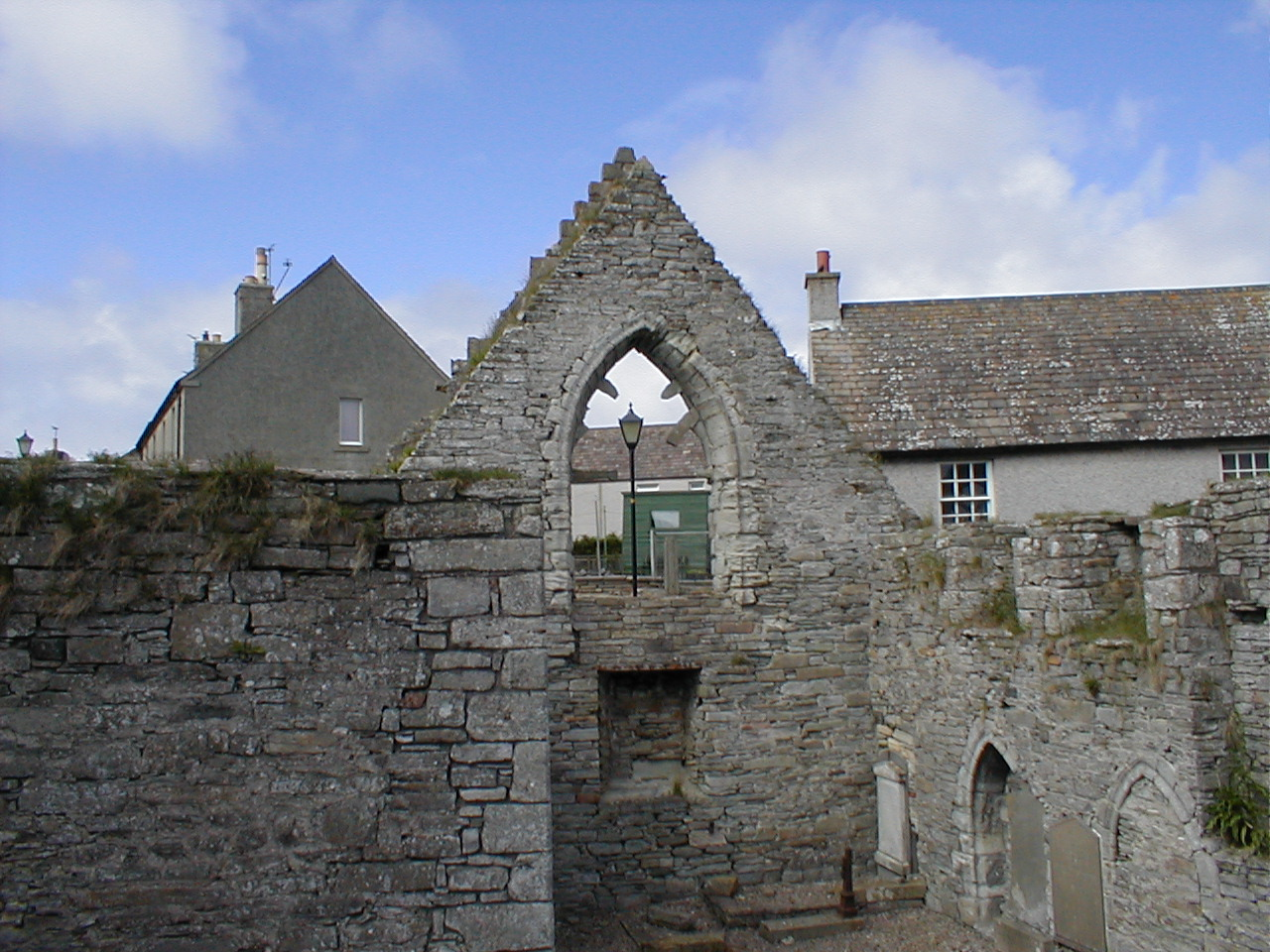
St. Peter's Kirk, Thurso

Thurso's history stretches back to at least the era of Norse Orcadian rule in Caithness, which ended conclusively in 1266. Neolithic horned cairns found on nearby Shebster Hill, which were used for burials and rituals, date back about 5,000 years. The town was an important Norse port, and has a later history of trade with ports throughout northern Europe until the 19th century. In 1330 Scotland's standard unit of weight was brought in line with that of Thurso at the decree of King David II of Scotland, a measure of the town's economic importance. Old St Peter's Kirk is said to date from circa 1220 and the time of Caithness Bishop Gilbert Murray, who died in 1245.

In 1649, Gaels from Ireland, led by Donald Macalister Mullach, attacked Thurso and were chased off by the residents, headed by Sir James Sinclair. One of the locals, a servant of Sinclair was said to have killed Mullach by "cutting a button from his master's coat and firing it from a musket". In 1811, the parish had 592 houses with a population of 3,462. This had decreased to 2,510 people by 1841. Following the passage into law of the 1845 Poor Law Act, a combination poorhouse was constructed; work commenced in 1854 and was completed by 1856. The building, which had a capacity to house 149 inmates, was on a 5-acre (2 ha) site to the west of Thurso Road and provided poor relief for Thurso and the parishes of Bower, Canisbay, Dunnet, Halkirk, Olrig, Reay and Watten. Many of the poorhouses in Scotland were under used, and by 1924 the building had been unoccupied for several years so was sold; it was later utilised as housing but by 2001 was again abandoned.

Much of the town is a planned 19th-century development. In 1906, a new Royal National Lifeboat Institution boathouse and slipway was inaugurated near Scrabster Harbour. A fire on 10 December 1956 destroyed the building and its 47ft Watson-class lifeboat and a new building and boat was built, launched the following year. A new lifeboat, named "The Three Sisters" was inaugurated in 1971 by the Queen Mother. A major expansion occurred in the mid-20th century when the Dounreay nuclear power plant was established at Dounreay in 1955, 9 miles (14 km) to the west of the town. The arrival of workers related to the power station caused a three-fold increase in the population of Thurso; the 1951 census gave a figure of 3,000 but this had swelled to 9,000 by 1971. This led to around 1,700 new houses being built in Thurso and nearby Castletown, a mixture of local authority housing blended with private houses and flats built by the United Kingdom Atomic Energy Authority. Decommissioned at the end of the 20th century, it is estimated the site will not be cleared of all the waste until the 2070s, so will continue to provide employment.

Thurso is also the name of the viscountcy held by the Sinclair family in the Peerage of the United Kingdom. Thurso hosted the National Mòd in 2010, which was the first time this festival of Gaelic language and culture had been held so far north.

=== Governance ===
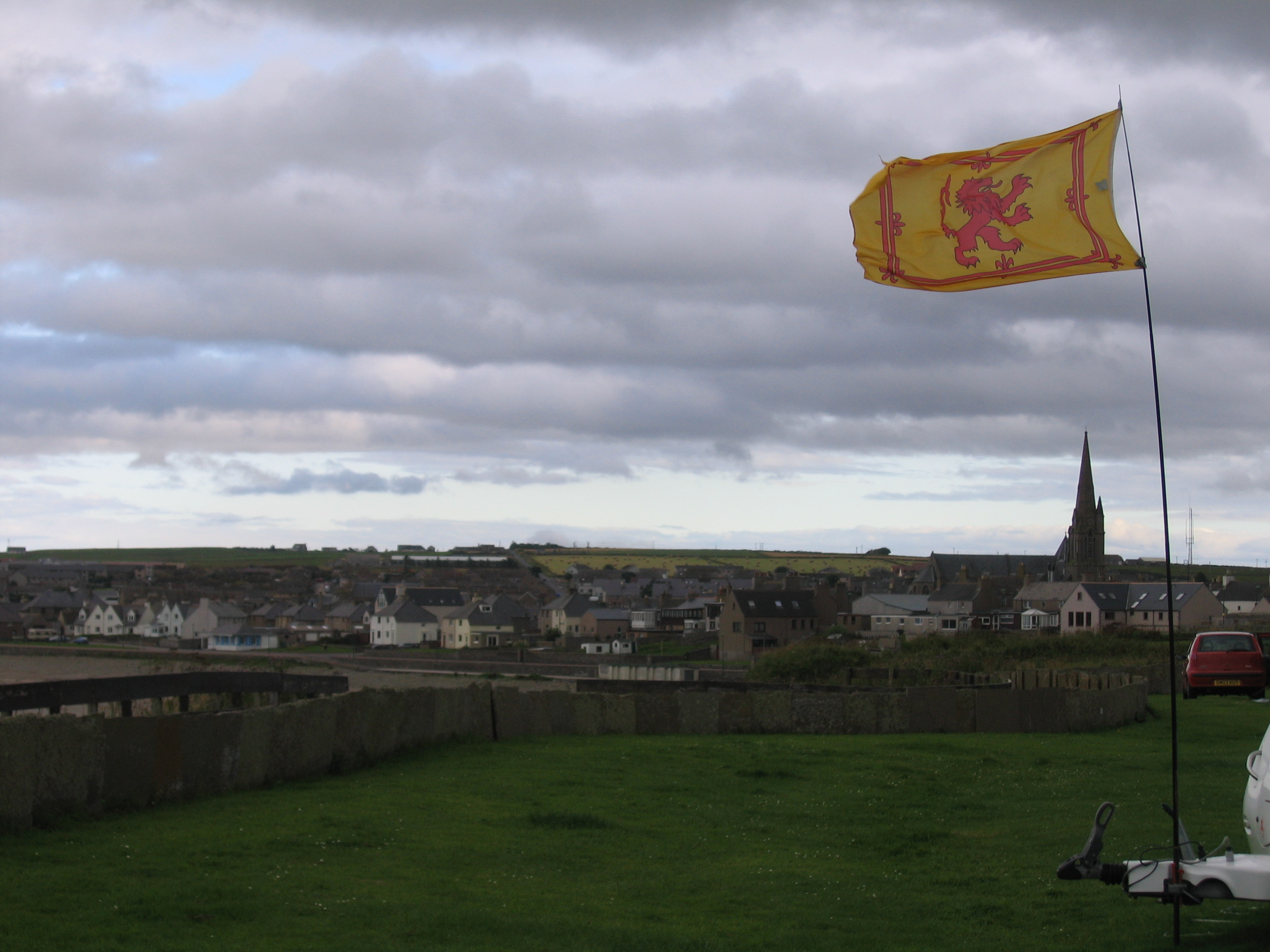
View of Thurso from the north

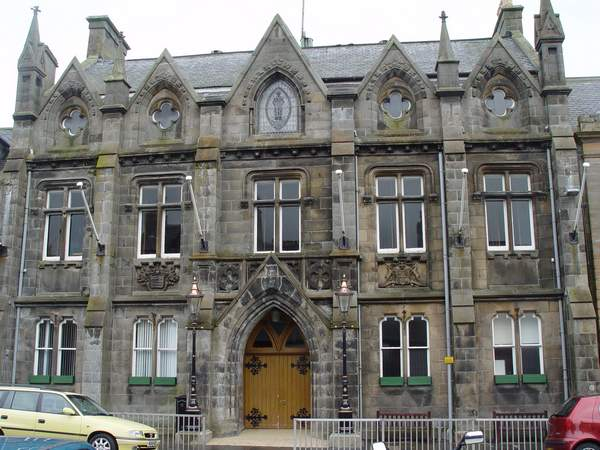
Thurso Town Hall

Thurso has history as a burgh of barony dating from 1633 when it was established by Charles I. From 1870, the burgh council was based at Thurso Town Hall. In 1975, under the Local Government (Scotland) Act 1973, the local government burgh was merged into the Caithness district of the two-tier Highland region. In 1996, under the Local Government etc. (Scotland) Act 1994, the district was abolished and the region became a unitary council area. From 1996 until 2007, the town of Thurso was covered by two or three wards, each electing one councillor by the first-past-the-post system of election. In 2007, a single Thurso ward was created to elect three councillors by the single transferable vote system. In 2017 the Thurso ward was absorbed into a new multi member ward along with the Western portion of Landward Caithness, the new ward, named Thurso and Northwest Caithness, was contested for the first time in the Highland Council election of 2017. The incumbent councillors are Cllr Matthew Reiss (Independent), Provost Struan Mackie (Scottish Conservative), Cllr Ron Gunn (Scottish Liberal Democrats) and Cllr Karl Rosie (Scottish National Party).

Electing four members to the new ward, it is one of two within the Highland Council's Caithness ward management area and one of seven within the council's Caithness, Sutherland and Easter Ross corporate management area.

Thurso Community Council was created in 1975 when the burgh was abolished. The community council is not a tier of local government, but it is recognised as a level of statutory representation. The community council represents an area which is somewhat smaller than that represented by ward councillors. The ward area also includes parts of other community council areas.

== Geography ==
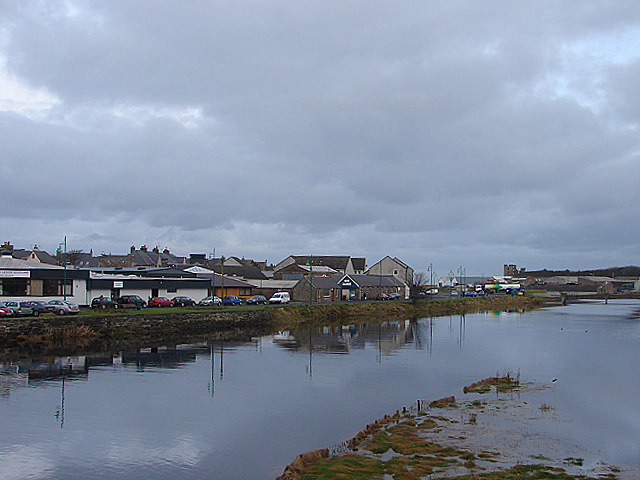
Thurso from the river

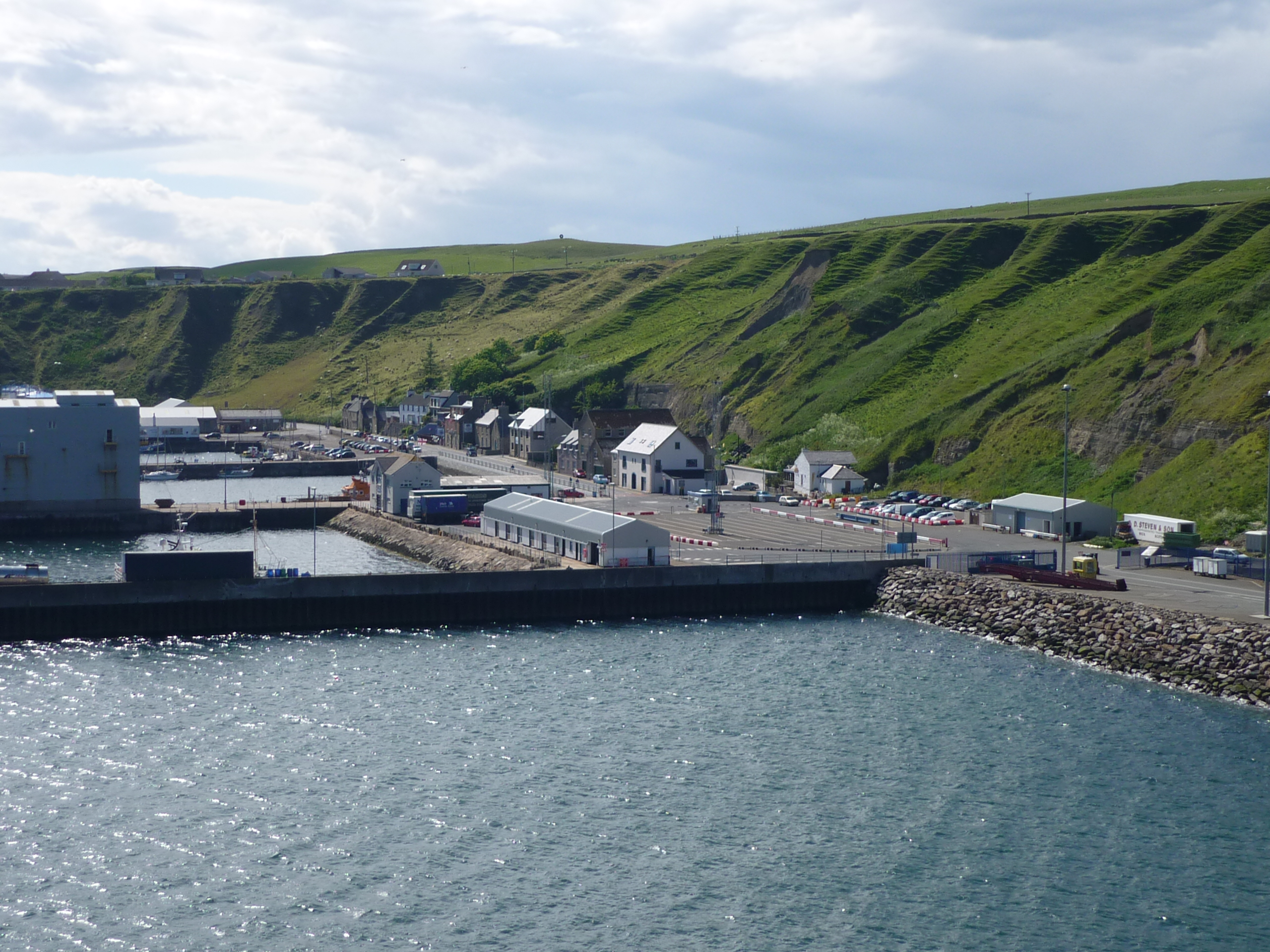
Scrabster Harbour

Thurso is the most northerly town on the British mainland, situated on the northern coastline overlooking the Orkney Islands. It is situated at the northern terminus of the A9 road, the main road linking Caithness with the south of Scotland, and is 19.5 miles (31.4 km) west of John o' Groats and 20.4 miles (32.8 km) northwest of Wick, the closest town. Thurso railway station is the most northerly location served by Britain's rail network, which links the town directly with Wick, the county town of Caithness, and with Inverness. Thurso is bordered by the parishes of Olrig and Bower to the east, Halkirk to the south, and Reay to the west, and stretches from Holborn Head and Crosskirk Bay in the west to Dunnet Head and Dunnet Bay in the east. It lies slightly further north than the Alaskan capital of Juneau, and slightly further south than the Swedish capital of Stockholm.

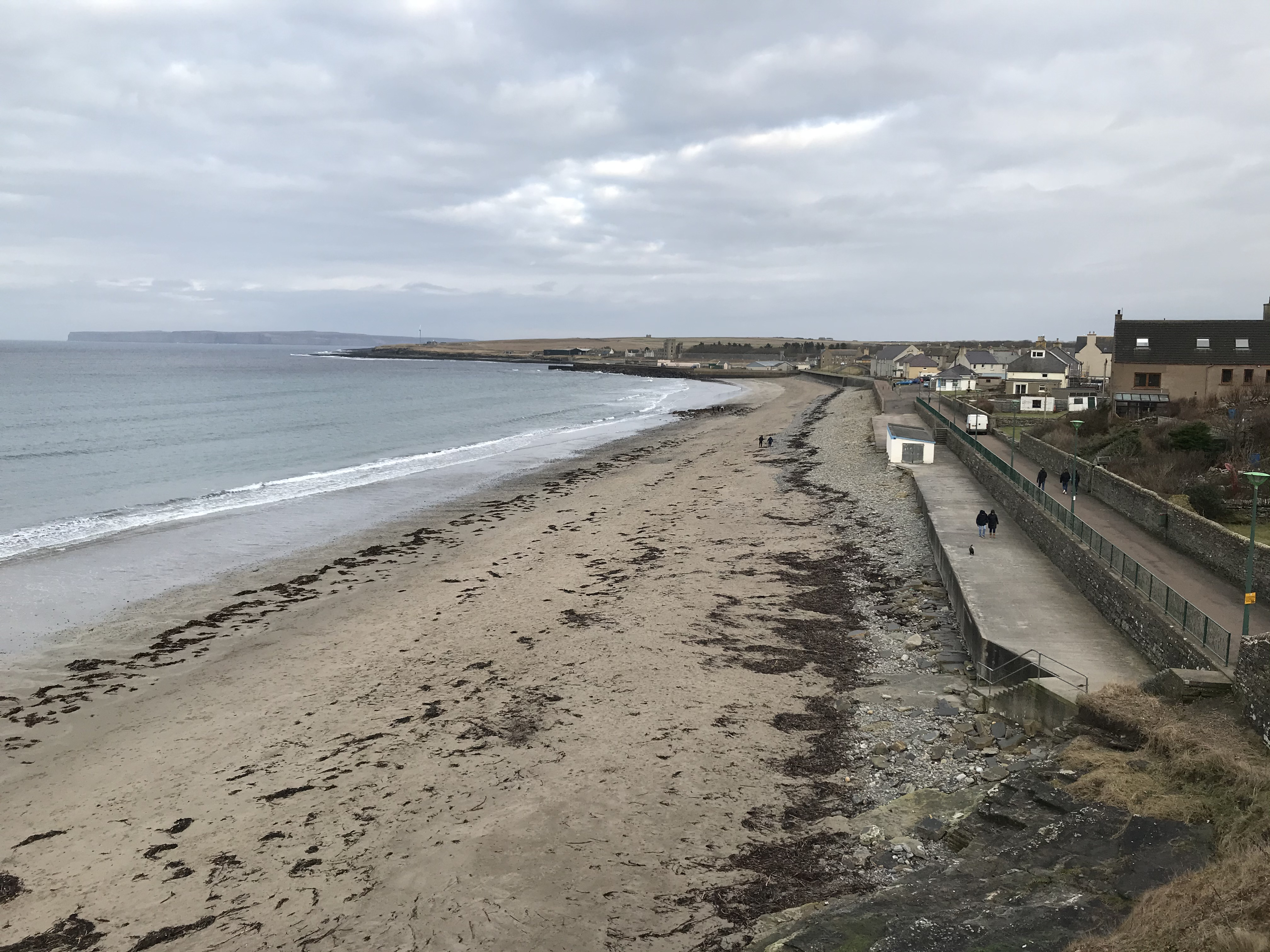
Thurso Beach

The 34-mile (55 km) River Thurso, reputable for its salmon fishing, flows through the town and into Thurso Bay and the Pentland Firth. The river estuary serves as a small harbour. Thurso has a fine harbour and beach and looks out over the Pentland Firth to the Orkney island of Hoy and the towering Old Man of Hoy (a stack of rock standing out from the main island).

=== Climate ===
Thurso has a cool oceanic climate (Köppen Cfb), featuring similar weather to the Scottish Highlands. The highest temperature recorded was 25 °C or 77 °F (July 1995) and the lowest −11 °C or 12.2 °F (December 2010). Although Thurso is mild enough to permit the growth of trees, the windswept surroundings mostly consist of grasslands resembling the offshore northern archipelagoes of Orkney and Shetland. The sea remains chilly also in summer and offshore sea surface temperatures do not fluctuate much throughout the year.

Climate data for Thurso, Scotland
Month	Jan	Feb	Mar	Apr	May	Jun	Jul	Aug	Sep	Oct	Nov	Dec	Year
Record high °C (°F)	14.1 (57.4)	14.4 (57.9)	17.8 (64.0)	19.8 (67.6)	22.8 (73.0)	24.3 (75.7)	25.0 (77.0)	24.9 (76.8)	23.0 (73.4)	19.9 (67.8)	16.2 (61.2)	13.8 (56.8)	25.0 (77.0)
Mean daily maximum °C (°F)	6.2 (43.2)	6.6 (43.9)	8.0 (46.4)	10.2 (50.4)	12.7 (54.9)	14.6 (58.3)	16.6 (61.9)	16.6 (61.9)	14.6 (58.3)	11.6 (52.9)	8.5 (47.3)	6.6 (43.9)	11.1 (52.0)
Mean daily minimum °C (°F)	0.8 (33.4)	0.8 (33.4)	1.7 (35.1)	3.2 (37.8)	5.2 (41.4)	8.1 (46.6)	10.1 (50.2)	10.2 (50.4)	8.2 (46.8)	5.8 (42.4)	3.2 (37.8)	1.1 (34.0)	4.9 (40.8)
Record low °C (°F)	−10.6 (12.9)	−10.0 (14.0)	−7.8 (18.0)	−5.3 (22.5)	−2.6 (27.3)	−0.9 (30.4)	1.2 (34.2)	0.6 (33.1)	−3.4 (25.9)	−6.2 (20.8)	−8.8 (16.2)	−11.0 (12.2)	−11.0 (12.2)
Average precipitation mm (inches)	100.4 (3.95)	79.4 (3.13)	82.3 (3.24)	58.0 (2.28)	55.3 (2.18)	63.7 (2.51)	70.5 (2.78)	76.3 (3.00)	96.8 (3.81)	104.0 (4.09)	115.5 (4.55)	110.4 (4.35)	1,002.4 (39.46)
Mean monthly sunshine hours	36.6	67.9	96.4	145.3	196.3	157.3	140.9	135.2	114.1	76.2	45.7	28.7	1,240.5

== Economy ==
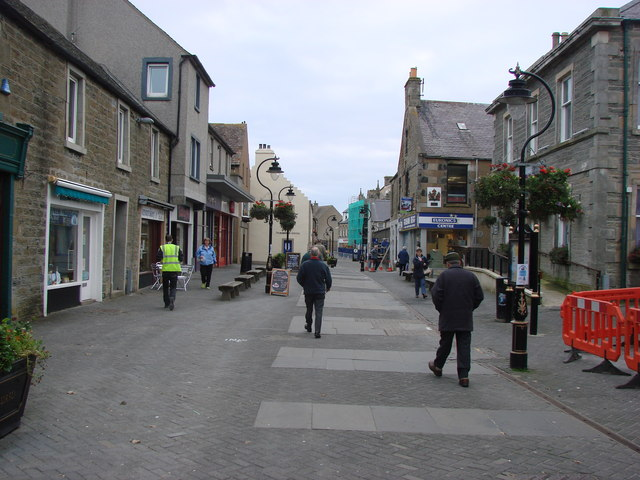
Rotterdam Street, Thurso

Historically, Thurso was known for its production of linen cloth and had a thriving tanning business. Fishing has always been of major significance in the running of the local economy, and the Thurso Shipowner's Association oversaw much of the shipping activity. The port of Scrabster lies about 1 1/2 miles (2.4 km) to the west of the estuary of the River Thurso, and plays a significant role in the white fish industry in Scotland. Scrabster has deep water in the shelter of Holborn Head. The harbour includes a berth for the MV Hamnavoe, a roll-on/roll-off ferry operated by Northlink linking the Scottish mainland with Stromness on Orkney. There is also a large fishmart and the local lifeboat is stationed there too. From June 2007, a summer-only weekly ferry service operated by the Faroese company Smyril Line reopened, connecting Scrabster with the Faroe Islands, Iceland and Norway, but has now been discontinued.

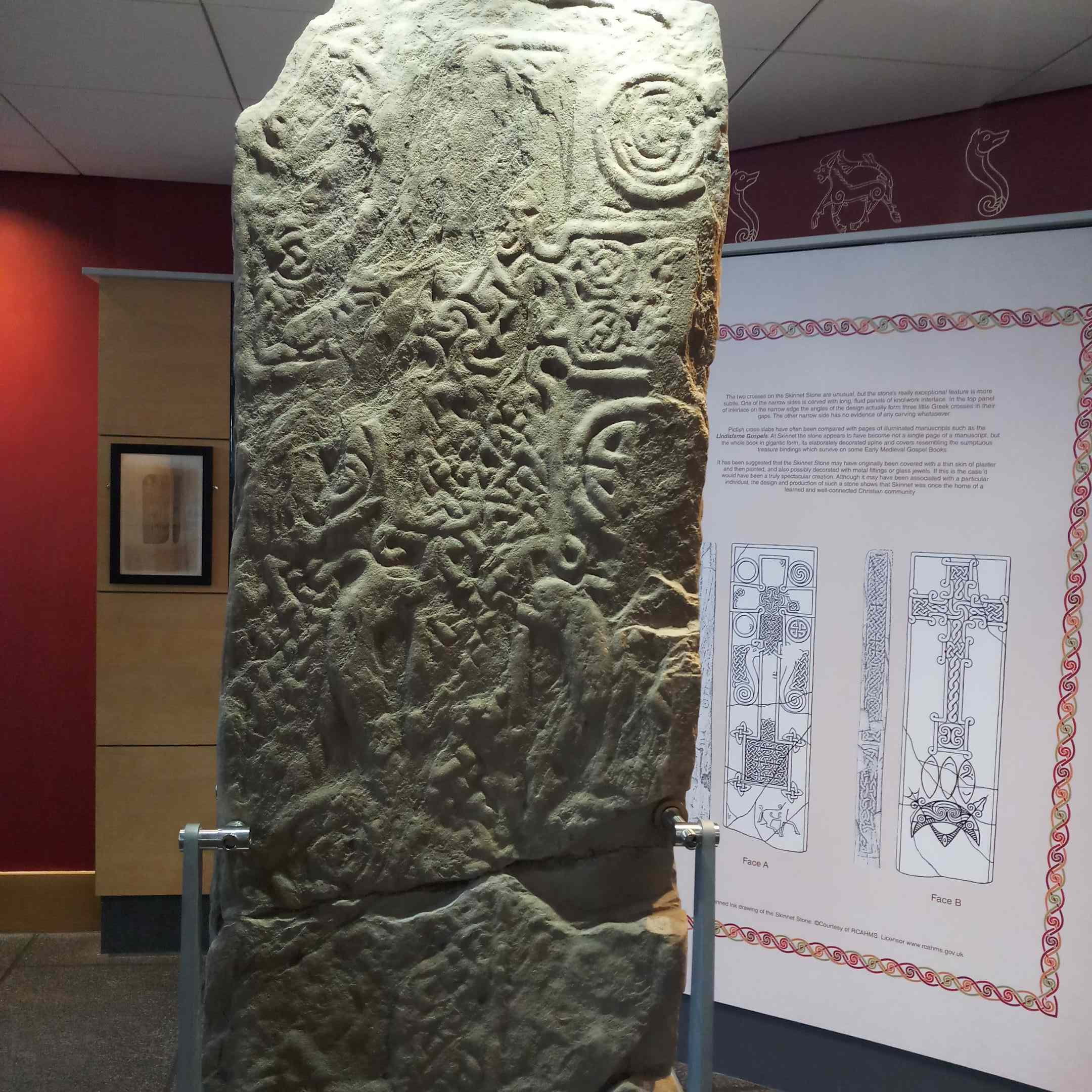
Inside North Coast Visitor Centre, Thurso

Thurso has a small museum, North Coast Visitor Centre, several hotels and bars, a surf shop/cafe stocking famous brands, and a small skatepark. There is also a sizeable British Telecom call centre and a plant making lithium-ion batteries for the MoD on the west side of the town, which along with the Dounreay Nuclear power plant, provide a high level of employment in Caithness. On 12 January 2010, approval was granted for the Baillie wind farm near Thurso which will feature 21 turbines and supply 52.5 MW, enough for 25,000 homes.

== Landmarks ==
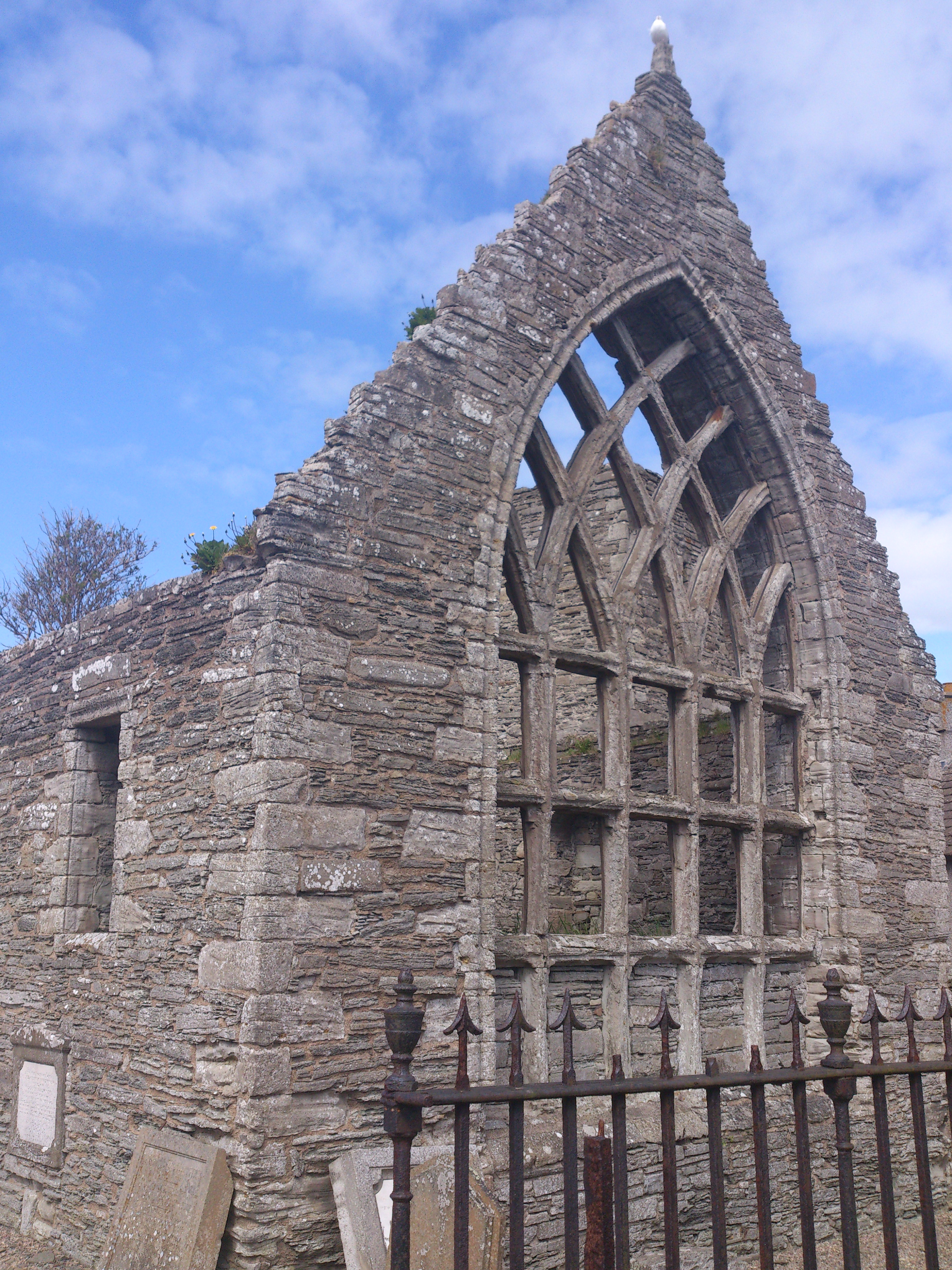
Old St Peter's Church (St. Peter's Kirk)

The Category A listed ruined Old St Peter's Church (St. Peter's Kirk) is one of the older churches in Scotland, dated to at least 1125, and at one time it was the principal church for the county, administered by the Bishops of Caithness. The church held hearings against criminal activity and determined how those caught should be punished. In 1701, a woman who had a relationship with a Dutch sailor had her head shaved and was publicly shamed, paraded through the town by the local hangman.

The current church, St Andrew's and St Peter's, was built in 1832 to a design by William Burn in the Gothic style with buttressed walls and a square tower. The pipe organ was added by Norman & Beard in 1914, and in 1922 Oscar Paterson contributed some of the stained glass windows such as 'The Sower'. In 2013 gravestones were vandalised in the graveyard. Holburn Head Lighthouse, within the parish territory, was completed in 1862 to a design by David & Thomas Stevenson and has since achieved Category B listed status.

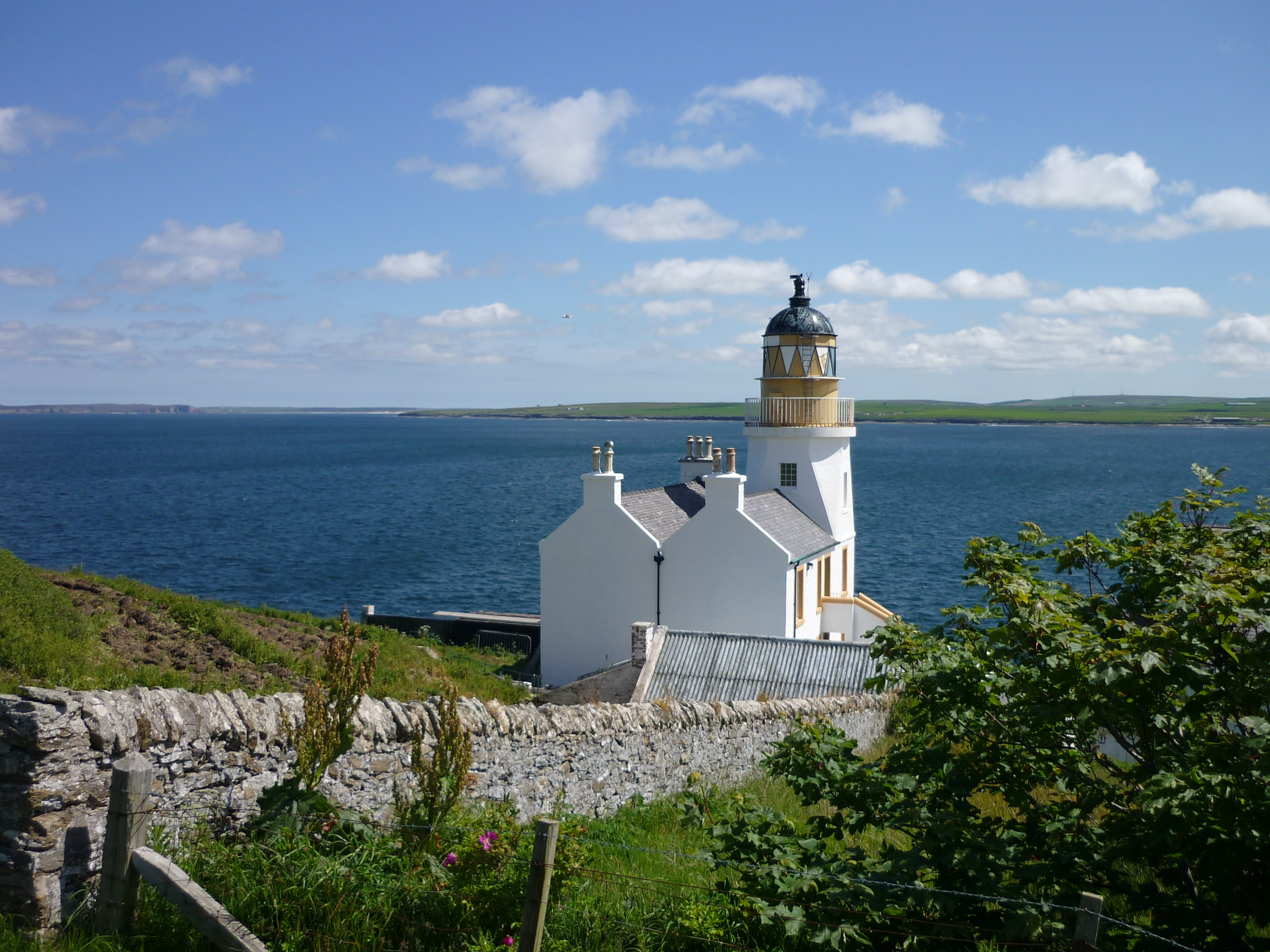
Holburn Head Lighthouse

The Swanson Gallery of Thurso hosts exhibitions throughout the year, and showcases glass art by Ian Pearson. The North Coast Visitor Centre also hosts exhibitions. Hotels of note include the 103-room Royal Hotel, Pentland Hotel, Waterside House, Murray House and the Category B listed Forss House Hotel, about 4 miles to the west of Thurso in a Georgian country mansion. At Sir John's Square is an ornamental garden and statue which was donated to the town by Sir Tollemache Sinclair in memory of his grandfather Sir John Sinclair, a prominent local figure responsible for the "compilation of the First Statistical Account of Scotland and the pioneering of agricultural reforms in Caithness". A Category C listed fountain was built in 1894 by the son of Sir George Sinclair. Also of note is the wellhouse of Meadow Well at the junction of Traill Street and Manson's Lane, which was the primary water supply for Thurso for centuries. The current well, with a conical roof, was completed in 1823.

The war memorial in Thurso dates from 1922 and was designed by Percy Portsmouth.

== Education ==
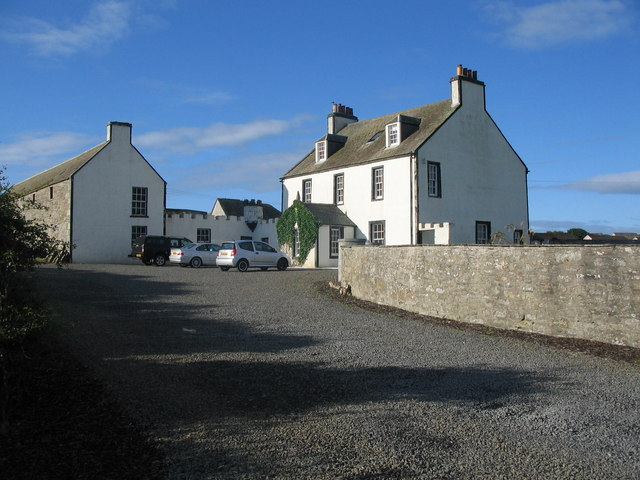
Pennyland House

The main campus of North Highland College, formerly Thurso College, is one of several partner colleges which constitute the University of the Highlands & Islands. It offers several certificate, diploma and degree courses from subjects as diverse as Nuclear Decommissioning, Hairdressing, Gamekeeping and Golf Management. Adjacent to the UHI is Thurso High School, the most northerly secondary school on the British mainland, established in 1958. The town also has three primary schools, Pennyland, Miller Academy Primary (Note: Originally Miller Institution, it changed to only a Primary School in 1958 when Thurso High School was built to accommodate the influx of people connected to the Dounreay Nuclear Power Station.) and Mount Pleasant. Mount Pleasant Primary School has a Scottish Gaelic medium unit, part of a revival of the language in Caithness. According to the 2011 census, 110 residents of the town age three and over (1.43%) speak Gaelic while 181 overall (2.35%) have some facility with the language. A Gaelic language nursery school, Cròileagan Inbhir Theòrsa, was created in the town in 1996.

North Coast Visitor Centre is a small museum that opened in 2021, following the closure of Caithness Horizons in 2019. The museum continues to host panels from the control room at the Dounreay Materials Testing Reactor (DMTR), which in 1958 had become Scotland's first operation nuclear reactor.

== Sport ==
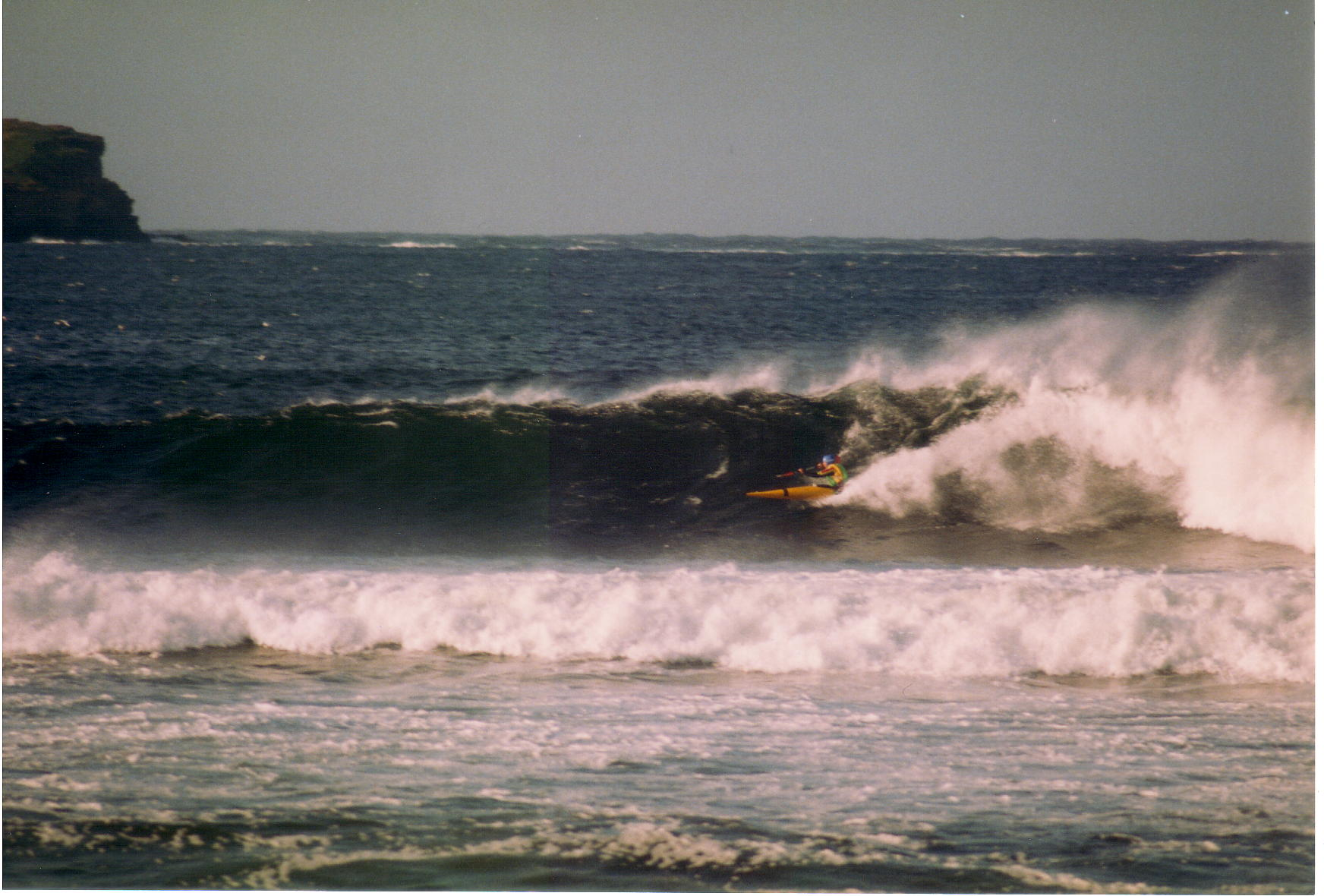
Thurso is popular with water sports enthusiasts.

With its powerful swells, Thurso is a notable location for surfing and kayaking, with international surfing championship events having regularly been held in the area. It attracts surfers from all over the world, and both the European Surfing Championships and Scottish Surf Kayaking Championships have been held in Caithness, with Thurso East being the main focus of activity. An annual raft race is organised by the North Coast Branch of Coastguard Association.

The football team, Thurso FC (nicknamed "the Vikings"), was established in 1998 and plays in the North Caledonian League. Caithness Crushers are a rugby league club playing in the Scotland Rugby League Conference Division 1, while Caithness RFC are a rugby union club that participate in the Caledonia One. The local athletics club is Caithness Amateur Athletics Club (C.A.A.C.); hurdler Moira Mcbeath was a 1986 Commonwealth Games athlete. Thurso has the largest swimming club in the Highland area, Thurso Amateur Swimming Club (TASC), with over 250 members. Thurso Bowling Club is next door to the Tesco supermarket. Also of note is Caithness Motocross Club, which stages races fortnightly during the summer on tracks around the county.

== Transport ==
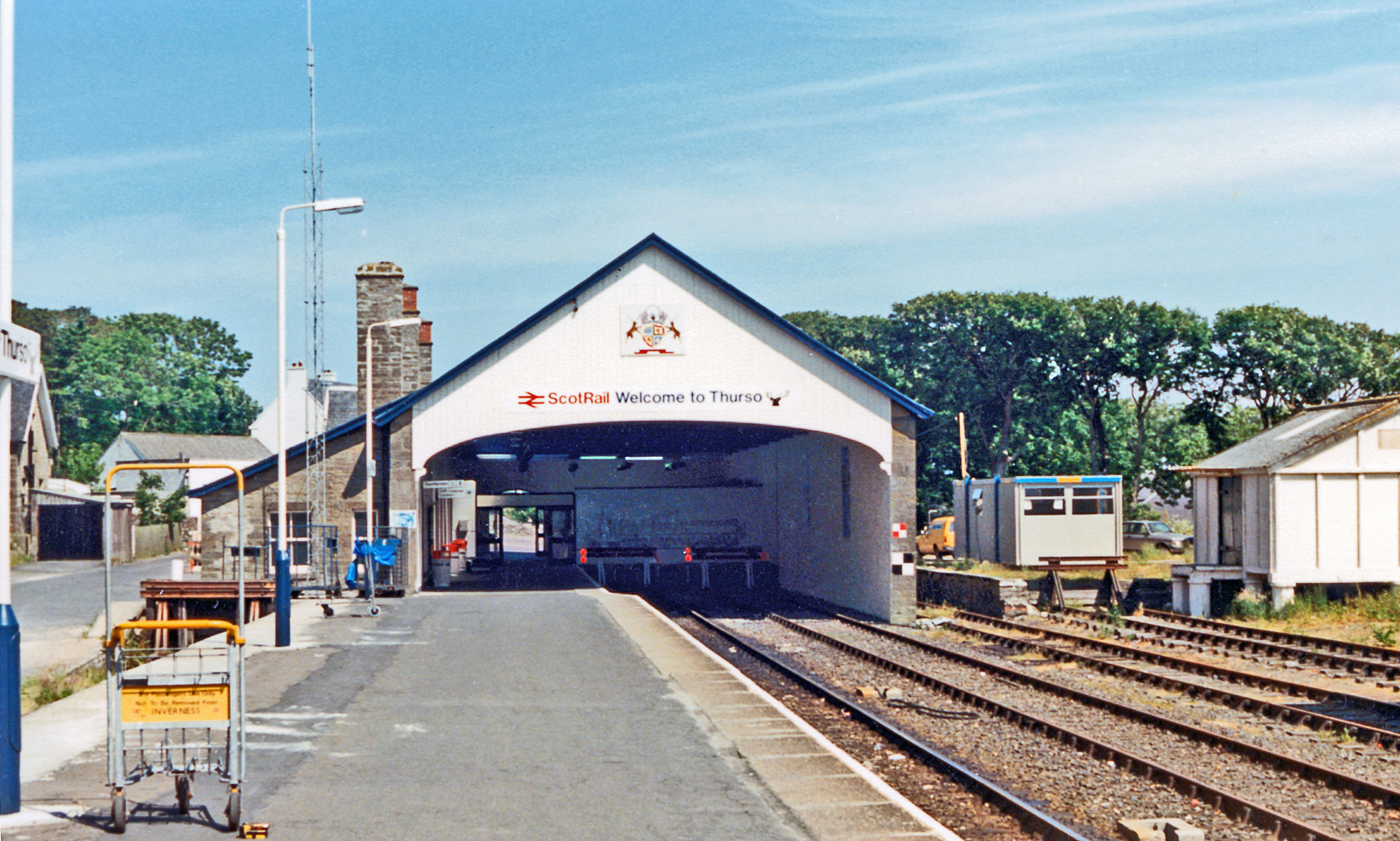
Thurso railway station

Thurso railway station opened in 1874. It was the most northern station on the Sutherland and Caithness Railway. The station became part of the Highland Railway Company in the late 19th century before being absorbed into the London, Midland and Scottish Railway in 1923. and it is now part of the Far North Line.

The nearby port of Scrabster provides ferry services to the Orkney Islands. The A9 trunk road, which connects Thurso to Inverness, Perth, the M90 motorway and the Central Belt ends at the ferry terminal. Stagecoach run bus services from Thurso to Wick and John o' Groats, and a long-distance service to Helmsdale and Inverness.

== Twin towns ==
Thurso is twinned with Brilon, Germany.

== Notable people ==
- Andrew Geddes Bain (1797–1864) — geologist, road engineer, palaeontologist and explorer.
- Colin Birss (born 1964) — British judge.
- David Orson Calder (1823–1884) — academician and pioneer settler in Utah.
- John Charles "Jock" Campbell (1894–1942) — British Army officer, recipient of the Victoria Cross.
- Martin Carr (born 1968) — writer and musician.
- Robert Dick (1811–1866) — geologist; lived in Thurso from 1830 until death.
- John Finlaison (1783–1860) — civil servant and government actuary.
- George Finlayson (1790–1823) — naturalist and traveler.
- Bryan Gunn (born 1963) — professional football goalkeeper and manager.
- Robin Harper (born 1940) — politician.
- William Henderson (1810–1872) — physician and homeopath.
- Christina Keith (1889–1963), Scottish academic and author
- Jock Macdonald (1897–1960) — Canadian painter and art educator.
- Gary Mackay-Steven (born 1990) — professional football winger, played for Dundee United F.C., Heart of Midlothian F.C., Aberdeen F.C. and Celtic F.C.
- Tommy McGee (born 1979) — Scottish rugby league and rugby union footballer.
- Anne McKevitt (born 1967) — entrepreneur, TV Personality, author and philanthropist.
- Martin Rennie (born 1975) — professional football manager.
- Sir William David Ross, (1877–1971) — moral philosopher, editor and translator of Aristotle.
- Arthur St. Clair (1737–1818) — American Revolutionary War soldier and politician.
- Sir William Alexander Smith (1854–1914) — founder of the Boys Brigade.
- Donald Swanson (1848–1924) — senior police officer in the Metropolitan Police during the Jack the Ripper murders.
- Rev Walter Ross Taylor (1805–1896) Moderator of the Free Church of Scotland in 1884 and his son Rev Walter Ross Taylor (1838–1907) Moderator in 1900
