= Murdoch Paterson =

Murdoch Paterson (September 1826 – 9 August 1898) was an engineer and architect based in Inverness, Scotland, who was chief engineer of the Highland Railway.

== Background ==
He was born in September 1826, one of five sons of Donald Paterson (1778–1851), farmer, at Dell of Inshes, Inverness, and Elizabeth Munro (1789–1847).

He was educated at Inverness Royal Academy, and initially worked as a wine merchant in Inverness.

His elder brother, William Paterson, was also an engineer.

== Career ==
In 1846, he became articled to Joseph Mitchell, the Inspector of Highland Roads and Bridges, and surveyor of railways in the Highlands. In 1851 he worked on expanding the Port of Inverness, and from 1854 worked with Joseph Mitchell on the construction of new lines for the Highland Railway, including Inverness to Keith.

In 1862, Joseph Mitchell set up a partnership with William and Murdoch Paterson, as Joseph Mitchell and Company. Mitchell retired in 1867, and Murdoch became chief engineer of the Highland Railway on 6 November 1874.

As well as engineering the construction of new lines for the Highland Railway, he also prepared the designs of many new stations.

He died on 9 August 1898 whilst still in post, just three months before the opening of the new line from Inverness to Aviemore. His estate was valued at £10,611 (equivalent to £1,192,436 in 2025).

Business positions
Preceded by Peter Wilson	Chief Engineer of the Highland Railway; 1874-1898	Succeeded by William Roberts

== Wives and children ==
He married Jane MacCallum (1826 - 1868) in January 1852. They had two children:

- Elizabeth Paterson (1853 - 1933)
- Donald Paterson (1854 - 1885).

He married Frances Wiles (1837 - 1906) in London in 1870 and they also had two children:

- Violet Mary J Paterson (b. 1875)
- Murdoch William Paterson (1877 - 1880).

== Main works ==
- 1863 Railway Bridge on Castle Grant Estate at Grantown-on-Spey
- 1863 Tain railway station
- 1864 Balnagown Railway Viaduct
- 1864 Fearn railway station
- 1865 Ardgay railway station
- 1867 Shin Railway Viaduct
- 1868 Lairg railway station
- 1869 Achanalt railway station
- 1869 Achnasheen railway station
- 1869 Garve railway station
- 1869 Dingwall locomotive shed
- 1869 Strathpeffer railway station
- 1869 Stromeferry railway station
- 1870 Railway Bridge over Golspie Burn
- 1872 Altnabreac railway station
- 1872 Bilbster railway station
- 1872 Bower railway station
- 1872 Georgemas Junction railway station
- 1872 Halkirk railway station
- 1872 Scotscalder railway station
- 1872 Thurso railway station
- 1872 Watten railway station
- 1872 Wick railway station
- 1876 Inverness railway station
- 1877 Achanalt railway station
- 1877 Delney railway station
- 1877 Forres railway station
- 1877 Keith railway station
- 1877 Tain railway station
- 1878 Dunkeld railway station
- 1878 Fearn railway station
- 1878 Invergordon railway station
- 1878 Kincraig railway station
- 1878 Lhanbryde railway station
- 1878 Inverness gasworks railway station
- 1879 Aberfeldy station house
- 1882 Blair Atholl railway station
- 1882 Pitlochry railway station
- 1883 Enzie railway station
- 1883 Forgie railway station
- 1883 Rathven railway station
- 1884 Buckie railway station
- 1884 Novar railway station
- 1884 Portessie railway station
- 1884 Stromeferry railway station
- 1885 Fodderty Junction railway station
- 1885 Nairn railway station
- 1885 Strathpeffer railway station
- 1886 Dingwall railway station
- 1887 Grantown railway station
- 1891 Allangrange railway station
- 1891 Avoch railway station
- 1891 Corrachie railway station
- 1891 Fortrose railway station
- 1891 Munlochy railway station
- 1891 Redcastle railway station
- 1892 Burghead railway station
- 1892 Hopeman railway station
- 1893 Culloden Moor railway viaduct
- 1893 Fochabers Bridge railway station
- 1894 Tomatin Viaduct
- 1894 Waterloo Bridge Inverness
- 1895 Culloden Moor railway station
- 1895 Daviot railway station
- 1895 Moy railway station
- 1895 Tomatin railway station
- 1897 Allt-na-Slanach Viaduct Moy
- 1897 Duirinish railway station
- 1897 Erbusaig railway station
- 1897 Kyle of Lochalsh railway station
- 1897 Plockton railway station
- 1897 Slochd Mhuic Railway Viaduct

== Gallery ==
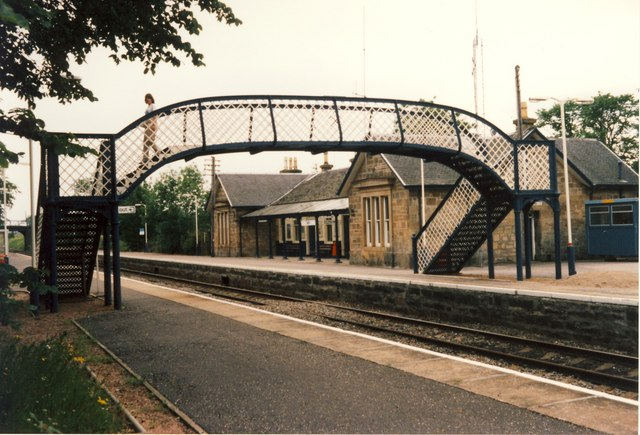
Tain railway station

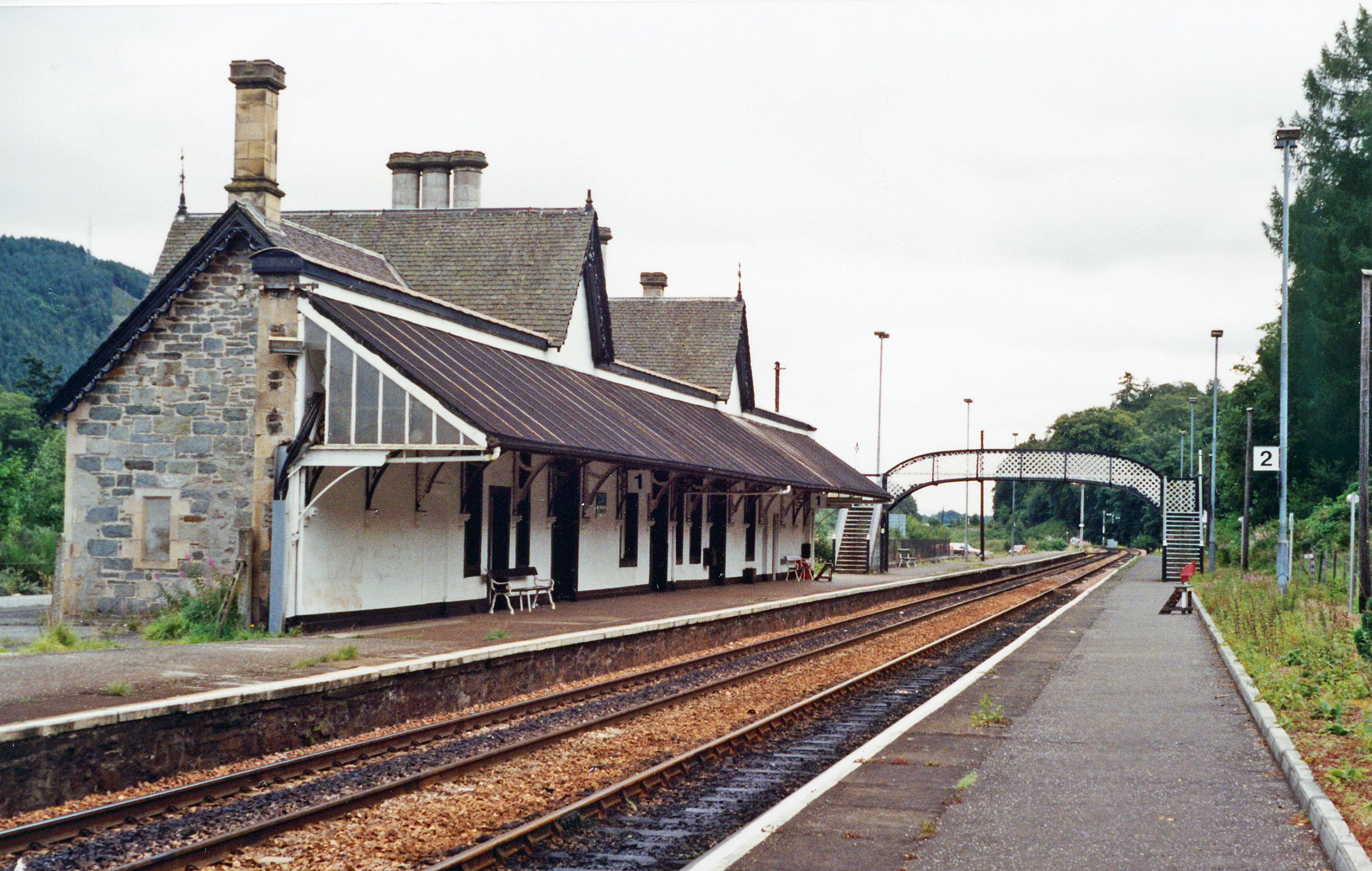
Dunkeld & Birnam station

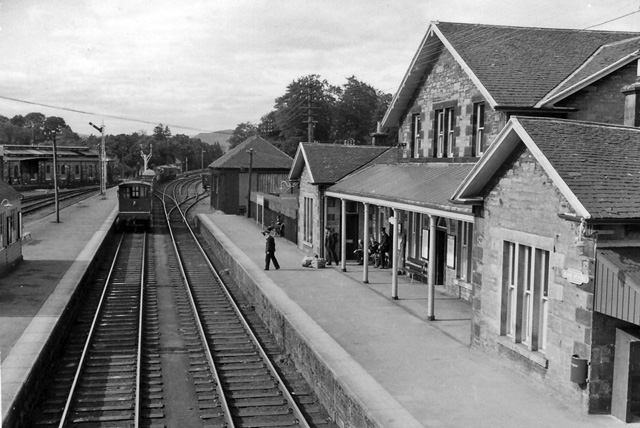
Blair Atholl Station

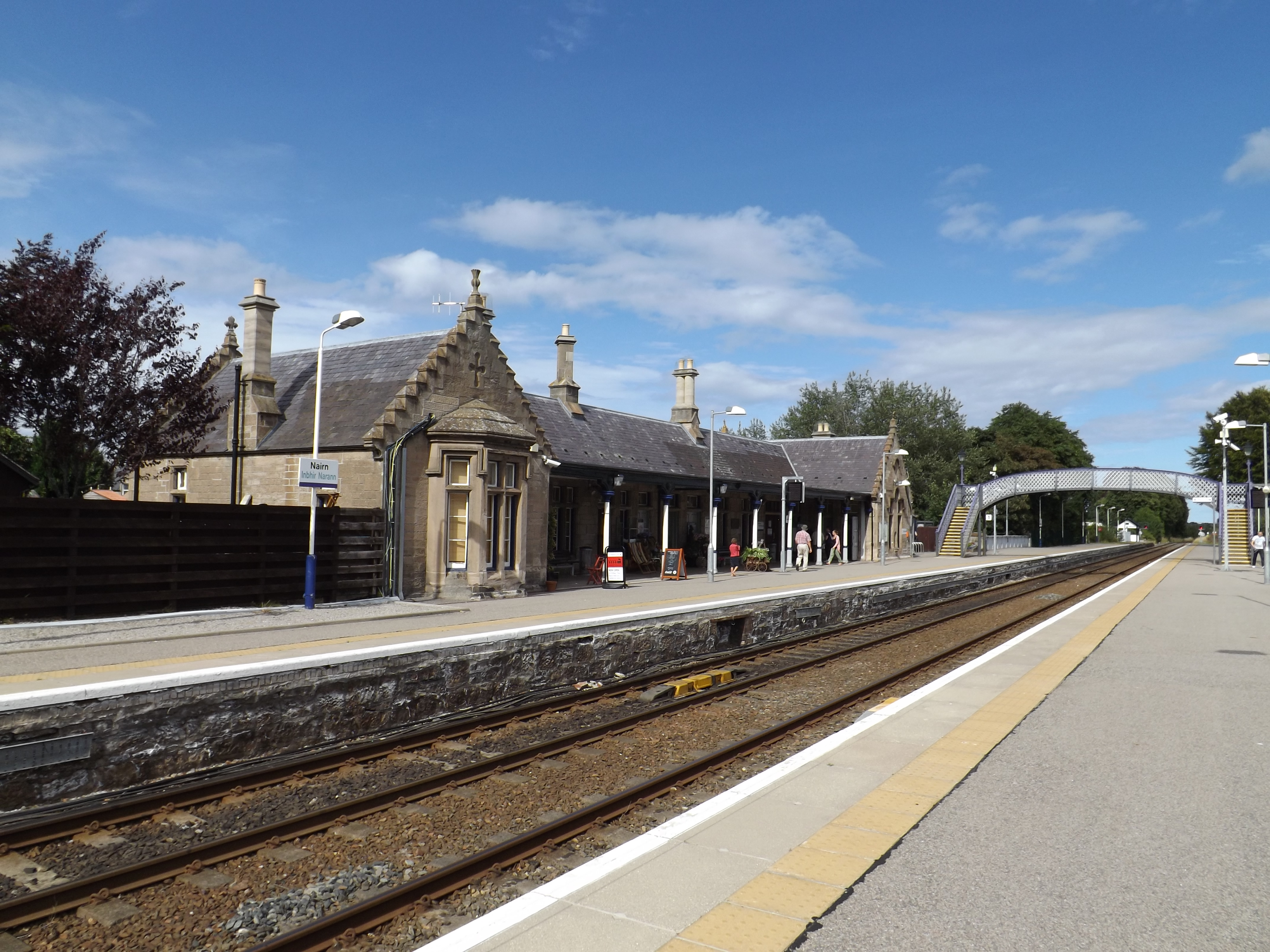
Nairn railway station

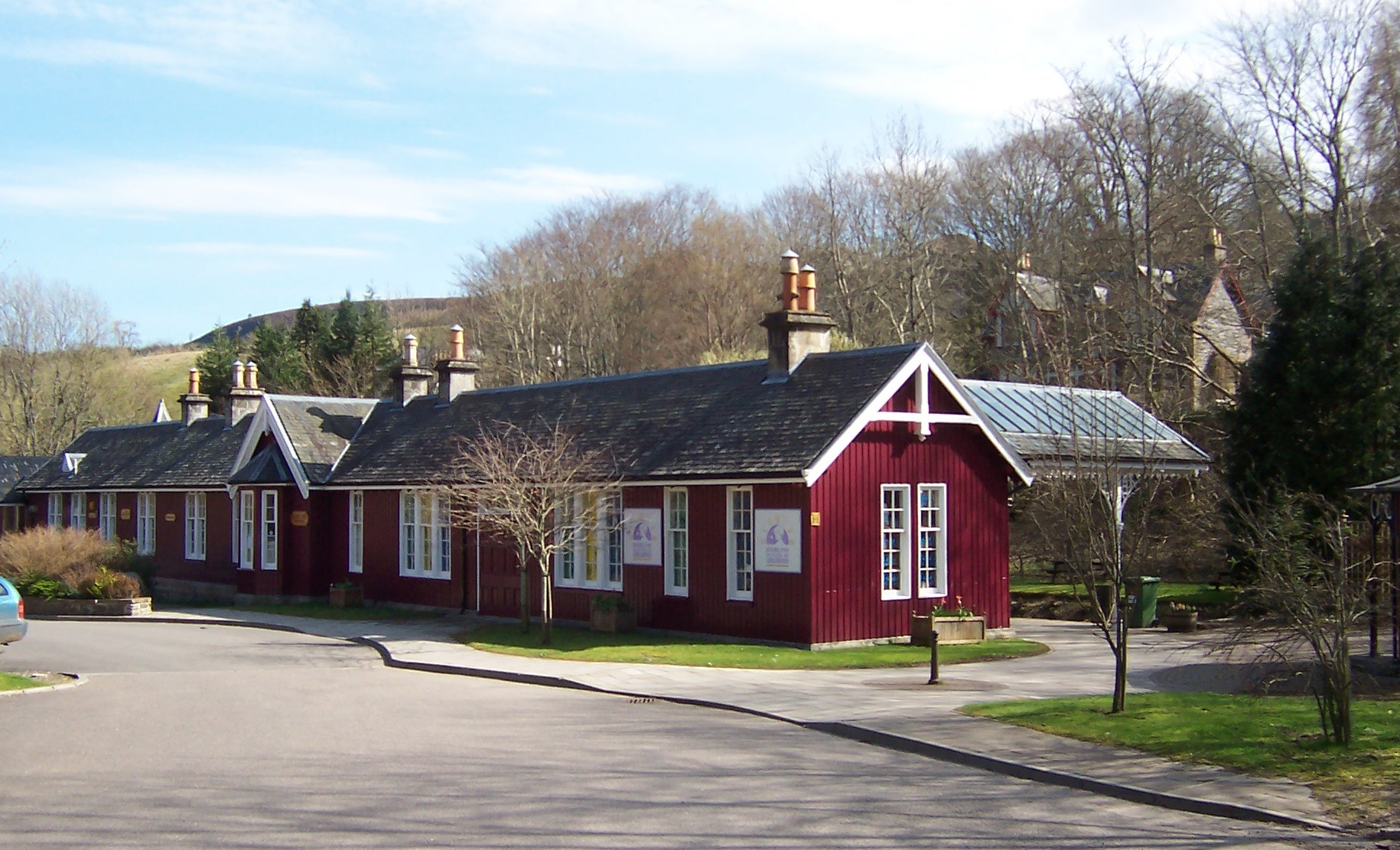
Strathpeffer station

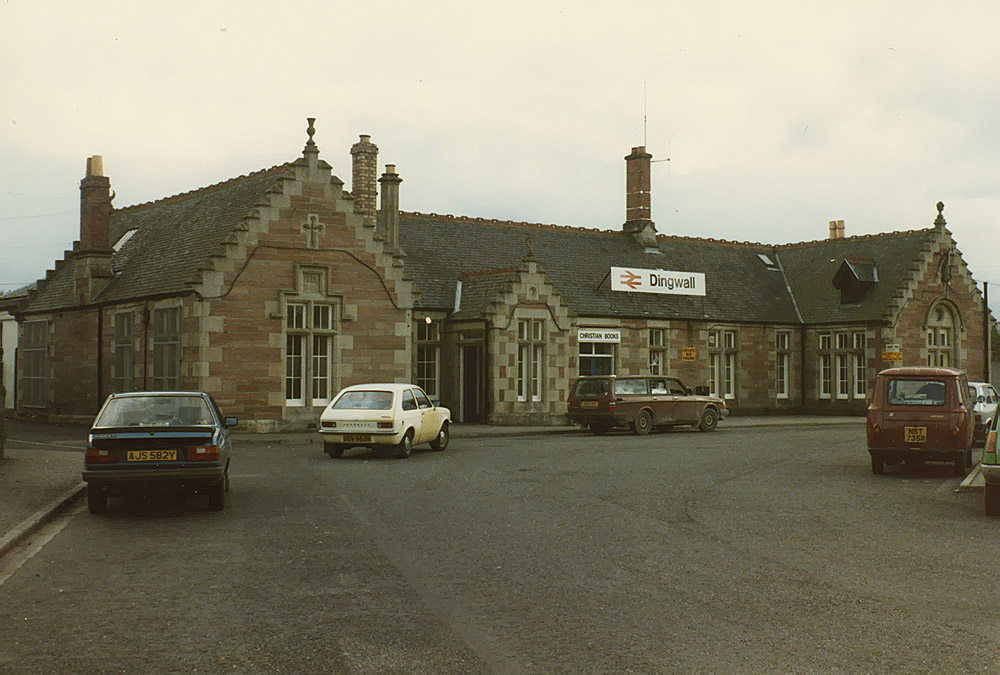
Dingwall station

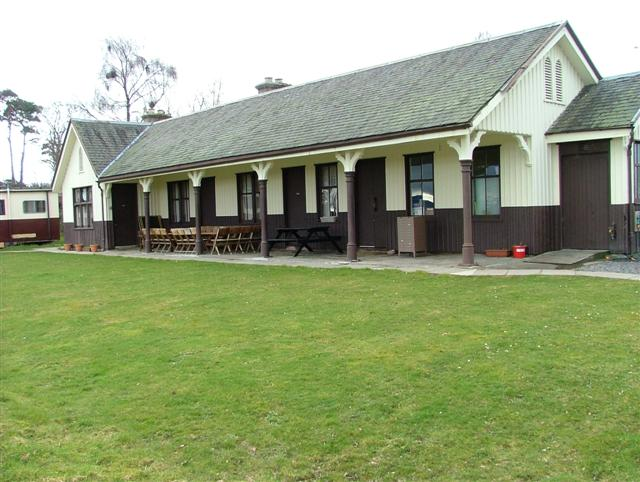
Redcastle Railway Station

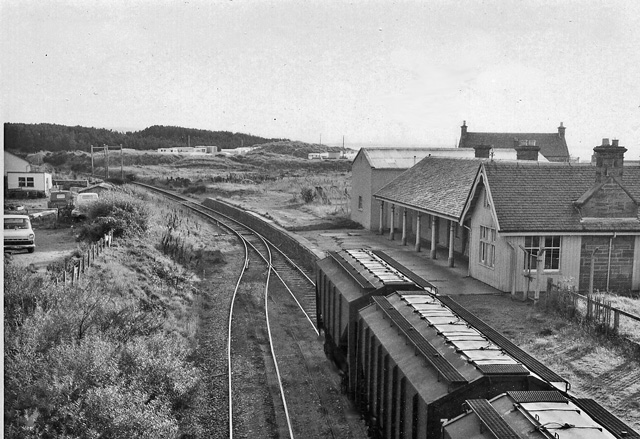
Burghead railway station

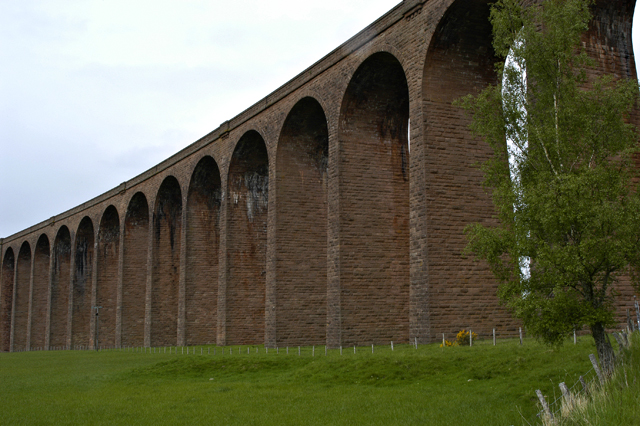
Culloden Viaduct

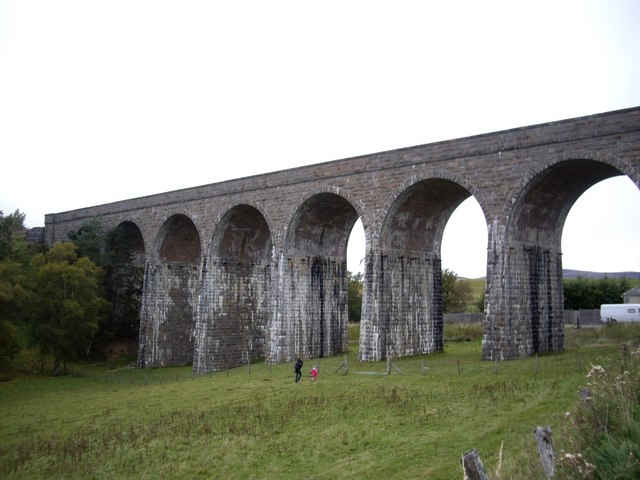
Tomatin railway viaduct

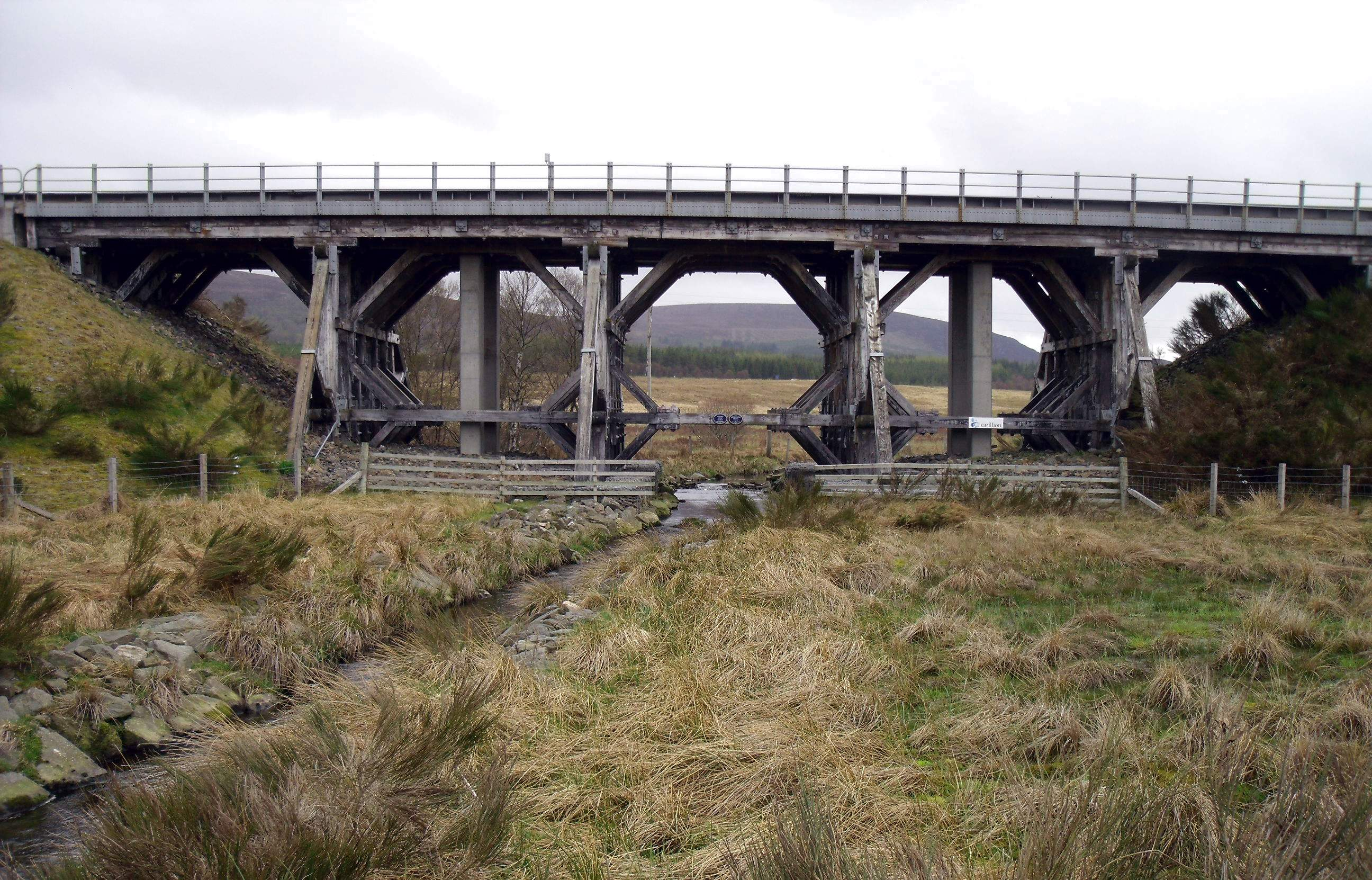
Aultnaslanach Railway Viaduct

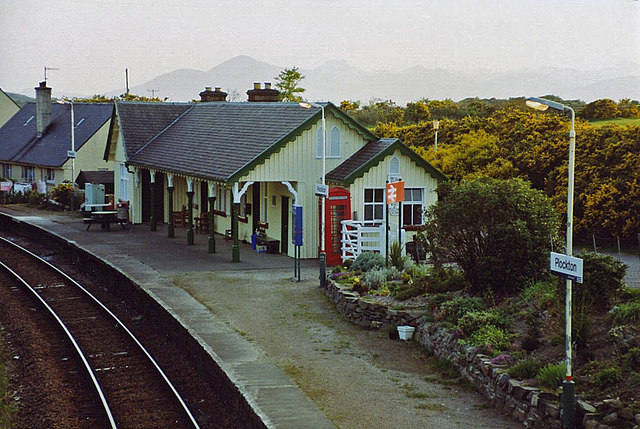
Plockton Station

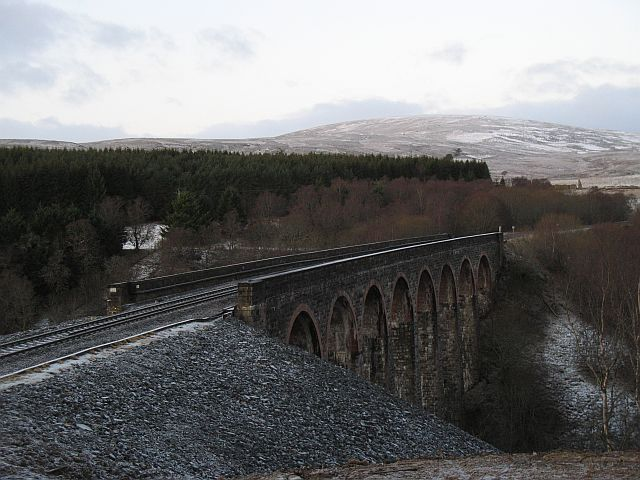
Slochd Mhuic Railway Viaduct
