= Hoy railway station =

Disused railway station in Highland, Scotland

Hoy
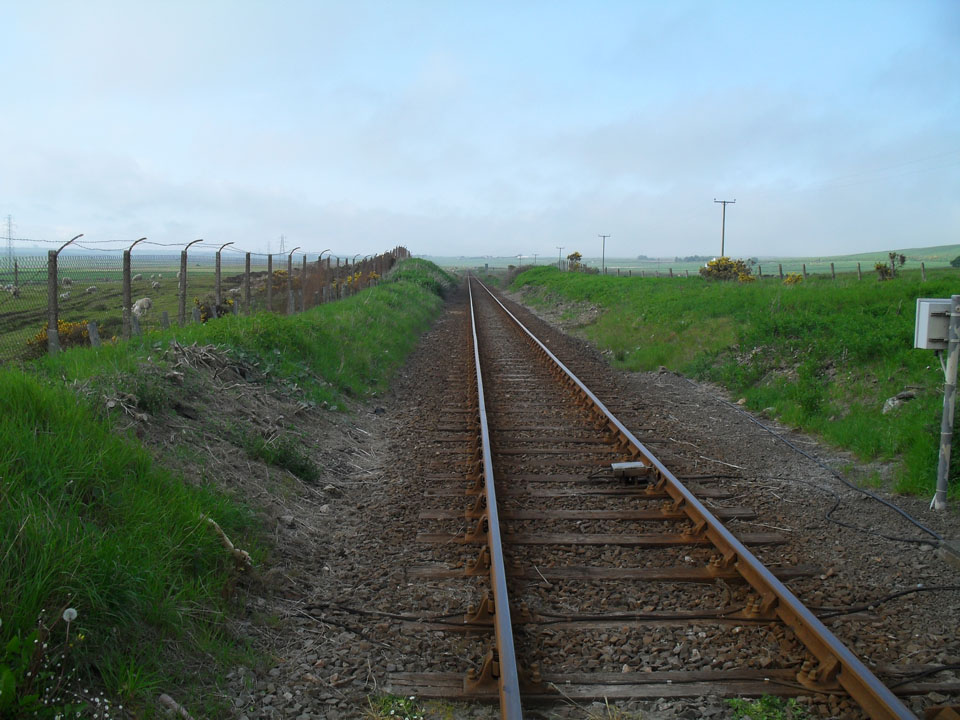
- Site of Hoy station, 2010

General information
- Location: Near Halkirk, Highland; Scotland
- Coordinates: 58.5233°N 3.4644°W
- Platforms: 1

Other information
- Status: Disused

History
- Original company: Sutherland and Caithness Railway
- Pre-grouping: Highland Railway
- Post-grouping: LMS

Key dates
- 1 October 1874: Opened
- 29 November 1965: Closed
Location

Hoy was a railway station located northeast of Halkirk, Highland.

== History ==
The station did not open with the rest of the Sutherland and Caithness Railway on 28 July 1874, but a station here was still considered, depending on traffic levels. It instead opened on 1 October 1874, and closed on 29 November 1965.

It was located on the north side of the B874 road on the east side of the village of Halkirk, next to the current railway level crossing. Also at the former station site are military fuel tanks, visible as grass covered mounds, that were built to serve nearby airfields.

The Halkirk Games, first organized in 1886, were held in a nearby field.

Along with Georgemas Junction and Halkirk, it was one of three stations serving Halkirk prior to the 1960s. Georgemas Junction, which is 2 miles (3.2 km) east of Halkirk village, remains open.

Preceding station	Historical railways	Following station
Thurso; Station and Line open	Highland Railway; Sutherland and Caithness Railway; Thurso Branch	Georgemas Junction; Station and Line open
