= Georgemas Junction railway station =

Railway station in Highland, Scotland

Georgemas Junction Scottish Gaelic: Snaidhm Georgemas
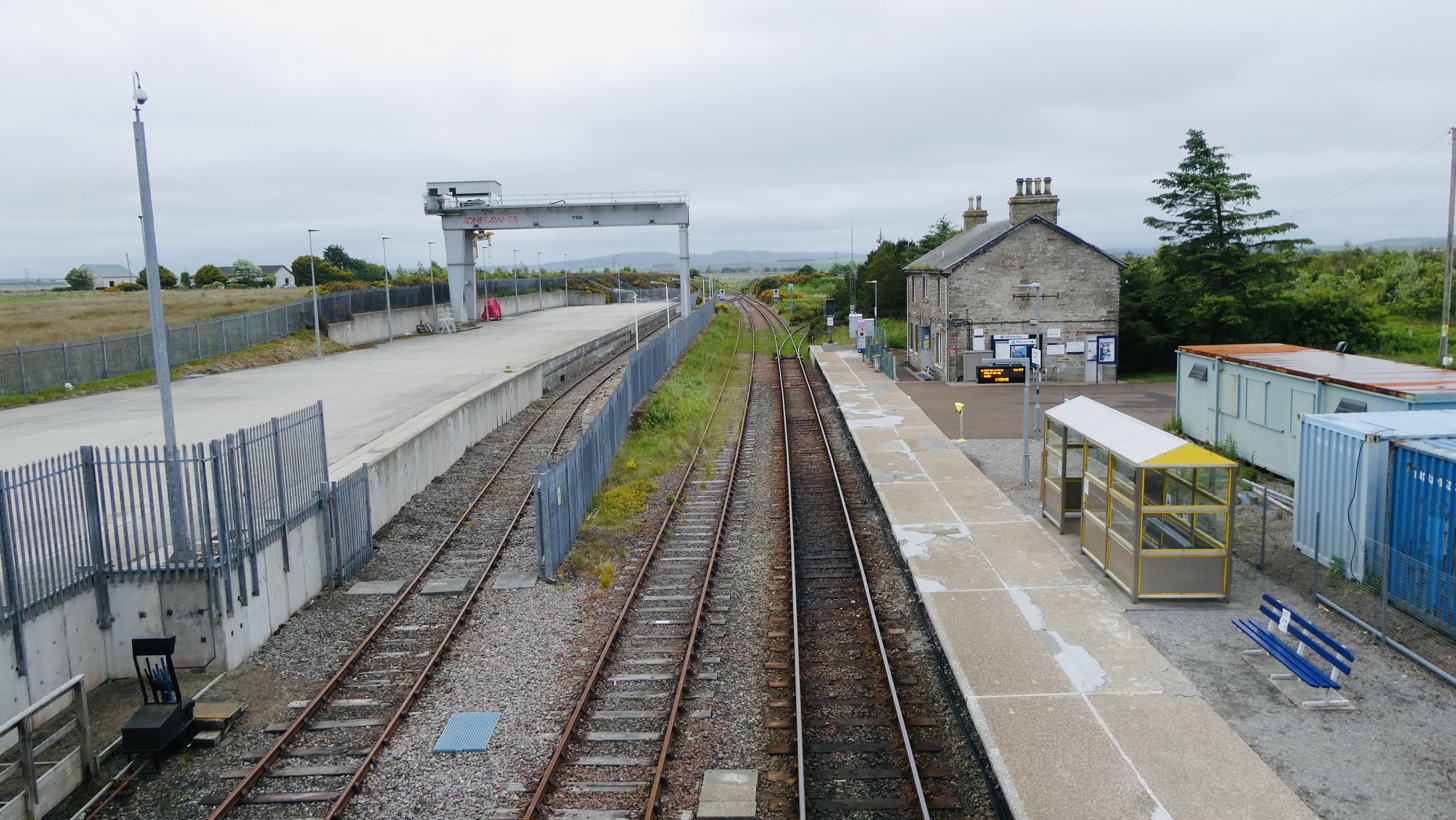
- The platform and freight terminal at Georgemas Junction, looking west

General information
- Location: Georgemas, Highland; Scotland
- Coordinates: 58.5135°N 3.4518°W
- Grid reference: ND155592
- Manager: ScotRail
- Platforms: 1

Other information
- Station code: GGJ

History
- Original company: Sutherland and Caithness Railway
- Pre-grouping: Highland Railway
- Post-grouping: London, Midland and Scottish Railway; British Railways

Key dates
- 1874: Opened

Passengers
- 2021/22: ▲1,032
- 2022/23: ▲1,318
- 2023/24: ▲1,588
- 2024/25: ▲1,992
- 2025/26: ▼1,784
Location
Notes
- Passenger statistics from the Office of Rail and Road

Georgemas Junction railway station is a railway station on the Far North Line in the far north of Scotland. The station, which is in the Highland council area, serves several rural hamlets in the historic county of Caithness, including Georgemas, Roadside and Banniskirk and the village of Halkirk, which lies approximately 1.6 miles (2.6 km) west of the station. It is the penultimate station before the line terminus at Wick (147 miles 22 chains (237 km) from Inverness).

The station has a single platform which is long enough to accommodate a six-carriage train. The station is managed by ScotRail, who operate the services at the station. West of the station is Georgemas junction which is where the branch line to Thurso starts. The junction is the northernmost railway junction in the United Kingdom.

== History ==
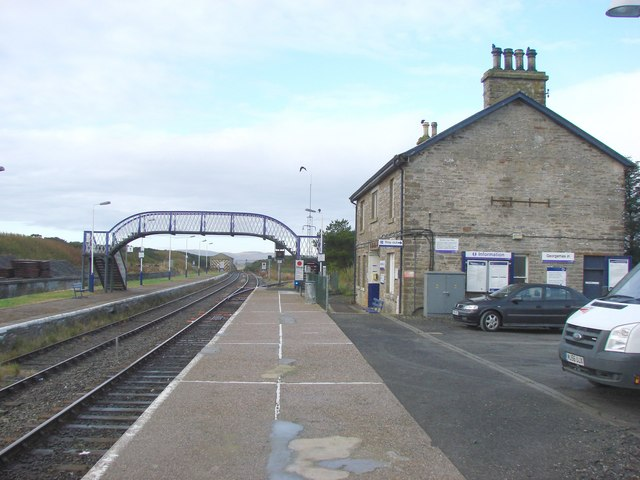
Georgemas Junction station in 2007, before removal of the footbridge and second platform in connection with provision of a new freight handling facility

The station was built by the Sutherland and Caithness Railway (S&CR). The station buildings were designed by Murdoch Paterson and it opened on 28 July 1874 and on that date the Highland Railway absorbed the S&CR and operated the newly completed line from Helmsdale to Thurso and Wick. A wrought-iron turntable of 45 feet (14 m) diameter built by the Railway Steel and Plant Company of Manchester was installed at the station.

In 1902, Donald Mackenzie, station master was appointed first station master of Dornoch railway station.

From 1 January 1923 the station was operated by the London Midland and Scottish Railway.

At the end of February 1937 trains were stranded at Georgemas Junction because of heavy snow. A goods train from Inverness got stuck in a drift 9 feet (2.7 m) deep. An engine with a snow plough was also stuck at the same location.

=== Trains via Thurso ===
Until diesel multiple unit trains were introduced by British Rail in the early 1990s, all trains on the Far North Line were locomotive-hauled, initially by Highland Railway steam locomotives, then by LMSR steam locomotives and latterly by British Railways steam and finally Class 37 diesel locomotives. Northbound passenger trains would divide at Georgemas Junction, with the rear portion for Thurso and the front portion for Wick. A locomotive was stabled at Georgemas Junction to haul the Thurso carriages.

Following the introduction of Class 156 diesel multiple units on the line, trains were always composed of two trainsets (four cars) and at Georgemas, these would split in half with the front portion heading to Wick, the rear to Thurso. This practice was halted with the introduction of Class 158 sets which operate as single sets - on arrival at Georgemas Junction from Inverness, trains reverse to reach Thurso, and then reverse again from Thurso back to Georgemas Junction (stopping a second time) and on to Wick. An easement to the National Routeing Guide allows passengers for Wick to stay on the train between Georgemas Junction and Thurso, which would otherwise technically be off-route.

=== Transhipment hub ===
Georgemas Junction station has been used for freight services that transport containers on to lorries which are taken by road to Wick and Thurso, as well as by ferry to Orkney. In the early 2000s, EWS operated a freight train for Safeway supermarket, running containers from Mossend to be unloaded at Georgemas.

In 2012, platform 1 and the station footbridge were removed when Direct Rail Services constructed a new freight terminal at Georgemas. The platform – which was located on a passing loop that was not directly connected to the Thurso branch – had already long been virtually unused by passenger trains, since all trains passing through the station run to or from Thurso. The purpose of the platform dates back to the time when loco-hauled trains divided/attached at the station: an Inverness-bound portion from Thurso would pass non-stop through the remaining platform 2, loop around the Wick portion standing on platform 1, then reverse and attach to the Wick train from behind.

The freight terminal has been used for taking nuclear material from Dounreay to Sellafield. Since decommissioning of Dounreay, and after a trial by Tesco in February 2021, the facility sat idle with no trains using the site.

== Facilities ==
Facilities at this station include a payphone that accepts card and coins, designated seating area, an LED departure board, a cycle rack with 10 spaces, and a free car park with 2 spaces. The nearest bus stop to the station is located 850 metres (930 yd) to the north.

== Passenger volume ==
Passenger Volume at Georgemas Junction
	2004–05	2005–06	2006–07	2007–08	2008–09	2009–10	2010–11	2011–12	2012–13	2013–14	2014–15	2015–16	2016–17	2017–18	2018–19	2019–20	2020–21	2021–22	2022–23	2023–24	2024–25
Entries and exits	1,108	1,018	989	893	1,500	1,482	1,630	1,682	1,906	1,652	1,696	1,572	1,502	1,320	1,576	1,570	234	1,032	1,318	1,588	1,992

The statistics cover twelve month periods that start in April.

== Services ==
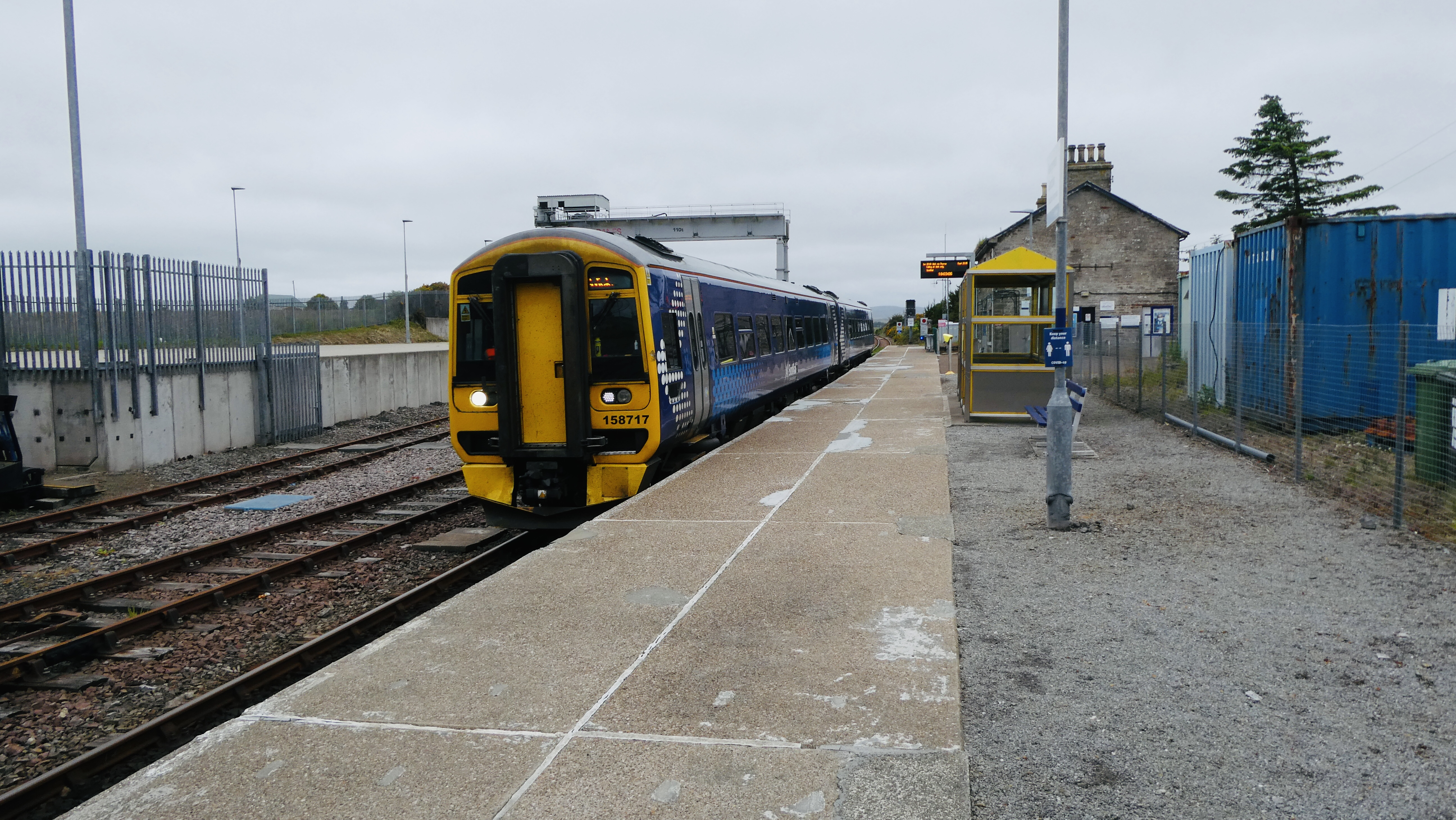
158717 at Georgemas Junction

On weekdays and Saturdays, there are four trains per day each way between Inverness and Wick, resulting in 8 trains per day to Thurso, as all trains in both directions go to Thurso on their way to Inverness or Wick. On Sundays, the frequency is reduced to one train per day each way, meaning two trains go to Thurso.

Preceding station	National Rail	Following station
Scotscalder or Forsinard	ScotRail; Far North Line	Thurso
Wick	ScotRail; Far North Line	Thurso
	Historical railways	
Halkirk line open, station closed	Highland Railway; Sutherland and Caithness Railway	Bower line open, station closed
Hoy line open, station closed	Highland Railway; Sutherland and Caithness Railway	Bower line open, station closed

== Bibliography ==
- Brailsford, Martyn, ed. (December 2017) [1987]. Railway Track Diagrams 1: Scotland & Isle of Man (6th ed.). Frome: Trackmaps. ISBN 978-0-9549866-9-8.
- Butt, R. V. J. (October 1995). The Directory of Railway Stations: details every public and private passenger station, halt, platform and stopping place, past and present (1st ed.). Sparkford: Patrick Stephens Ltd. ISBN 978-1-85260-508-7. OCLC 60251199. OL 11956311M.
- Jowett, Alan (March 1989). Jowett's Railway Atlas of Great Britain and Ireland: From Pre-Grouping to the Present Day (1st ed.). Sparkford: Patrick Stephens Ltd. ISBN 978-1-85260-086-0. OCLC 22311137.
