= Bilbster =

Hamlet in Caithness, Scotland

Coordinates: 58.45°N 03.23°W

Bilbster: Scottish Gaelic: Bialbost
- Location within the Caithness area
- OS grid reference: ND279530
- District: Caithness
- Council area: Highland
- Country: Scotland
- Sovereign state: United Kingdom
- Post town: Wick
- Dialling code: 01955 621
- Police: Scotland
- Fire: Scottish
- Ambulance: Scottish
- UK Parliament: Caithness, Sutherland and Easter Ross
- Scottish Parliament: Caithness, Sutherland and Ross

Bilbster is a rural area in the Highlands region of Scotland, formerly in the historic county of Caithness. It is situated on the A882 road and consists of just a handful of houses spread over approximately 1 square mile (2.6 km^{2}). The nearest village is Watten which is approximately 2 miles (3 km) to the north-west and the nearest town is Wick which is 5 miles (8 km) to the south-east. Bilbster is a farming area. The River Wick, which is a productive salmon river, flows to the north of the settlement.

Bilbster railway station was closed in 1960.

A nearby wind farm was opened in 2008, consisting of three wind turbines that together are capable of generating 3.9 megawatts of electricity.

The Kingdom Hall of Jehovah's Witnesses in Wick moved to a newly constructed building in the area in January 2024.

== History ==
=== Neolithic to Iron Age ===
There is evidence of human activity in the area as far back as the neolithic period. This includes a chambered cairn, dated to around c. 4000 to c. 2000 BC, and a standing stone, dated to c. 3000 to c. 1500 BC. Both sites are legally protected under the Ancient Monuments and Archaeological Areas Act 1979, as scheduled monuments of national importance. There is also evidence of a possible iron age broch, though there have been no excavations to confirm this.
