= Watten railway station =

Disused railway station in Highland, Scotland

Watten
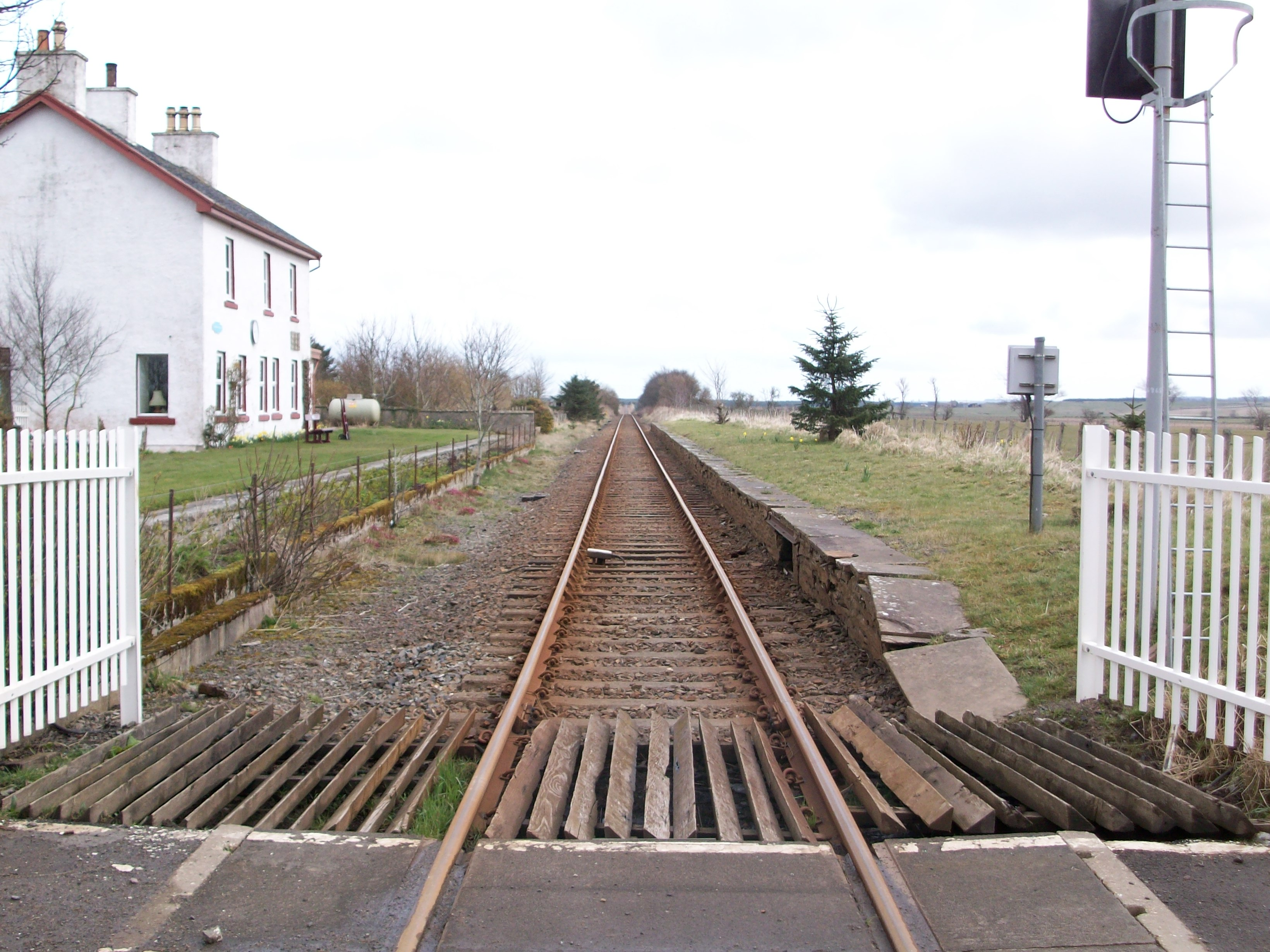
- Watten disused railway station and the Far North Line

General information
- Location: Loch Watten, Highland; Scotland
- Coordinates: 58.4835°N 3.2853°W
- Grid reference: ND250557
- Platforms: 2

Other information
- Status: Disused

History
- Original company: Sutherland and Caithness Railway
- Pre-grouping: Highland Railway

Key dates
- 28 July 1874: Opened
- 13 June 1960: Closed
Location

Watten was a railway station located at the east end of Loch Watten, Highland between Halkirk and Wick, Scotland.

The station opened on 28 July 1874. The station master from 1876 to 1909 was Mr. Phimster.

It was one of a number of smaller stations on the Far North Line which were closed in 1960.

== Sources ==
- Butt, R. V. J. (October 1995). The Directory of Railway Stations: details every public and private passenger station, halt, platform and stopping place, past and present (1st ed.). Sparkford: Patrick Stephens Ltd. ISBN 978-1-85260-508-7. OCLC 60251199. OL 11956311M.
- Jowett, Alan (March 1989). Jowett's Railway Atlas of Great Britain and Ireland: From Pre-Grouping to the Present Day (1st ed.). Sparkford: Patrick Stephens Ltd. ISBN 978-1-85260-086-0. OCLC 22311137.

Preceding station	Historical railways	Following station
Bower; Station closed; Line open	Highland Railway; Sutherland and Caithness Railway	Bilbster; Station closed; Line open
