= Inverness railway station =

Railway station in the Highlands, Scotland

Inverness Scottish Gaelic: Inbhir Nis
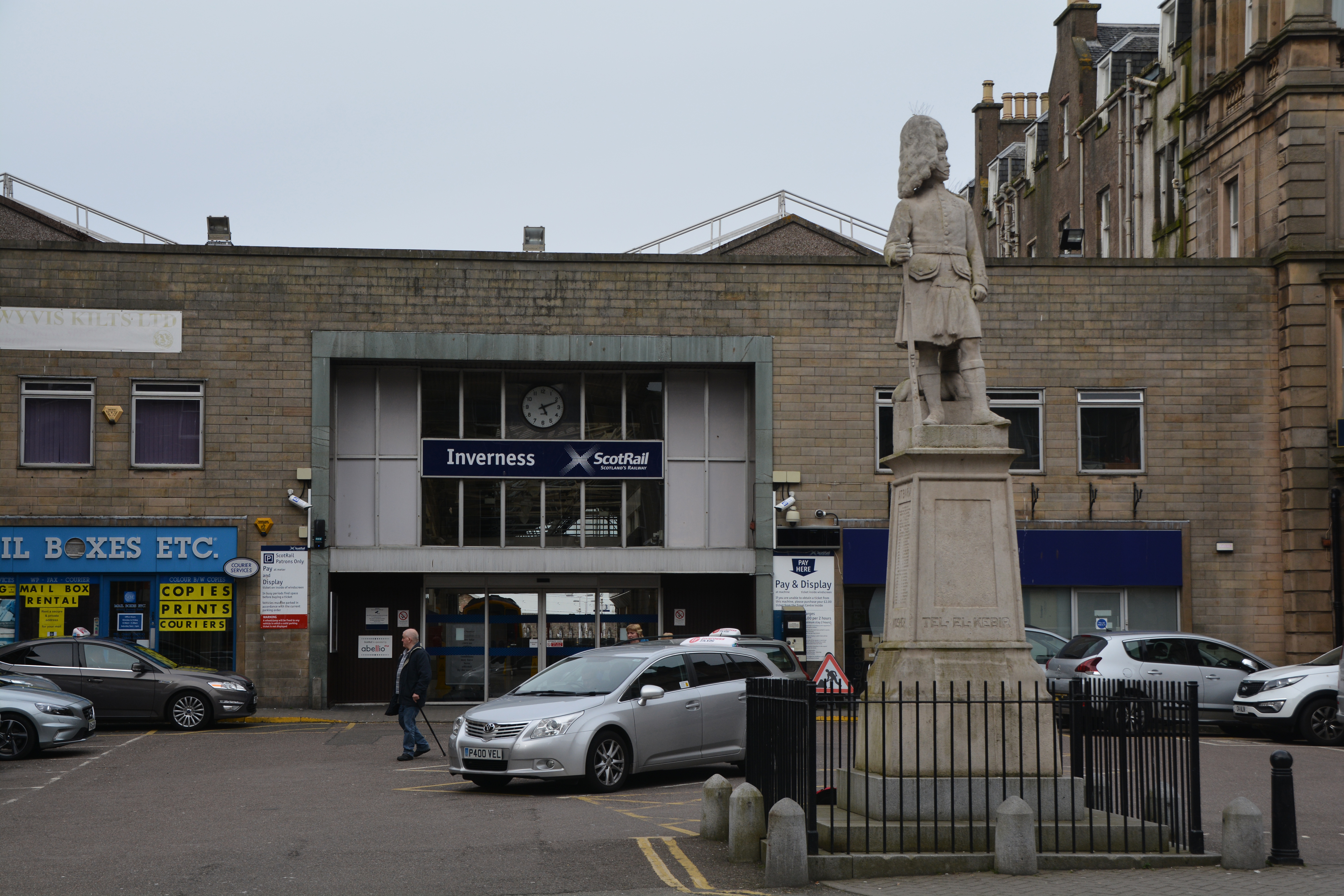
- The main entrance to the station (2016)

General information
- Location: Inverness, Highland, Scotland
- Coordinates: 57.4800°N 4.2230°W
- Grid reference: NH667454
- Owner: Network Rail
- Manager: ScotRail
- Platforms: 7

Other information
- Station code: INV
- IATA code: ZIV

History
- Original company: Inverness and Nairn Railway
- Pre-grouping: Highland Railway
- Post-grouping: London Midland and Scottish Railway

Key dates
- 5 November 1855: Opened

Passengers
- 2020/21: ▼0.232 million
- Interchange: ▼9,422
- 2021/22: ▲0.753 million
- Interchange: ▲33,187
- 2022/23: ▲0.975 million
- Interchange: ▲38,939
- 2023/24: ▲1.170 million
- Interchange: ▲51,133
- 2024/25: ▲1.173 million
- Interchange: ▲54,976
Location
Notes
- Passenger statistics from the Office of Rail and Road

Inverness railway station serves the city of Inverness, in the Highlands of Scotland. It is the terminus of the Highland Main Line, the Aberdeen–Inverness line (of which the Inverness and Nairn Railway is now a part), the Kyle of Lochalsh line and the Far North Line.

The Aberdeen and Perth lines diverge at Millburn Junction, a short distance beyond Welsh's Bridge. Platforms 1–4 are 118 miles 3 chains (190 km) from Perth, via Carrbridge); Millburn Junction is 117 miles 37 chains (189 km) from Perth and 143 miles 39 chains (231 km) via Dava.

== History ==
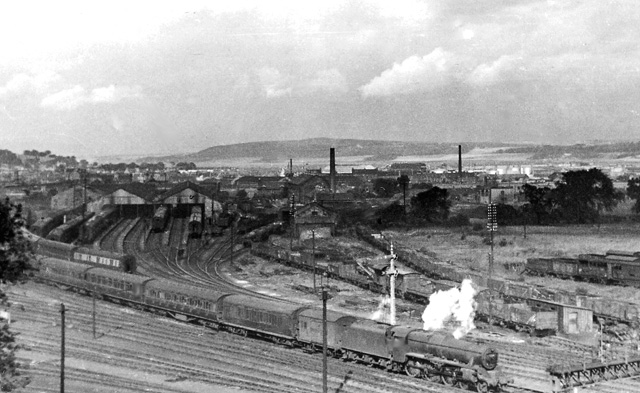
Inverness railway panorama (1948)

Inverness station was opened on 5 November 1855, as the western terminus of the Inverness and Nairn Railway to designs by the architect, Joseph Mitchell. It originally comprised a single covered passenger platform 200 feet (61 m) long, with three lines of rails: one for arrivals, one for departures and a spare line for carriages.

In 1857, the railway company erected a clock in front of the station facing Academy Street. This clock by Bryson & Sons, Princes Street, Edinburgh, was illuminated at night.

In 1865 the station was enlarged. The platform was lengthened to 300 feet (91 m) and a shed added which was 300 feet (91 m) long, 51 feet (16 m) wide and 20 feet (6.1 m) high. There were double lines for north and south traffic.

The platforms were extended again to 500 feet (150 m) and the platform roofs were extended in 1876 by Murdoch Paterson. The station platforms were lit by electricity for the first time in 1908.

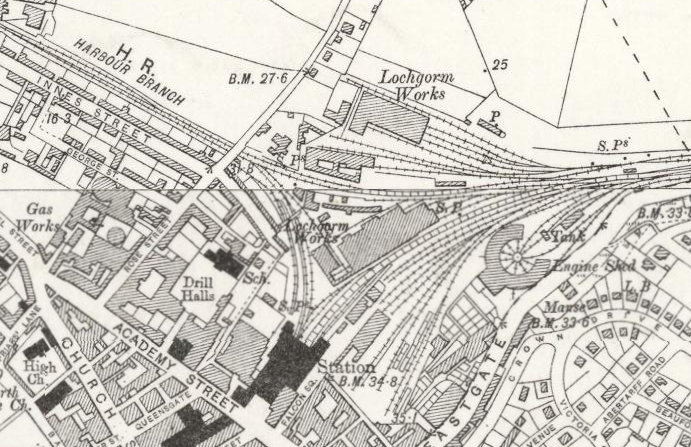
The station layout (1902)

In 1933, as part of an internal reorganisation, the London and North Eastern Railway closed its offices at the station and the staff relocated to Aberdeen.

Between 1966 and 1968, under British Rail, the station buildings were replaced; the new building was designed by Thomas Munro and Company.

A revamp of the station's frontage, forecourt and concourse by Mott Macdonald was planned to be completed by 2018; however, this was delayed. The nearby Royal Highland Hotel refused to give up their lease of parking spaces in front of the station. In early 2020, a large reconstruction project was announced to significantly reduce CO_{2} emissions in the city centre; it included the neighbouring Sports Direct and TK Maxx stores being purchased, as well as the former Royal Mail sorting office and car park. It was also announced that it would have fuelling for hydrogen vehicles and e-bike stations.

== Location ==
The station is located between three roads in the city centre: Falcon Square, Academy Street and Strothers Lane. It lies two minutes' walk from the Eastgate Shopping Centre, and approximately eight minutes from Inverness Castle and the Museum & Art Gallery. A taxi rank is situated on the corner of Academy Street and Falcon Square.

=== Rose Street Curve ===
This line is a rarely-used piece of track which avoids the station, linking the Far North and Kyle of Lochalsh lines to the Highland Main Line and the line to Aberdeen. In recent years, it has fallen into disuse but, up to 2019, it was used weekly on Saturdays by a train from Kyle of Lochalsh to Elgin. Such trains would not easily be visible from the station.

== Layout and facilities ==
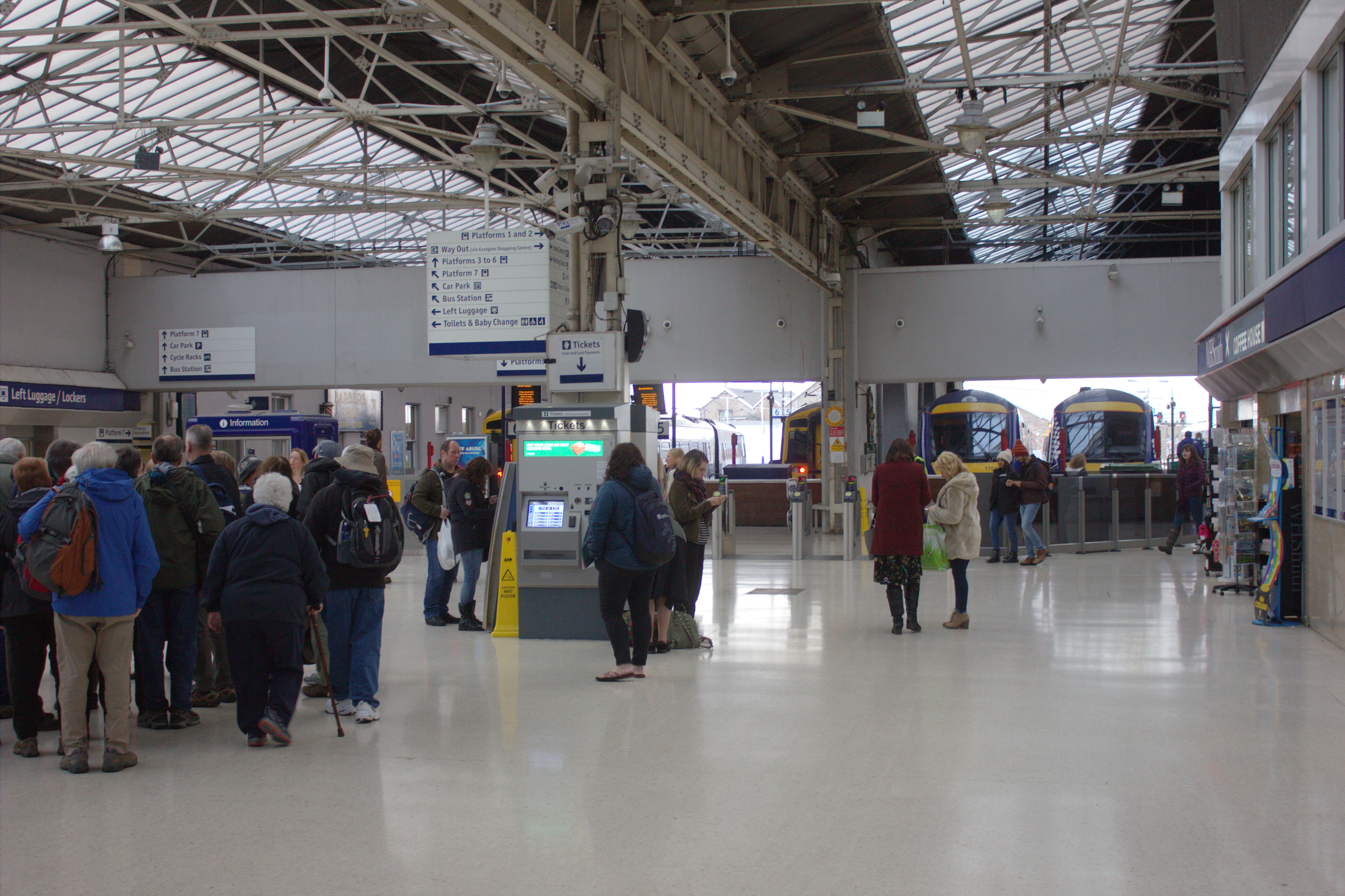
The main circulation area (2018)

Inverness is owned by Network Rail and operated by ScotRail, which runs most of the services using the station.

The station itself sits at one apex of a triangular junction in the centre of Inverness, with each half of the station connected to one line. The Highland Main and Aberdeen Lines both approach the station from the east and use Platforms 1–4, while the Far North Line (which also carries traffic heading for the Kyle Line) approaches from the north-west and use Platforms 5–7. Platform 5 also has a connection from the east side, but it is only usable by a two car train, and even then, it must not be in passenger service and movements from Platform 5 to the east line are not allowed. Platform 1 is long enough for a 13-coach train; platform 2 can hold 15 coaches; platforms 3 and 4, eight each; and platforms 5–7 will accommodate five coaches each.

Platform destination LED screens are installed, along with a main departures and arrivals information board. Each of platforms 1-7 has its own screen showing departures from that platform. Screens are also present behind the wall for all platforms from 3–6. In addition, several other screens are also visible for general information.

The main concourse is equipped with a ticket office and ticket machines, a barber shop, a bar, a cafe, toilets, a waiting room, a lost property office, a vending machine, a cash machine, payphones,help points and left luggage. The station has three car parks and step-free access.

== Passenger volume ==
Passenger Volume at Inverness
Period	Entries and exits	Interchanges
2004–05	822,928	47,630
2005–06	873,011	46,946
2006–07	915,840	48,316
2007–08	975,570	38,118
2008–09	1,043,712	45,242
2009–10	1,070,924	58,743
2010–11	1,127,718	60,693
2011–12	1,180,160	74,315
2012–13	1,213,382	78,009
2013–14	1,282,445	80,342
2014–15	1,303,662	72,055
2015–16	1,306,556	64,364
2016–17	1,259,496	61,948
2017–18	1,238,770	59,821
2018–19	1,243,338	61,433
2019–20	1,214,648	59,127
2020–21	231,894	9,422
2021–22	753,228	33,187
2022–23	974,808	38,939
2023–24	1,169,550	51,133
2024–25	1,172,640	54,976

The statistics cover twelve month periods that start in April.

== Services ==
Inverness is served by the following Monday–Saturday off-peak service, in trains per hour/day (tph/tpd):

ScotRail

- 5 tpd to Glasgow Queen Street, via Aviemore, Perth and Stirling
- 5 tpd to Edinburgh Waverley, via Aviemore, Perth and Stirling
- 1-2 tph to Aberdeen, via Elgin
- 1-2 tph to Elgin, via Nairn
- 4 tpd to Dingwall; of which:
  - 1 tpd extends to Invergordon
  - 1 tpd extends to Tain
  - 1 tpd extends to Ardgay
- 4 tpd to Wick, via Dingwall, Georgemas Junction and Thurso
- 4 tpd to Kyle of Lochalsh, via Dingwall and Strathcarron.

London North Eastern Railway

- 1 tpd to London King's Cross, via Falkirk Grahamston, Edinburgh Waverley, Newcastle and York (the Highland Chieftain).

Caledonian Sleeper

- 1 tpd to London Euston, via Preston and Crewe; it does not operate on Saturday nights.

Preceding station	National Rail	Following station
Aviemore or Carrbridge (Sunday southbound only)	London North Eastern Railway; London Kings Cross – Inverness (Highland Chieftain)	Terminus
Carrbridge or Aviemore	ScotRail; Highland Main Line	Terminus or Inverness Airport (Sundays only)
Inverness Airport	ScotRail; Aberdeen–Inverness line	Terminus
Beauly or Muir of Ord	ScotRail; Far North Line; Kyle of Lochalsh line	Terminus
Aviemore or Carrbridge	Caledonian Sleeper; Highland Caledonian Sleeper (London Euston – Inverness)	Terminus
	Historical railways	
Culloden Moor; Line open; station closed	Highland Railway; Inverness and Aviemore Direct Railway	Terminus
Allanfearn; Line open; station closed	Highland Railway; Inverness and Nairn Railway	Terminus
Clachnaharry; Line open; station closed	Highland Railway; Inverness and Ross-shire Railway	Terminus

== Onward connections ==
Inverness bus station is located in Margaret Street, 150 metres (492 ft) north-west of the station. Many services can also be joined at the stop on Millburn Road outside Marks and Spencer, closer to the station.

Aside from local buses, there are also long-distance coach services which allow rail passengers to continue their journey to areas of the Highlands that are not on the rail network:

- Scottish Citylink's route 961 operates two daily return services to Ullapool to connect with Caledonian MacBrayne ferry sailings to Stornoway on the Isle of Lewis. Rail passengers may also connect with this bus at Garve on the Kyle of Lochalsh line, but the timings are not so convenient.
- Scottish Citylink's route 919 operates six daily return services down the Great Glen to Fort William, calling at Urquhart Castle, Fort Augustus and intermediate points. Two of these services allow onward connections with Citylink route 918 from Fort William to Oban.
- Stagecoach Highlands' route 11 runs every 30 minutes between the city centre and Inverness Airport. The bus leaves from Strothers Lane, just around the corner from the station; the journey time is 25 minutes.

== Bibliography ==
- Brailsford, Martyn, ed. (December 2017) [1987]. Railway Track Diagrams 1: Scotland & Isle of Man (6th ed.). Frome: Trackmaps. ISBN 978-0-9549866-9-8.
- Butt, R. V. J. (October 1995). The Directory of Railway Stations: details every public and private passenger station, halt, platform and stopping place, past and present (1st ed.). Sparkford: Patrick Stephens Ltd. ISBN 978-1-85260-508-7. OCLC 60251199. OL 11956311M.
- Jowett, Alan (March 1989). Jowett's Railway Atlas of Great Britain and Ireland: From Pre-Grouping to the Present Day (1st ed.). Sparkford: Patrick Stephens Ltd. ISBN 978-1-85260-086-0. OCLC 22311137.
- Jowett, Alan (2000). Jowett's Nationalised Railway Atlas (1st ed.). Penryn, Cornwall: Atlantic Transport Publishers. ISBN 978-0-906899-99-1. OCLC 228266687.
