= Eastgate Shopping Centre (Inverness) =

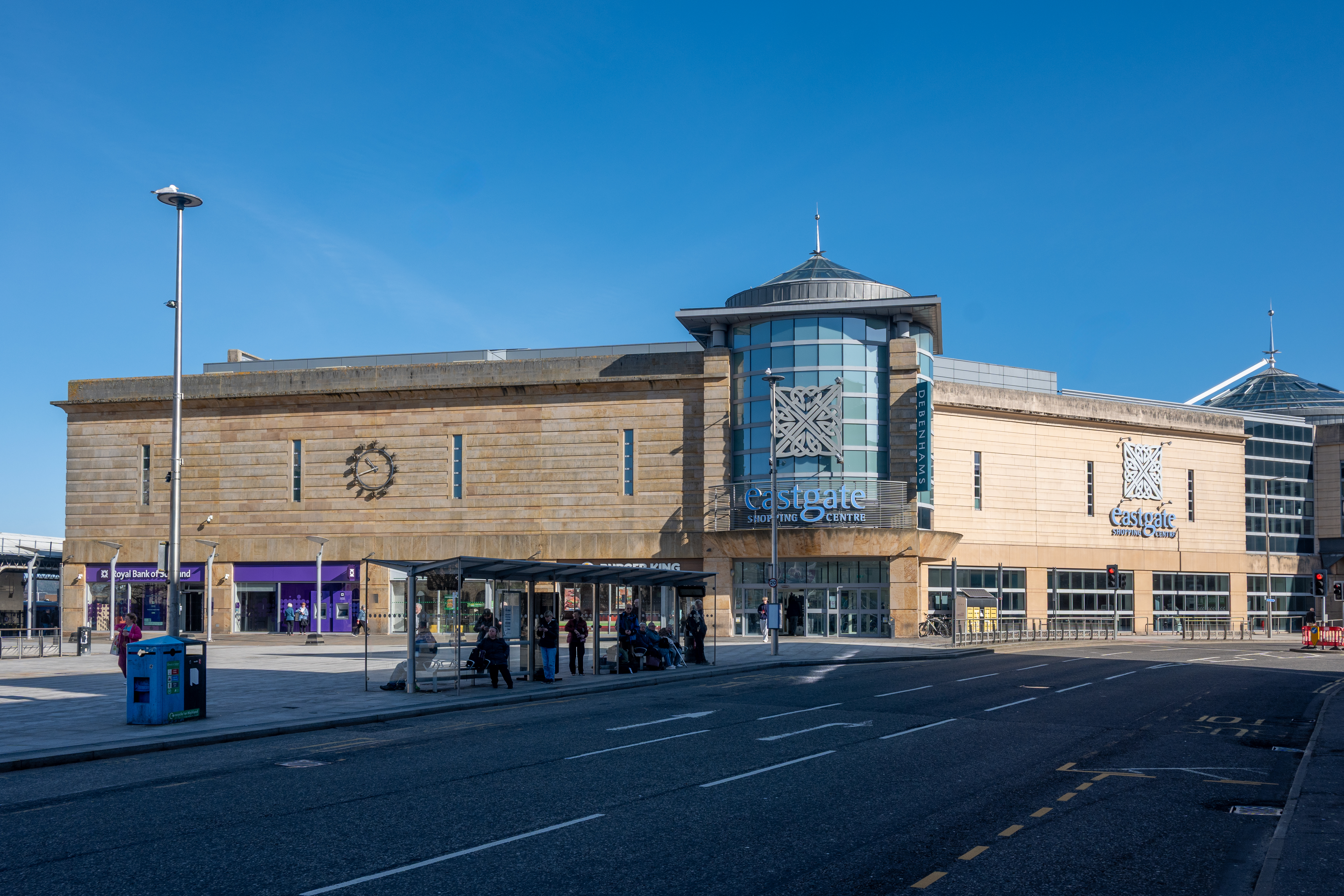
- Location: Inverness, Highland, Scotland
- Coordinates: 57°28′44″N 4°13′14″W
- Address: 11 Eastgate Inverness IV2 3PP
- Opened: 1983; 1993 (refurbishment); 2003 (extension)
- Developer: Sun & Alliance
- Manager: Savills
- Num. of stores: 60
- Num. of anchor tenants: 2
- Floor area: 144,000 sq ft (13,400 m^{2})
- Parking: 1350 spaces
- Website: www.eastgateshopping.co.uk/index.php

Eastgate Shopping Centre is located in Inverness, serving the largest shopping catchment area in the United Kingdom.

The Eastgate shopping centre in Inverness has been taken over by UK-owned real estate company, Savills plc. The centre is a popular destination amongst locals and tourists alike.

== History ==
=== Eastgate development ===
The Eastgate shopping centre was first opened in the city centre by Sun Alliance in January 1983.

=== Eastgate refurbishment ===
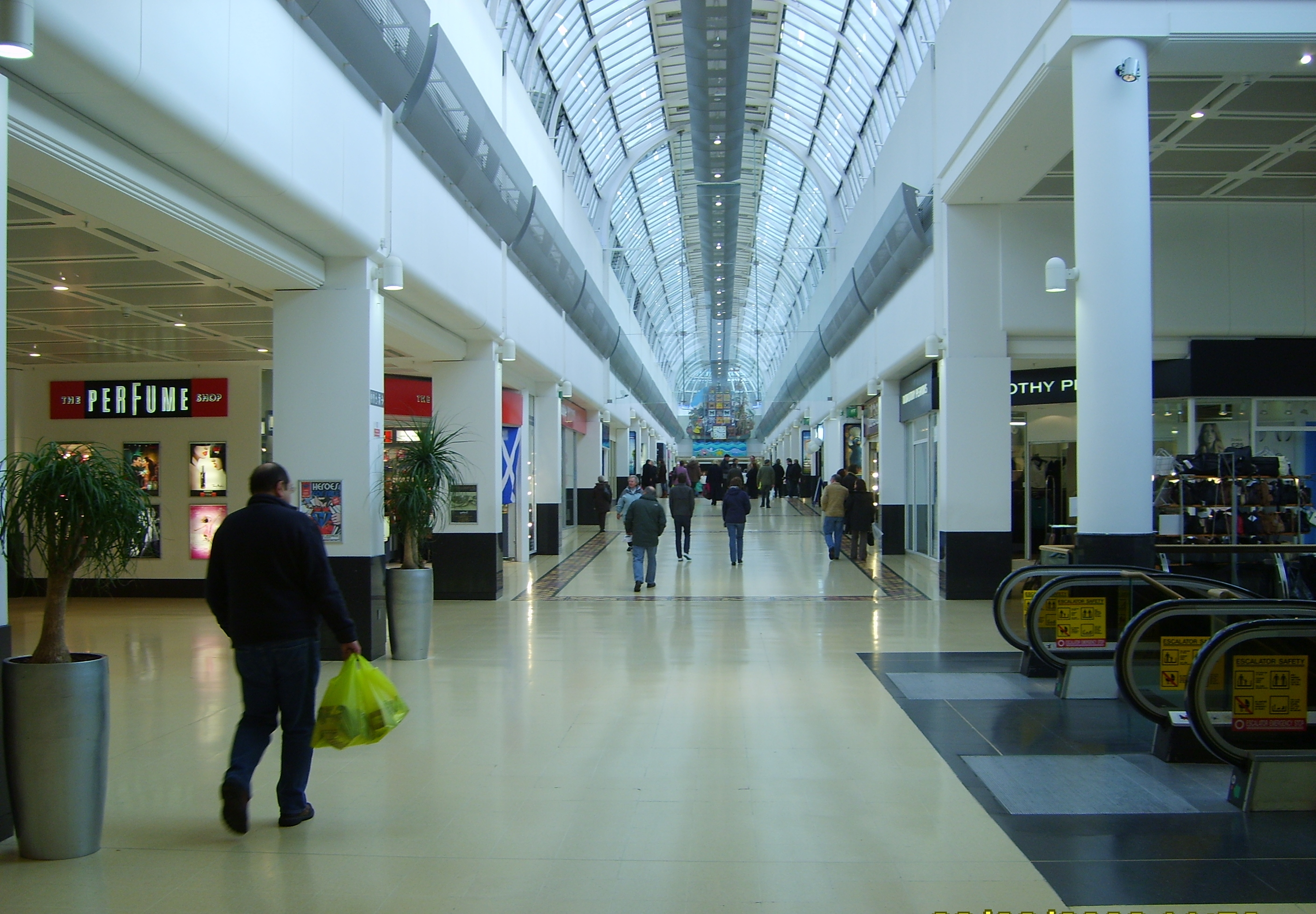
Interior view of the shopping centre

The Eastgate shopping centre underwent a refurbishment plan in 1993.

The first application sent to Highland Council by the centre developers Royal & SunAlliance, dated 10 March 1997, was to warrant a much needed extension to the Eastgate. This plan was originally rejected on the grounds of the controversial re-location of the Category B listed building on 7/9 Falcon Square (the Falconer Building), inadequate access to the railway station and too many car park spaces that would allow for this development to go ahead. They were more interested in supporting plans particularly around The Academy Centre extension which was going to be anchored by Debenhams.

The plans outlined were going to contain two new bridges connecting the existing centre and the new extension. This was going to be built on land (Millburn Road), north of the centre on the former Railway goods yard area. Marks and Spencer were going to expand their current store over their own service yard. A car park would be built for the extension holding 1500, which was later forced to scale back, creating 1350 spaces across the two centre car parks. BHS anticipated an interest in being an anchor for the new extension, which also included including room for leisure facility and an 8 screen multiplex cinema.

A later application was accepted, although now without a multiplex cinema. The listed building was moved brick-by-brick to the other side of Falcon Square, and now hosts Pizza Express and Laura Ashley. Building work started in 2001 and was opened in 2003. This new development included two bridge walkways connecting the new phase with the existing shopping centre, complete with Debenhams as the anchor store, and a new food court. The expansion of Eastgate and the construction of the Falcon Mall was deemed one of 'the most impressive planning projects in Scotland in recent years' and was the overall winner of the Scottish Awards for Quality in Planning 2003.

The Falcon Square extension is called the Falcon Mall. The original site is now officially called Eastgate Mall, with Eastgate Centre referring to the three buildings together(Morrisons included). As part of this refurbishment, Falcon Square has been rebuilt as a plaza on which a new mercat cross has been erected, and which has replaced the Town House end of the High Street as a gathering point for civic events.

== Culture ==
The Eastgate Centre is notable for an automation clock, which depicts Noah's Ark. This clock is popular among tourists and locals. The clock is one of only six of its kind in the UK. The clock was assembled by Haward Horological Ltd, a Suffolk-based clockmaker.

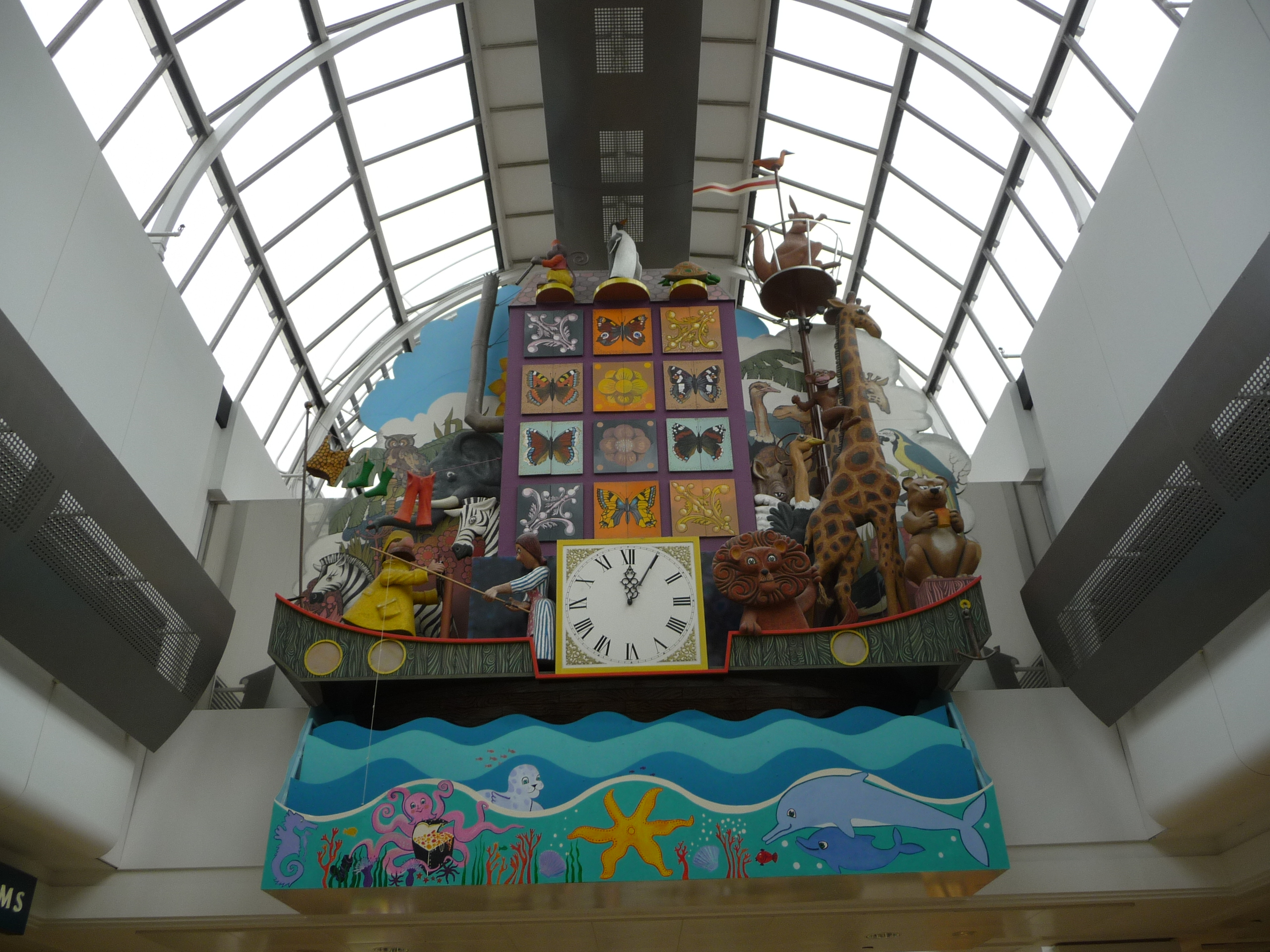
The Noah’s Ark Clock on the older half of the Eastgate building

The food court in Falcon Mall is home to The Falcon's Return, a statue depicting James IV of Scotland holding a falcon, as James IV was one of Scotland's celebrated Falconers. The statue also celebrates the name of the Falcon Ironworks that originally stood on the site of the Eastgate expansion, which gave its name to Falcon Square. The sculpture was created by local artist Leonie Gibbs. The Duchess of York, Sarah Ferguson, was present at the unveiling ceremony, and she and Gibbs are cousins.
