= Wick railway station =

Railway station in Highland, Scotland

Wick Scottish Gaelic: Inbhir Ùige
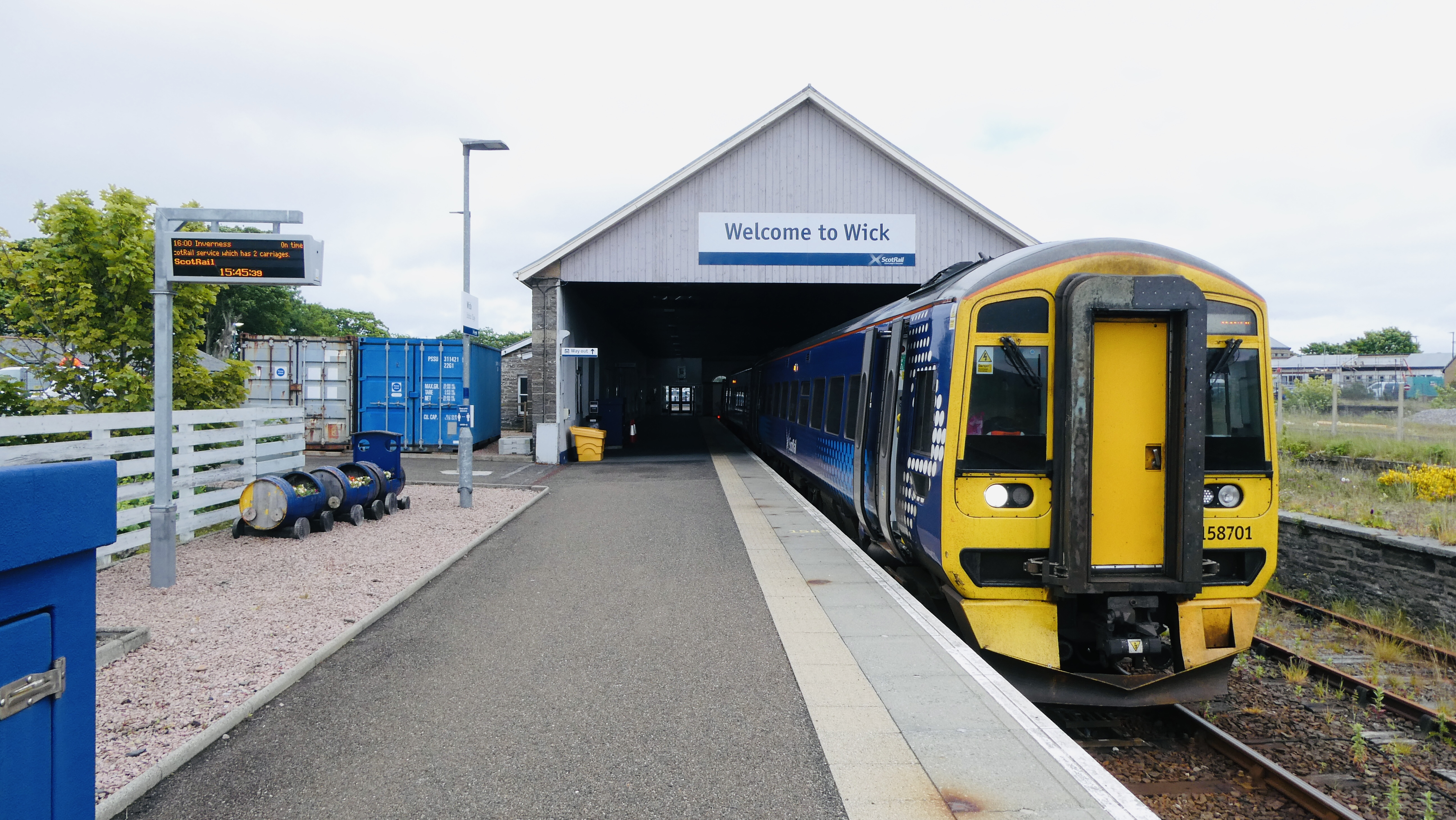
- 158701 standing at Wick

General information
- Location: Wick, Highland; Scotland
- Coordinates: 58.4416°N 3.0975°W
- Grid reference: ND360509
- Manager: ScotRail
- Platforms: 1

Other information
- Station code: WCK

History
- Opened: 28 July 1874; 152 years ago
- Original company: Sutherland and Caithness Railway
- Pre-grouping: Highland Railway
- Post-grouping: LMS

Passengers
- 2021/22: ▲12,980
- 2022/23: ▲14,924
- 2023/24: ▲16,726
- 2024/25: ▼16,046
- 2025/26: ▼14,026

Listed Building – Category B
- Designated: 28 November 1984 (amended 15 December 1998)
- Reference no.: LB42321
Location
Notes
- Passenger statistics from the Office of Rail and Road

Wick railway station is a railway station located in Wick, in the Highland council area in the far north of Scotland. It serves the town of Wick and other surrounding areas in the historic county of Caithness, including Staxigoe, Papigoe and Haster. The station is the terminus of the Far North Line, 161 miles 36 chains (259.8 kilometres) from Inverness. It is managed by ScotRail, who operate all trains serving the station.

== History ==
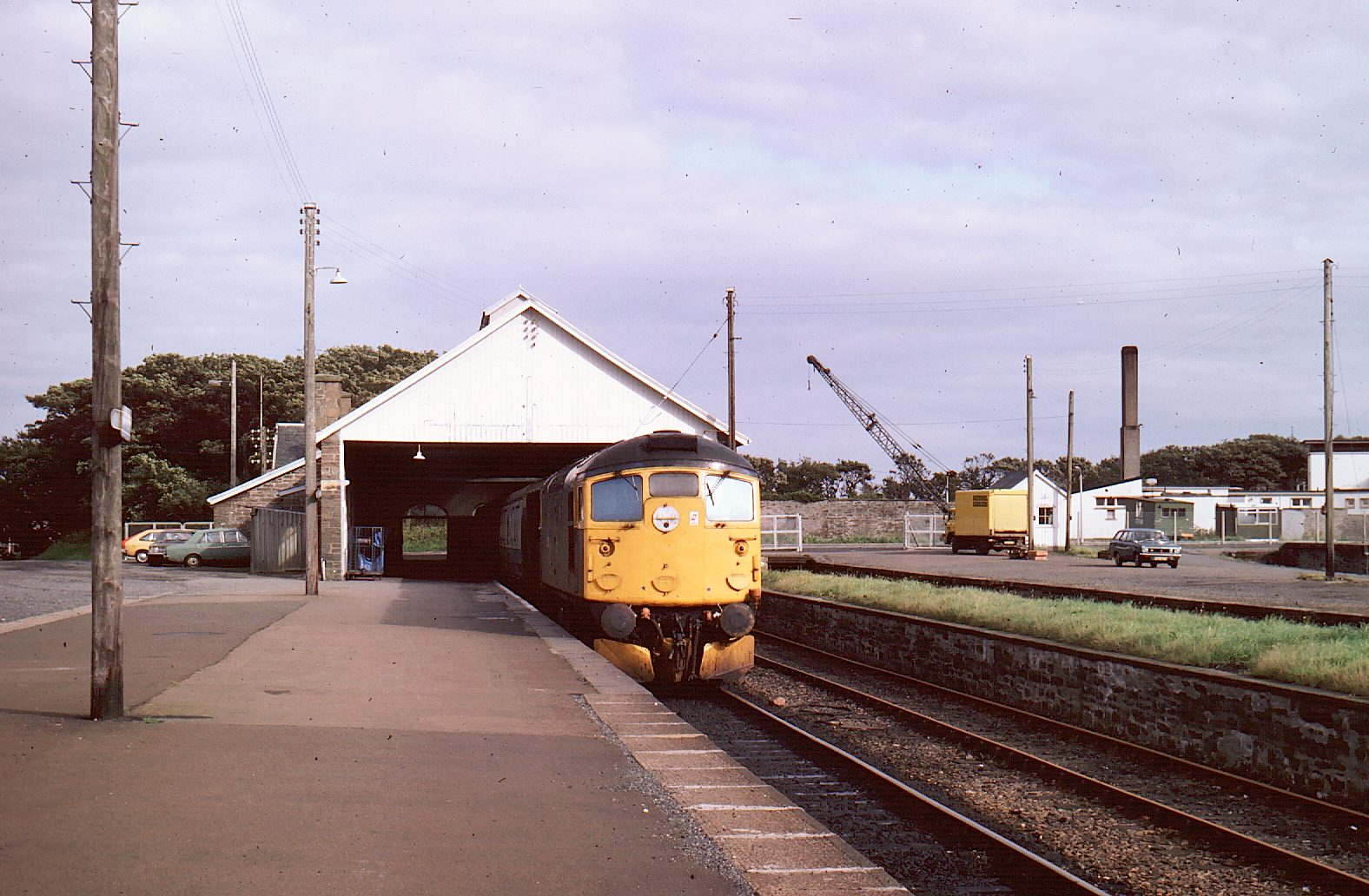
Wick station in August 1980.

The station was designed by Murdoch Paterson and built by the Sutherland and Caithness Railway, opening the line in 1874. A wrought-iron turntable, 45 feet (14 m) in diameter, was installed at the station by the Railway Steel and Plant Company of Manchester, along with an engine shed capable of housing four engines and a special loading bank for the loading of herring for the southern markets.

On 1 July 1903, the Wick and Lybster Light Railway was opened, and Wick became a junction station. The last trains to Lybster ran in 1944, although the line was not officially closed until 1951.

Until 2000, trains from Inverness would split in half at Georgemas Junction, with one portion going to Wick and the other to Thurso. This practice ended when Class 158s were introduced on the line – since then all services run in full between Inverness and Wick via Thurso, in both directions, adding up to 30 minutes to journey times to and from Wick.

Queen Elizabeth II and Prince Philip visited the station in 2002, as part of a tour for Elizabeth's Golden Jubilee.

=== Accidents and incidents ===
On 30 June 1909, Peter Doull, a coal trimmer, was killed by a train in the coal siding.

On 3 May 1941, a goods train pulling into the station collided with an empty carriage at the platform. The buffers failed to stop the carriage, which carried forward and piled up onto the platform, where one end crashed into the Menzies bookstall. The platform buffers were found buried beneath the wreckage of the bookstall.

== Location ==
The station lies adjacent to Caithness General Hospital and Wick police station; it is also the nearest station to Wick Airport (about 1.1 miles (1.8 km) to the north) and to the village of John o' Groats (approximately 17 miles (27 km) to the north) at the northeastern tip of mainland Britain.

== Facilities ==
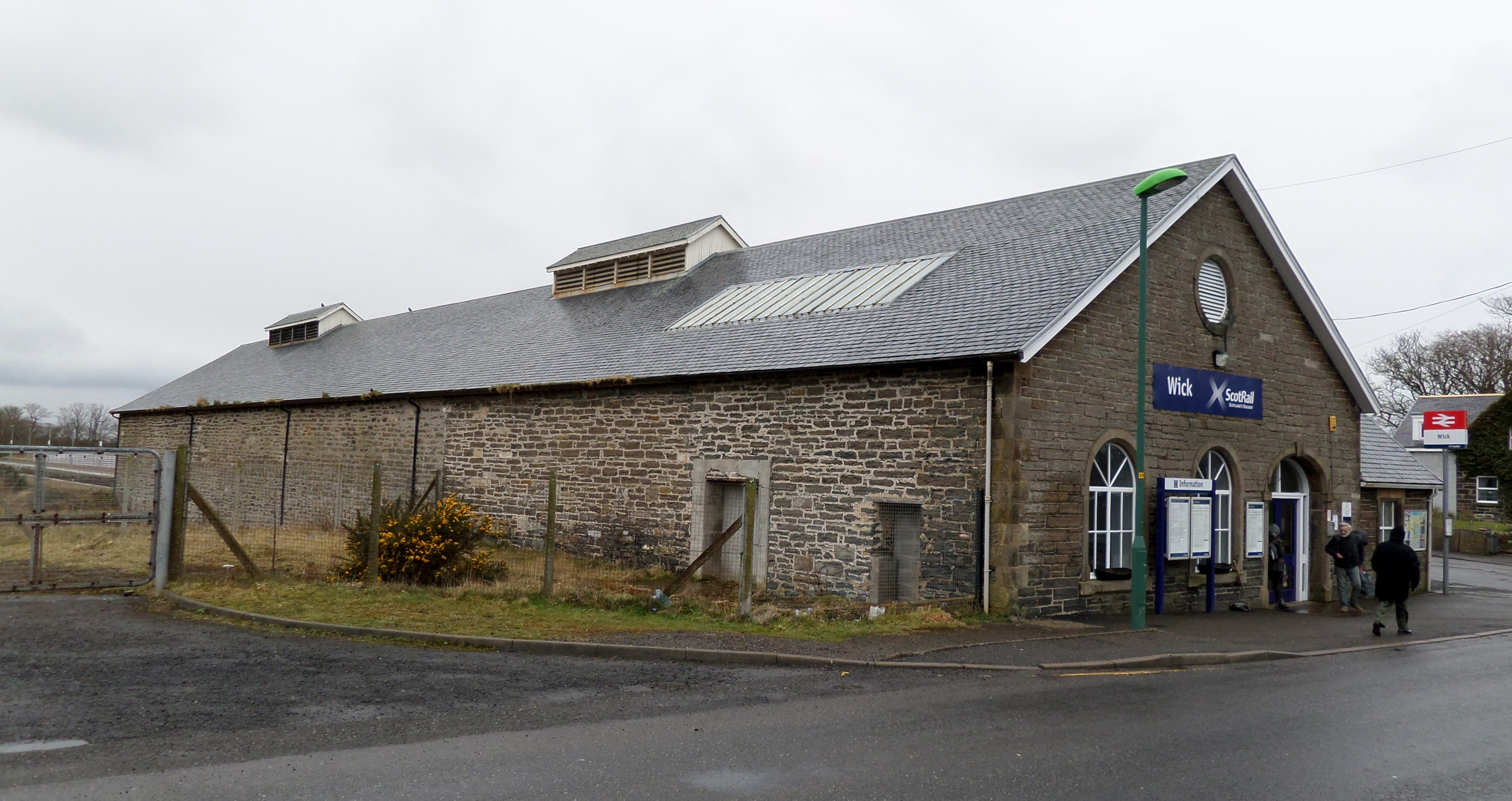
Wick station building

The station has a single platform, which is long enough to accommodate a ten-carriage train. The station is fully wheelchair-accessible, but it is not monitored by CCTV.

The station has a ticket office, staffed between 10:10 and 17:15 every day except Sundays. There are no self-service ticket machines or smartcard top-up facilities, although there are smartcard validators. Other facilities include: a free car park with 12 parking spaces, a sheltered bike stand with 10 spaces, a payphone that accepts both cash and card, waiting rooms with designated seating areas, toilets (only open during staffing hours), a post box and LED Departure board.

There is no bus stop located directly outside the station.

== Passenger volume ==
Passenger Volume at Wick
	2004–05	2005–06	2006–07	2007–08	2008–09	2009–10	2010–11	2011–12	2012–13	2013–14	2014–15	2015–16	2016–17	2017–18	2018–19	2019–20	2020–21	2021–22	2022–23	2023–24	2024–25
Entries and exits	19,582	19,079	17,321	20,202	21,708	24,454	25,666	24,838	22,788	21,884	21,442	19,766	18,438	17,546	17,890	16,664	3,442	12,980	14,924	16,726	16,046

The statistics cover twelve month periods that start in April.

== Services ==
On weekdays and Saturdays Wick station receives four trains per day in each direction, to and from Inverness (via Thurso, Helmsdale, Golspie, Lairg, Tain and Dingwall). On Sundays this drops to just one train per day each way.

Preceding station	National Rail	Following station
Georgemas Junction	ScotRail; Far North Line	Terminus
	Historical railways	
Bilbster; Line open, station closed	Highland Railway; Sutherland and Caithness Railway	Terminus
	Disused railways	
Thrumster; Line and station closed	Highland Railway; Wick and Lybster Railway	Terminus

== Cultural references ==
On 19 August 2017, Geoff Marshall and Vicki Pipe, presenters of the documentary series All the Stations, completed their 14-week journey at Wick, having started at Penzance on 7 May 2017. That marked the end of their successful project to visit all 2,563 railway stations in Great Britain.

At the end of the novel Britannia's Innocent by Antoine Vanner, the book's hero Nicholas Dawlish is taken to Wick in May 1864 after having taken part in the Battle of Heligoland (1864). He is told: "there's a railway station there. Regular daily trains to the south." He will have had a rather long wait, since the line did not open till more than ten years later.

== Bibliography ==
- Brailsford, Martyn, ed. (December 2017) [1987]. Railway Track Diagrams 1: Scotland & Isle of Man (6th ed.). Frome: Trackmaps. ISBN 978-0-9549866-9-8.
- Vallance, H.A. (December 1966). "The Northern Highland Lines Today, Part two: Inverness to Wick viewed from the cab of a type "2"". Railway Magazine. Vol. 112, no. 788. pp. 681–685.
- Butt, R. V. J. (October 1995). The Directory of Railway Stations: details every public and private passenger station, halt, platform and stopping place, past and present (1st ed.). Sparkford: Patrick Stephens Ltd. ISBN 978-1-85260-508-7. OCLC 60251199. OL 11956311M.
- Jowett, Alan (March 1989). Jowett's Railway Atlas of Great Britain and Ireland: From Pre-Grouping to the Present Day (1st ed.). Sparkford: Patrick Stephens Ltd. ISBN 978-1-85260-086-0. OCLC 22311137.
- Jowett, Alan (2000). Jowett's Nationalised Railway Atlas (1st ed.). Penryn, Cornwall: Atlantic Transport Publishers. ISBN 978-0-906899-99-1. OCLC 228266687.
- ScotRail North Highlands Timetable
