= Bilbster railway station =

Disused railway station in Highland, Scotland

Bilbster
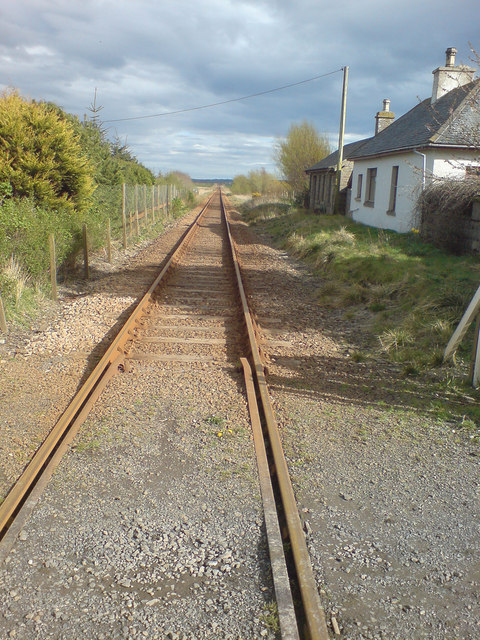

General information
- Location: Bilbster, Highland; Scotland
- Coordinates: 58.4702°N 3.2233°W
- Grid reference: ND286541
- Platforms: 1

Other information
- Status: Disused

History
- Original company: Sutherland and Caithness Railway
- Pre-grouping: Highland Railway

Key dates
- 28 July 1874: Opened
- 13 June 1960: Closed
Location

Bilbster was a railway station located in the village of Bilbster, in the Highlands region of Scotland.

The station opened on 28 July 1874. The station buildings were destroyed by fire on 16 September 1877.

It was one of a number of smaller stations on the Far North Line which were closed in 1960.

== Sources ==
- Butt, R. V. J. (October 1995). The Directory of Railway Stations: details every public and private passenger station, halt, platform and stopping place, past and present (1st ed.). Sparkford: Patrick Stephens Ltd. ISBN 978-1-85260-508-7. OCLC 60251199. OL 11956311M.
- Jowett, Alan (March 1989). Jowett's Railway Atlas of Great Britain and Ireland: From Pre-Grouping to the Present Day (1st ed.). Sparkford: Patrick Stephens Ltd. ISBN 978-1-85260-086-0. OCLC 22311137.

Preceding station	Historical railways	Following station
Watten; Station closed; Line open	Highland Railway; Sutherland and Caithness Railway	Wick; Station and Line open
