= Thurso railway station =

Railway station in Highland, Scotland

Thurso Scottish Gaelic: Inbhir Theòrsa
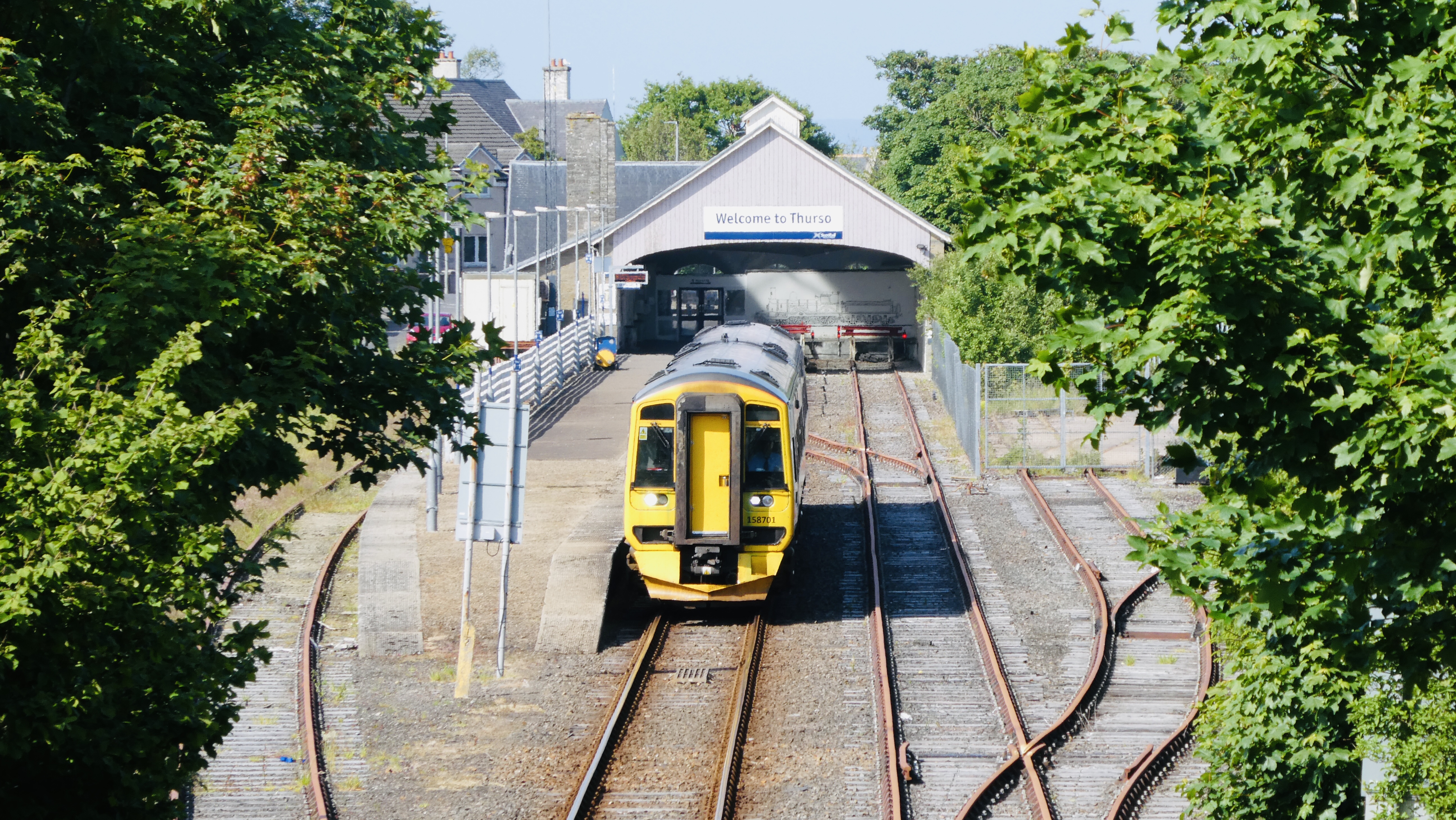
- 158701 departing Thurso bound for Inverness

General information
- Location: Thurso, Highland; Scotland
- Coordinates: 58.5900°N 3.5278°W
- Grid reference: ND112679
- Manager: ScotRail
- Platforms: 1

Other information
- Station code: THS

History
- Original company: Sutherland and Caithness Railway
- Pre-grouping: Highland Railway
- Post-grouping: LMS

Key dates
- 28 July 1874: Opened

Passengers
- 2021/22: ▲25,200
- 2022/23: ▲31,446
- 2023/24: ▲37,626
- 2024/25: ▼36,980
- 2025/26: ▼33,398

Listed Building – Category B
- Designated: 28 November 1984 (amended 15 December 1998)
- Reference no.: Historic Scotland Building ID 42035
Location
Notes
- Passenger statistics from the Office of Rail and Road

Thurso railway station is a railway station located in Thurso, in the Highland council area in the far north of Scotland. It serves the town and its surrounding areas, along with ferry services linking the mainland with Stromness on the Orkney Islands.

The station, opened in 1874 by the Sutherland and Caithness Railway, is the terminus of a branch line off the Far North Line. It is not the terminus for passenger services on the line, which instead extend to Wick. It is the northernmost station on mainland Britain's National Rail network and is managed by ScotRail, which operates all services to the station.

== History ==
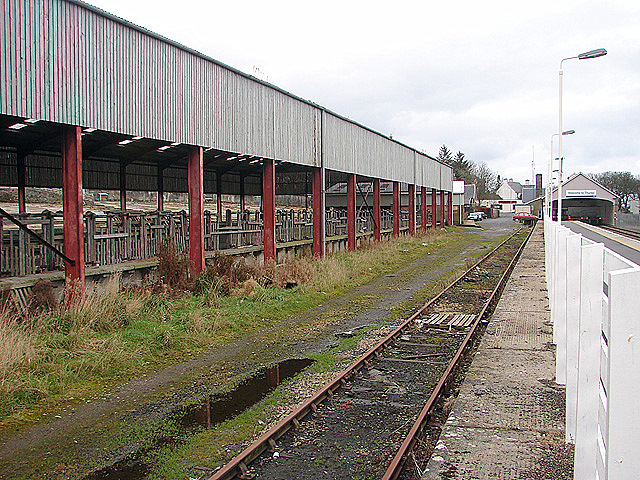
The disused goods line, seen in 2007

There were plans for a railway to Thurso as early as the 1860s, but funding could not be obtained for its construction. In 1870, a survey was conducted and land was offered in Thurso, to begin the funding process. The station was built and opened with the rest of the Sutherland and Caithness Railway on 28 July 1874 after a special train ran to inspect the station and the line on 25 July. Despite being the northernmost station on the line, Thurso was not built as the terminus for passenger services, with trains instead reversing and continuing further east to Wick. This was necessary due to the difficult terrain, including a hill and a valley, which would have been encountered if the railway decided to take the most direct route to Wick by following the existing road.

Thurso was built with a single platform, a goods line at the rear platform face, and a small goods yard and engine shed. A wrought-iron turntable, 45 feet (14 m) in diameter, was built at the station by the Railway Steel and Plant Company of Manchester.

Along with passenger services, the station has also seen some goods traffic. Its connection to the Orkney Islands played an important role in both World War I and World War II, with trains carrying soldiers and goods bound for Scapa Flow. Before the Dounreay nuclear site was constructed, Thurso station was surveyed for the possibility of extending the line towards the site. However, an extension was considered more likely to originate from Forsinard, which is off the Thurso branch line. The extension was never built, and materials were transported to Thurso station instead.

The turntable was removed in the mid-1950s, and the engine shed was removed prior to the introduction of diesel services in May 1961. The station roof was refurbished in 1999, prior to the introduction of services operated by Class 158 trains.

== Location and facilities ==
The station is situated at the end of a short branch line off the Far North Line. It is 6 miles 50 chains (10.7 km) down the line from the start of the branch at Georgemas Junction, and 153 miles 70 chains (247.6 km) from Inverness.

Thurso has a single platform, which is long enough to accommodate a nine-carriage train. It is fully wheelchair-accessible, has a part-time ticket office and LED Departure board. There is also a small car park, waiting rooms, and toilets.

== Passenger volume ==
Passenger Volume at Thurso
	2004–05	2005–06	2006–07	2007–08	2008–09	2009–10	2010–11	2011–12	2012–13	2013–14	2014–15	2015–16	2016–17	2017–18	2018–19	2019–20	2020–21	2021–22	2022–23	2023–24	2024–25
Entries and exits	37,338	35,083	32,906	37,064	43,450	47,792	48,172	48,090	46,024	43,802	42,082	38,426	37,322	39,174	39,974	39,702	6,474	25,200	31,446	37,626	36,980

The statistics cover twelve month periods that start in April.

== Services ==
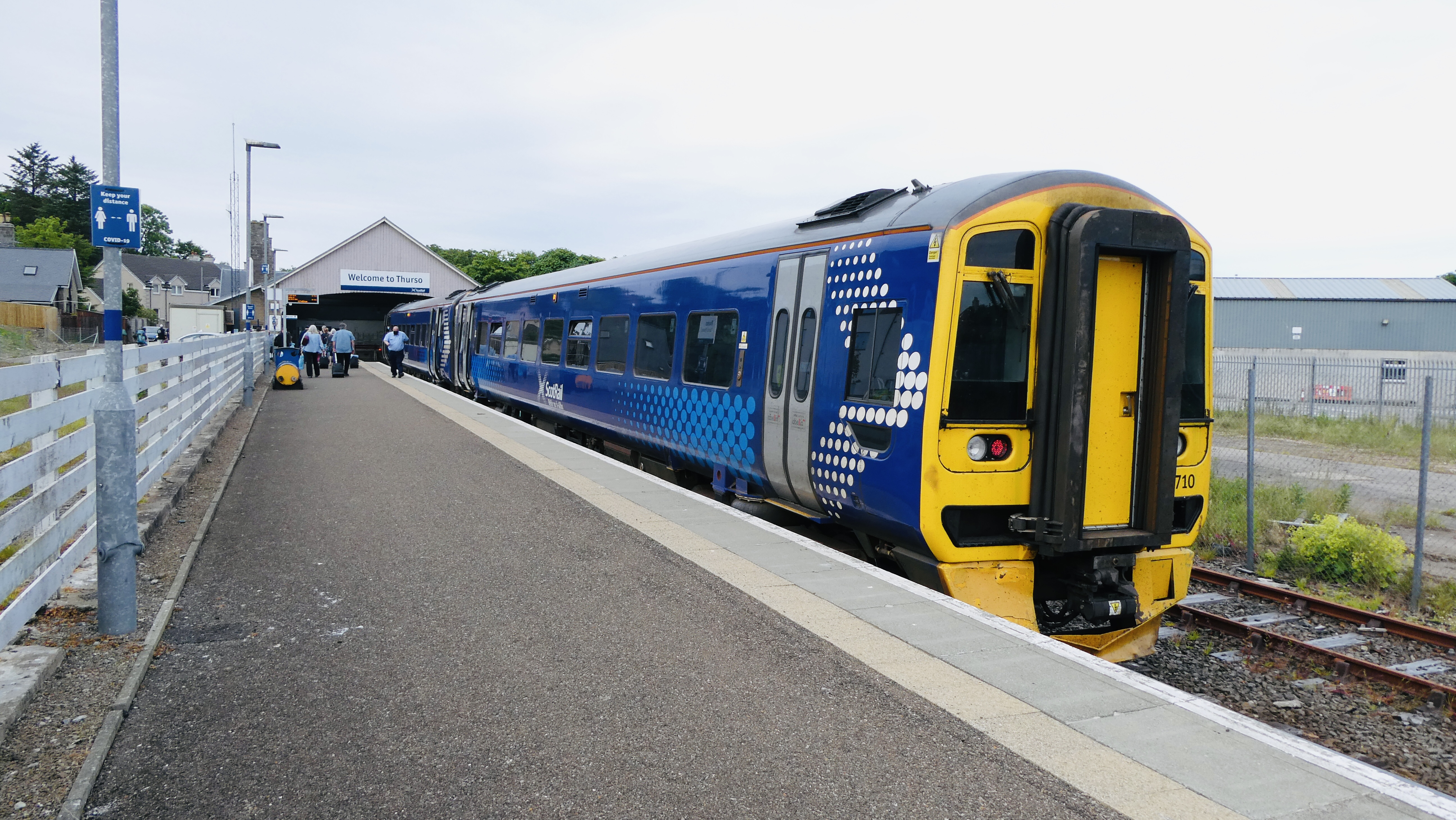
A passenger train at the station

As of the May 2026 timetable, the station is served by eight trains per day to Georgemas Junction on weekdays and Saturdays, of which four continue to Inverness (via Helmsdale, Golspie, Lairg, Tain and Dingwall), and four continue to Wick. On Sundays the frequency drops to two trains per day to Georgemas Junction, of which one goes to Inverness and one to Wick.

Preceding station	National Rail	Following station
Georgemas Junction	ScotRail; Far North Line	Georgemas Junction
	Historical railways	
Hoy; Line open, station closed	Highland Railway; Sutherland and Caithness Railway; Thurso Branch	Terminus

== Bibliography ==
- Brailsford, Martyn, ed. (December 2017) [1987]. Railway Track Diagrams 1: Scotland & Isle of Man (6th ed.). Frome: Trackmaps. ISBN 978-0-9549866-9-8.
