= Bower railway station =

Disused railway station in Highland, Scotland

Bower
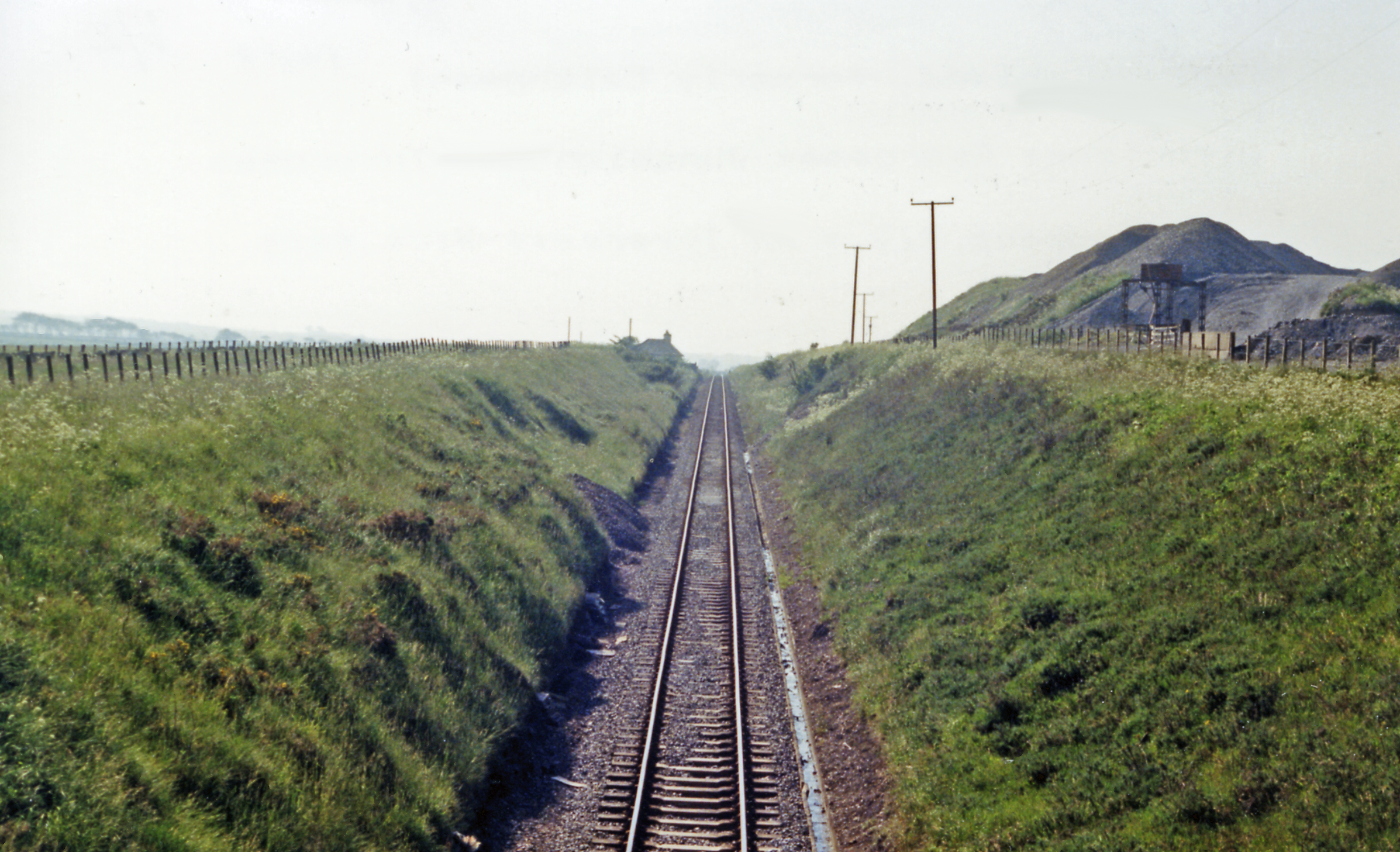
- The site of the station in 1986

General information
- Location: Loch Scarmclate, Highland; Scotland
- Coordinates: 58.5072°N 3.3769°W
- Grid reference: ND198585
- Platforms: 1

Other information
- Status: Disused

History
- Original company: Sutherland and Caithness Railway
- Pre-grouping: Highland Railway

Key dates
- 28 July 1874: Opened
- 13 June 1960: Closed to passengers
- 18 May 1964: Closed to goods
Location

Bower was a railway station located near Loch Scarmclate, Highland between Halkirk and Wick.

The station opened on 28 July 1874. It was one of a number of smaller stations on the Far North Line which were closed in 1960.

Preceding station	Historical railways	Following station
Georgemas Junction; Station and Line open	Highland Railway; Sutherland and Caithness Railway	Watten; Station closed; Line open
