= Halkirk railway station =

Disused railway station in Highland, Scotland

Halkirk
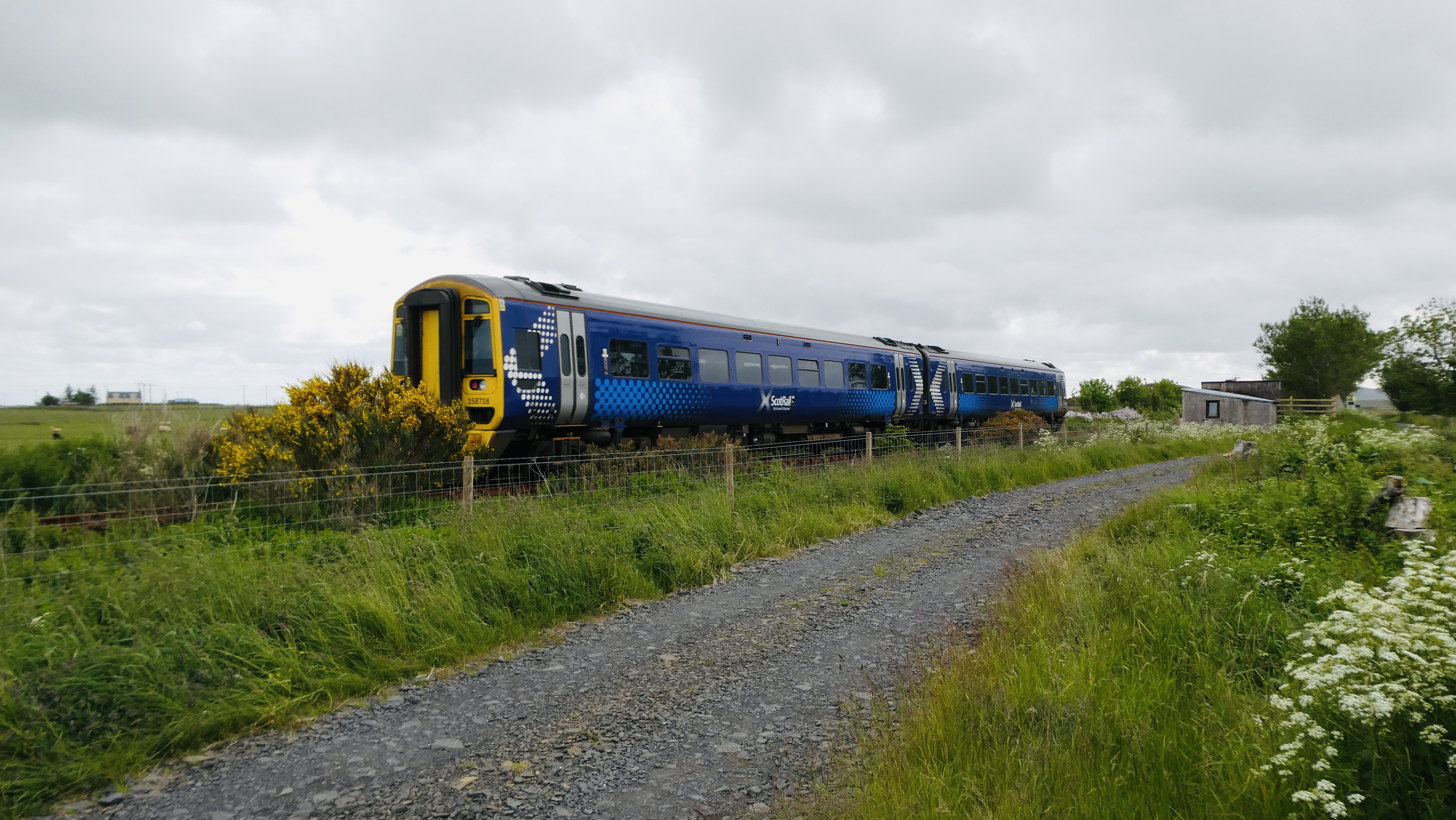
- 158718 passing through the former station site, looking south towards Inverness.

General information
- Location: Halkirk, Highland; Scotland
- Coordinates: 58.5050°N 3.4888°W
- Grid reference: ND132583
- Platforms: 1

Other information
- Status: Disused

History
- Original company: Sutherland and Caithness Railway
- Pre-grouping: Highland Railway

Key dates
- 28 July 1874: Opened
- 13 June 1960: Closed
Location

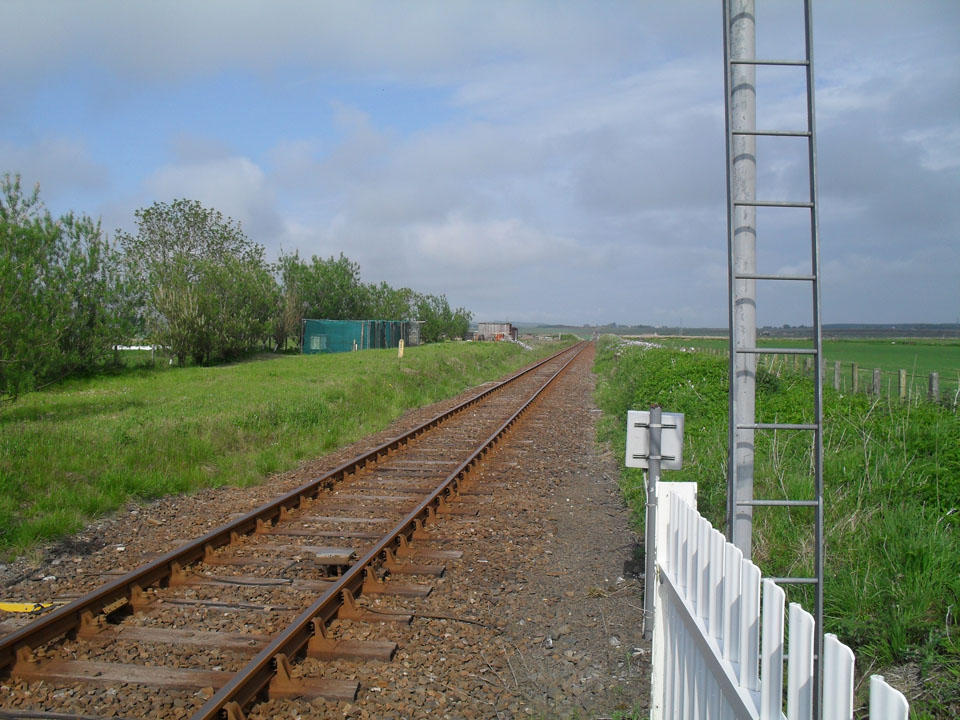
Site of Halkirk station, 2010

Halkirk was a railway station located on the southern edge of the village of Halkirk, in Caithness in the Highland council area.

The station opened on 28 July 1874. It was one of a number of smaller stations on the Far North Line which were closed in 1960. Georgemas Junction station, situated 1.2 miles (2 km) to the north-east, remains open.

Preceding station	Historical railways	Following station
Scotscalder; Station and Line open	Highland Railway; Sutherland and Caithness Railway	Georgemas Junction; Station and Line open
