= Sutherland and Caithness Railway =

UK railway company

Overview
- Locale: Scotland
- Dates of operation: 28 July 1874–30 July 1884
- Successor: Highland Railway

Technical
- Track gauge: 4 ft 8 1/2 in (1,435 mm)

The Sutherland and Caithness Railway was a Scottish railway company that built a line from Helmsdale, the terminus of the Duke of Sutherland's Railway to Wick and Thurso in Caithness, giving the northern towns access to Inverness. It was driven through by the efforts of the 3rd Duke of Sutherland and the engineer Joseph Mitchell in the face of apathy from interests in Wick.

Its roundabout route was forced by the difficult topography north of Helmsdale. It opened in 1874 and continues in use at the present day as the northern part of the Far North Line.

== Background ==
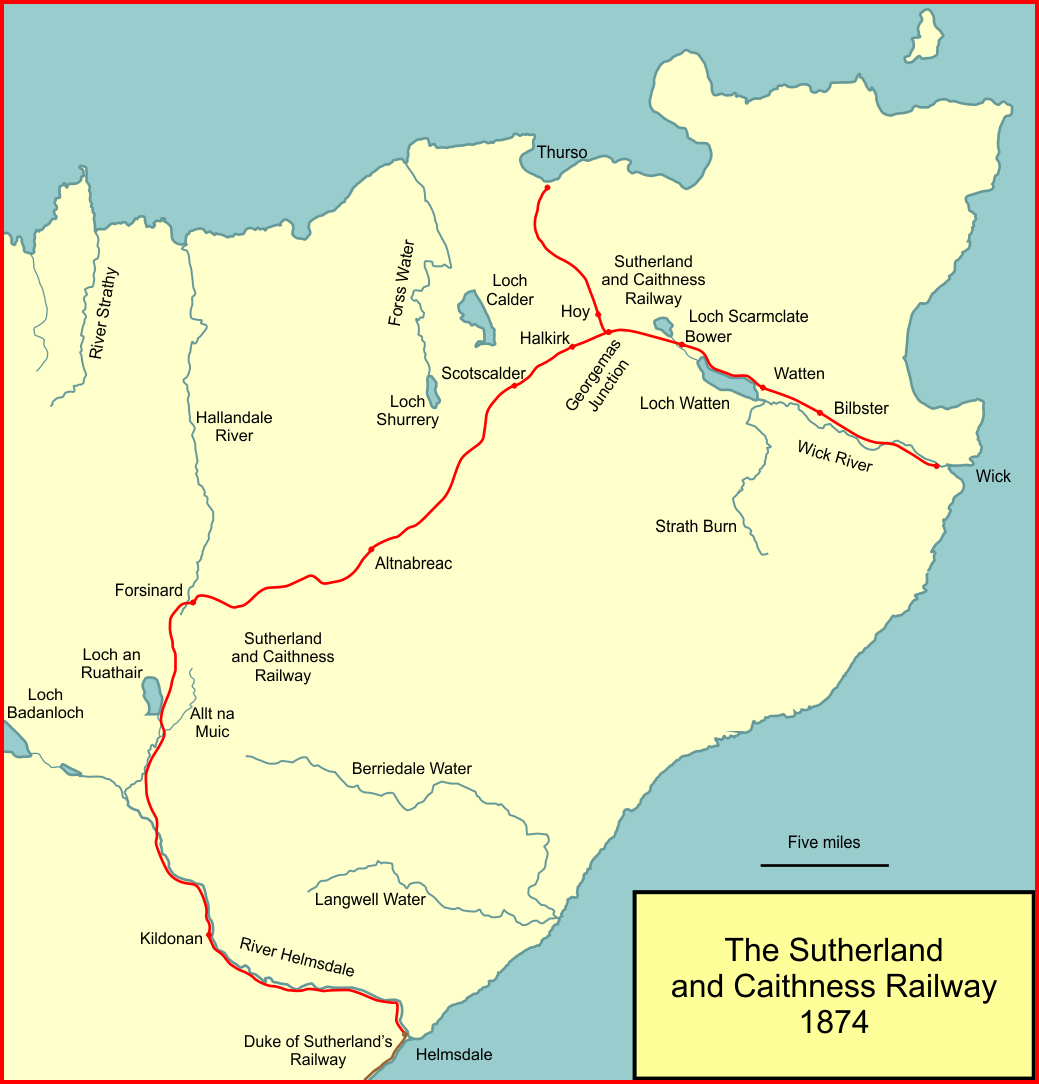
Sutherland and Caithness Railway in 1874

Interests in Inverness had pushed railways northwards: the Inverness and Ross-shire Railway opened as far as a Bonar Bridge station in 1864; the Sutherland Railway had got as far as Golspie before running out of money in 1868; and the Duke of Sutherland had put his own money into building what became the Duke of Sutherland's Railway, opening to Helmsdale in 1871. A tract of wild and thinly populated territory lay north of Helmsdale, but at the northern extremity of mainland Scotland lay Thurso, and to its east Wick, both important towns.

== Caithness Railway ==
Caithness Railway Act 1866
- Act of Parliament
- Parliament of the United Kingdom
- Long title: An Act to authorize the Construction of a Railway between Wick and Thurso in the County of Caithness, to be called "The Caithness Railway."
- Citation: 29 & 30 Vict. c. ccxcii

Dates
- Royal assent: 30 July 1866

The Caithness Railway was formed with the plan of connecting Wick and Thurso to one another, without connecting to the Sutherland lines. It obtained an act of Parliament, the Caithness Railway Act 1866 (29 & 30 Vict. c. ccxcii), authorising it on 30 July 1866, but no construction was carried out, due to lack of share subscription "despite strenuous efforts". Thurso's population in 1864 was 7,475 and Wick had 3,426. It applied for an extension of time in the 1871 session of Parliament, but was opposed by a bill from the Sutherland and Caithness Railway, which proposed connecting the Duke of Sutherland's Railway at Helmsdale to Wick and Thurso. This was obviously much more in the public interest, and it was the Sutherland and Caithness Railway which was authorised; the Caithness Railway Company's powers were cancelled.

Ross provides much more detail of the politics:

Wick was the county town of Caithness, and the largest town in the north of Scotland, with 7,475 inhabitants in 1864. Thurso had 3,426. For 35 miles to the south of those places there was poor land scarcely capable of sustaining crofters, but between Thurso and Wick there were arable and sheep-rearing farms. Scrabster harbour had been built for exporting locally quarried flagstones in the early 1840s. Both Scrabster and Wick were involved as steamer ports and in the fishing industry.

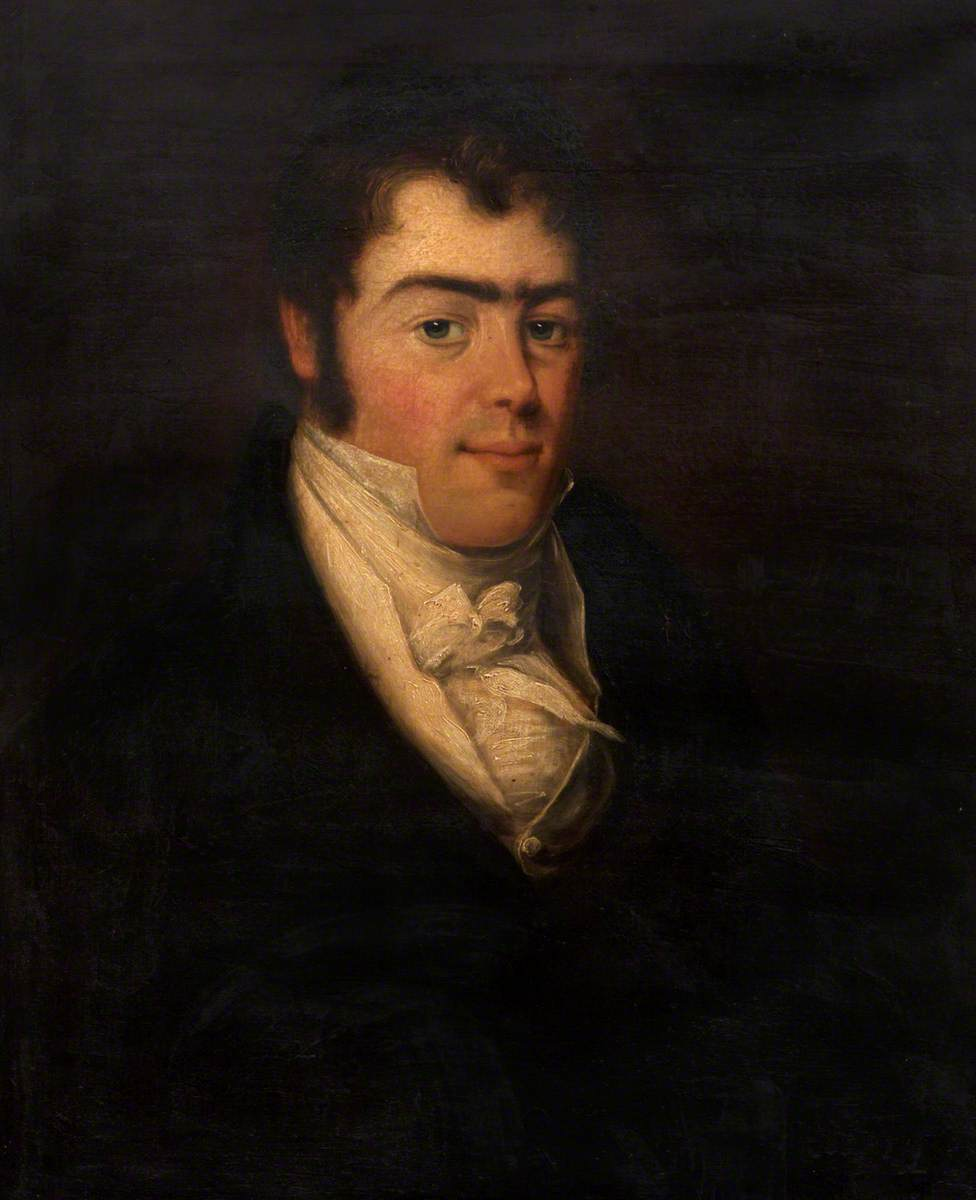
Joseph Mitchell

When the Inverness and Ross-shire Railway was being built, there was discussion too of a possible railway to link Wick and Thurso, and in September 1864 the Earl of Caithness formed a committee to promote a railway to join with the line coming north from Inverness. The engineer Joseph Mitchell was asked to survey a line from Helmsdale to Wick and Thurso.

Immediately north of Helmsdale, the mountainous Ord of Caithness presents a barrier that is discouraging for railway designers, and Mitchell recommended a route that went round it to the north-west; it added mileage but would be cheaper and easier. Such a route would also open up inland country that might be developed for agriculture. In Wick this was unpopular, as the committee wanted the shortest line from Wick to the south, which meant a coastal route via the Ord. Such a route was designed, with a summit level of 1,074 ft and a gradient of 1 in 40 for a distance of seven miles; in addition a rope worked incline would be needed for a 1 in 10 slope at Berriedale. Common sense prevailed and this wild scheme was abandoned.

Returning to Mitchell's route, raising the money was now a problem, as Wick was satisfied with its coastal shipping links and did not wish to pay to open up areas of Sutherland. The railway contractor Thomas Brassey was now brought in, and he provisionally agreed that he would construct the line and take £100,000 in shares as part payment. This still left a considerable sum to be found, and interests in Caithness were unwilling to help. The Duke of Sutherland withdrew his financial support in consequence. The Caithness Railway got its Act for a "local line" (Wick to Thurso) on 30 July 1866, but against a nominal share capital of £130,000, the value of shares subscribed was only £27,000. The railway was quite unable to build its line.

Sutherland and Caithness Railway Act 1871
- Act of Parliament
- Parliament of the United Kingdom
- Long title: An Act for making a Railway from Helmsdale in the county of Sutherland to Wick in the county of Caithness, with a Branch to Thurso, to be called "The Sutherland and Caithness Railway;" and for other purposes.
- Citation: 34 & 35 Vict. c. xcix

Dates
- Royal assent: 13 July 1871

Text of statute as originally enacted

The construction of the Duke of Sutherland's Railway, reaching Helmsdale in 1870, spurred the slumbering Caithness Railway directors into action, and they resolved to build a line, pretty much like Mitchell's original route, from Helmsdale to Wick and Thurso. They did not say how the money would be forthcoming now when it was not in 1866. The Duke of Sutherland decided upon promoting a similar line, the Sutherland and Caithness Railway. In the 1871 session of Parliament, the Sutherland and Caithness Railway was proposed by the Duke of Sutherland, while the Caithness Railway also went to Parliament asking for an extension of time. The opposing schemes were reviewed by the parliamentary select committee on 3 and 4 May 1871, and it was the Sutherland and Caithness Railway Act 1871 (34 & 35 Vict. c. xcix) that was passed on 13 July 1871. The Caithness Railway was rejected, and it was abandoned by Board of Trade order on 23 January 1873.

== Narrow gauge alternative ==
During the survey the Duke of Sutherland had seriously considered the idea of a 2 ft 6in gauge line: the potential saving in construction and operating costs was tempting, but the problem of trans-shipping goods and passengers prevailed.

The Times Newspaper carried a report on The Railways of the Future. A part of that was a discussion of the Double Fairlie locomotives on the Festiniog Railway:

The Duke of Sutherland said he wished he had known more of the Festiniog Railway six years ago. "I have expended," said His Grace, "about £200,000 in promoting and making railways in the north. Had these lines been constructed on the narrow gauge, and had they in consequence cost only two-thirds of the sum that has been expended on them, I should have obtained a direct return on this large sum which I have laid out for the benefit of my estates and of the people in those remote districts. As it is I shall suffer considerable loss."

== Sutherland and Caithness ==
The Wick line stopped at the town boundary of Wick, and the Thurso branch at the edge of town, without giving access to Wick harbour or Scrabster pier. Joseph Mitchell had criticised the fact. Once again the Duke of Sutherland supplied money: he put £60,000 into the new line, and the Highland Railway guaranteed £50,000. Not one shareholder came from Wick. At this point, 7,603 shares had been issued, at a value of £76,030.

Between 400 and 560 men were employed in each main section, many being local or from elsewhere in Sutherland. They departed so far from the conventional image of the railway navvy as to combine among themselves to pay for a preacher to come on Sunday. In order to provide accommodation for them, the planned houses for isolated surfacemen were built early.

During the construction, there were immense tracts of soft peat moss to contend with from the County March to Dorrery, a distance of 12 miles.

The first train to traverse the new railway from end to end was the duke's. He drove his own locomotive Dunrobin into the new station at Wick on 9 July 1874, two days after the last rails had been laid. The Provost and a few local worthies turned out to greet him, but it was a somewhat restrained reception for 'they do not in their corporate or personal capacity hold a single £10 share of the railway among them'.

His train then went to Thurso, where a crowd estimated at three thousand was waiting, with two bands. A banquet had been prepared, at which the duke was a somewhat reluctant guest of honour. Sir Tollemache Sinclair had organised a collection to make him a presentation to mark his contribution, but the duke deprecated the notion, saying he had enough silver plate already, and asked that Sir Tollemache's collection be distributed among 'those poor fellows who have borne the burden and the heat of the day in pushing on the works as they have done. I refer to the workmen on the line'.

The line was inspected on 20 July for the Board of Trade by Col. Rich, who declared himself fully satisfied, and opening was set for Tuesday 28 July 1874. The first train for the south left Wick at 5.10 a.m. on that day, 'without even a cheer'. The number of passengers was estimated at between 70 and 80.

By August 1874, a month after the opening of the line, the authorised capital was £480,000, comprising £360,000 in Ordinary shares and £119,960 in loans.

== Highland Railway ==
The Sutherland and Caithness Railway merged with the Highland Railway on 1 September 1884 by the Highland Railway (Northern Lines Amalgamation) Act 1884 (47 & 48 Vict. c. clxxxiv).

== Locations ==
- Helmsdale; station on Duke of Sutherland's Railway; opened 17 May 1871;
- Salzcraggie Platform; opened for private shooting 28 July 1874; fully public from 26 May 1907; plain Salzcraggie from 1962; closed 29 November 1965;
- Kildonan; opened 28 July 1874; still open;
- Borrobol Platform; opened September 1876; renamed Borrobol 10 September 1962; closed 29 November 1965;
- Kinbrace; opened 28 July 1874;
- Forsinard; opened 28 July 1874; still open;
- County March Summit; 708 feet;
- Altnabreac; opened 28 July 1874; still open;
- Scotscalder; opened 28 July 1874; still open;
- Halkirk; opened 28 July 1874; closed 13 June 1960;
- Georgemas Junction; opened 28 July 1874; often plain Georgemas;
- Bower; opened 28 July 1874; closed 13 June 1960;
- Watten; opened 28 July 1874; closed 13 June 1960;
- Bilbster; opened 28 July 1874; closed 13 June 1960;
- Wick; opened 28 July 1874;

=== Thurso branch ===
- Georgemas Junction;
- Hoy; opened 1 October 1874; closed 29 November 1965;
- Thurso; opened 28 July 1874; still open.

The Wick and Lybster Light Railway connected at Wick 1903 – 1944.

== Current operations ==
The line is now part of the Far North Line, from Inverness to Wick and Inverness.
