= List of listed buildings in Creich, Highland =

This is a list of listed buildings in the parish of Creich in Highland, Scotland.

== List ==
Name	Location	Date Listed	Grid Ref. (Note: Sometimes known as OSGB36, the grid reference (where provided) is based on the British national grid reference system used by the Ordnance Survey. • "Guide to National Grid". Ordnance Survey. • "Get-a-map". Ordnance Survey.)	Geo-coordinates	Notes	LB Number (Note: Historic Environment Scotland assign a unique alphanumeric identifier to each designated site in Scotland, for listed buildings this always begins with "LB", for example "LB12345".)	Image
Bonar Bridge, Bank Of Scotland				57°53′26″N 4°20′43″W	Category B	285	Upload another image
Foot Bridge Over River Oykel, Brae Doune				57°58′27″N 4°38′18″W	Category B	287	Upload another image See more images
Creich Old Manse (Former Church Of Scotland Manse) And Walled Garden				57°52′22″N 4°17′55″W	Category C(S)	264	Upload Photo
Ospisdale House And West Gate Piers				57°52′44″N 4°10′14″W	Category B	274	Upload another image
Balblair House Gate Lodges And Entrance Gates Only				57°54′50″N 4°22′52″W	Category C(S)	283	Upload Photo
Rosehall, North Lodge And Adjoining Walls				57°58′46″N 4°34′19″W	Category C(S)	276	Upload another image
Bonar Bridge Migdale Hospital				57°53′31″N 4°20′09″W	Category B	284	Upload Photo
Cassley Bridge Over River Cassley, Rosehall				57°59′00″N 4°35′10″W	Category B	277	Upload another image See more images
Bonar Bridge, Creich Parish Church				57°53′34″N 4°20′42″W	Category C(S)	288	Upload another image See more images
Migdale Free Church Wall And Gate Piers				57°53′51″N 4°19′07″W	Category C(S)	268	Upload another image
Migdale Mill				57°53′45″N 4°18′48″W	Category C(S)	271	Upload Photo
Migdale Mill House				57°53′44″N 4°18′50″W	Category C(S)	272	Upload Photo
Rosehall House And Walled Garden				57°58′38″N 4°34′50″W	Category B	275	Upload another image See more images
Old Shin Bridge Over River Shin, Inveran				57°56′39″N 4°24′33″W	Category B	265	Upload another image See more images
Invernauld Bridge Over Allt Mor Burn				57°58′05″N 4°33′08″W	Category B	266	Upload another image
Migdale Free Church Manse				57°53′52″N 4°19′12″W	Category C(S)	270	Upload Photo
Spinningdale, Feorlig				57°52′44″N 4°14′15″W	Category B	281	Upload Photo
Migdale Free Church Parish Room And Adjoining Cottage				57°53′51″N 4°19′09″W	Category C(S)	269	Upload Photo
Shin Railway Viaduct Over Kyle of Sutherland				57°55′27″N 4°24′04″W	Category A	279	Upload another image See more images
Achinduich Old Achinduich House				57°57′56″N 4°24′05″W	Category B	282	Upload Photo
Bonar Bridge, Bridge End				57°53′31″N 4°20′48″W	Category C(S)	286	Upload Photo
Invershin Farm And Salmon Station				57°56′10″N 4°24′39″W	Category B	267	Upload Photo
Old Oykel Bridge Over River Oykel				57°58′05″N 4°43′51″W	Category B	273	Upload another image See more images
Skibo Castle, Principal Gate Lodge And Entrance Gates And Piers				57°52′19″N 4°10′27″W	Category B	280	Upload another image
Rosehall Free Church				57°58′35″N 4°33′54″W	Category C(S)	278	Upload Photo

== Key ==
The scheme for classifying buildings in Scotland is:

- Category A: "buildings of national or international importance, either architectural or historic; or fine, little-altered examples of some particular period, style or building type."
- Category B: "buildings of regional or more than local importance; or major examples of some particular period, style or building type, which may have been altered."
- Category C: "buildings of local importance; lesser examples of any period, style, or building type, as originally constructed or moderately altered; and simple traditional buildings which group well with other listed buildings."

In March 2016 there were 47,288 listed buildings in Scotland. Of these, 8% were Category A, and 50% were Category B, with the remaining 42% being Category C.

== See also ==
- List of listed buildings in Highland
