= Culrain railway station =

Railway station in Highland, Scotland

Culrain Scottish Gaelic: Cùil Rathain
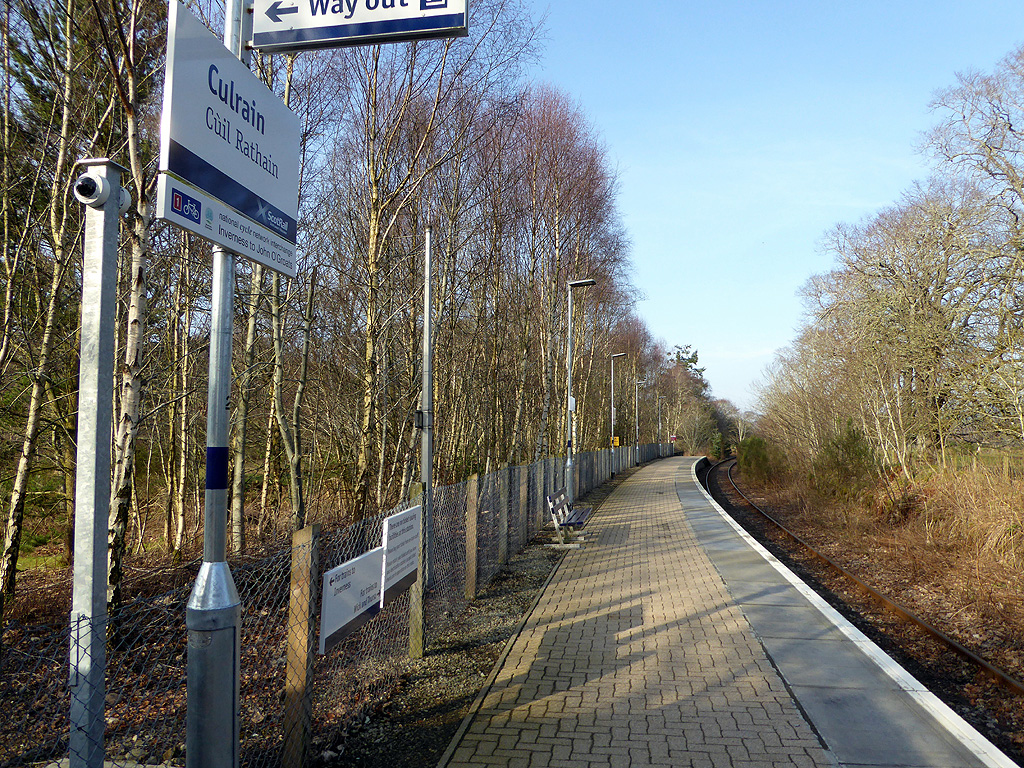
- The platform at Culrain, looking north

General information
- Location: Culrain, Highland; Scotland
- Coordinates: 57.9196°N 4.4045°W
- Grid reference: NH576947
- Manager: ScotRail
- Platforms: 1

Other information
- Station code: CUA

History
- Original company: Sutherland Railway
- Pre-grouping: Highland Railway
- Post-grouping: LMSR

Key dates
- 1871: Opened

Passengers
- 2021/22: ▲164
- 2022/23: ▲304
- 2023/24: ▼300
- 2024/25: ▲318
- 2025/26: ▲440
Location
Notes
- Passenger statistics from the Office of Rail and Road

Culrain railway station serves the village of Culrain in Kyle of Sutherland in the Highland council area of Scotland. It is located on the Far North Line. It is 61 miles 0 chains (98.2 km) from Inverness, between Ardgay and Invershin. ScotRail, who manage the station, operate all services.

== History ==
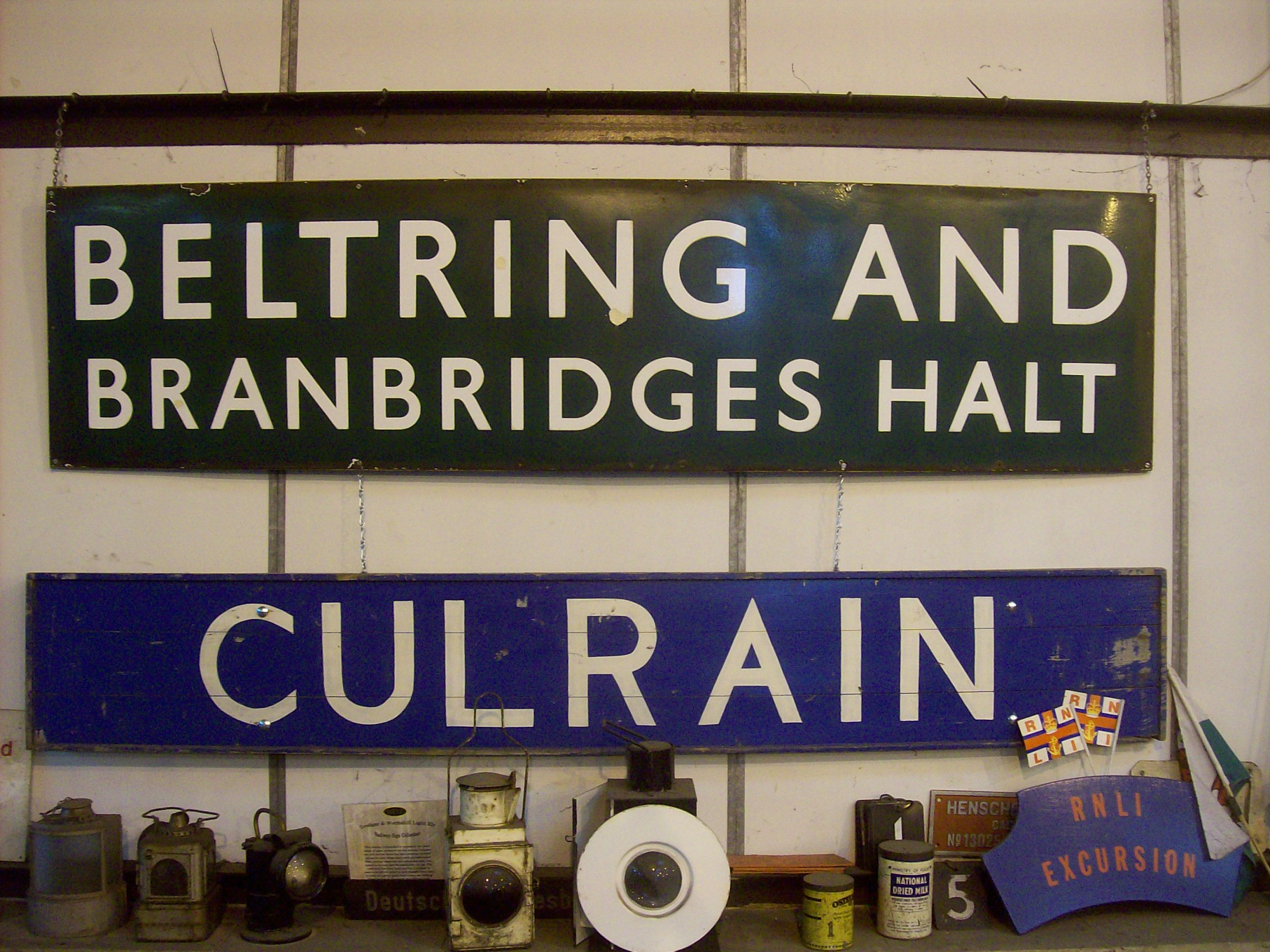
Station nameboard now preserved at the Bredgar and Wormshill Light Railway

The station opened in 1870 or 1871, as part of the Sutherland Railway, later becoming part of the Highland Railway and later the London, Midland and Scottish Railway.

The original nameboard is now preserved at the Bredgar and Wormshill Light Railway, in Kent.

== Location ==
The station is close to Carbisdale Castle, which operated from 1945 to 2011 as a youth hostel owned by the Scottish Youth Hostels Association. The hostel has been closed since 2011 as a result of structural damage. Following its sale to a consortium in 2016, planning permission was granted in 2017/2018 to turn the castle back into a private residence but now with swimming pool.

== Facilities ==
The station has a waiting shelter, a bench, a help point and cycle racks, and has step-free access. As there are no facilities to purchase tickets, passengers must buy one in advance, or from the guard on the train.

On 20 December 2022, Transport Scotland introduced a new "Press & Ride" system at Culrain, following successful trials of the system at Scotscalder over the previous four months. Previously, passengers wishing to board a train at Culrain had to flag the train by raising their arm (as is still done at other request stops around the country); this meant that the driver needed to reduce the train's speed before a request stop (to look out for any potential passengers on the platform and be able to stop if necessary), even if the platform was empty. The new system consists of an automatic kiosk (with a button for passengers to press) at the platform; this will alert the driver about any waiting passengers in advance and, if there is no requirement to stop, the train can maintain line speed through the request stops, thus improving reliability on the whole line.

== Platform layout ==
The station has a single platform which is long enough for a five-coach train. The railway line through Culrain is single track, with the nearest passing loop to the north being at Lairg and to the south at Ardgay.

== Passenger volume ==
Passenger Volume at Culrain
| | 2004–05 | 2005–06 | 2006–07 | 2007–08 | 2008–09 | 2009–10 | 2010–11 | 2011–12 | 2012–13 | 2013–14 | 2014–15 | 2015–16 | 2016–17 | 2017–18 | 2018–19 | 2019–20 | 2020–21 | 2021–22 | 2022–23 | 2023–24 | 2024–25 |
|---|---|---|---|---|---|---|---|---|---|---|---|---|---|---|---|---|---|---|---|---|---|
| Entries and exits | 2,016 | 1,707 | 1,771 | 1,785 | 1,886 | 1,722 | 1,708 | 526 | 474 | 628 | 530 | 432 | 372 | 300 | 280 | 312 | 42 | 164 | 304 | 300 | 318 |

The statistics cover twelve month periods that start in April.

== Services ==
On Mondays to Saturdays, there are four trains a day southbound to Inverness and four northbound to Wick. On Sundays, there is one train in each direction.

| Preceding station | National Rail | Following station |
|---|---|---|
| Ardgay | ScotRail; Far North Line | Invershin |
| | Historical railways | |
| Bonar Bridge; Line and Station open | Highland Railway; Sutherland Railway | Invershin; Line and Station open |

== Bibliography ==
- Brailsford, Martyn, ed. (December 2017) [1987]. Railway Track Diagrams 1: Scotland & Isle of Man (6th ed.). Frome: Trackmaps. ISBN 978-0-9549866-9-8.
- Butt, R. V. J. (October 1995). The Directory of Railway Stations: details every public and private passenger station, halt, platform and stopping place, past and present (1st ed.). Sparkford: Patrick Stephens Ltd. ISBN 978-1-85260-508-7. OCLC 60251199. OL 11956311M.
- Jowett, Alan (March 1989). Jowett's Railway Atlas of Great Britain and Ireland: From Pre-Grouping to the Present Day (1st ed.). Sparkford: Patrick Stephens Ltd. ISBN 978-1-85260-086-0. OCLC 22311137.
- Quick, Michael (2023). Railway Passenger Stations in Great Britain: A Chronology (PDF) (5th ed.). London: Railway and Canal Historical Society.
