= John O'Groat =

Overview
- Service type: Passenger train
- First service: 26 July 1936
- Former operator(s): London, Midland and Scottish Railway

Route
- Termini: Inverness; Wick
- Service frequency: Daily
- Line(s) used: Far North Line

The John O'Groat was a named passenger train operating in the United Kingdom.

== History ==
The service was introduced on 26 July 1936 by the London, Midland and Scottish Railway. It was given to the 4.10pm train from Inverness to Wick and Thurso.

The name was abandoned at the outbreak of the Second World War in 1939, and not re-adopted afterwards.
