= Far North Line =

Railway line in Scotland

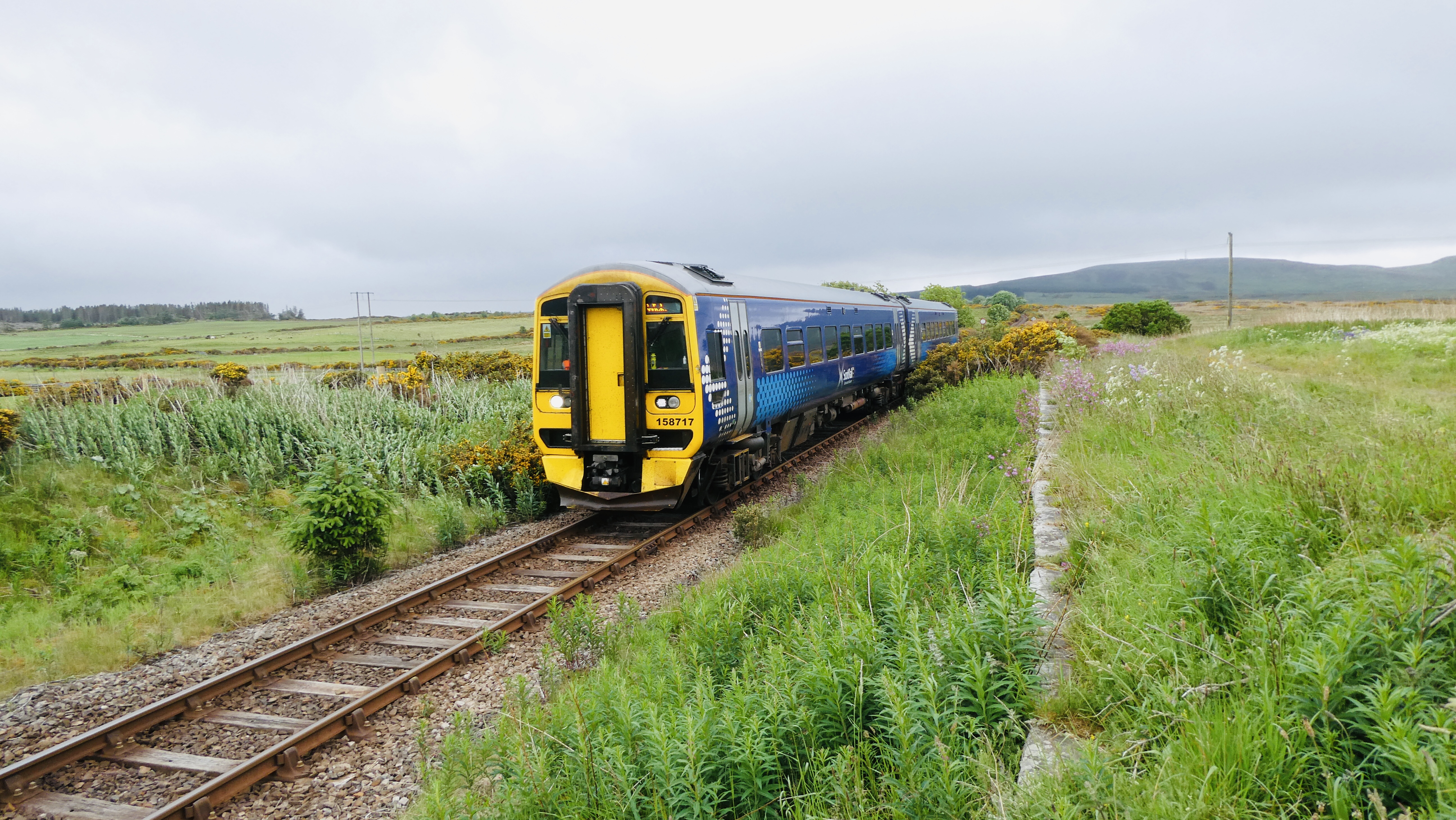
- An Abellio ScotRail Class 158 approaches Scotscalder

Overview
- Native name: Loidhne a' Chinn a Tuath
- Status: Operational
- Owner: Network Rail
- Locale: Highland; Scotland
- Termini: Inverness; Wick/Thurso
- Stations: 26

Service
- System: National Rail
- Operator: ScotRail
- Rolling stock: Class 158 "Express Sprinter"

History
- Opened: 1862–1874

Technical
- Line length: Inverness to Wick: 161 miles 33 chains (259.8 km); Georgemas Junction to Thurso: 6 miles 50 chains (10.7 km); Total: 168 miles 03 chains (270.4 km)
- Number of tracks: Single-track with passing loops
- Character: Rural
- Track gauge: 4 ft 8 1/2 in (1,435 mm) standard gauge
- Electrification: None
Route map
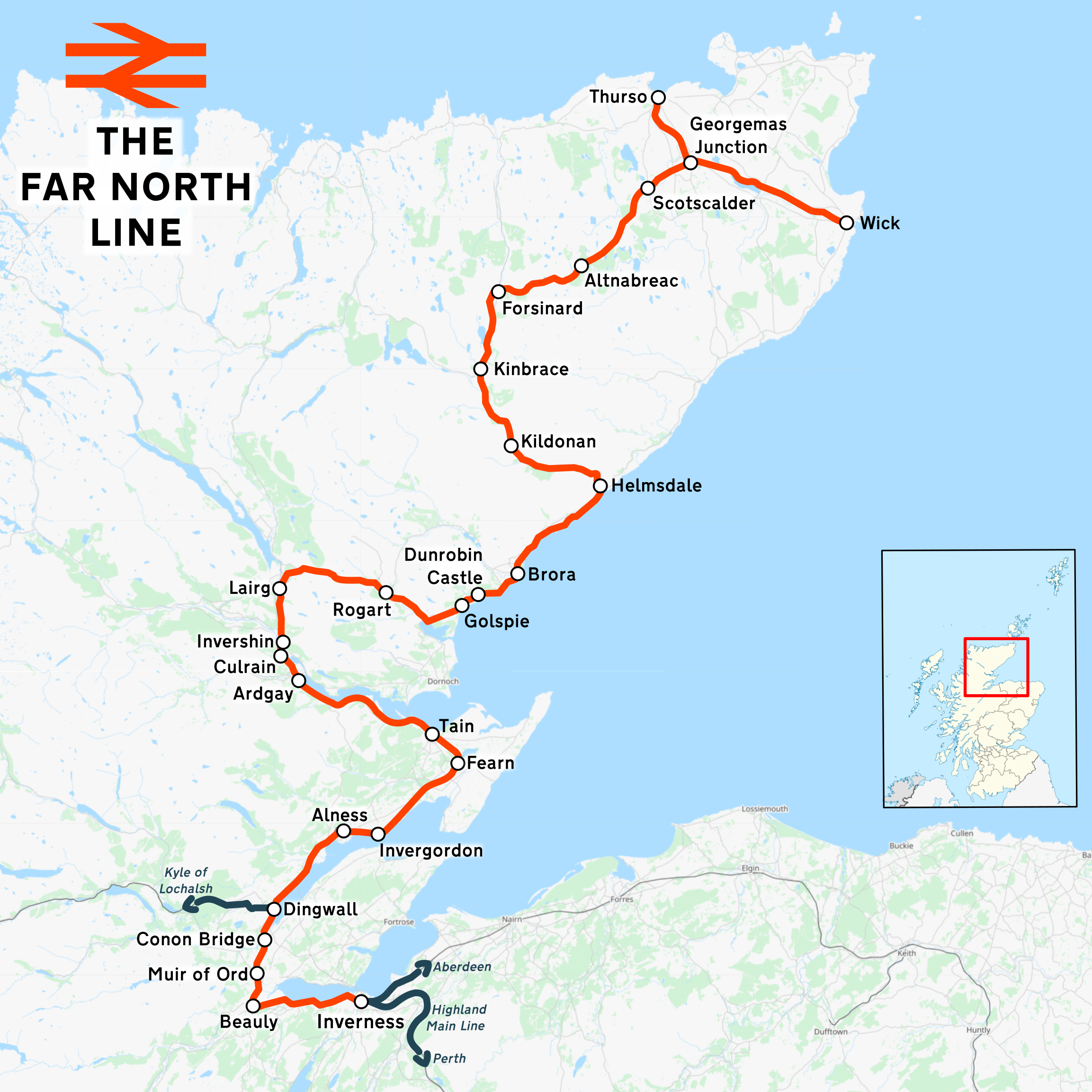
(Click to expand)
Detailed View

The Far North Line (Scottish Gaelic: Loidhne a' Chinn a Tuath) is a rural railway line entirely within the Highland area of Scotland, extending from Inverness to Thurso and Wick. As the name suggests, it is the northernmost railway in the United Kingdom. The line is entirely single-track, with only passing loops at some intermediate stations allowing trains to pass each other. Like other railway lines in the Highlands and northern Lowlands, it is not electrified and all trains are diesel-powered.

== Route ==
The line links the city of Inverness, the largest city in the Scottish Highlands, with the towns of Wick and Thurso at the northeastern tip of Britain.

Like the A9 trunk road north of Inverness, the Far North Line broadly follows the east-facing coastline of the Moray Firth, with all three termini located on the coast. As such, the railway links many of the same places as the road.

Many more places were served by both the railway and the road before three new road bridges were built: across the Beauly Firth (between Inverness and the Black Isle), the Cromarty Firth and the Dornoch Firth. As a result, at some locations the railway is now a long way inland from the modern route of the A9.

The railway also loops a long way inland between Tain and Golspie, running via Lairg, which has never been on the A9; it was envisaged at the time of construction that this diversion would open the centre of Sutherland to trade. It also takes a large inland detour north of Helmsdale, running via the Flow Country, which the A9 also never passed through; this diversion was dictated by the unfavourable terrain of the Caithness coastline.

=== Inverness–Tain: through Ross-shire ===
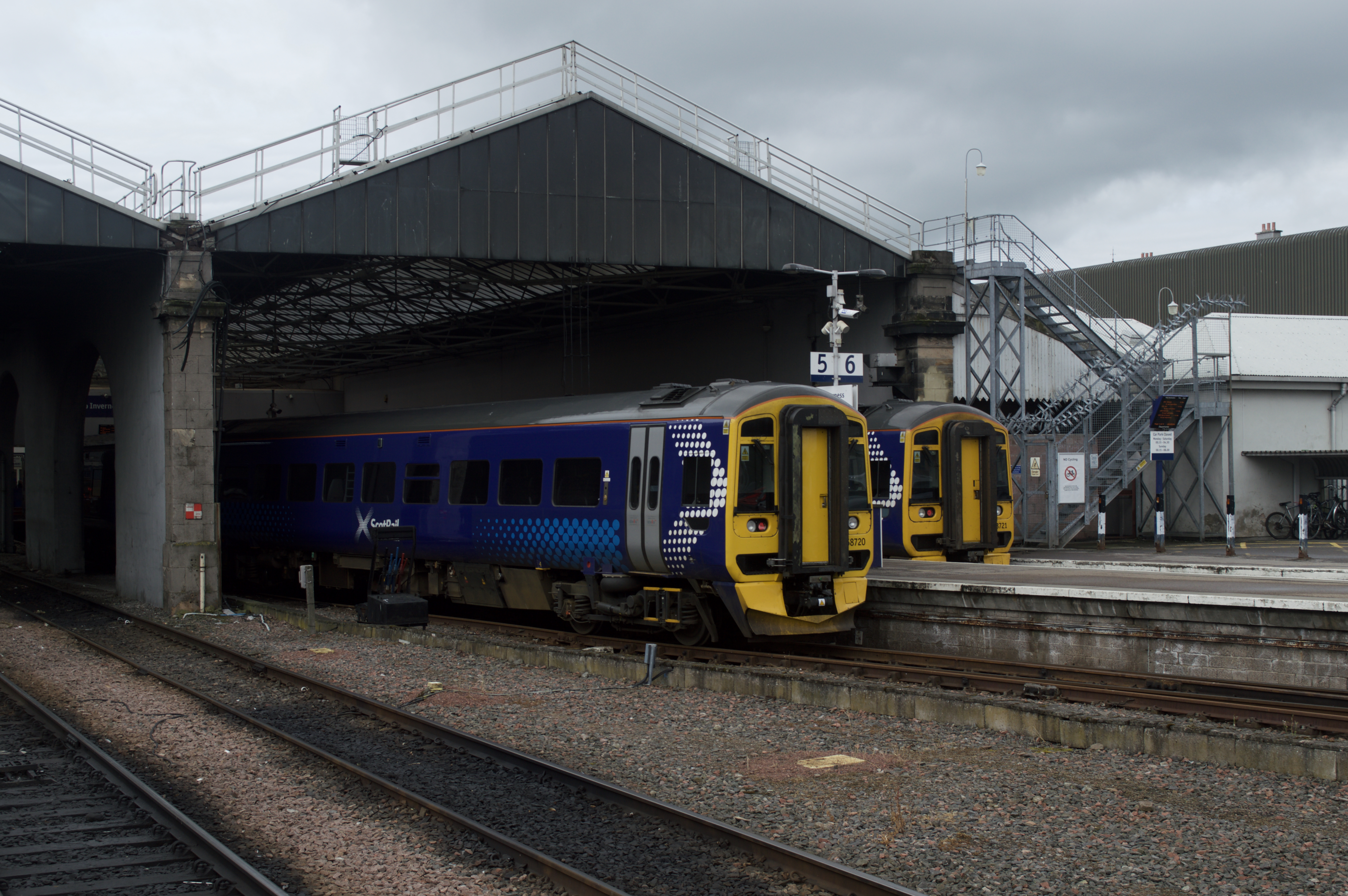
The Far North Line platforms at Inverness station, the southern terminus of the line

The railway line begins at Inverness station, (Note: Ordnance Survey grid reference: NH667454; Mileage from Inverness: 0 mi 2 ch (0.04 km)) where passenger connections are available for the Highland Main Line (to Perth, Glasgow, Edinburgh and London) and the Aberdeen–Inverness line (to Inverness Airport, Elgin and Aberdeen), as well as for bus services to destinations throughout the Scottish Highlands. While the A9 leaves Inverness by crossing the Beauly Firth on the Kessock Bridge, the Far North Line instead heads west and runs alongside the Firth.

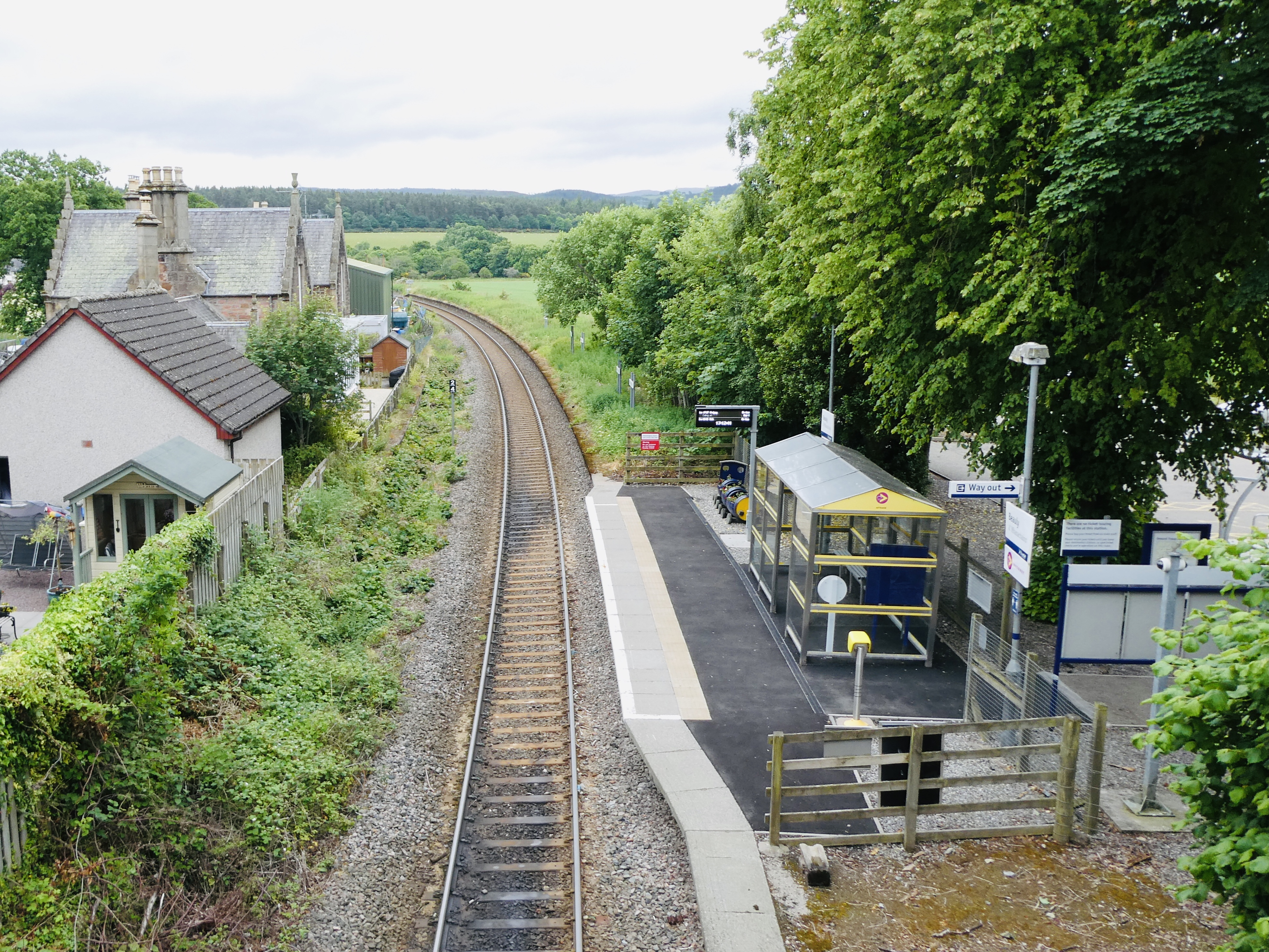
The 15.06-m platform of Beauly station, the shortest on the National Rail network.

The single track crosses both the River Ness and the Caledonian Canal before it leaves Inverness and parallels the A862 road (Note: This road was part of the A9 until the construction of the Kessock Bridge in 1982.) towards the village of Beauly. After 10 miles (16 km), the line crosses the River Beauly and then takes a sharp, almost 180° right turn (from a west-southwest heading to north-northeast); Beauly station (Note: Ordnance Survey grid reference: NH520457; Mileage from Inverness: 10 mi 12 ch (16.3 km)) is located halfway along this curve. Closed in 1960, the station reopened in 2002 and its single operational platform has the distinction of being the shortest on the National Rail network, at just 15.06 metres (49 ft 5 in).

The line then carries on north, crossing the historic county boundary from Inverness-shire into Ross and Cromarty just before reaching Muir of Ord station, (Note: Ordnance Survey grid reference: NH528501; Mileage from Inverness: 13 mi 04 ch (21.0 km)) which has two platforms and is the site of the first passing loop on the line. The line continues to parallel the A862 as it passes through Conon Bridge station, (Note: Ordnance Survey grid reference: NH540550; Mileage from Inverness: 16 mi 21 ch (26.2 km)) which reopened in 2013 in a similar style to Beauly and whose platform is just 2 centimetres (0.8 in) longer than that at Beauly. Shortly afterwards, the line crosses the River Conon and passes through the village of Maryburgh before reaching Dingwall station (Note: Ordnance Survey grid reference: NH553586; Mileage from Inverness: 18 mi 58 ch (30.1 km)) – the busiest station on the line aside from Inverness, with just over 80 thousand passengers recorded in the 2019–20 financial year.

At Dingwall Junction (Note: Ordnance Survey grid reference: NH554590; Mileage from Inverness: 18 mi 76 ch (30.5 km)) just north of the station, the Kyle of Lochalsh line diverges to the west. The Far North Line, meanwhile, rejoins the coast and continues northeast along the shoreline of the Cromarty Firth; the railway meets the A9 again shortly after, at the north end of the Cromarty Bridge.

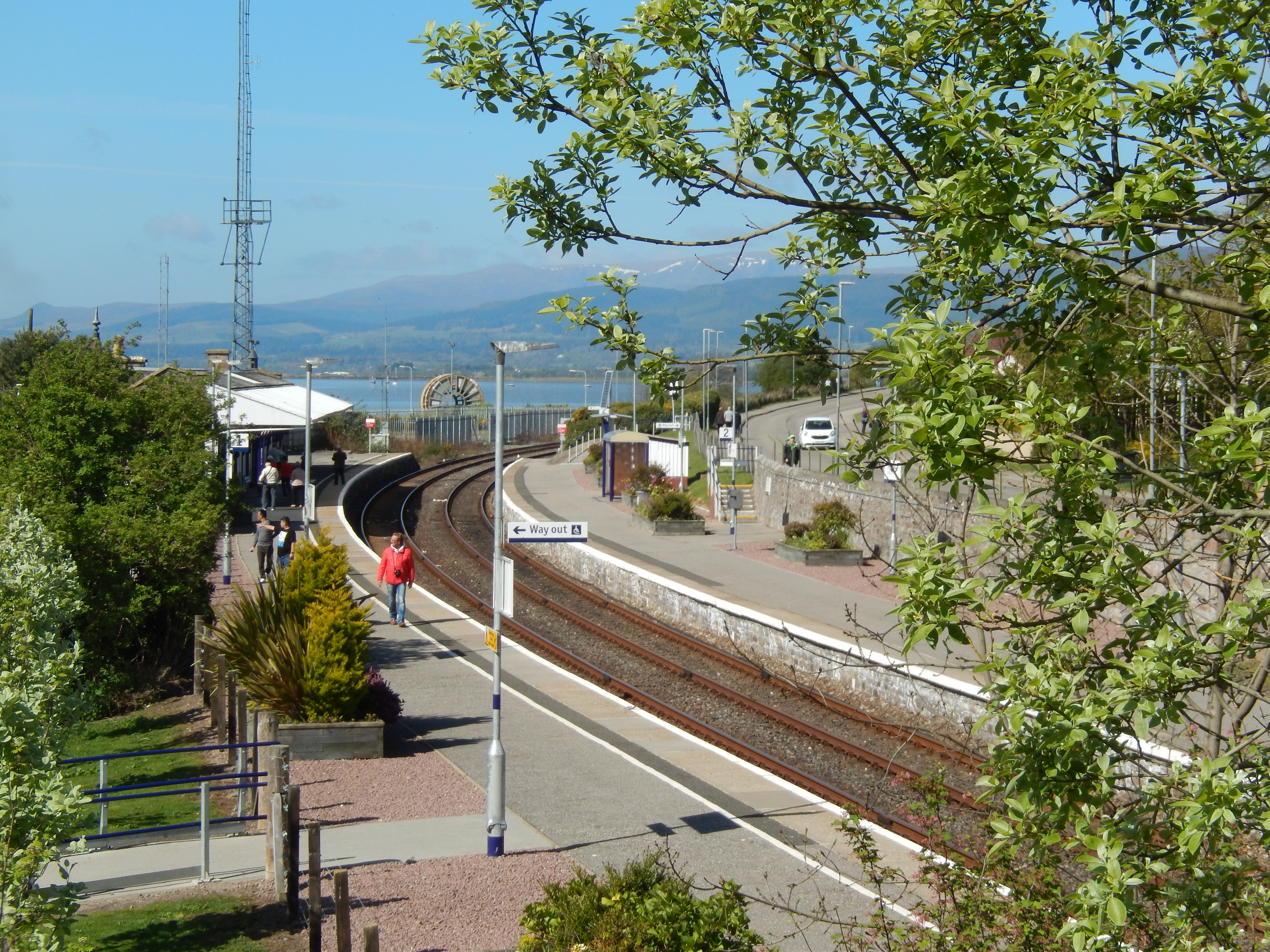
Invergordon railway station

The next station on the line is Alness, (Note: Ordnance Survey grid reference: NH659694; Mileage from Inverness: 28 mi 70 ch (46.5 km)) which closed in 1960 but reopened 13 years later. After Alness the line turns gently eastwards to reach Invergordon station (Note: Ordnance Survey grid reference: NH704686; Mileage from Inverness: 31 mi 37 ch (50.6 km)) before turning northeast again. The line continues in this direction for nearly 10 miles (16 km) without another station until Fearn. (Note: Ordnance Survey grid reference: NH815782; Mileage from Inverness: 40 mi 60 ch (65.6 km)) Located approximately 1.2 miles (1.9 km) west of Hill of Fearn, the primary source of traffic at the station, it is also the nearest railway stop to the Seaboard Villages. The railway then takes a sharp turn to run northwest for approximately 3 miles (5 km) until it reaches Tain station (Note: Ordnance Survey grid reference: NH781823; Mileage from Inverness: 44 mi 23 ch (71.3 km)) on the south side of the Dornoch Firth.

=== Tain–Helmsdale: Lairg loop and the Sutherland coast ===
A short distance west of Tain, the Far North Line and the A9 part ways again – while the road crosses the Dornoch Firth by means of a 900-metre (3,000 ft) bridge, (Note: Ordnance Survey grid reference for Dornoch Firth Bridge: NH748858) the railway line instead follows the coast of the Firth. In fact, the railway does not return to an open coastline for another 40 route miles (64 km) until Golspie, even though the distance between Tain and Golspie as the crow flies is only 11.1 miles (17.9 km). There have been many unsuccessful proposals to build a new, shorter railway line between the two villages via Dornoch, (Note: Ordnance Survey grid reference for Dornoch: NH798895) which led to the existing route via Lairg being sometimes unofficially called the "Lairg loop".

Soon after the A9 splits away, the line crosses the lieutenancy area boundary from Ross and Cromarty into Sutherland. The track follows the route of the A836 until the next station on the line, Ardgay, (Note: Ordnance Survey grid reference: NH600904; Mileage from Inverness: 57 mi 70 ch (93.1 km)) at the end of the Dornoch Firth. The station is in the village of Ardgay and also serves the slightly larger village of Bonar Bridge on the opposite side of the Kyle of Sutherland.

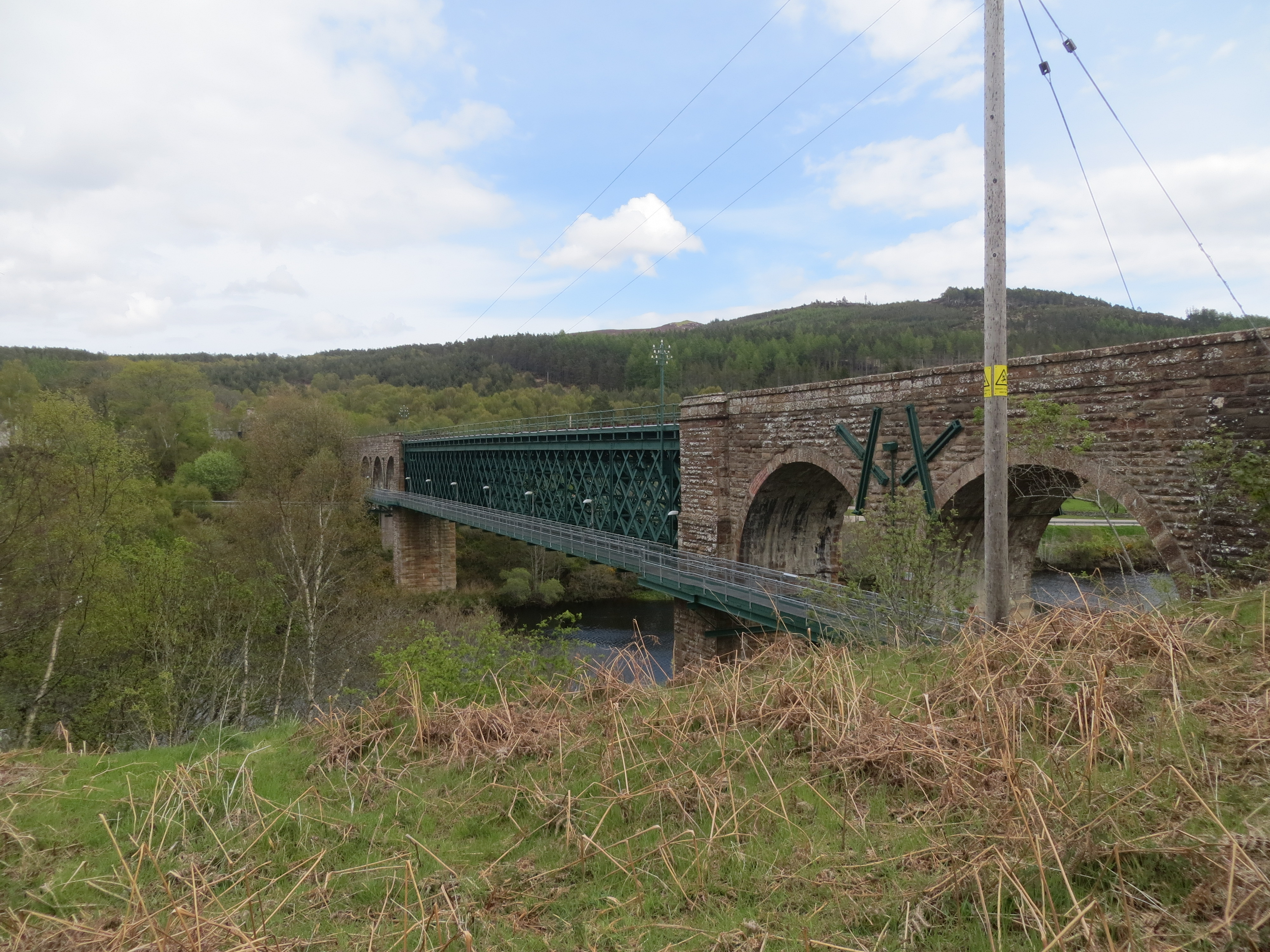
Invershin Viaduct over the Kyle of Sutherland; the public footpath across the Kyle can be seen immediately adjacent to the viaduct.

From Ardgay, the line runs northwards alongside the Kyle, and after just over 3 miles (5 km) it reaches the first two request stops en route – Culrain (Note: Ordnance Survey grid reference: NH577947; Mileage from Inverness: 61 mi 0 ch (98.2 km)) and Invershin, (Note: Ordnance Survey grid reference: NH579953; Mileage from Inverness: 61 mi 34 ch (98.9 km)) which lie on either side of the Invershin Viaduct over the Kyle. At just 34 chains (680 m), the distance between these two stations is among the shortest in all of Britain. (Note: Some sources state that this is in fact the closest pair of stations on the network, although stations such as Newhaven Town and Newhaven Harbour, which are only 26 chains (520 m) apart, disprove this claim.) There is no direct road connection between the two sides of the Kyle at this location, and a public footpath was only built alongside the viaduct in 2000; prior to this, the railway was the only way to travel between the two stations without taking a 7-mile-long (11 km) detour via Bonar Bridge. The Kyle once also marked the boundary between the historic counties of Ross and Cromarty and Sutherland; however, the modern boundary between the respective lieutenancy areas lies several miles to the south, putting both stations in modern-day Sutherland.

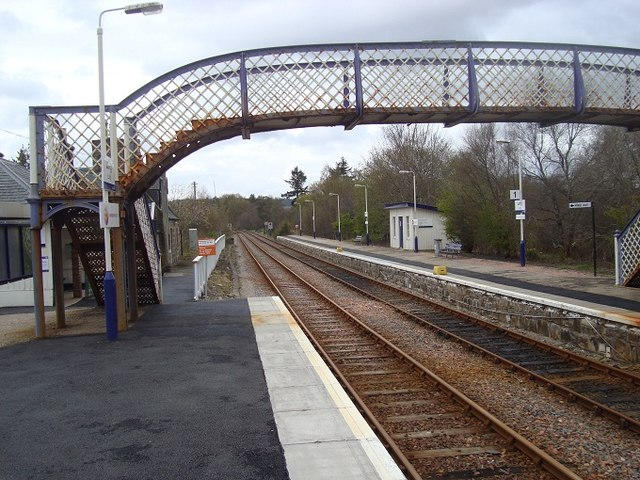
Lairg railway station

The track then continues northwards along the River Shin for another 5.5 miles (8.9 km) until it reaches Lairg station, (Note: Ordnance Survey grid reference: NC582064; Mileage from Inverness: 66 mi 78 ch (107.8 km)) located about 1.6 miles (2.6 km) south of the village itself. This is the furthest point away from the coast on the Lairg loop; beyond the station the line curves sharply eastwards and heads back towards the Moray Firth along Strath Fleet, now paralleling the A839 road. The line then passes through another request stop, Rogart, (Note: Ordnance Survey grid reference: NC725019; Mileage from Inverness: 77 mi 01 ch (123.9 km)) which actually lies in the small hamlet of Pittentrail and about 1.5 miles (2.4 km) south of Rogart itself; the station briefly closed in 1960, only to be reopened less than 9 months later. Immediately east of the station there is an open level crossing – the only such crossing on the line. Four miles (6.4 km) after Rogart, the railway meets the A9 again, as it passes by Mound Alderwoods and Loch Fleet. This was once the site of The Mound station and a junction with the Dornoch Light Railway to Dornoch; both the station and the branch closed in 1960. The railway then turns northeast and returns to the coast at Golspie, with the station (Note: Ordnance Survey grid reference: NH825997; Mileage from Inverness: 84 mi 30 ch (135.8 km)) located at the western end of the village.

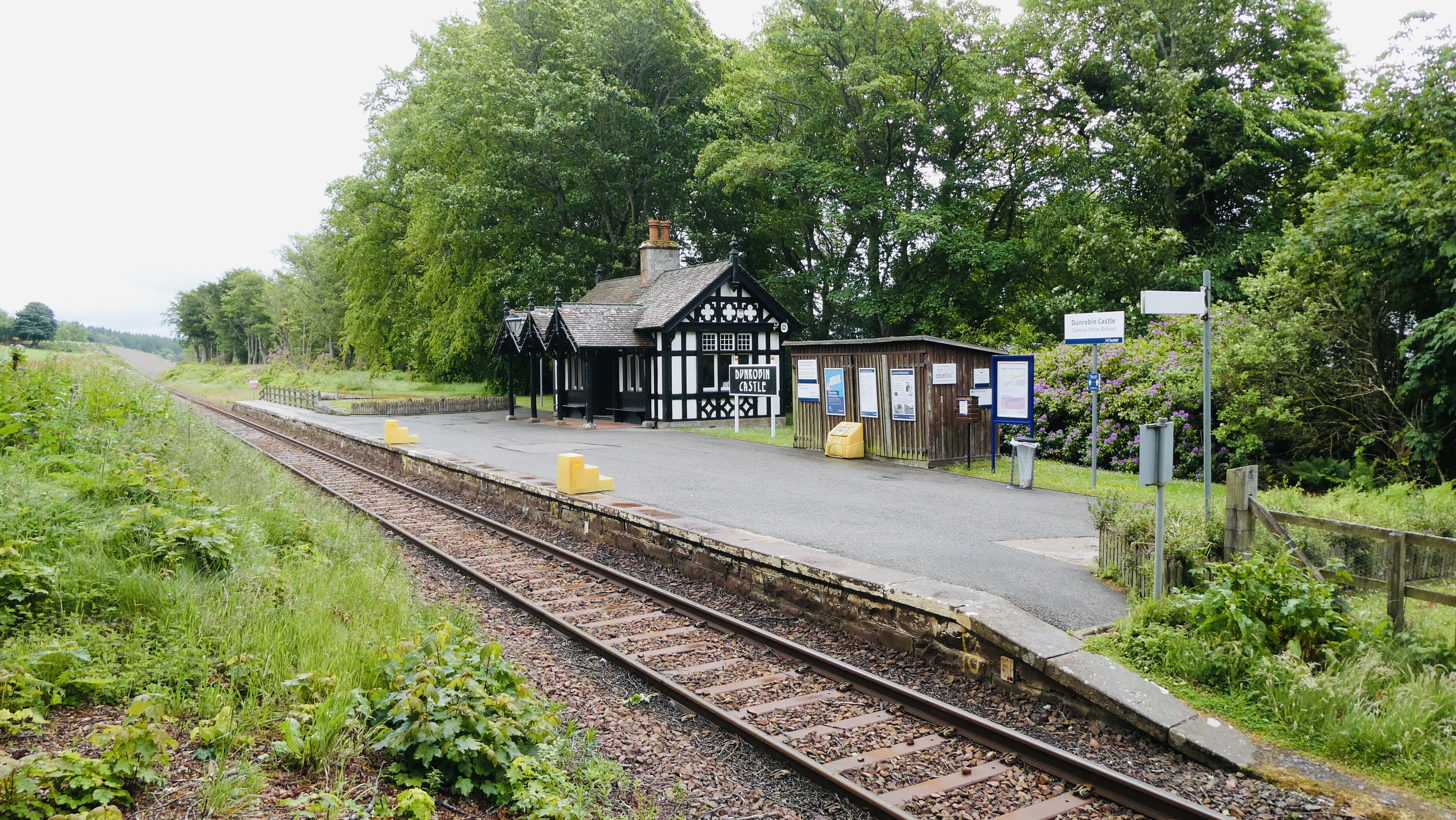
Dunrobin Castle railway station

Just east of Golspie, the line meets Dunrobin Castle station, (Note: Ordnance Survey grid reference: NC849013; Mileage from Inverness: 86 mi 22 ch (138.8 km)) which was built as a private, single-platform halt for the Duke of Sutherland to serve Dunrobin Castle a short distance south of the track. The station closed in 1965 but reopened in 1985; today, the station is a public request stop, although it is only open during the summer months (one of only two such stations on the National Rail network, alongside Falls of Cruachan elsewhere in Scotland), corresponding to the castle's annual opening times. The station is also notable for its lack of lighting; as such, no trains are scheduled to call at the platform before 9 am or after about 6 pm.

The line continues along the coast for another 15 miles (24 km), occasionally coming just metres away from the shoreline, passing through Brora station (Note: Ordnance Survey grid reference: NC906041; Mileage from Inverness: 90 mi 48 ch (145.8 km)) before reaching the village of Helmsdale, located at the mouth of the river of the same name. Helmsdale station (Note: Ordnance Survey grid reference: ND023155; Mileage from Inverness: 101 mi 40 ch (163.3 km)) lies on the other side of the river from most of the village.

=== Helmsdale–Wick/Thurso: Strath of Kildonan and Caithness ===
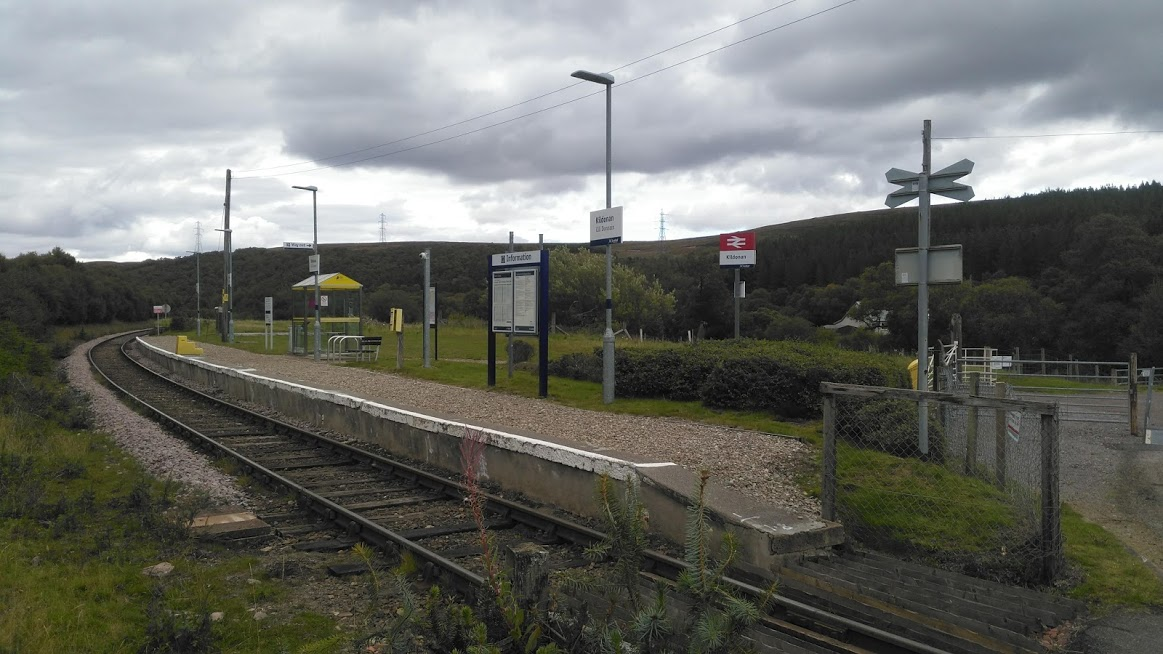
Kildonan railway station

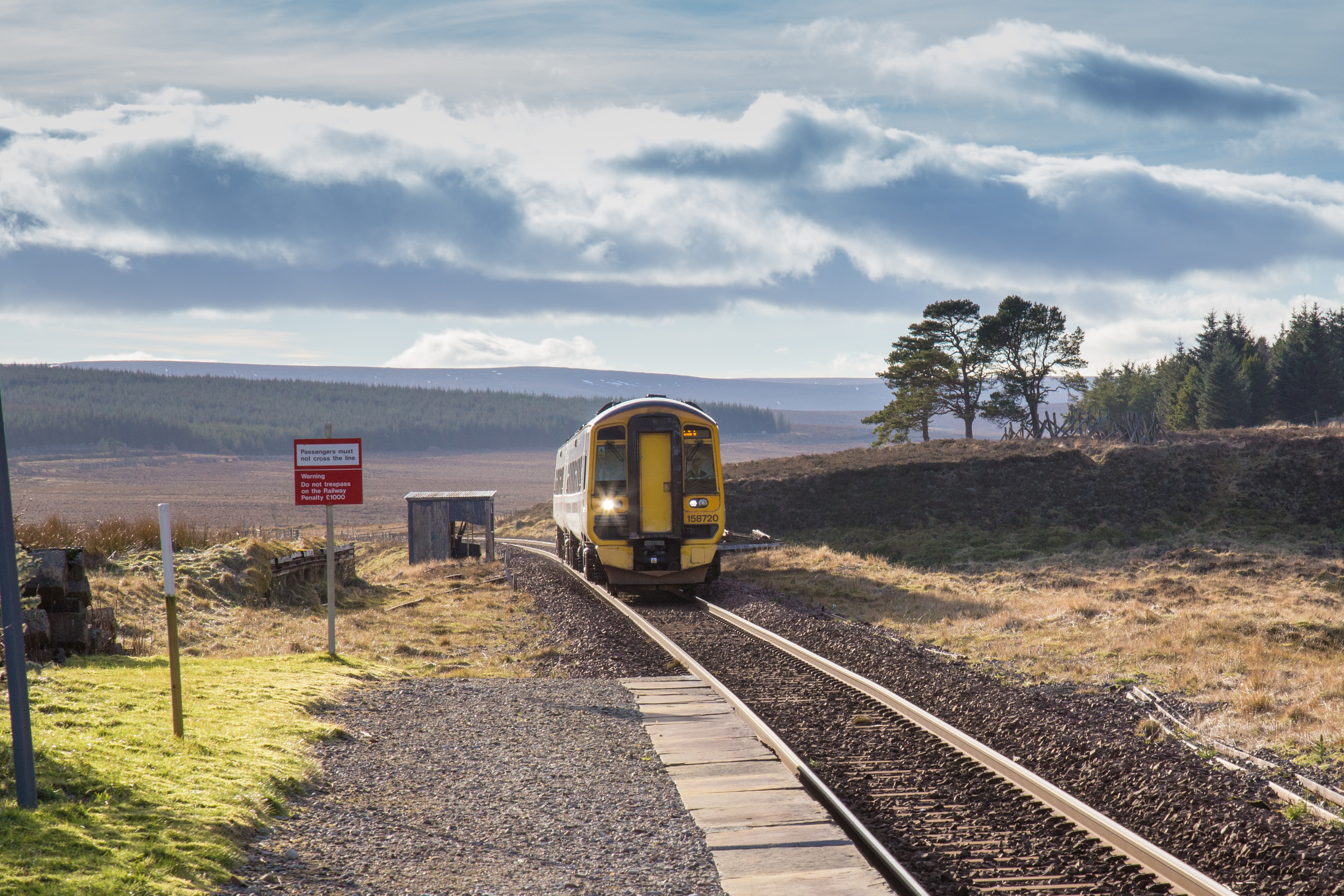
An Abellio ScotRail Class 158 (158720 "Inverness & Nairn Railway - 150 years") heads into Altnabreac station.

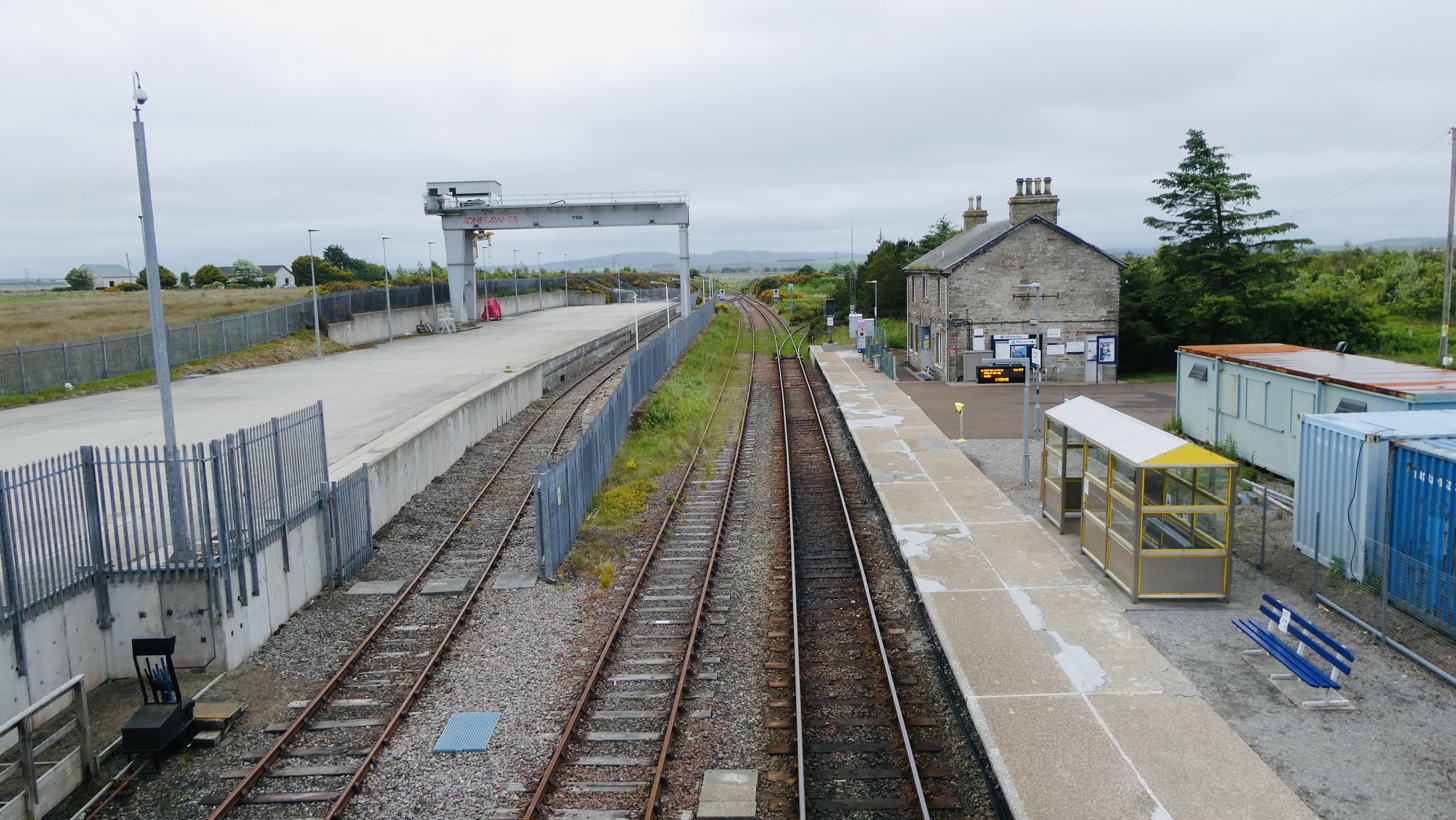
The platform and freight terminal at Georgemas Junction station, looking west towards Inverness; the branch to Thurso can be seen diverging off the main line to the right immediately beyond the platform.

Beyond Helmsdale, the railway is forced to divert away from the Moray Firth coast and from the A9 once again, avoiding the unfavourable terrain of the Ord of Caithness. Instead, the line takes a sharp turn northwest and heads inland towards the Flow Country – the largest expanse of blanket bog in Europe. This is by far the most remote section of the entire line: the majority of the intermediate stations along this stretch are request stops, and each station only serves a handful of isolated houses.

Initially, the single track follows the course of the Strath of Kildonan together with the A897. Kildonan station, (Note: Ordnance Survey grid reference: NC901217; Mileage from Inverness: 111 mi 05 ch (178.7 km)) one of the least-used stations on the line, lies approximately halfway along the Strath; the station was the site of a second open level crossing until early 2022, when it was replaced with a more standard barrier crossing (ABCL). The far end of the Strath, close to the point where the A897 meets the B871 road, marks the location of Kinbrace station. (Note: Ordnance Survey grid reference: NC862316; Mileage from Inverness: 118 mi 20 ch (190.3 km))

Beyond Kinbrace, in stark contrast to the rest of the line (and most of the Scottish Highlands), the topography of the surrounding area becomes flat and low-lying, and will remain so until the railway's two northern termini. The line carries on northwards alongside the A897 for seven and a half more miles (12.1 km) until it reaches Forsinard station (Note: Ordnance Survey grid reference: NC891425; Mileage from Inverness: 125 mi 69 ch (202.6 km)) which, despite its isolation, is not a request stop. With two platforms, this station is the last place on the line where passenger trains running in opposite directions can pass each other. The station serves the Forsinard Flows National Nature Reserve, among other nearby parts of the Flow Country; an RSPB visitor centre is adjacent to the station platforms. At Forsinard, the line crosses the A897, turns east-northeast, and does not meet another public road for over 17 miles (27 km). Soon, the line leaves the county of Sutherland and enters Caithness.

As the track passes through Caithness countryside, it eventually reaches Altnabreac station. (Note: Ordnance Survey grid reference: ND003457; Mileage from Inverness: 133 mi 76 ch (215.6 km)) This single-platform halt is often listed as one of Britain's most geographically isolated railway stations, being about 11 miles (18 km) from the nearest village and 6.8 miles (11 km) from the nearest paved road. There are, however, a handful of houses in the immediate vicinity of the station, accessed by a private dirt road, which is marked as a public cycle trail on Ordnance Survey maps.

The line then turns gently to the northeast, passing by several small lochs en route, before passing under the B870 road (the first public road close to the line since Forsinard). This is the site of Scotscalder station, (Note: Ordnance Survey grid reference: ND096560; Mileage from Inverness: 143 mi 02 ch (230.2 km)) which is among the least-used stations on the line, typically averaging less than 1 passenger per day. After another two and a half miles (4.0 km), the track passes south of Halkirk – the first unscattered village in over 44 route miles (71 km), although there is no longer a railway station serving it (the old station (Note: Ordnance Survey grid reference: ND133584; Mileage from Inverness: 145 mi 61 ch (234.6 km)) having closed in 1960 along with 19 others on the line). The line reaches its penultimate station, Georgemas Junction, (Note: Ordnance Survey grid reference: ND155593; Mileage from Inverness: 147 mi 20 ch (237.0 km); mileage from Georgemas Junction: 0 mi 0 ch (0 km)) at the point where the line crosses the A9 again. Adjoining the station on the south side is a freight terminal built in 2012 by Direct Rail Services; this was used by trains taking nuclear material from Dounreay to Sellafield.

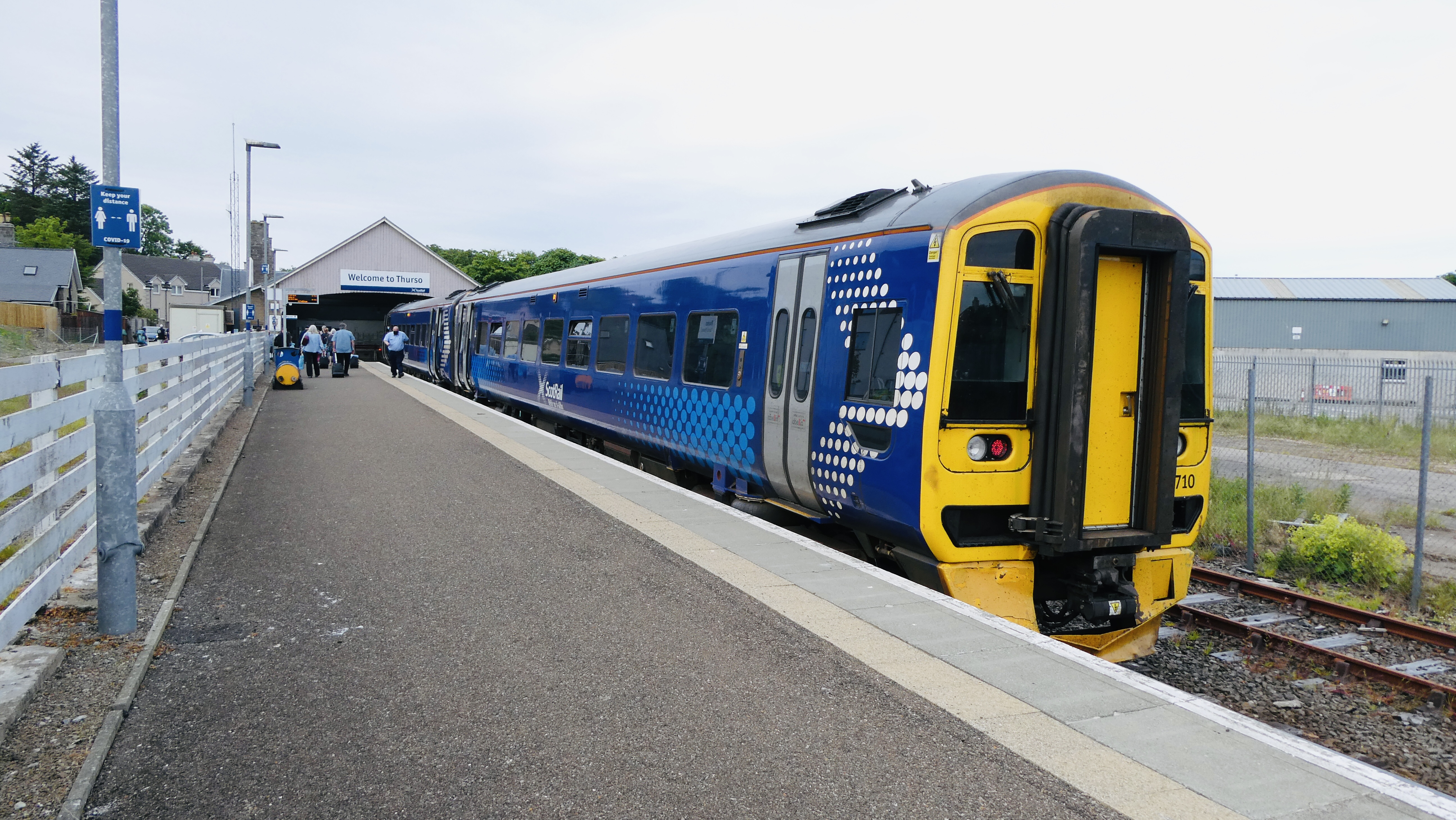
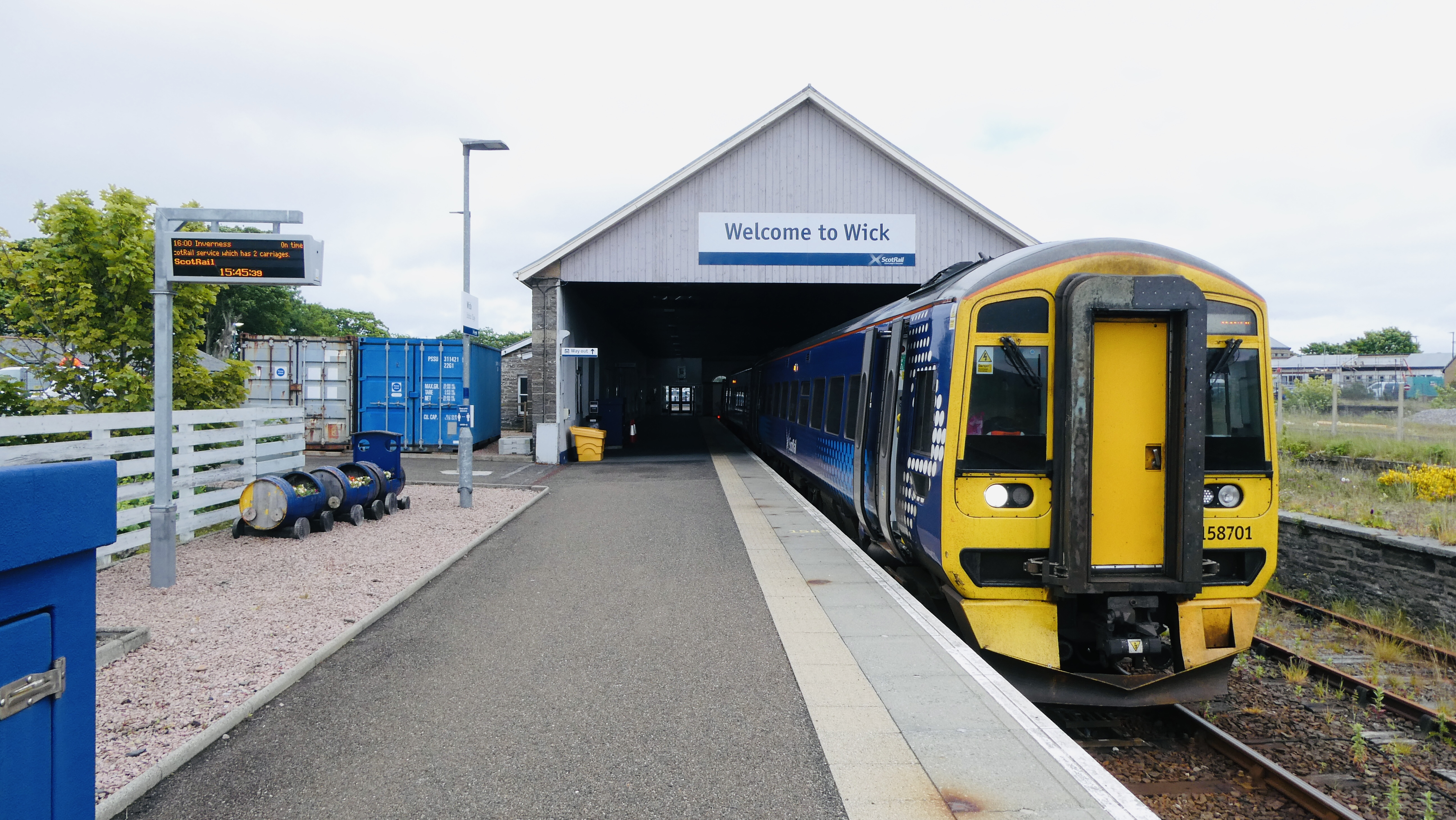
The two northern termini of the line at Thurso (top) and Wick (bottom) with near-identical station buildings

At Georgemas Junction, which is not a request stop, the lines to Thurso and Wick diverge; this is the northernmost railway junction in the United Kingdom. The Wick-facing Thurso branch curves north immediately west of the station and runs alongside the River Thurso, paralleling the A9 until it reaches Thurso station (Note: Ordnance Survey grid reference: ND113679; Mileage from Georgemas Junction: 6 mi 50 ch (10.7 km)) – the northernmost railway station in Britain, by the northern coast of Scotland. Thurso is the nearest station to the ferry terminal at Scrabster, which has ferry services to and from the town of Stromness in the Orkney Islands. Meanwhile, the main line to Wick continues in an east-southeasterly direction, sandwiched between the A882 and B874 roads, and terminates at Wick station (Note: Ordnance Survey grid reference: ND360509; Mileage from Inverness: 161 mi 35 ch (259.8 km)) on the east coast. At 18 miles 35 chains (29.7 km), the distance between Georgemas Junction and Wick is the longest between any two adjacent stations on the line, although three other stations existed along this stretch until 1960. Wick is the nearest station to Wick Airport as well as to the village of John o' Groats (approximately 17 miles (27 km) to the north) at the northeastern tip of mainland Britain, which is linked to the town by a bus service operated by Stagecoach Highlands.

== Infrastructure ==
The full line between Inverness and Wick (excluding the Thurso branch) is 161 miles 33 chains (259.8 km) long; the Thurso branch has a length of 6 miles 50 chains (10.7 km). The whole line is unelectrified. Despite its considerable length and passing through the mostly mountainous Scottish Highlands, there are no tunnels on the line.

The line is almost entirely single-track, but there are 10 double-track passing loops along the route, which allow trains to pass each other: these are at Muir of Ord, Dingwall, Invergordon, Tain, Ardgay, Lairg, Rogart, Brora, Helmsdale and Forsinard. The loops at Rogart and Brora are not timetabled to be the passing place for any scheduled passenger services, but they can be used as such during major disruption on the line.

The whole line north of the former Clunes station (about 7 miles (11 km) west of Inverness), together with the Kyle of Lochalsh line, are signalled using the Radio Electronic Token Block system, which is very cost-effective in both implementation and maintenance, but significantly limits the capacity of the lines.

=== "Press & Ride" request stops ===
Between 2022 and 2023, the Far North Line became the first railway line in the United Kingdom to implement a new "Press & Ride" system for its request stops.

Under the traditional system (still in use on the rest of the National Rail network), passengers wishing to board the train at a request stop had to flag the train by raising their arm; this meant that the driver needed to reduce the train's speed before a request stop (to look out for any potential passengers on the platform and be able to stop if necessary), even if the platform was empty. The new system, developed by Transport Scotland, envisaged the installation of an automatic kiosk (with a button for passengers to press) at each request stop. This alerts the driver about any waiting passengers in advance; if there is no requirement to stop, the train can maintain line speed through the station, thus improving reliability on the whole line.

The first of these kiosks was installed at Scotscalder on 15 August 2022 on a trial basis. Following the successful trial, the system was expanded on 20 December 2022 to cover five more request stops on the line, namely Culrain, Invershin, Rogart, Kildonan and Kinbrace. A further kiosk was added at Dunrobin Castle in May 2023. The last kiosk, at Altnabreac, was also expected to be in operation from spring 2023; however, this was delayed indefinitely, reportedly due to local homeowners blocking access to the station. The kiosk was finally installed in April 2025.

== History ==
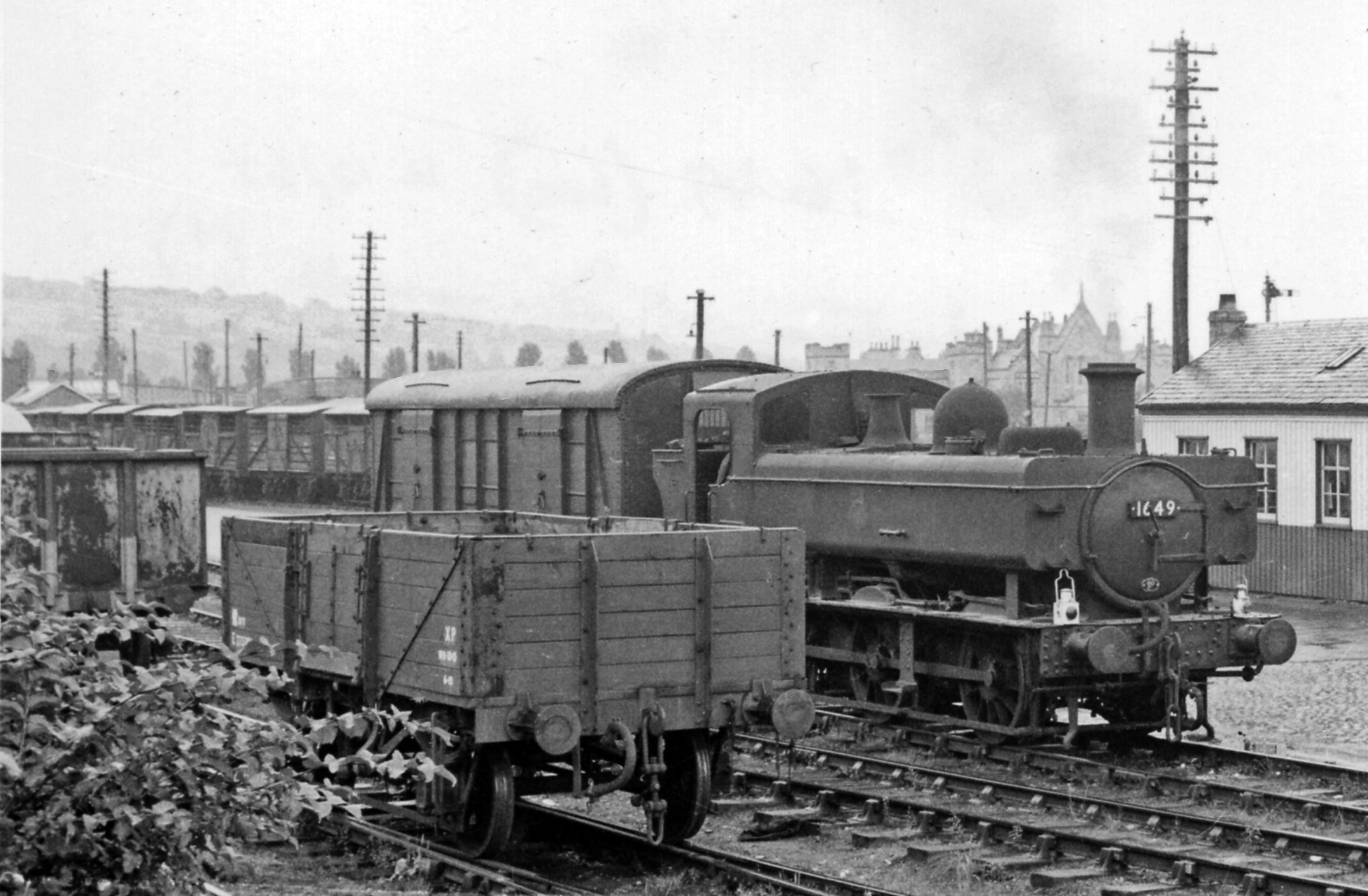
The steam engine from the Dornoch Branch shunting the goods yard at Dingwall

=== Pre-Nationalisation ===
The line was built in several stages:

- Inverness and Ross-shire Railway - Opened 11 June 1862 between Inverness and Ardgay
- Sutherland Railway - Opened 13 April 1868 between Ardgay and Golspie
- Duke of Sutherland's Railway - Opened 1 November 1870 between Golspie and Helmsdale
- Sutherland and Caithness Railway - Opened 28 July 1874 between Helmsdale and Wick / Thurso

Much of the work was done by the Inverness-based Highland Railway company or, when completed, taken over by that company. In 1923 the Highland Railway was grouped into the London, Midland and Scottish Railway, under the Railways Act 1921.

Like railway lines generally in Britain, the line was not a product of any strategic plan, but was an ad hoc development, facilitated by Private Acts of Parliament (which were themselves a significant expense for developers) and dependent on cooperation between companies and individuals, each with their own private vested interests. The line became strategically important during World War I and World War II as part of a supply route for Scapa Flow, Orkney.

That the line extends beyond Ardgay in the county of Ross and Cromarty is due, to a large extent, to the railway enthusiasm (some might say madness) of the 3rd Duke of Sutherland. The duke realised his dream of running his own private train to and from his own station at Dunrobin Castle.

The duke's enthusiasm took the line as far as Gartymore, a little south of Helmsdale, in the county of Sutherland, but this development was more of a financial liability than an asset: the long-term viability of the line then depended on a Caithness willingness, not least from the 17th Earl of Caithness, to link the line to the population centres of Wick and Thurso.

North of Helmsdale the line was built by the Sutherland and Caithness Railway. Turning inland, it reaches Forsinard in the Flow Country. The building of the line through the Flow Country – one of the most scarcely populated parts of Scotland – was to avoid the Berriedale Braes. North of Helmsdale as far as Lybster, it would have been impractical to build a railway without massive civil engineering projects. Thus coastal villages such as Latheron and Lybster are not served by the line.

In 1902, under the provisions of the Light Railways Act 1896, the standard gauge Wick and Lybster Railway was built along the east coast of Caithness, running south from Wick to Lybster. (Note: Ordnance Survey grid reference for Lybster: ND248363) This line was never profitable, and it closed in 1944.

Historic branch lines also served Dornoch and the Black Isle.

=== 1989–90 flooding ===
On 7 February 1989, Ness Viaduct, just west of Inverness station, collapsed in unprecedented flooding. The remaining 270 miles (430 km) of network to Kyle of Lochalsh and The Far North line had to be operated from a temporary maintenance site at Muir of Ord. A new viaduct was opened in time for the 1990 summer season on 14 May 1990.

== Services ==
=== Current passenger services ===
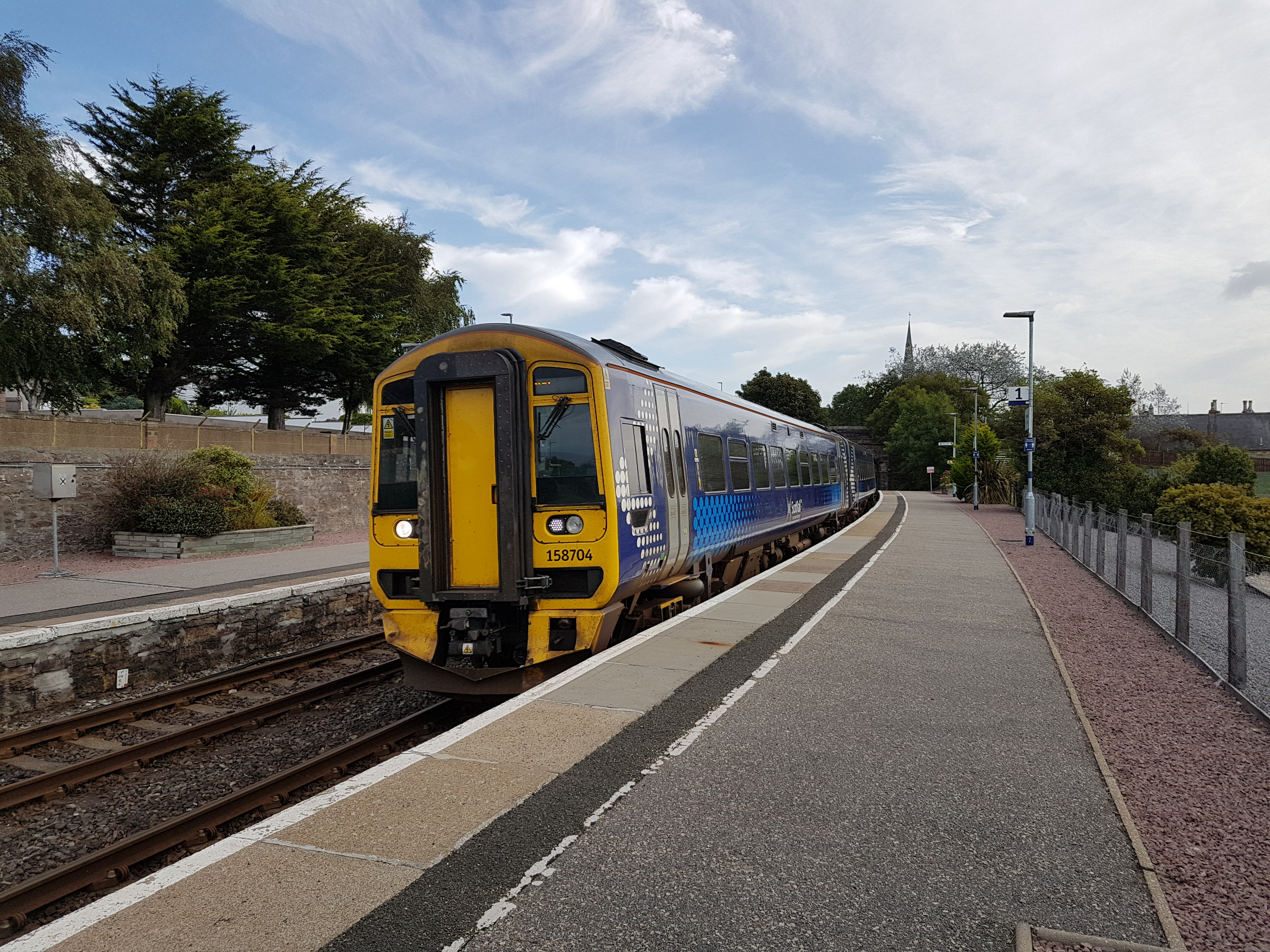
A train calling at Invergordon station

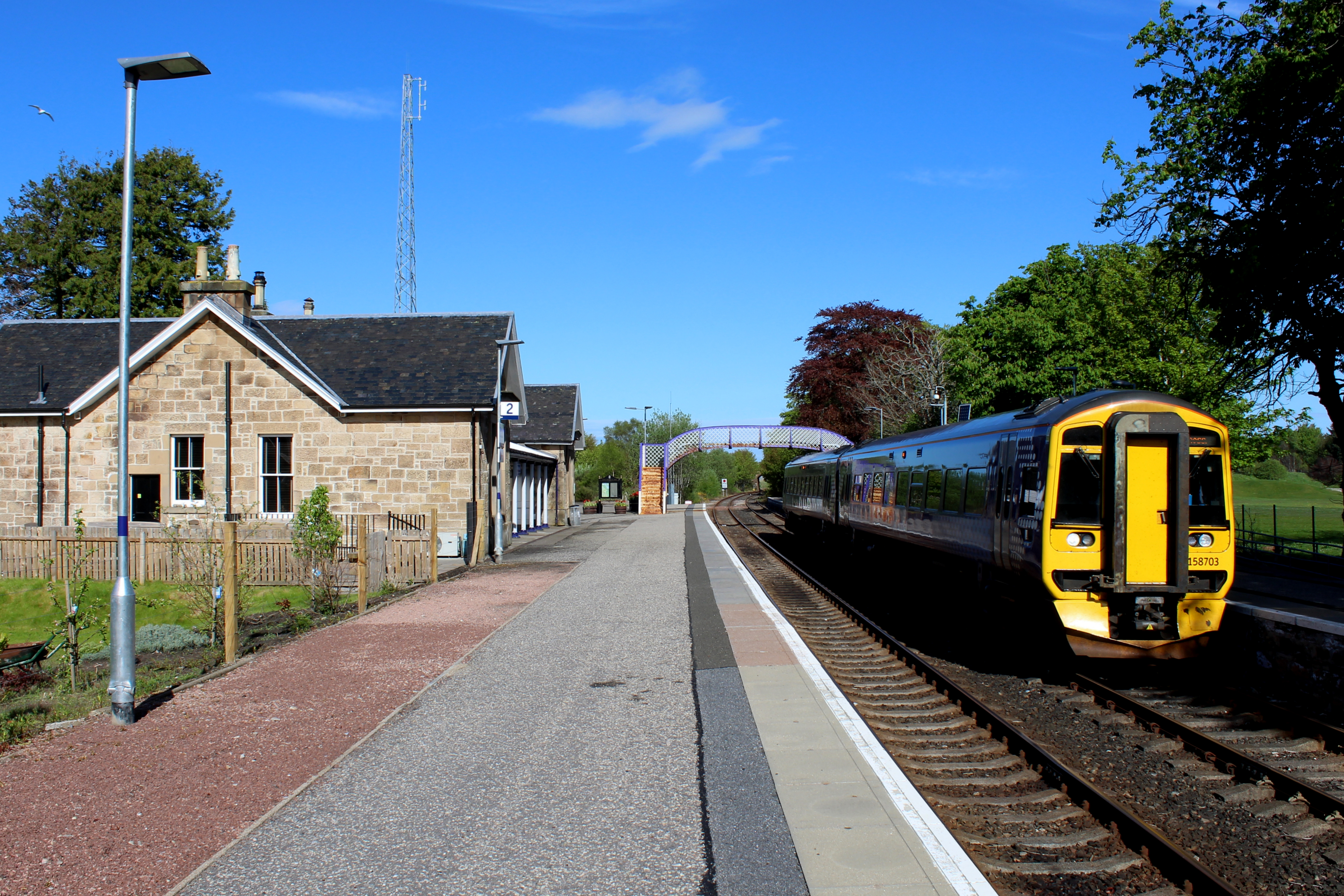
Tain station is the terminus for some Far North Line services.

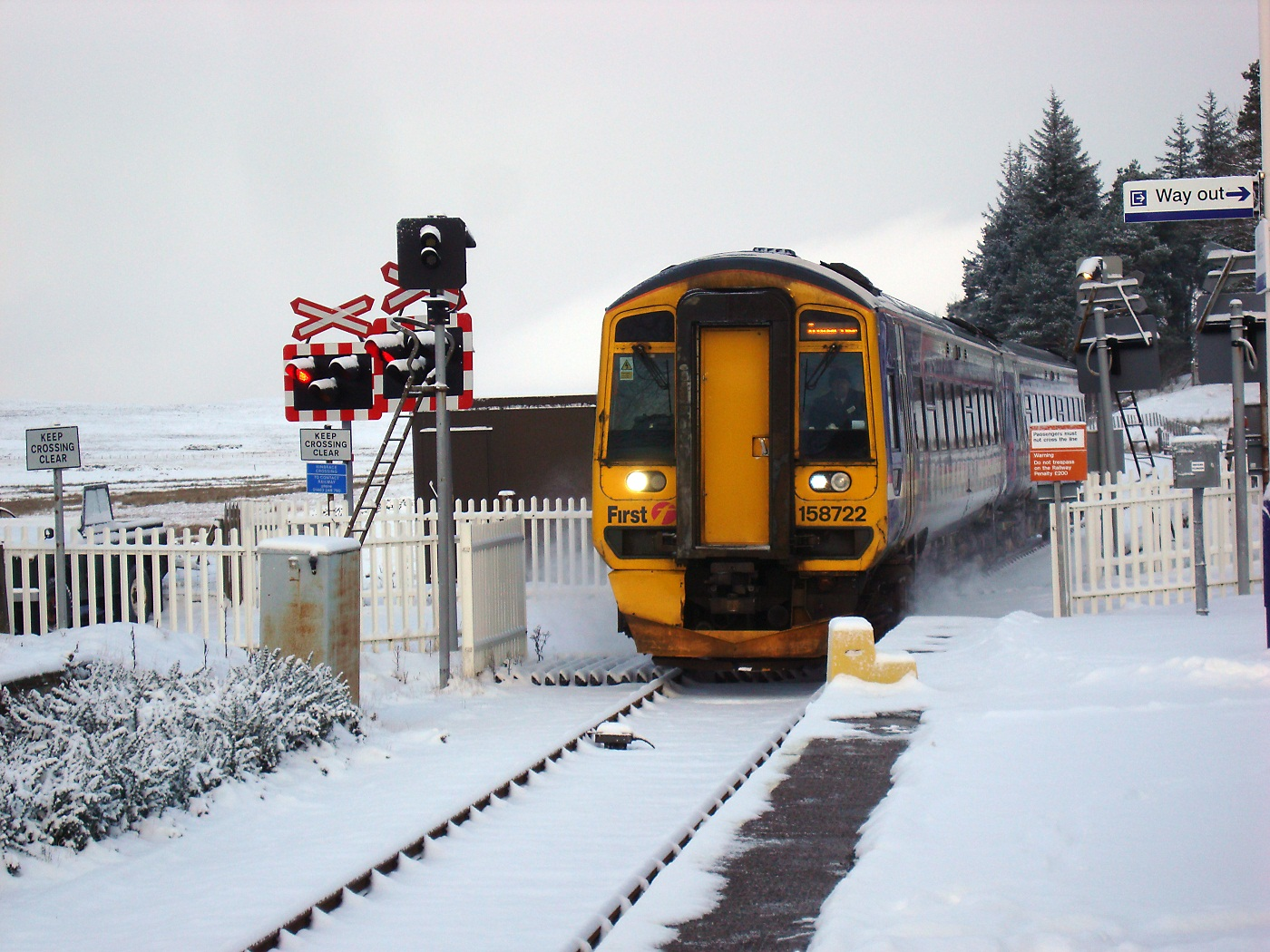
Kinbrace station is a request stop.

All passenger trains are operated by ScotRail using Class 158 "Express Sprinter" diesel multiple units. The exact stopping pattern varies between each station, as not all trains run the full length of the Far North Line. All passenger services on the line start or terminate at Inverness.

The service pattern is infrequent and very irregular, with intervals between consecutive trains at Inverness varying from just 15 minutes to as long as two-and-a-half hours. As of 2022, on weekdays (including Saturdays), there are 14 trains per day (tpd) arriving at Inverness from the north, and 12 northbound departures:

- 1 tpd each way shuttling to and from Dingwall only;
- 4 tpd to and from Kyle of Lochalsh (branching off the Far North Line at Dingwall);
- 1 tpd to and from Invergordon;
- 1 tpd to and from Tain;
- 2 tpd arriving from Ardgay with 1 tpd in the opposite direction;
- 1 tpd arriving from Lairg with no corresponding return service;
- 4 tpd running the full length to and from Wick via Thurso.

On Sundays the services are even less frequent, with just 1 tpd (2 in the summer) to/from Kyle of Lochalsh, 1 tpd to/from Invergordon, 3 tpd to/from Tain, and just a single train each way running all the way to/from Wick.

With the exception of some Wick services, (Note: One weekday southbound train from Wick runs non-stop through every request stop on the line except Kildonan and Rogart; * One weekday southbound service from Wick does not stop at Fearn, Alness, Conon Bridge or Beauly; * One weekday Wick-bound service does not call at Beauly or Conon Bridge; * In the summer, the last Wick-bound train of the day (including on Sundays) does not stop at Dunrobin Castle.) all trains are timetabled to stop at every intermediate station. Dunrobin Castle station is only open during the summer months; no services call there in the winter.

The stations at Culrain, Invershin, Rogart, Dunrobin Castle, Kildonan, Kinbrace, Altnabreac and Scotscalder are designated as request stops: passengers wishing to board the train at these stations must press a button at a designated kiosk on the platform, while those wishing to alight must inform the on-board guard to arrange for the train to stop. If there are no passengers wishing to get on or off the train, it will pass through without stopping.

Since 2000, trains to and from Wick have run via Thurso. On arrival at Georgemas Junction from Inverness, trains reverse to serve Thurso, then reverse again from Thurso to run back to Georgemas Junction (stopping there for a second time) and continue on to Wick. This procedure is mirrored for Inverness-bound services.

Services between Inverness and Wick typically have a journey time of about 4 hours 20 minutes end-to-end.

=== Freight ===
Georgemas Junction has been used for freight handling and had a new railhead opened in 2012 for the transportation of nuclear flasks, but the terminal has not attracted any commercial operators since. In 2020, a trial project funded by a £195,000 grant from the Scottish Government saw timber transported from Georgemas Junction to a processing facility near Inverness by Victa Railfreight.

=== Previous services ===
==== 1923–1948 (London Midland and Scottish Railway) ====
The London, Midland and Scottish Railway introduced two titled trains in 1936, the Orcadian and John O'Groat.

==== 1948–1997 (British Rail Scottish Region) ====
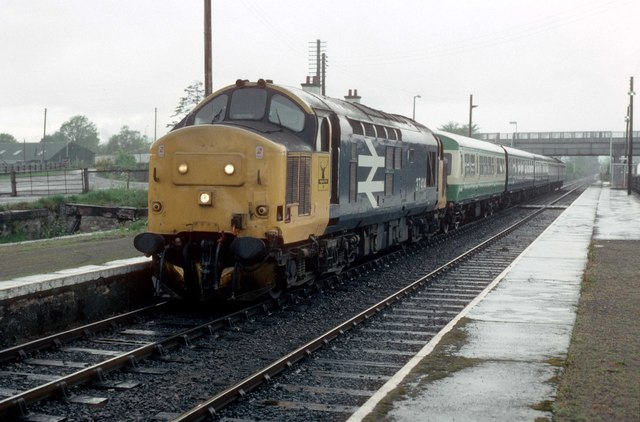
A Class 37 at Muir of Ord in 1988

In 1963, the line was listed for closure on the Beeching Report; however, the Far North Line remained open due to pressure from protesters.

Following the elimination of steam traction by the early 1960s, trains on the line were normally hauled by Inverness allocated Class 24 diesel locomotives (D5114-32), then subsequently by Class 26 diesel locomotives. In the 1980s these were replaced by more powerful Class 37 locomotives, still with Mark 1 rolling stock. These were replaced by Class 156s in the 1990s by British Rail. Three trains each way per day (Mon-Sat) was the standard service pattern at this time.

==== 1997–2004 (ScotRail) ====
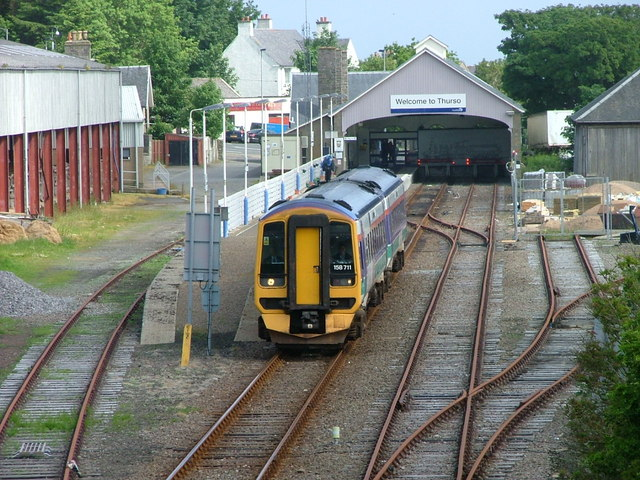
A Class 158 leaving Thurso with a service to Inverness

The service provided by ScotRail replicated that provided in the latter years of BR Scottish Region. ScotRail was owned by ScotRail (National Express) until 17 October 2004 when First ScotRail took over the franchise.

Until 2000, when the line was served by Class 156s, trains to Caithness were split at Georgemas Junction – one half of the train would continue to Thurso and the other to Wick. This practice ended when Class 158s were introduced on the line, adopting the current calling pattern.

==== 2005–2015 (First ScotRail) ====
Along the full length of the line there were four services each way Monday to Saturday, including a service allowing a connection from the Orkney ferry, and one service each way on Sundays. In the Winter 2008/9 timetable the number of trains to and from Wick was increased to four each way on Mondays to Saturdays.

First ScotRail also operated a number of shorter distance services on the line from Inverness terminating at Dingwall and Ardgay, as an alternative commuter route to Inverness in addition to the A9 road.

== Passenger volumes ==
Passenger volumes on the Far North Line (Stations in italics are request stops)
Entries and exits	2002-03	2004-05	2005-06	2006-07	2007-08	2008-09	2009-10	2010-11	2011-12	2012-13	2013-14	2014-15	2015-16	2016-17	2017-18	2018-19	2019-20	2020-21	2021-22	2022-23
Inverness	721,358	822,928	873,011	915,840	975,570	1,043,712	1,070,924	1,127,718	1,180,160	1,213,382	1,282,445	1,303,662	1,306,556	1,259,496	1,238,770	1,243,338	1,214,648	231,894	753,228	974,808
Beauly	21,337	26,616	28,384	35,860	41,878	52,422	51,094	49,858	54,536	55,236	57,946	57,446	59,406	52,870	51,522	48,270	46,510	14,918	30,178	36,588
Muir of Ord	22,055	24,365	24,783	32,573	39,200	51,104	57,396	62,428	74,462	74,064	72,832	66,576	66,480	64,480	64,820	67,554	70,850	13,556	41,230	47,688
Conon Bridge (Note: Did not open until February 2013.)	0	0	0	0	0	0	0	0	0	3,788	18,114	15,510	15,276	15,494	15,100	17,530	18,022	2,598	9,212	10,898
Dingwall	31,849	34,898	43,508	55,034	64,404	72,086	80,324	84,920	101,730	104,746	101,996	87,782	82,508	80,900	86,276	81,408	80,154	9,864	46,524	55,536
Alness	3,717	6,950	7,633	9,822	11,550	13,722	14,306	17,782	25,498	28,384	27,796	25,934	23,614	26,376	29,272	30,426	27,050	3,220	15,810	16,804
Invergordon	7,069	8,109	9,195	12,949	15,853	19,974	20,648	23,444	34,564	34,974	36,355	31,962	29,054	27,886	28,958	28,806	27,826	3,134	13,308	18,758
Fearn	1,909	5,157	5,143	6,069	5,581	7,724	6,790	6,720	7,818	7,226	6,606	6,130	5,396	5,262	5,256	4,304	4,182	850	2,980	3,754
Tain	10,883	11,174	13,837	18,521	20,847	23,922	24,340	26,944	33,638	34,016	34,578	30,004	27,896	28,622	29,774	29,384	28,036	3,522	19,664	19,606
Ardgay	2,503	2,297	3,067	3,964	5,851	6,516	7,388	7,404	8,890	8,108	8,806	8,416	6,732	7,144	7,140	6,998	6,408	624	3,968	4,412
Culrain	1,756	2,016	1,707	1,771	1,785	1,886	1,722	1,708	526	474	628	530	432	372	300	280	312	42	164	304
Invershin	287	229	408	199	310	220	282	512	386	690	790	486	706	826	438	284	216	50	210	232
Lairg	4,326	4,096	4,126	3,724	4,790	5,280	5,542	6,098	6,330	6,176	7,440	7,514	6,592	5,576	5,426	6,016	6,264	742	2,960	3,348
Rogart	1,503	1,633	1,645	1,356	1,472	1,538	1,844	1,456	1,736	1,662	1,662	1,522	1,710	1,948	1,630	1,574	1,656	150	992	884
Golspie	7,032	7,530	7,429	6,956	7,587	9,154	8,486	8,092	6,852	7,550	7,788	6,770	5,192	5,718	5,786	6,150	5,586	576	4,536	4,056
Dunrobin Castle	191	299	357	357	423	572	488	594	628	628	916	822	782	882	1,030	1,224	1,240	114	770	1,428
Brora	4,024	3,462	3,483	3,277	3,723	4,660	5,614	5,780	5,164	5,556	6,380	5,616	5,524	5,616	5,994	6,992	6,354	648	4,722	4,594
Helmsdale	3,972	3,513	3,514	4,456	5,348	5,646	5,680	5,656	6,086	5,828	5,778	5,096	6,204	5,768	4,636	5,044	5,086	564	3,168	3,484
Kildonan	89	145	165	231	244	174	204	142	240	62	144	96	170	76	206	168	214	16	140	148
Kinbrace	754	518	562	537	737	792	410	448	778	1,090	1,092	528	456	464	376	510	456	44	370	436
Forsinard	1,432	1,674	1,497	1,098	1,256	1,836	1,496	1,770	1,970	2,088	1,718	1,456	1,516	2,124	2,210	2,530	2,866	160	660	936
Altnabreac	93	164	171	222	177	212	156	172	238	296	138	240	312	356	658	408	232	46	230	280
Scotscalder	208	187	212	142	212	256	184	246	214	460	376	388	294	200	182	238	232	18	116	124
Georgemas Junction	1,129	1,108	1,018	989	893	1,500	1,482	1,630	1,682	1,906	1,652	1,696	1,572	1,502	1,320	1,576	1,570	234	1,032	1,318
Thurso	38,112	37,338	35,083	32,906	37,064	43,450	47,792	48,172	48,090	46,024	43,802	42,082	38,426	37,322	39,174	39,974	39,702	6,474	25,200	31,446
Wick	19,566	19,582	19,079	17,321	20,202	21,708	24,454	25,666	24,838	22,788	21,884	21,442	19,766	18,438	17,546	17,890	16,664	3,442	12,980	14,924

The statistics cover twelve-month periods that start in April.

== Future ==
=== Electrification ===
In the Scottish Government's National Transport Strategy, published in February 2020, it was stated that the section between Inverness and Tain would be electrified with overhead lines by 2035; an alternative to diesel traction – ostensibly hydrogen – would be used for the remainder of the route.

=== Delmore Loop ===
There are plans to construct a new passing loop between Inverness and Beauly.

=== Proposals ===
==== Lairg loop bypass ====
For many years there have been proposals to bypass the Lairg loop with a line across the Dornoch Firth, linking Tain more directly with Golspie via Dornoch. British Rail attempted to get funding for this when the road bridge was built, but the government declined. On 6 March 1987 the government confirmed that it would not fund the project.

This project would involve building a new bridge over the Dornoch Firth, or making the existing A9 road bridge dual-purpose. Discussions have been held concerning the shortening of the Far North Line involving a bridge over the Firth and the possible use of the trackbed of the former light railway; however, there have been no confirmed plans for such a shortcut to date.

==== New stations ====
Following the successful campaigns to reopen the previously closed stations at Beauly in 2002 and at Conon Bridge in 2013, there have been several proposals to reopen more stations on the line. One campaign, supported by the Highland Council and HITRANS, seeks to build a new station at Evanton (between Dingwall and Alness), which was closed in 1960. The Friends of the Far North Line campaign group, meanwhile, proposes the reopening of Halkirk station near Georgemas Junction; it also looks into the possibility of constructing a new curve of track at Georgemas so that trains could serve the Thurso branch directly, without having to reverse at Georgemas Junction station.
