= Shin Railway Viaduct =

Bridge in Highlands, Scotland

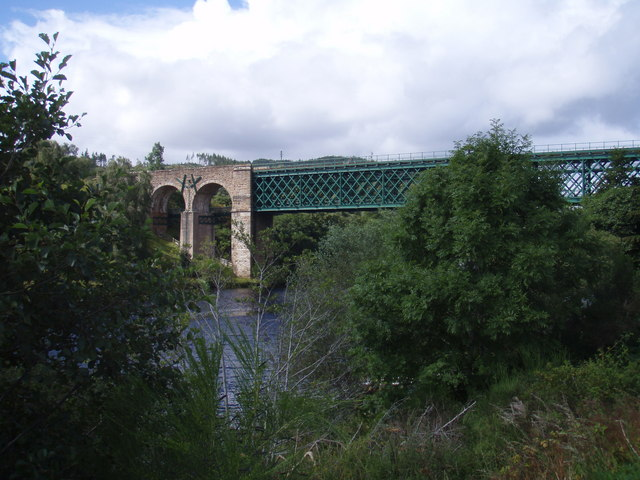
- Bridges crossing the Kyle of Sutherland
- Coordinates: 57.924022°N 4.401109°W
- Carries: Far North Line
- Crosses: Kyle of Sutherland

Characteristics
- Longest span: 230 feet (70 m)

History
- Designer: Joseph Mitchell and Murdoch Paterson
- Construction end: 1868

Listed Building – Category A
- Official name: Shin Viaduct Over Kyle of Sutherland
- Designated: 17 March 1971
- Reference no.: LB279

Location
- Interactive map of Shin Railway Viaduct

The Shin Railway Viaduct (also known as the Invershin Viaduct or Oykel Viaduct) is a railway viaduct that crosses the Kyle of Sutherland.The viaduct carries the Far North Line between Inverness and Wick and Thurso. Invershin railway station is at the north-eastern end of the viaduct, while Culrain railway station is a short distance to the south.

== History ==
It was built for the Sutherland Railway by engineers Joseph Mitchell and Murdoch Paterson.

The railway opened to traffic on 13 April 1868.

== Design ==
It crosses the river with a single 230 feet (70 m) span, 20 feet (6.1 m) longer than that used at the Dalguise Viaduct by Mitchell four years earlier. The deck which carries the track sits on top of rather than between the truss girders. There are two semicircular stone arches in the approach viaduct to the south, and three to the north.

A footbridge was added to the northern side of the viaduct in 2000. This is now part of National Cycle Network Route 1.

== See also ==
- List of bridges in Scotland
