= Invershin railway station =

Railway station in Highland, Scotland

Invershin Scottish Gaelic: Inbhir Sin
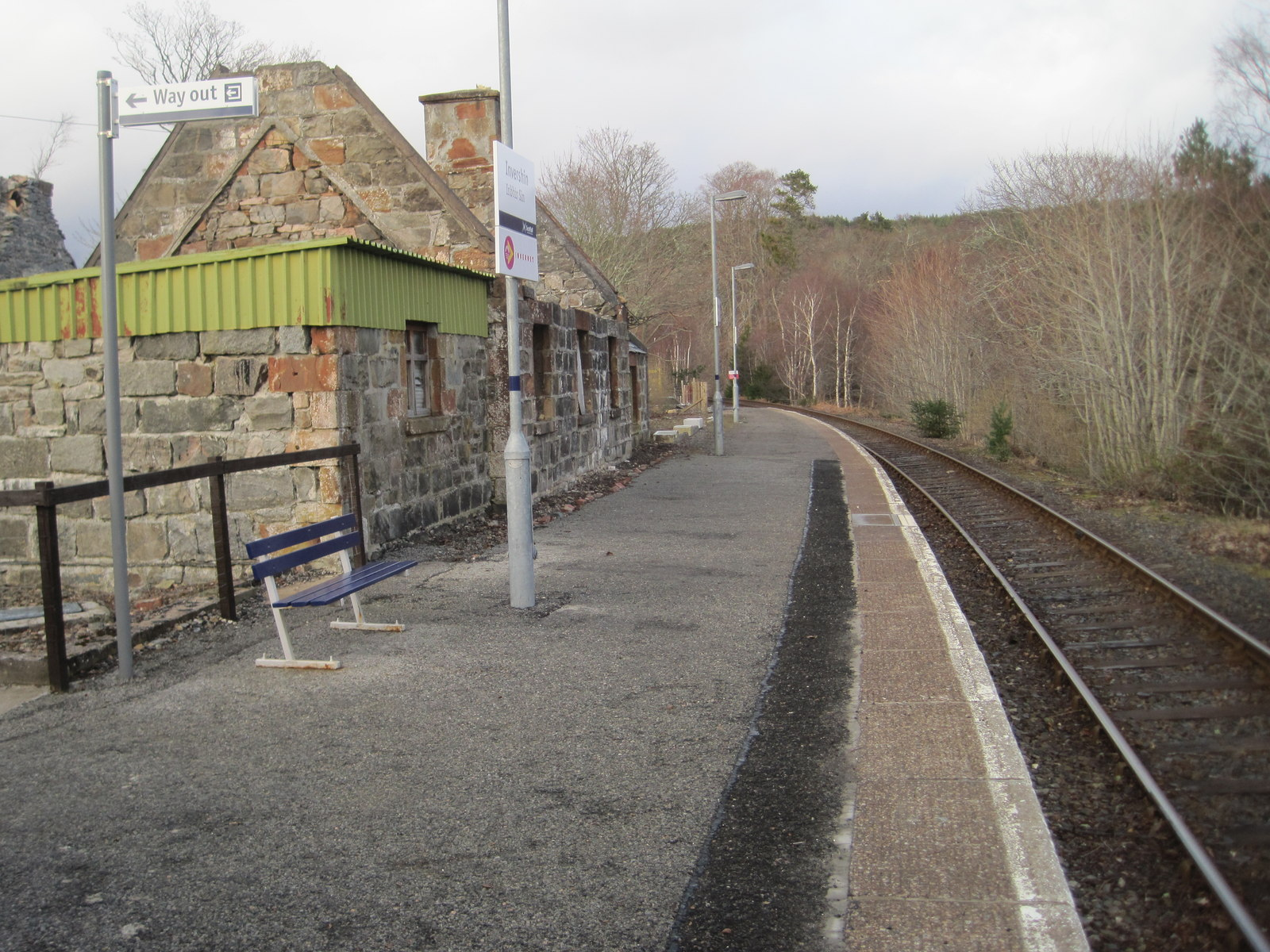

General information
- Location: Invershin, Highland; Scotland
- Coordinates: 57.9249°N 4.3995°W
- Grid reference: NH579953
- Manager: ScotRail
- Platforms: 1

Other information
- Station code: INH

History
- Original company: Sutherland Railway
- Pre-grouping: Highland Railway
- Post-grouping: LMSR

Key dates
- 13 April 1868: Opened

Passengers
- 2021/22: ▲210
- 2022/23: ▲232
- 2023/24: ▲440
- 2024/25: ▼362
- 2025/26: ▲548
Location
Notes
- Passenger statistics from the Office of Rail and Road

Invershin railway station is a railway station in the Highland council area of Scotland. The station is on the Far North Line, 61 miles 34 chains (98.9 km) from Inverness, between Culrain and Lairg. ScotRail, who manage the station, operate all services.

== History ==
The station opened on 13 April 1868, as part of the Sutherland Railway, later becoming part of the Highland Railway and later the London, Midland and Scottish Railway.

== Location ==
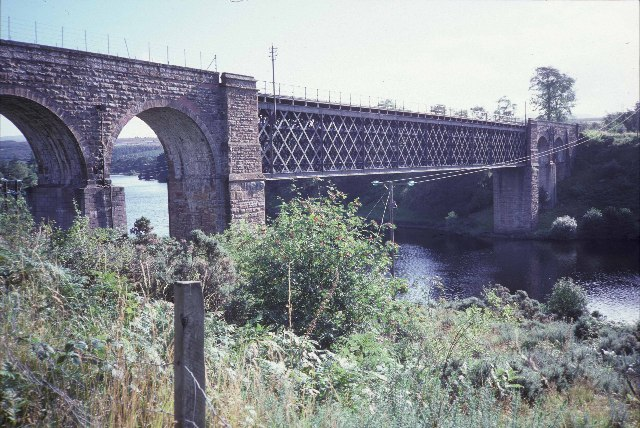
Shin Viaduct

It is extremely close to the previous station on the line, at Culrain, situated at the opposite side of Shin Viaduct (or 'Oykel Viaduct'), a major structure on the Far North line which crosses the Kyle of Sutherland.

== Facilities ==
Invershin only has very basic facilities, being a waiting shelter, a help point and bike racks. As there are no facilities to purchase tickets, passengers must buy one in advance, or from the guard on the train.

On 20 December 2022, Transport Scotland introduced a new "Press & Ride" system at Invershin, following successful trials of the system at Scotscalder over the previous four months. Previously, passengers wishing to board a train at Invershin had to flag the train by raising their arm (as is still done at other request stops around the country); this meant that the driver needed to reduce the train's speed before a request stop (to look out for any potential passengers on the platform and be able to stop if necessary), even if the platform was empty. The new system consists of an automatic kiosk (with a button for passengers to press) at the platform; this will alert the driver about any waiting passengers in advance and, if there is no requirement to stop, the train can maintain line speed through the request stops, thus improving reliability on the whole line.

== Passenger volume ==
Passenger Volume at Invershin
| | 2004–05 | 2005–06 | 2006–07 | 2007–08 | 2008–09 | 2009–10 | 2010–11 | 2011–12 | 2012–13 | 2013–14 | 2014–15 | 2015–16 | 2016–17 | 2017–18 | 2018–19 | 2019–20 | 2020–21 | 2021–22 | 2022–23 | 2023–24 | 2024–25 |
|---|---|---|---|---|---|---|---|---|---|---|---|---|---|---|---|---|---|---|---|---|---|
| Entries and exits | 229 | 408 | 199 | 310 | 220 | 282 | 512 | 386 | 690 | 790 | 486 | 706 | 826 | 438 | 284 | 216 | 50 | 210 | 232 | 440 | 362 |

The statistics cover twelve month periods that start in April.

== Services ==
In the May 2026 timetable, four trains call at Invershin each way (four to Inverness, four to Wick via Thurso) on weekdays and Saturdays. On Sundays, there is just one train each way.

This station is designated as a request stop. This means that passengers intending to alight must inform the guard in advance, and any passengers wishing to board must press a "request" button located at the kiosk on the platform.

| Preceding station | National Rail | Following station |
|---|---|---|
| Culrain | ScotRail; Far North Line | Lairg |

== Bibliography ==
- Quick, Michael (2022). Railway Passenger Stations in Great Britain: A Chronology (PDF) (5th ed.). London: Railway and Canal Historical Society.
