= Ardgay railway station =

Railway station in Highland, Scotland

Ardgay Scottish Gaelic: Àird Ghaoithe
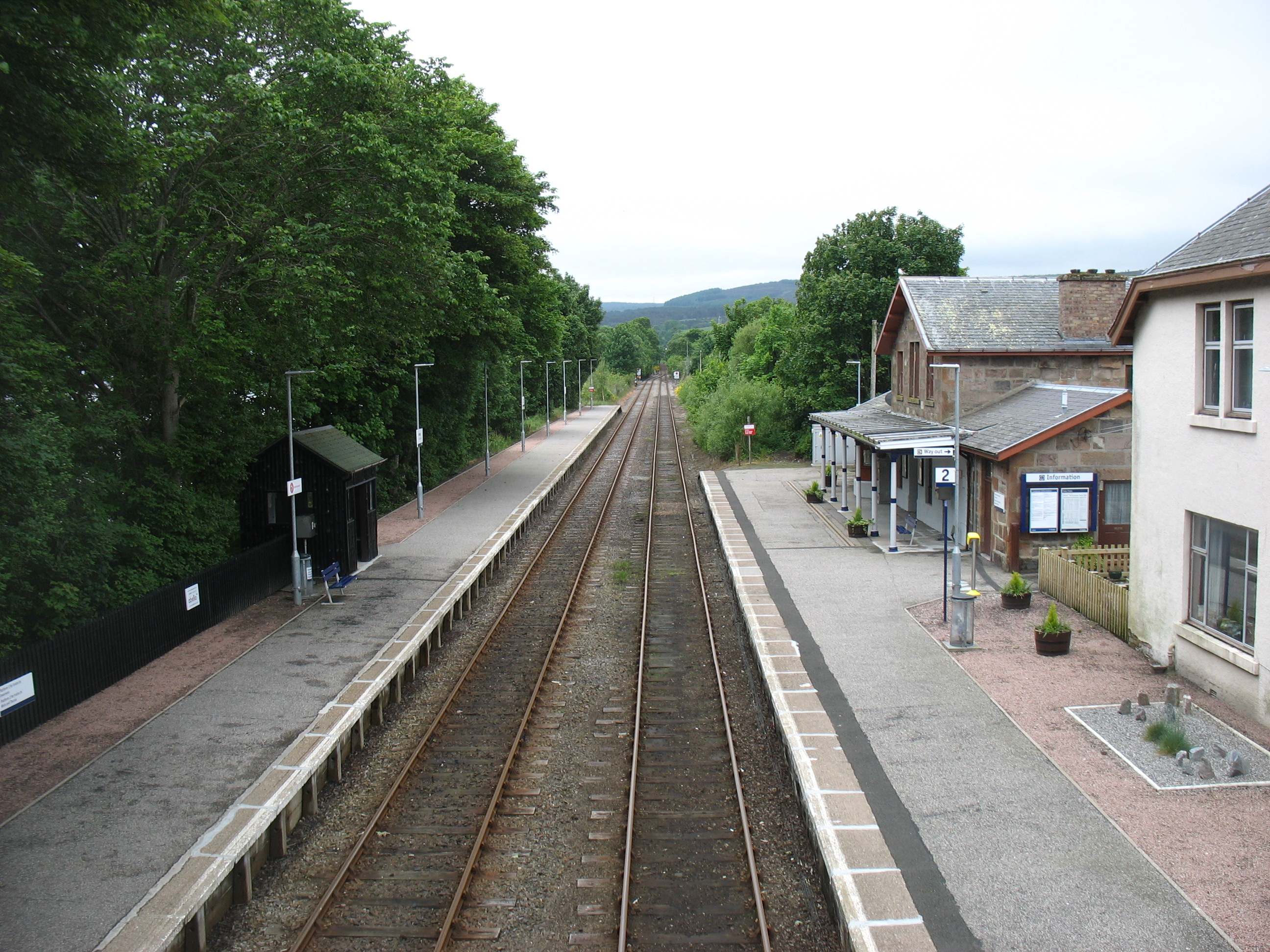
- The platforms at Ardgay station, looking south

General information
- Location: Ardgay, Highland; Scotland
- Coordinates: 57.8816°N 4.3622°W
- Grid reference: NH600904
- Manager: ScotRail
- Platforms: 2

Other information
- Station code: ARD

History
- Original company: Inverness and Ross-shire Railway / Sutherland Railway
- Pre-grouping: Highland Railway
- Post-grouping: LMSR

Key dates
- 1 October 1864: Opened as Bonar Bridge
- 2 May 1977: Renamed as Ardgay

Passengers
- 2021/22: ▲3,968
- 2022/23: ▲4,412
- 2023/24: ▲5,674
- 2024/25: ▲5,734
- 2025/26: ▼5,322

Listed Building – Category C(S)
- Designated: 14 September 1988
- Reference no.: LB7164
Location
Notes
- Passenger statistics from the Office of Rail and Road

Ardgay railway station is a railway station serving the village of Ardgay and its neighbour Bonar Bridge in the Highland council area of Scotland. The station is on the Far North Line, 57 miles 70 chains (93.1 km) from Inverness, between Tain and Culrain. ScotRail, who manage the station, operate all services.

== History ==
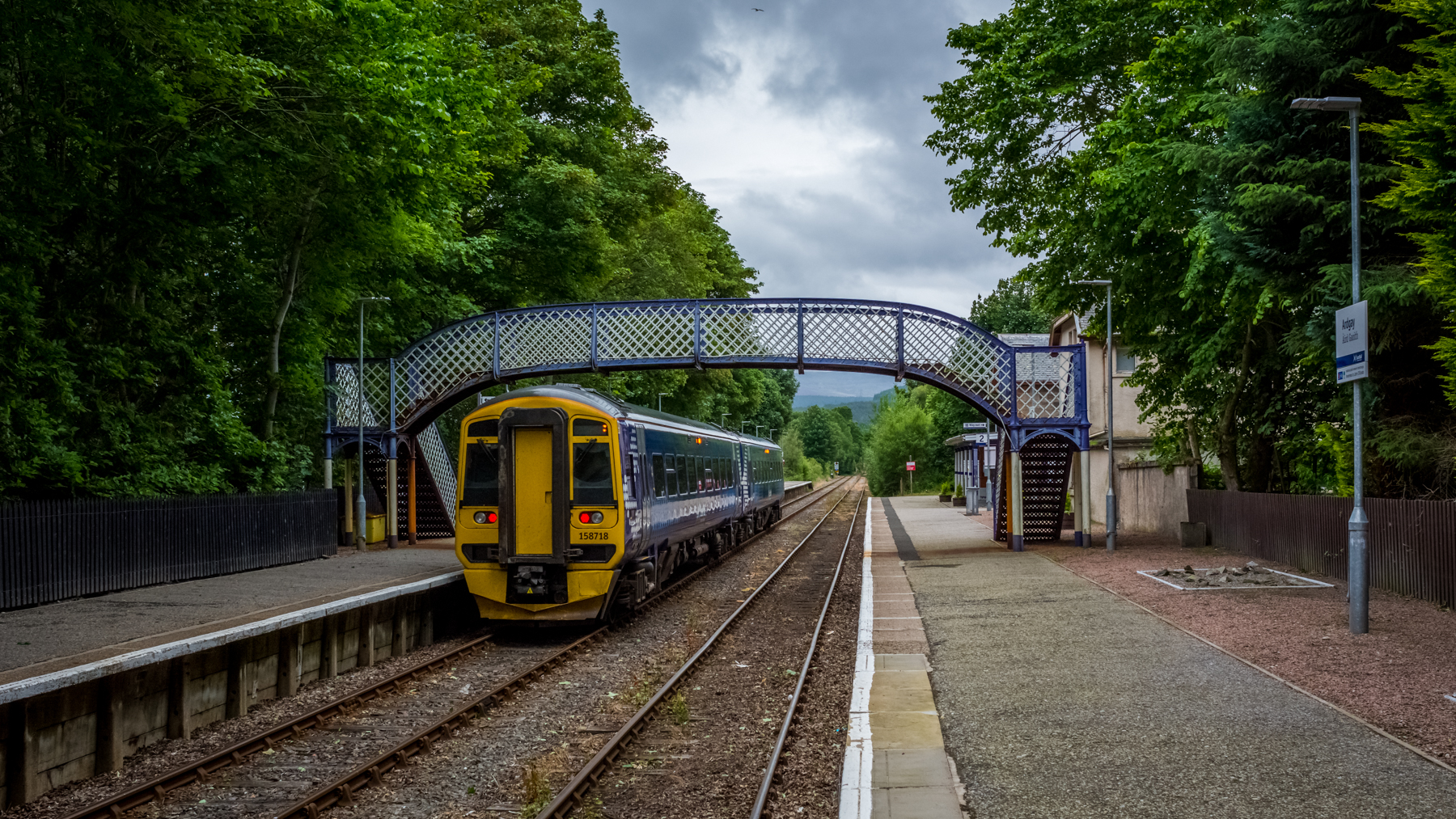
A ScotRail Class 158 standing at Ardgay with a service bound for Inverness

Opened on 1 October 1864 as Bonar Bridge by the Inverness and Aberdeen Junction Railway and designed by Joseph Mitchell, it became the meeting point of the Sutherland Railway and the Inverness and Ross-shire Railway. It was renamed Ardgay on 2 May 1977.

In October 2025, The station underwent a major upgrade through investment by Network Rail.

== Platform layout ==
The station has a passing loop 32 chains (640 m) long, flanked by two platforms. Platform 1 on the southbound line can accommodate trains having ten coaches, but platform 2 on the northbound line can only hold five.

== Facilities ==
Both platforms have benches, but only platform 1 has a designated waiting area, as seen in the photo on the left. Platform 2 also has a help point, and there is a car park and bike racks adjacent to it. Platform 2 has step-free access, but platform 1 can only be accessed from the footbridge. As there are no facilities to purchase tickets, passengers must buy one in advance, or from the guard on the train.

== Passenger volume ==
Passenger Volume at Ardgay
	2004–05	2005–06	2006–07	2007–08	2008–09	2009–10	2010–11	2011–12	2012–13	2013–14	2014–15	2015–16	2016–17	2017–18	2018–19	2019–20	2020–21	2021–22	2022–23	2023–24	2024–25
Entries and exits	2,297	3,067	3,964	5,851	6,516	7,388	7,404	8,890	8,108	8,806	8,416	6,732	7,144	7,140	6,998	6,408	624	3,968	4,412	5,674	5,734

The statistics cover twelve month periods that start in April.

== Services ==
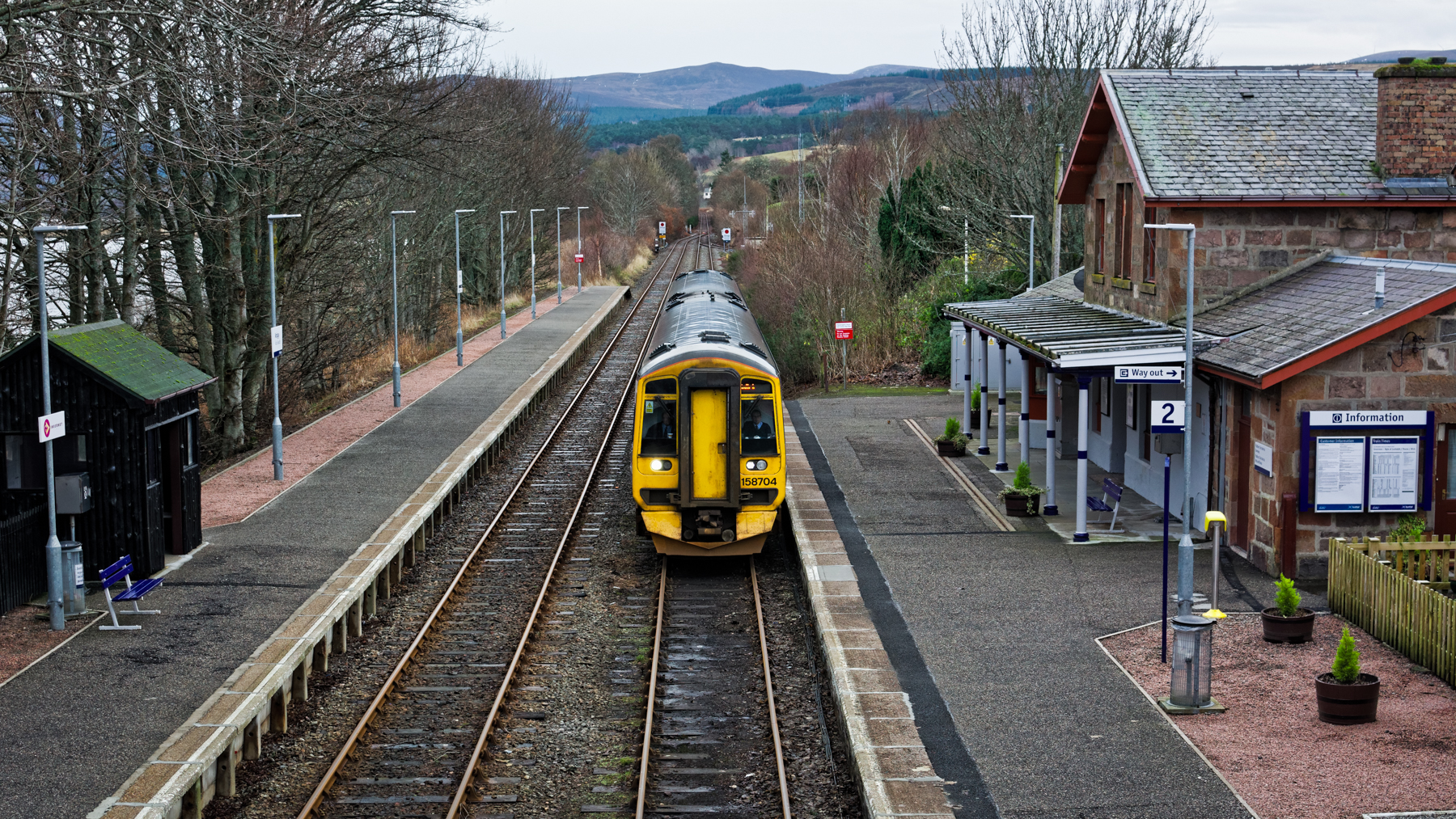
A ScotRail Class 158 arriving at Ardgay with a service bound for Wick

On Mondays to Saturdays, there are seven trains a day southbound to Inverness and five a day northbound, four of which continue on to Wick (the other terminates here). On Sundays, there is one train in each direction.

Preceding station	National Rail	Following station
Tain	ScotRail; Far North Line	Culrain or Lairg or Terminates here
	Historical railways	
Mid Fearn Halt; Line open; Station closed	Highland Railway; Inverness and Ross-shire Railway; Sutherland Railway	Culrain; Line and Station open

== Bibliography ==
- Brailsford, Martyn, ed. (December 2017) [1987]. Railway Track Diagrams 1: Scotland & Isle of Man (6th ed.). Frome: Trackmaps. ISBN 978-0-9549866-9-8.
- Butt, R. V. J. (October 1995). The Directory of Railway Stations: details every public and private passenger station, halt, platform and stopping place, past and present (1st ed.). Sparkford: Patrick Stephens Ltd. ISBN 978-1-85260-508-7. OCLC 60251199. OL 11956311M.
- Jowett, Alan (March 1989). Jowett's Railway Atlas of Great Britain and Ireland: From Pre-Grouping to the Present Day (1st ed.). Sparkford: Patrick Stephens Ltd. ISBN 978-1-85260-086-0. OCLC 22311137.
- Quick, Michael (2022). Railway Passenger Stations in Great Britain: A Chronology (PDF) (5th ed.). London: Railway and Canal Historical Society.
