= Orcadian (train) =

Overview
- Service type: Passenger train
- First service: April 1936
- Former operator(s): London, Midland and Scottish Railway; British Railways

Route
- Termini: Inverness; Wick
- Service frequency: Daily
- Line(s) used: Far North Line

The Orcadian was a named passenger train operating in the United Kingdom. The train was run by LMS.

== History ==
The service was introduced in April 1936 by the London, Midland and Scottish Railway. It was given to the 6.30 am train from Inverness, and the return service from Wick at 3.35 pm.

The train was retained in the era of British Rail and in 1964 offered a journey time of four hours, compared with other services on the line taking five hours.
