= Lairg railway station =

Railway station in Highland, Scotland

Lairg Scottish Gaelic: Luirg
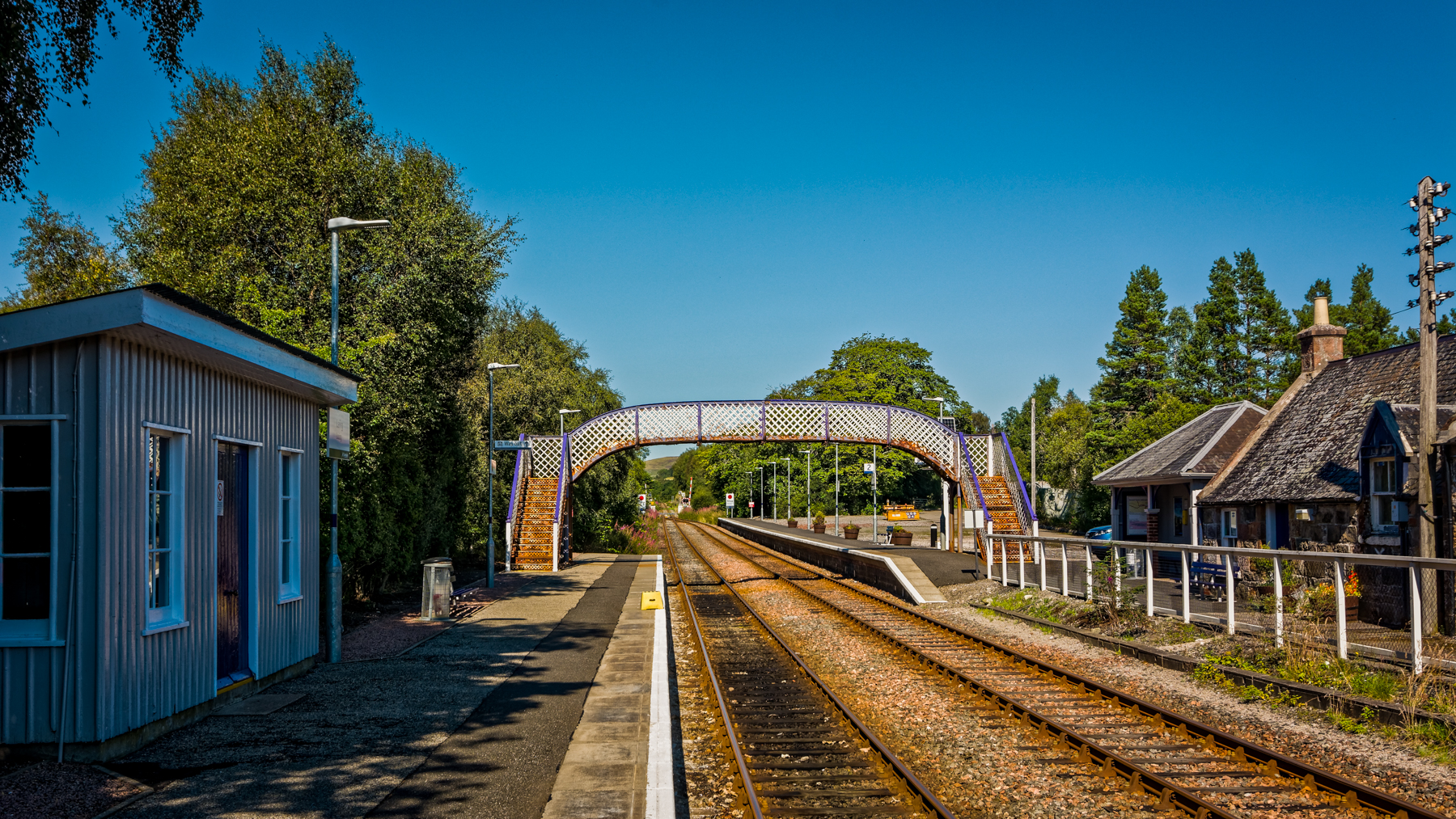
- The view northward in 2016

General information
- Location: Lairg, Highland; Scotland
- Coordinates: 58.0019°N 4.3998°W
- Grid reference: NC582039
- Manager: ScotRail
- Platforms: 2

Other information
- Station code: LRG

History
- Original company: Sutherland Railway
- Pre-grouping: Highland Railway
- Post-grouping: LMSR

Key dates
- 13 April 1868: Opened

Passengers
- 2021/22: ▲2,960
- 2022/23: ▲3,348
- 2023/24: ▲4,180
- 2024/25: ▼3,978
- 2025/26: ▼3,798
Location
Notes
- Passenger statistics from the Office of Rail and Road

Lairg railway station is a railway station just south of the village of Lairg in the Highland council area of Scotland. The station is on the Far North Line, 66 miles 78 chains (107.8 km) from Inverness, between Invershin and Rogart. ScotRail, who manages the station, operates all services.

== History ==
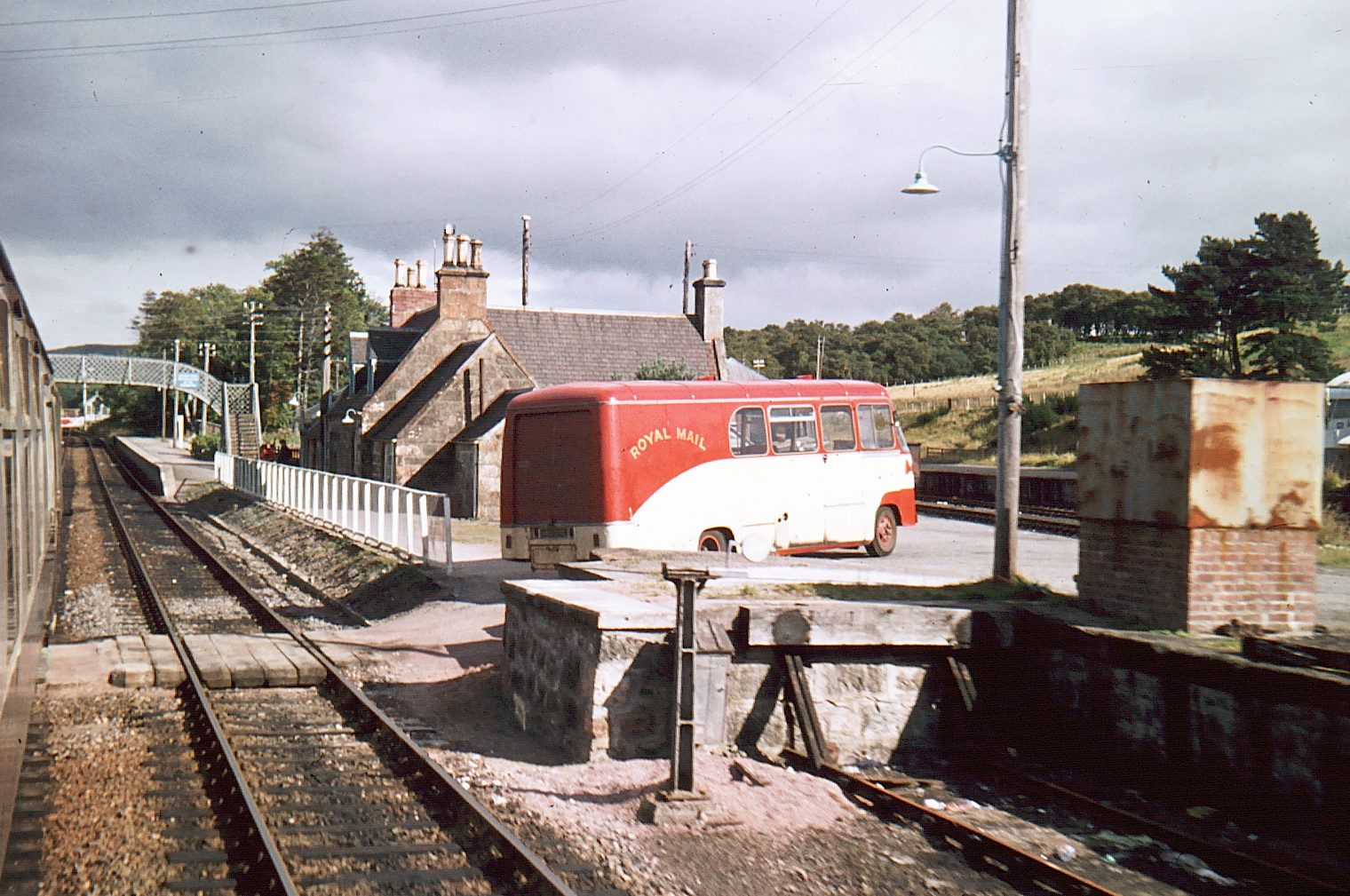
Lairg station In September 1973, With a postbus waiting.

The station opened on 13 April 1868, as part of the Sutherland Railway, later becoming part of the Highland Railway and later the London, Midland and Scottish Railway.

Until April 2009 the station provided an interchange point for postbus services to the remote communities of Durness, Kinlochbervie and Tongue, Highland. Following considerable local opposition to the cancellation of the services they were more recently replaced by temporary services operated, under contract from the Highland Council, by Stagecoach plc.

== Facilities ==
Both platforms have waiting areas and benches, whilst there are also bike racks and a help point adjacent to platform 2. Platform 2 has step-free access from the car park, whilst platform 1 can only be accessed from the footbridge. As there are no facilities to purchase tickets, passengers must buy one in advance, or from the guard on the train.

== Passenger volume ==
Passenger Volume at Lairg
	2004–05	2005–06	2006–07	2007–08	2008–09	2009–10	2010–11	2011–12	2012–13	2013–14	2014–15	2015–16	2016–17	2017–18	2018–19	2019–20	2020–21	2021–22	2022–23	2023–24	2024–25
Entries and exits	4,096	4,126	3,724	4,790	5,280	5,542	6,098	6,330	6,176	7,440	7,514	6,592	5,576	5,426	6,016	6,264	742	2,960	3,348	4,180	3,978

The statistics cover twelve-month periods that start in April.

== Services ==
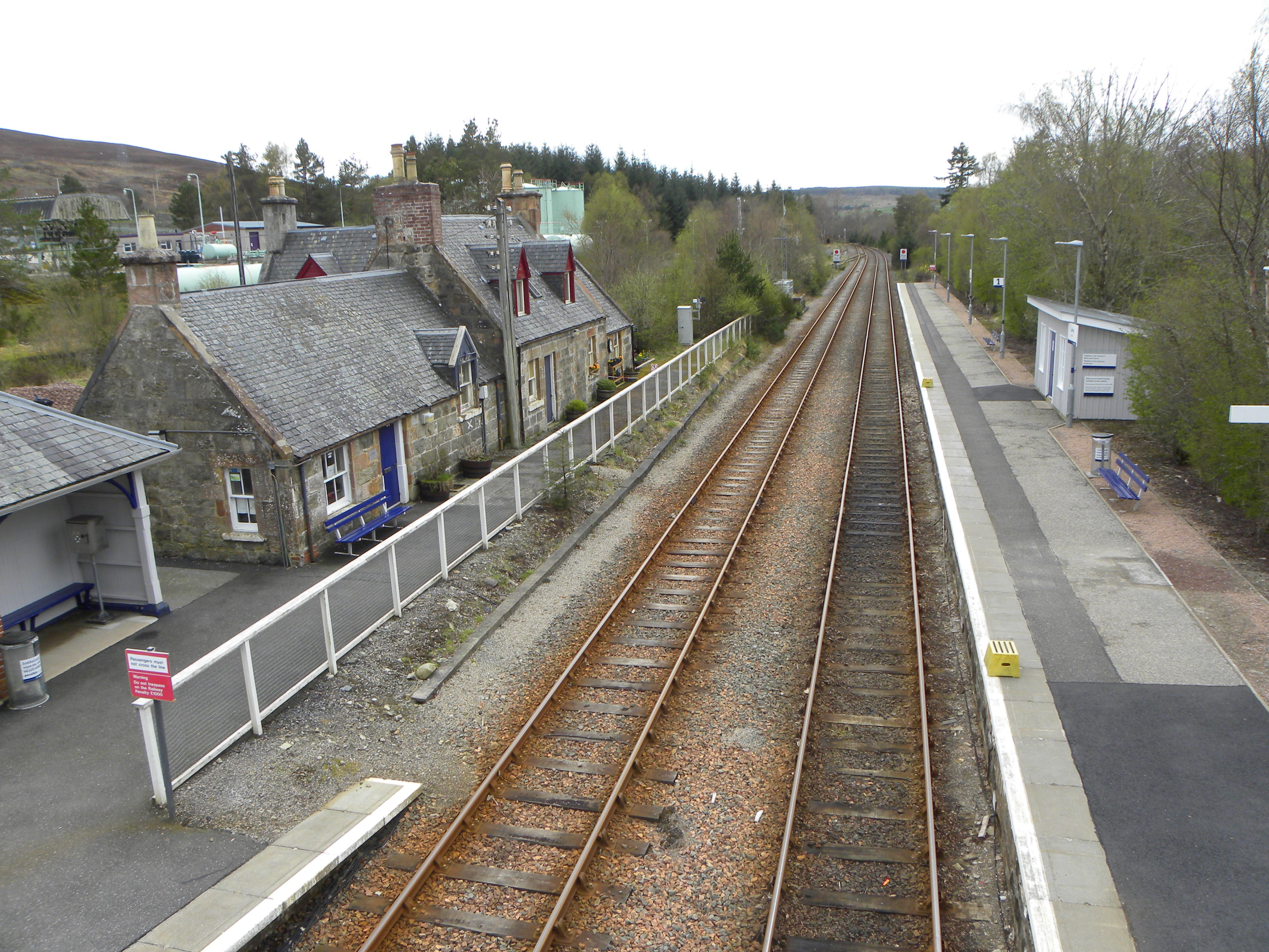
Looking south from Lairg

Four Inverness to Wick via Thurso trains call here each way on weekdays and Saturdays (along with a fifth Inverness departure southbound in the early morning) and a single departure each way on Sundays.

Preceding station	National Rail	Following station
Invershin or Ardgay	ScotRail; Far North Line	Rogart or Terminates here

== Bibliography ==
- Quick, Michael (2022). Railway Passenger Stations in Great Britain: A Chronology (PDF) (5th ed.). London: Railway and Canal Historical Society.
