= Achridigill Loch =

Scottish lake

- Achridig Loch
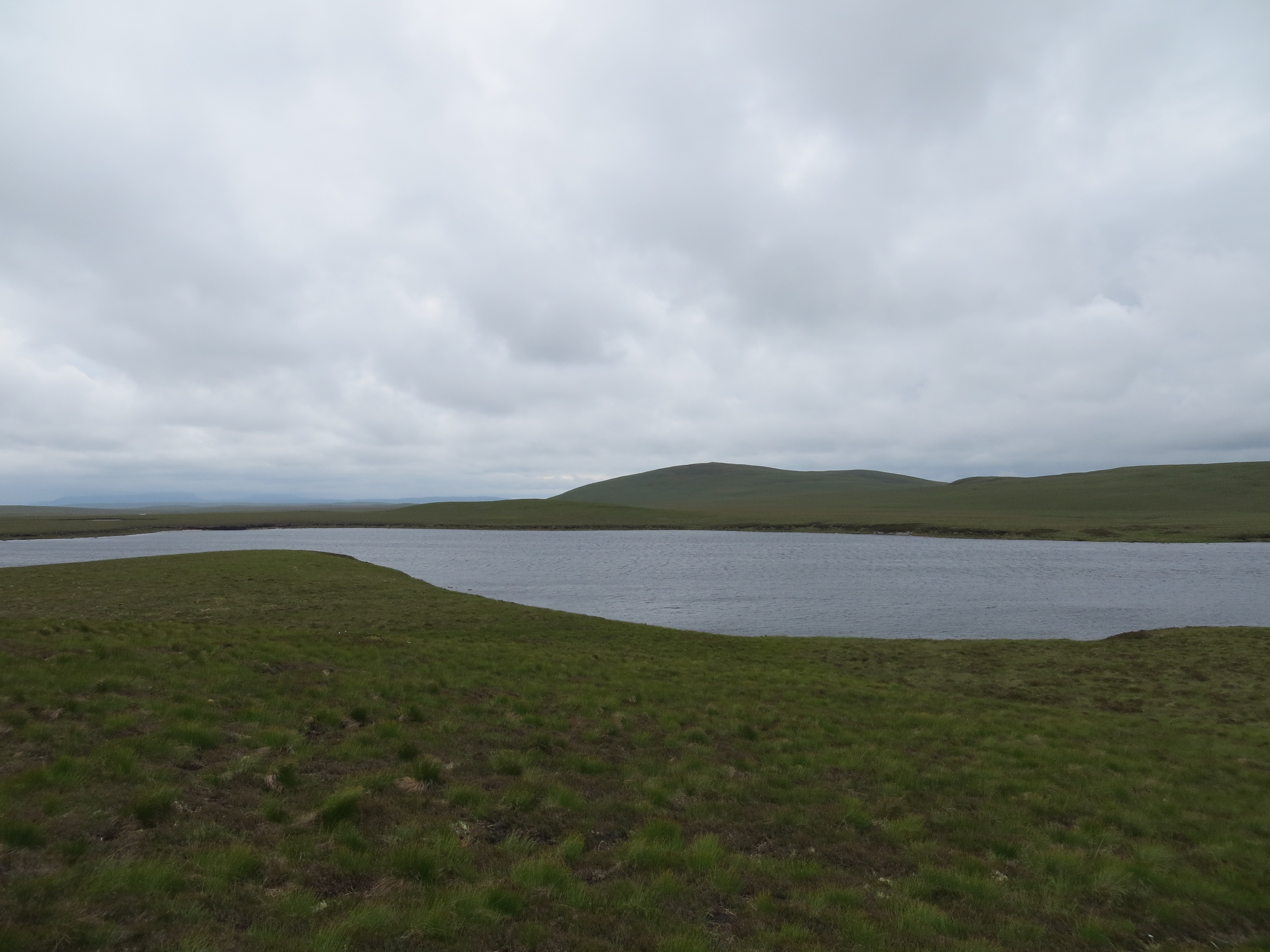
- Achridigill Loch from the north

- Location within Sutherland
- Location: Scottish Highlands
- Coordinates: 58°31′27″N 3°57′46″W
- Primary outflows: Allt a' Ghlasraich
- Basin countries: Scotland, United Kingdom
- Max. length: 639 m (2,096 ft)
- Max. width: 592 m (1,942 ft)
- Surface elevation: 150 m (490 ft)

Achridigill Loch, sometimes listed as Achridig Loch, is a remote lochan (small loch) in Scotland's Flow Country, roughly 2.5 miles southeast of Strathy, a crofting settlement on Scotland's north coast.

The lochan's name likely derives from the same Scottish Gaelic root as the village of Achriesgill, i.e. Achadh Rìdhisgil, meaning "Field of Rìdhisgil".

Achridigill Loch sits within a vast peat bog.

The lochan is a popular spot for brown trout fishing, with a boat available to members of Forsinard Flyfishers' Club. The loch's water level used to be several feet higher but has since retreated, meaning its east end is no longer accessible for boats. A rough private track leads to the loch, accessible for vehicles with four-wheel drive.
