= Altnabreac =

Tiny, remote settlement in Caithness, Scotland

Coordinates: 58.38°N 3.70°W

Altnabreac: Scottish Gaelic: Allt nam Breac
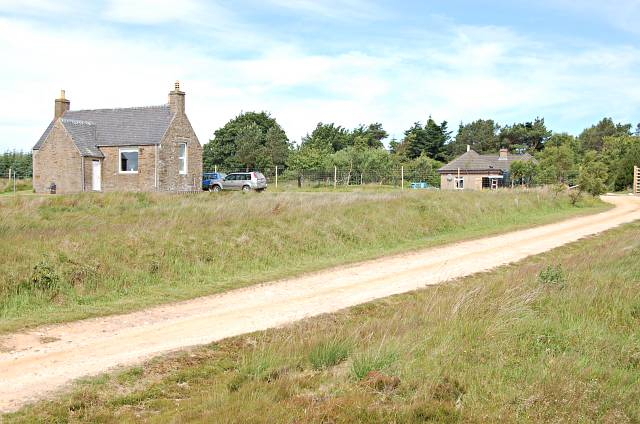
- The old schoolhouse (left) and station (right)

- Location within the Caithness area
- OS grid reference: ND003456
  - Edinburgh: 169 mi (272 km)
  - London: 495 mi (797 km)
- Council area: Highland
- Lieutenancy area: Caithness
- Country: Scotland
- Sovereign state: United Kingdom
- Post town: HALKIRK
- Postcode district: KW12
- Police: Scotland
- Fire: Scottish
- Ambulance: Scottish
- UK Parliament: Caithness, Sutherland and Easter Ross
- Scottish Parliament: Caithness, Sutherland and Ross

Altnabreac (/ˌæltnəˈbrɛk/ ALT-nə-BREK, from Scottish Gaelic Allt nam Breac) is a tiny settlement within the county of Caithness, in the north of Scotland, and now within the Highland council area. The name means "trout stream".

It is located on Altnabreac Moss by the Sleach Water in the Flow Country, 9 miles (14 kilometres) east of Forsinard and 23 mi (37 km) west of Wick. The settlement, notable for its remoteness, consists of Altnabreac railway station and the former Altnabreac School, constructed after the opening of the station. The school was closed in 1986 and converted into a private residence. The former gamekeeper's house sits adjacent to the school and station. There is a natural spring about 200 metres (650 ft) from the school.

The reason for the construction of the station is unknown, but may have been for railway operational reasons. At the time of the station's construction, it served only open countryside.

Lochdhu Lodge, approximately 1 1/2 miles (2.5 kilometres) south, was built in 1895. During the 1980s peat banks were worked to provide fuel for the residents who regularly used to be cut off from the nearest town of Thurso during the winter. It can only be approached by train by special request to stop at the unstaffed station, or along unsurfaced Forestry Commission roads from the nearest village, Westerdale, about 12 mi (19 km) away.

Altnabreac, like Dounreay, was considered as a location for a final repository for the UK's nuclear waste. This idea was not pursued.
