= Ca na Catanach =

Historic road and footpath through the Scottish Highlands

Coordinates: 58°28′10″N 3°36′54″W

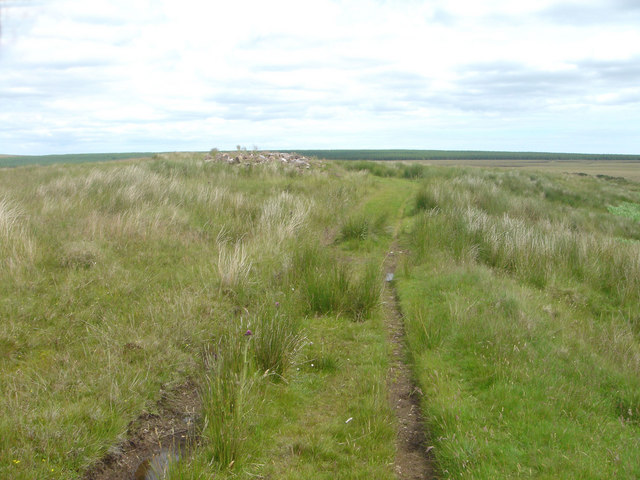
- The ruined house of Cnoc-glas lies next to the Ca na Catanach
- Length: 22 miles (35 km)
- Location: Scotland
- Trailheads: Dorrery Lodge; Achentoul
- Use: Hiking

Ca na Catanach (translation: "Sutherland Men's Path") is a road and footpath between Sutherland and Caithness through the moorland in the northeastern Scottish Highlands. Noted as a post-medieval drovers' road in the Highland Historic Environment Record, it is also a 22-mile (35 km) Heritage Path. Its start point is at Dorrery Lodge and it ends just north of Achentoul. The nine-mile (14 km) section from Thurso to Kinbrace is a rough walking path. A 19th-century estate road overlies Ca na Catanach. In the 1870s Ordnance Survey recorded that point the drove road crosses the historic county border is atop of an eminence known as Cnoc nan Goile, and the name Ca-na-Catanach only applies to the section between Dorrery and Cnoc nan Goile.
