= Dorrery =

Coordinates: 58.473808°N 3.59023°W

- Location within the Caithness area
- OS grid reference: ND073550
- Council area: Highland
- Country: Scotland
- Sovereign state: United Kingdom
- Post town: Scotscalder
- Postcode district: KW12 6
- Police: Scotland
- Fire: Scottish
- Ambulance: Scottish

Dorrery is a small hamlet lying to the east of Ben Dorrery in the district of Halkirk in Caithness, Scottish Highlands and is in the Scottish council area of Highland.

Ca na Catanach is a medieval road that stretches between Dorrery Lodge and Achentoul.
