= Forsinard =

Coordinates: 58.36°N 3.90°W

Forsinard: Scottish Gaelic: Forsan Àird
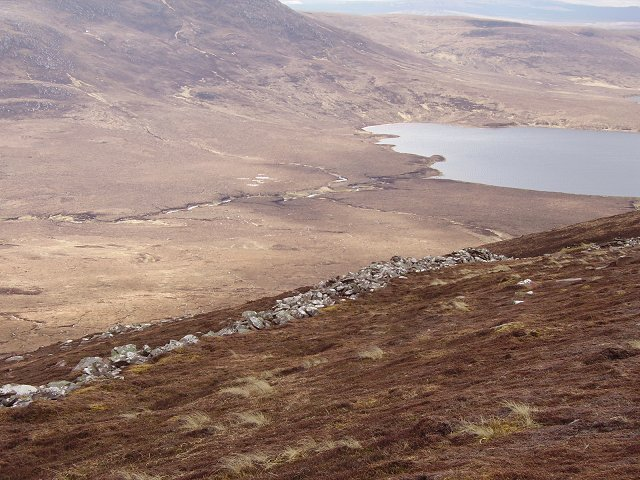
- Walls on Ben Griam Beg from a clearance village

- Location within the Sutherland area
- OS grid reference: NC891430
- Council area: Highland
- Lieutenancy area: Sutherland
- Country: Scotland
- Sovereign state: United Kingdom
- Post town: FORSINARD
- Postcode district: KW13
- Dialling code: 01641
- Police: Scotland
- Fire: Scottish
- Ambulance: Scottish
- UK Parliament: Caithness, Sutherland and Easter Ross
- Scottish Parliament: Caithness, Sutherland and Ross

Forsinard (/ˌfɔːrsɪnˈɑːrd/ FOR-sin-ARD) is a hamlet in the county of Sutherland in the Highland area of Scotland. It is located on the A897 road in Strath Halladale. It is served by a railway station on the Far North Line. The local hotel closed several years ago, but there is now a B&B just across the level crossing.

Forsinard is situated in the Flow Country, a UNESCO World Heritage Site area of peat bog which straddles the borders of Caithness and Sutherland. The 13,000-hectare (33,000-acre) Forsinard estate was purchased in 1977 by Basil Baird. The Royal Society for the Protection of Birds (RSPB) runs a 154 km^{2} (38,000-acre) nature reserve and a visitor centre at Forsinard. The Forsinard Flows national nature reserve attracts a large range of birds and wildlife.

== Rail transport ==
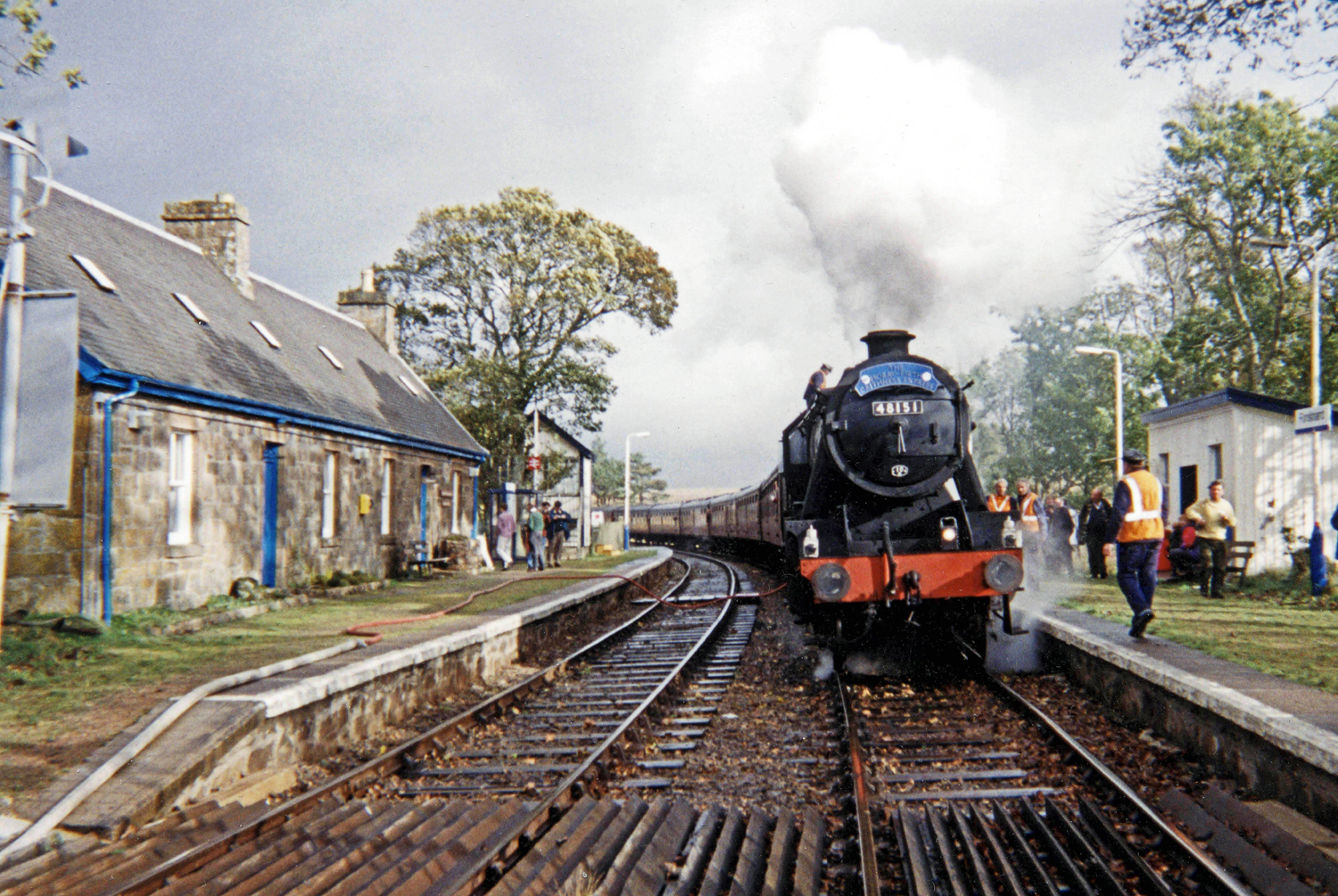
Forsinard railway station in 1998, with the RSPB visitor centre at left and a southbound steam-hauled excursion taking water.

Forsinard Railway Station lies on the picturesque Far North Line, located north of Kinbrace and south of Altnabreac.

It was opened by the Highland Railway on 28 July 1874. From 1 January 1923 it was owned by the London Midland and Scottish Railway. The station is currently managed by ScotRail. The original two-storey station building, which is located on the northbound platform, is used as the RSPB visitor centre.
