= George Rosie =

British journalist and author

George Rosie is a British journalist and author whose work includes plays, a historical fiction novel, documentaries and news articles.

== Life and career ==
He was born in Edinburgh in 1941.

He has worked as a journalist for the Sunday Times, The Herald, The Guardian, The Independent, Radio Times and The Scotsman. He wrote a series of features on subsidies in Scotland under the titles 'Scotching the Myth'.

In 1988, he conducted an investigation with Geoffrey Lean at the Observer on the tax break scheme of large landowners in the Flow Country.

In 1998 he produced a documentary 'After Lockerbie' which won the BAFTA Robert Flaherty Documentary Award in 1999.

In 2001, he released an historical novel on the subject of Victor Frankenstein.

== Published Works ==
- Rosie, George (1970). The British in Vietnam: How the twenty-five year war began. London: Panther. ISBN 978-0586033937.
- Rosie, George (1987). The directory of international terrorism. New York: Paragon House. ISBN 978-0-913729-29-8.
- Rosie, George (2001). Death's enemy: the pilgrimage of Victor Frankenstein. London: Heinemann. ISBN 978-0-434-00827-8.
- Rosie, George (2004). Curious Scotland: tales from a hidden history. London: Granta Books. ISBN 978-1-86207-533-7.
- Rosie, George (2012). The Flight of the Titan: The Story of the R34. Edinburgh: Birlinn. ISBN 978-0-85790-561-1.
