= Caithness and Sutherland Peatlands =

Peatland in northern Scotland

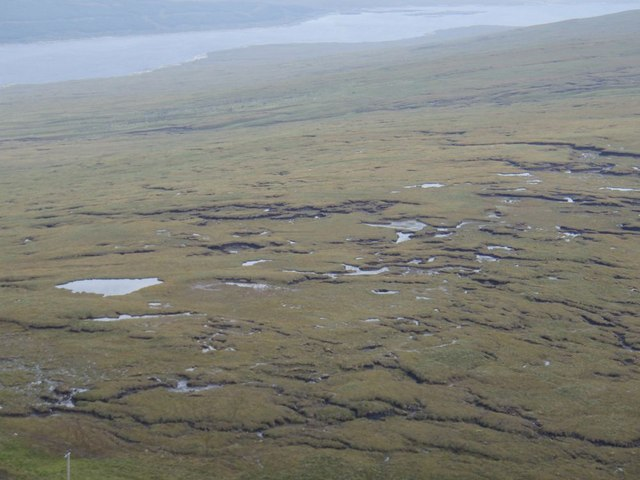
- A view of peatlands to the west of Loch Shin.

- Location within Highland
- Location: Highland, Scotland
- Coordinates: 58.356824°N 3.897081°W
- Area: 1,453 km^{2} (561 sq mi)
- Established: 1999
- Governing body: NatureScot

UNESCO World Heritage Site
- Part of: The Flow Country
- Criteria: Natural: ix
- Reference: 1722
- Inscription: 2024 (46th Session)

The Caithness and Sutherland Peatlands is a large area of blanket bog and peatland, covering a number of disconnected regions across the historic counties of Caithness and Sutherland in the far north of Scotland, across an area known as the Flow Country. With a total area of 143,503 hectares, it is one of the largest recognised conservation sites in the UK, and is the largest Ramsar Site in Scotland.

The area includes a wide variety of vegetation, and supports a diverse range of breeding waterfowl, including internationally important populations of greylag goose and dunlin, and nationally important populations of ten other waterfowl species. It is also important for several rare and scarce species of moss.

Caithness and Sutherland Peatlands has been recognised as a wetland of international importance under the Ramsar Convention, and has been designated a Site of Special Scientific Interest, a Special Protection Area and a Special Area of Conservation. 154 km^{2} of the area is also designated as the Forsinard Flows national nature reserve.
