= Forsinard Flows National Nature Reserve =

National nature reserve in northern Scotland

- IUCN category II (national park)
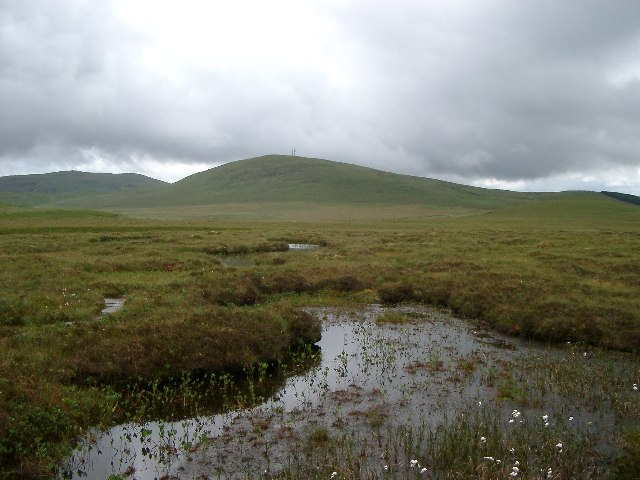
- Small lochans on the accessible area of the Forsinard reserve

- Location within Highland
- Location: Highland, Scotland
- Coordinates: 58.356824°N 3.897081°W
- Area: 153.8 km^{2} (59.4 sq mi)
- Designation: NatureScot
- Established: 2007
- Owner: Royal Society for the Protection of Birds (RSPB)
- Website: Forsinard Flows National Nature Reserve

UNESCO World Heritage Site
- Part of: The Flow Country
- Criteria: Natural: ix
- Reference: 1722
- Inscription: 2024 (46th Session)

Forsinard Flows is a national nature reserve (NNR) covering much of the area surrounding Forsinard in the Highland council area of Scotland. It lies at the heart of the Flow Country, a large, rolling expanse of peatland and wetland area of Caithness and Sutherland that makes up almost 5% of the world's blanket bog. The reserve is managed by the Royal Society for the Protection of Birds (RSPB), and is designated a Category II protected area by the International Union for Conservation of Nature. Much of the NNR overlaps with the designated area of the Caithness and Sutherland Peatlands Special Protection Area and Special Area of Conservation.

== Habitat ==
The Flow Country is Europe's largest expanse of blanket bog, a unique type of habitat for many species. Blanket bogs form in cool, wet areas with acidic soils, as sphagnum mosses does not fully decompose under such conditions. Over thousands of years the partially decomposed remains of mosses and other bog plants build up, forming a layer of peat that can be up to 10 m deep. As well as providing a home for many species of plants and birds, blanket bogs play an important role in regulating carbon dioxide levels in the atmosphere, acting as a carbon sink, and helping to prevent climate change. Peatlands hold nearly 30% of all terrestrial carbon despite covering just 3% of the world's land.

In the years following the Second World War the UK government encouraged the growth of forestry plantations on peatland via grants and tax concessions. During the 1970s and 1980s large areas of the Flow Country were drained and planted with non-native conifers despite having been treeless for thousands of years. These actions dried out the peat, changing the habitat and destroying its value for birds and other wildlife, and since the mid-1980s it has no longer been permitted to establish new woodland on peat that is over 50 cm deep.

From the mid-1990s the RSPB began to purchase large areas at the centre of the Flow Country, and began one of the largest peatland restoration projects ever undertaken in the UK. The area owned by the RSPB site now forms the NNR, which was designated in 2007. The RSPB undertook work to remove the forestry and block up drainage ditches to allow the original water levels to return. The work began in 1998, and by 2015 the first site to be worked on was showing significant recovery. Although the ridge and furrow land pattern of the plantation remained, the site was found to be returning to a healthy blanket bog. The forestry on this site was planted more recently than some other sites, and so recovery was expected to be faster, as some of the original bog vegetation remained. On more mature plantation sites, action has been undertaken to restore the original flat topography by crushing timber into the furrows and removing the ridges by crushing of trees stumps. More recently less intensive restoration methods have also been trialled, in which trees are completely removed from site instead of being left to decompose.

== Flora and fauna ==
The peatlands of the Flow Country are of particular importance for red-throated and black-throated divers and common scoter. These species usually inhabit peatland surrounding pools and lochs in the centre of the reserve, and so are less commonly sighted. Birds that can more easily be seen by visitors to Forsinard Flows include golden plovers, dunlins, greenshank, hen harriers, skylarks and meadow pipits. The area is also noted for carnivorous plants such as sundew and butterwort, as well as aquatic invertebrates such as dragonflies.

== Visitors ==
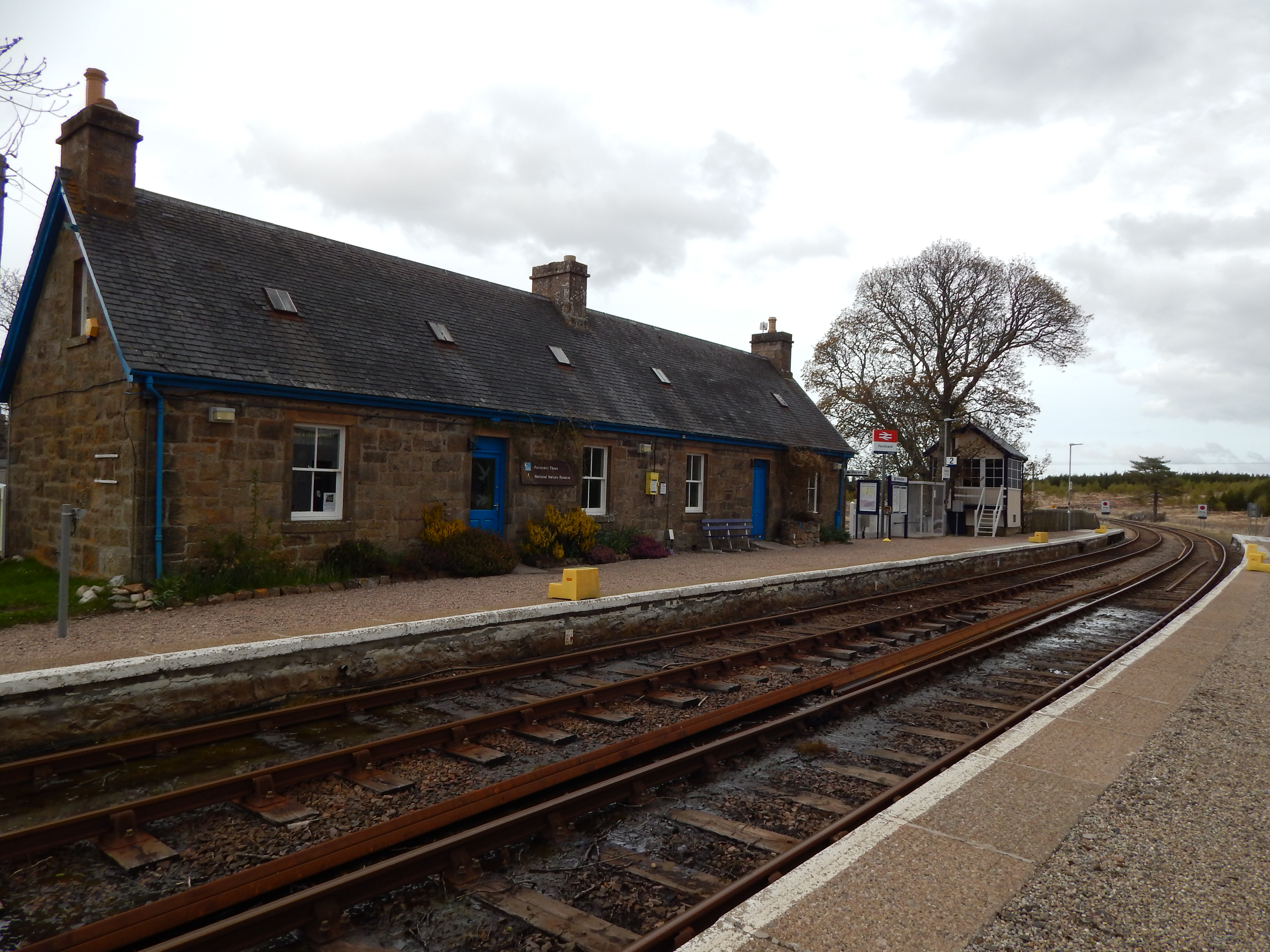
RSPB visitor centre at Forsinard railway station.

The RSPB visitor centre is located in the old station building at Forsinard railway station. A lookout tower provides views over the flat landscape, and two trails have been constructed to take visitors out into the bogland. The Dubh Lochan Trail is approximately 1.6 km-long, and uses a boardwalk to link the visitor centre to the lookout tower. The 6 km-long Forsinain Trail starts about 7 km north of the visitor centre.

The RSPB also run a field studies centre, including education facilities, laboratory and bunkhouse accommodation for groups visiting for educational purposes or to undertake voluntary conservation work.
