= Kildonan railway station =

Railway station in Highland, Scotland

Kildonan Scottish Gaelic: Cill Donnain
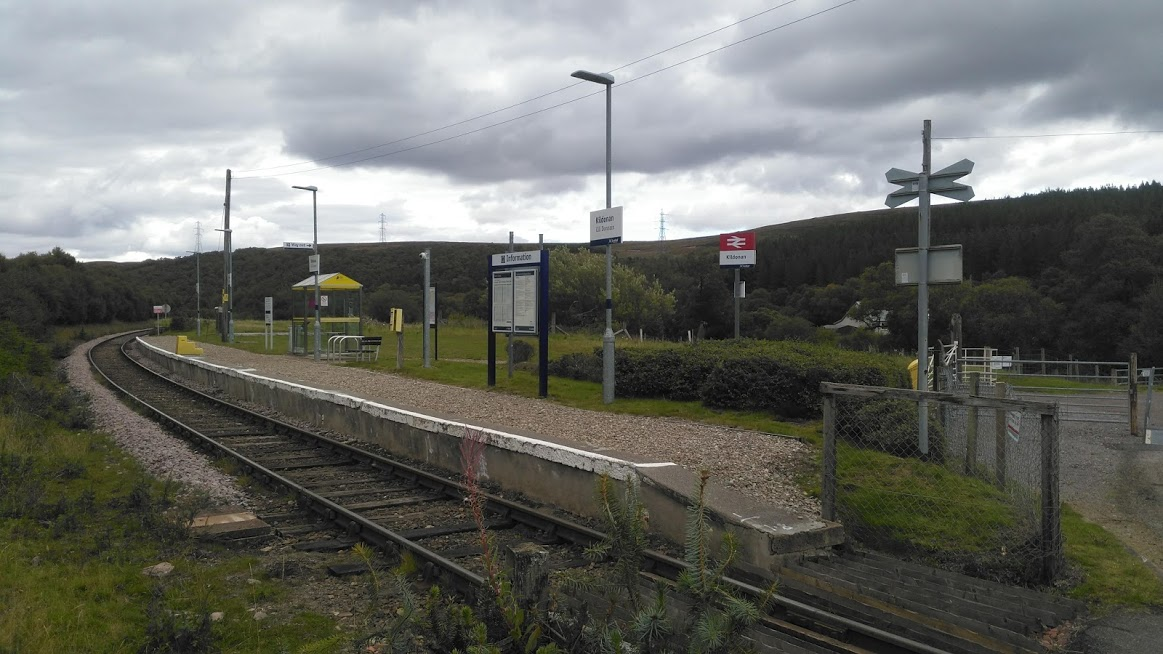
- Kildonan station as it was in September 2018, taken from the level crossing at the southern end of the station.

General information
- Location: Kildonan near Helmsdale, Highland; Scotland
- Coordinates: 58.1708°N 3.8691°W
- Grid reference: NC901217
- Manager: ScotRail
- Platforms: 1

Other information
- Station code: KIL

History
- Original company: Sutherland and Caithness Railway
- Pre-grouping: Highland Railway
- Post-grouping: London, Midland and Scottish Railway; British Railways

Key dates
- 28 July 1874: Opened

Passengers
- 2021/22: ▲140
- 2022/23: ▲148
- 2023/24: ▲240
- 2024/25: ▲312
- 2025/26: ▲320
Location
Notes
- Passenger statistics from the Office of Rail and Road

Kildonan railway station (/kɪlˈdɒnən/ kil-DON-ən) is a railway station near Kildonan Lodge in the Highland council area in the north of Scotland. It is located on the Far North Line, between Helmsdale and Kinbrace, 111 miles 5 chains (178.7 km) from Inverness, and has a single platform which is long enough for a three-coach train. All services are operated by ScotRail, who manage the station.

== History ==
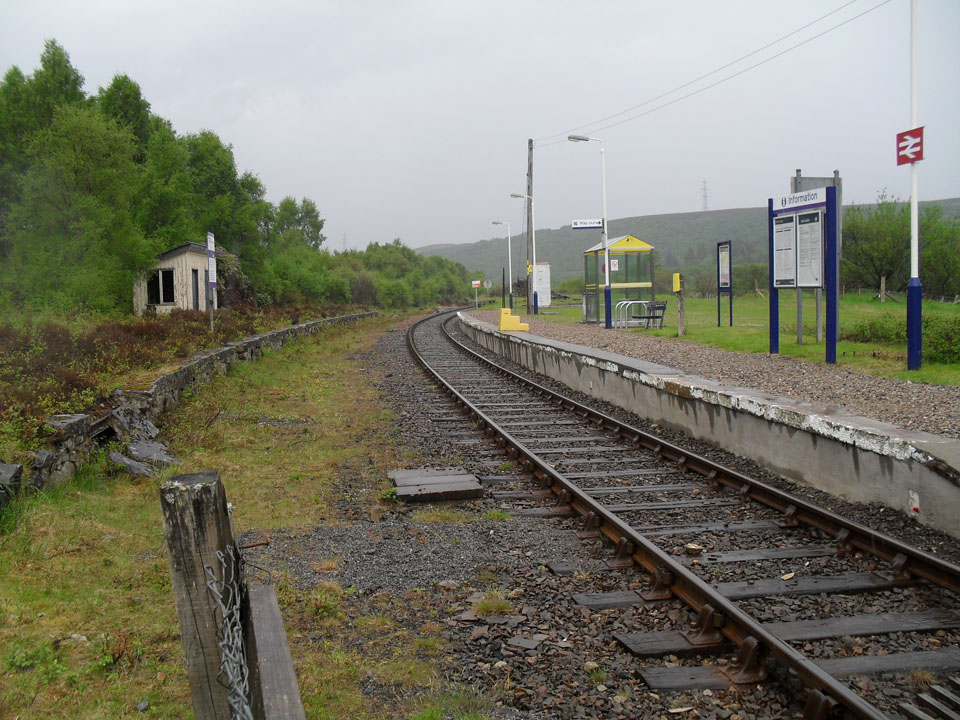
Kildonan station as seen in 2008. The second platform is clearly visible on the left.

The station opened on 28 July 1874. In 1952 the station was awarded a special class award in the British Railway (Scottish Region) Best Kept Stations Competition.

=== Accidents and incidents ===
On 7 February 1884 there was an accident at the station. A special fish train from Wick approached the station when it derailed and ploughed up several hundred yards of track. The fireman, Alexander Campbell of Wick, died and the engine driver, David Mathieson of Wick was badly injured.

=== Proposed closure ===
On 10 June 2018, it was announced that Hitrans had proposed the station for closure, shaving four minutes off journey times on the Inverness to Thurso/Wick route and put application in to Transport Scotland to consider the proposals. However following objections by three local councillors Hitrans withdrew the application.

== Facilities ==
The station has very basic facilities, including a waiting shelter, a bench, a help point and bike racks. As there are no facilities to purchase tickets, passengers must buy one in advance, or from the guard on the train.

On 20 December 2022, Transport Scotland introduced a new "Press & Ride" system at Kildonan, following successful trials of the system at Scotscalder over the previous four months. Previously, passengers wishing to board a train at Kildonan had to flag the train by raising their arm (as is still done at other request stops around the country); this meant that the driver needed to reduce the train's speed before a request stop (to look out for any potential passengers on the platform and be able to stop if necessary), even if the platform was empty. The new system consists of an automatic kiosk (with a button for passengers to press) at the platform; this will alert the driver about any waiting passengers in advance and, if there is no requirement to stop, the train can maintain line speed through the request stops, thus improving reliability on the whole line.

== Passenger volume ==
For the year 2023/24, Kildonan recorded the fewest entries and exits of all railway stations in Scotland (and 10th fewest in the UK overall). It is the least used station on the line.

Passenger Volume at Kildonan
| | 2004–05 | 2005–06 | 2006–07 | 2007–08 | 2008–09 | 2009–10 | 2010–11 | 2011–12 | 2012–13 | 2013–14 | 2014–15 | 2015–16 | 2016–17 | 2017–18 | 2018–19 | 2019–20 | 2020–21 | 2021–22 | 2022–23 | 2023–24 | 2024–25 |
|---|---|---|---|---|---|---|---|---|---|---|---|---|---|---|---|---|---|---|---|---|---|
| Entries and exits | 145 | 165 | 231 | 244 | 174 | 204 | 142 | 240 | 62 | 144 | 96 | 170 | 76 | 206 | 168 | 214 | 16 | 140 | 148 | 240 | 312 |

The statistics cover twelve month periods that start in April.

== Services ==
It is currently served by four trains each day (Mon-Sat) to Inverness and three trains in the opposite direction to Wick (via Thurso), with one train in each direction on a Sunday.

| Preceding station | National Rail | Following station |
|---|---|---|
| Helmsdale | ScotRail; Far North Line | Kinbrace or Forsinard |
| | Historical railways | |
| Salzcraggie Platform; Line open, station closed | Highland Railway; Sutherland and Caithness Railway | Borrobol Platform; Line open, station closed |

== Bibliography ==
- Caton, Peter (2018). Remote Stations. Leicestershire: Matador. ISBN 978-1-78901-408-2.
