= Olgrinmore =

Coordinates: 58.47°N 3.54°W

- Location within the Caithness area
- OS grid reference: ND097553
  - Edinburgh: 174 mi (280 km)
  - London: 500 mi (800 km)
- Council area: Highland
- Lieutenancy area: Caithness
- Country: Scotland
- Sovereign state: United Kingdom
- Post town: Olgrinmore
- Postcode district: KW12
- Dialling code: 01847
- Police: Scotland
- Fire: Scottish
- Ambulance: Scottish
- UK Parliament: Caithness, Sutherland and Easter Ross
- Scottish Parliament: Caithness, Sutherland and Ross

Olgrinmore is a small area in Halkirk, Northern Scotland, south of Thurso and John o' Groats. The B870 runs directly through the centre with Scotscalder to the north and Westerdale to the south. The nearest transport link can be found at Scotscalder railway station which is on the Far North Line. There are no bus services and few footpaths. The nearest car park is in Scotscalder at the railway station.

== Local area ==
There isn't much in the local area . The nearest village is Halkirk and the River Thurso runs nearby. Thurso is a 15-minute drive away and is 8 miles as the crow flies. Loch Calder is 3.5 miles away and can be easily accessed via the B870. There are few paved walkways by the road so it is advised by locals that you use a car or a train to travel around. The B870 is a single lane road that has passing points strategically placed. Nearby shops and other amenities are found in Halkirk.

== Local transport ==
There are no bus services operating in the area meaning that the train is the only reasonable form of Public Transport. Scotscalder railway station is a request stop on the Far North Line. It is managed by ScotRail and has only one platform. The station was opened in 1874 and has seen numbers decrease to a record low in 2018, putting it as one of the least used stations in Britain.

== Other facilities ==
The nearest Post Office can be found in Westerdale which is 3 miles South, via the B870. The nearest car park can be found in Scotscalder. Shops pubs and other business can be found in Halkirk. The nearest school is in Westerdale along with the nearest church. As previously mentioned, the nearest railway station is in Scotscalder.
