= Forsinard railway station =

Railway station in Highland, Scotland

Forsinard Scottish Gaelic: Fors An-Àird
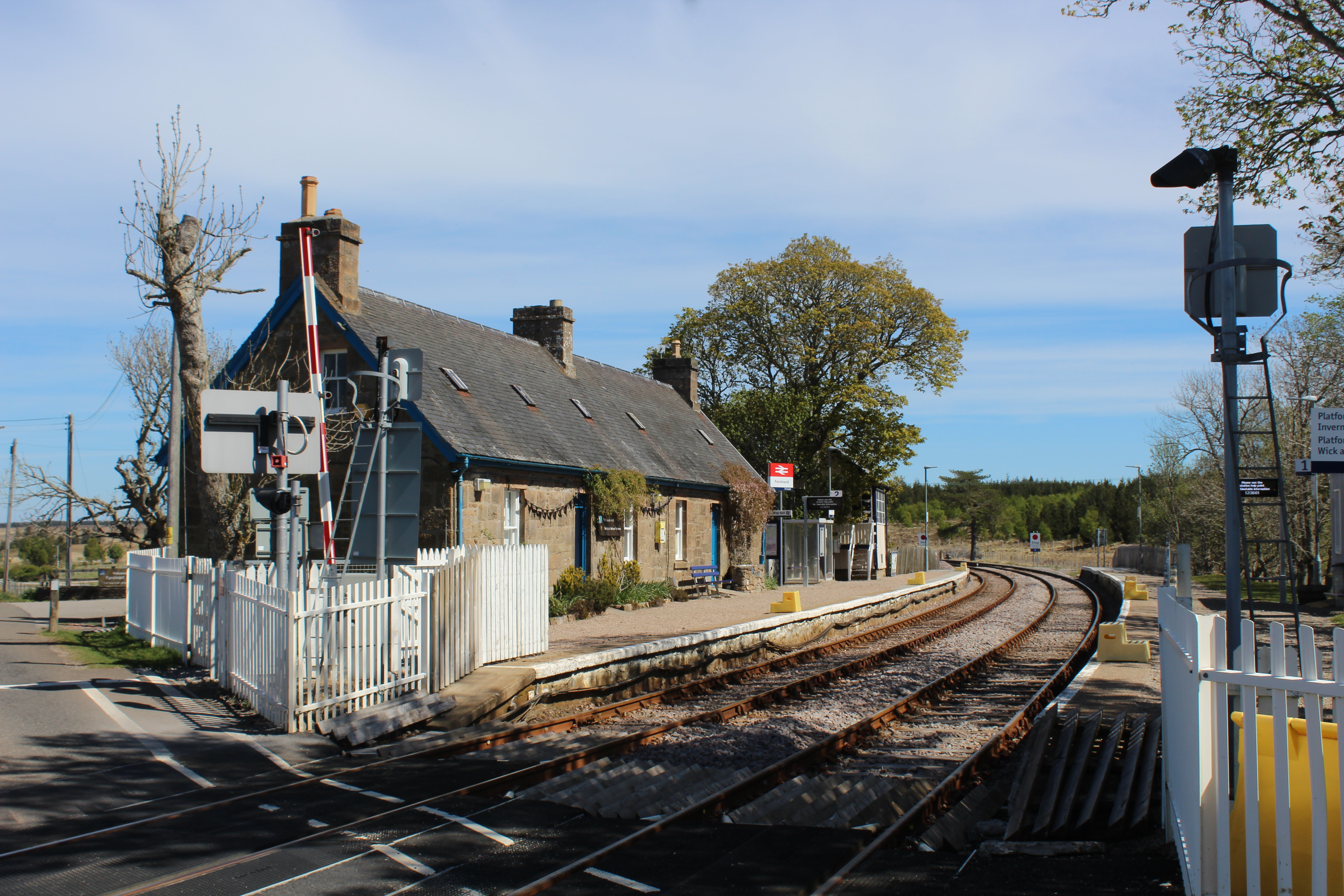
- Looking north towards Altnabreac

General information
- Location: Forsinard, Highland; Scotland
- Coordinates: 58.3568°N 3.8971°W
- Grid reference: NC891425
- Manager: ScotRail
- Platforms: 2

Other information
- Station code: FRS

History
- Original company: Sutherland and Caithness Railway
- Pre-grouping: Highland Railway
- Post-grouping: London, Midland and Scottish Railway

Key dates
- 28 July 1874: Opened

Passengers
- 2021/22: ▲660
- 2022/23: ▲936
- 2023/24: ▲1,376
- 2024/25: ▲1,562
- 2025/26: ▼1,510
Location
Notes
- Passenger statistics from the Office of Rail and Road

Forsinard railway station (/ˌfɔːrsɪnˈɑːrd/) is a railway station serving the village of Forsinard in the Highland council area in the north of Scotland. It is located on the Far North Line, 125 miles 69 chains (202.6 kilometres) from Inverness, between Kinbrace and Altnabreac. The station is managed by ScotRail, who operate the services at the station.

== History ==
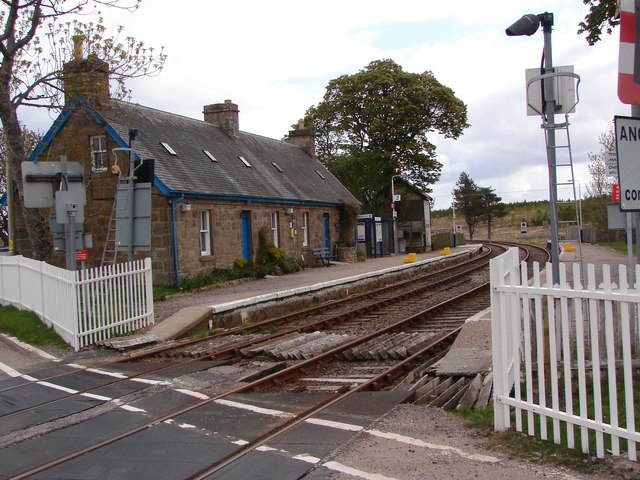
The station buildings in 2008

The Sutherland and Caithness Railway was authorised in 1871, and the single-track line, which connected Helmsdale with Wick and Thurso, opened on 28 July 1874. One of the original stations was that at Forsinard.

From 1 January 1923 the station was owned by the London Midland and Scottish Railway. In September 1925, it was recorded as being 243 miles 34 chains (391.8 km) from Perth, measured via Carrbridge and Inverness station. The station is 125 miles 69 chains (202.6 km) from Inverness, and has a passing loop 21 chains (420 m) long, flanked by two platforms. Platform 1 on the up (southbound) line can accommodate trains having four coaches, but platform 2 on the down (northbound) line can only hold three.

The station building is now used by the Royal Society for the Protection of Birds as the visitors' centre for the Forsinard Flows National Nature Reserve (which protects part of the Flow Country).

== Facilities ==
Both platforms have waiting areas and benches, whilst platform 2 (towards Wick) also has bike racks and a help point. There is also a small car park adjacent to platform 2. As there are no facilities to purchase tickets, passengers must buy one in advance, or from the guard on the train.

== Passenger volume ==
Passenger Volume at Forsinard
	2004–05	2005–06	2006–07	2007–08	2008–09	2009–10	2010–11	2011–12	2012–13	2013–14	2014–15	2015–16	2016–17	2017–18	2018–19	2019–20	2020–21	2021–22	2022–23	2023–24	2024–25
Entries and exits	1,674	1,497	1,098	1,256	1,836	1,496	1,770	1,970	2,088	1,718	1,456	1,516	2,124	2,210	2,530	2,866	160	660	936	1,376	1,562

The statistics cover twelve month periods that start in April.

== Services ==
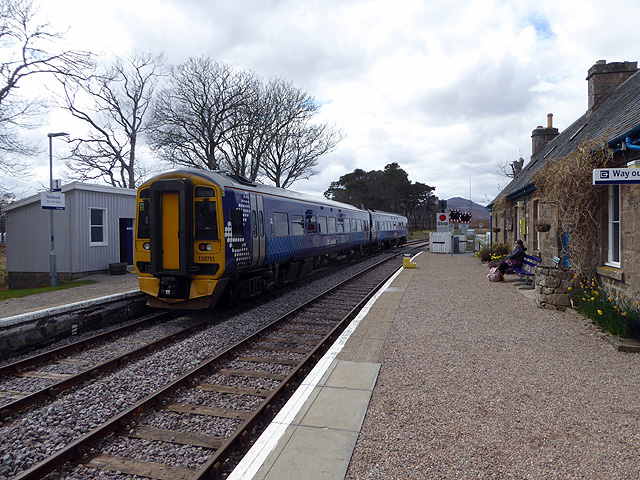
A Class 158 at Forsinard Railway Station.

There are four departures per day in each direction, southbound to Dingwall and Inverness and northbound to Wick via Thurso. One train per day each way calls on Sundays.

Preceding station	National Rail	Following station
Kinbrace or Kildonan	ScotRail; Far North Line	Altnabreac or Georgemas Junction
