= Achentoul =

Coordinates: 58.27651°N 3.92313°W

Achentoul: Scottish Gaelic: Achadh an t-Sabhail
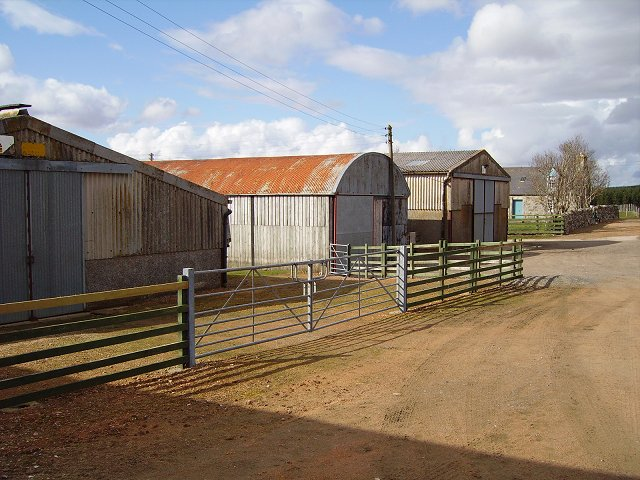

- Location within the Sutherland area
- OS grid reference: NC873335
- Council area: Highland
- Lieutenancy area: Sutherland
- Country: Scotland
- Sovereign state: United Kingdom
- Post town: HELMSDALE
- Postcode district: KW8 6
- Police: Scotland
- Fire: Scottish
- Ambulance: Scottish
- UK Parliament: Caithness, Sutherland and Easter Ross
- Scottish Parliament: Caithness, Sutherland and Ross

Achentoul (Scottish Gaelic: Achadh an t-Sabhail; translation: "field of the barn") is a hamlet in the Kinbrace area of Sutherland, in the Scottish council area of Highland. Consisting of a few farmhouses and barns, Achentoul lies around 1.5 miles (2.4 km) north of Kinbrace along the A897 road and south of Loch An Ruathair. Although the Achentoul Forest is located in this area, the landscape is said to be dominated by moist Atlantic heather moor.

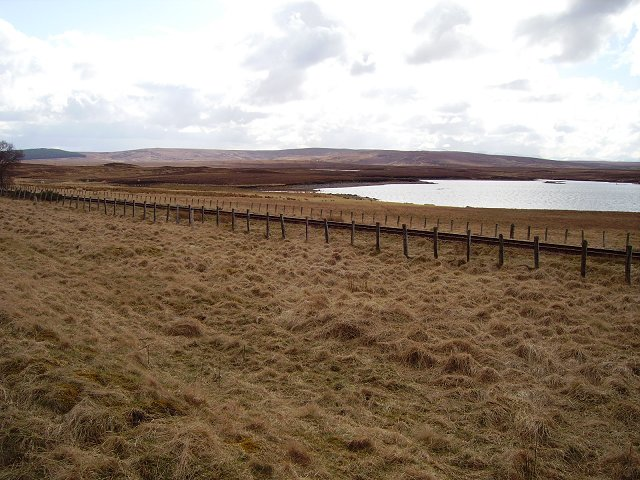
Moor around Loch An Ruathair

== Geography ==
The Achentoul Estate boasts several lochs, including Loch Ascaig, Loch Arachlinie, Loch Badanloch, Loch Ruthair, Loch Drum, Loch Lucy, Loch Cullidh, Loch Dubh, Loch Sletill and Loch Badanloch. Loch fishing is available on a number of the estate's lochs.

== Flora and fauna ==
The rugged and remote Achentoul Forest lies to the north of Achentoul Lodge. A deer forest, it has been a noted sporting estate for deer shooting for centuries. The area is frequented by deer year round, as well as birds of prey.

== Culture ==
Achentoul Lodge was built c. 1900. It is situated southeast of Loch An Ruathair, overlooking the moorland to the north of Kinbrace.

The lodge organizes hind stalking during the winter months (October–February) to kill deer, which are considered pests to the forest. For the sport the farm charges up to £130 for a session if the shooter hires a keeper, although a stalker is only permitted to kill two deer in a session. However, the farm claims that the hind stalking is for woodland conservation purposes primarily, given that the Achentoul estate by 1970 had dedicated 1,000 acres (400 ha) for afforestation and sold 604 acres (244 ha) to the Forestry Commission. Rabbit shooting on the farm is also available.

A notable family on the farm are the Nutting family, who hired the late Donald Mackay to manage the farm in 1958. He worked in Achentoul for a long time with the Henderson brothers; he died in 2010, aged 76.

The Ca na Catanach is a 35 km (22 mi) medieval road and drovers' road with a footpath between Dorrery Lodge and the north end of Achentoul.

Kinbrace Hill (also known as Kinbrace Farm or Achentoul Forest) is noted by the Royal Commission on the Ancient and Historical Monuments of Scotland for a long, chambered cairn.
