= Scotscalder railway station =

Railway station in Highland, Scotland

Scotscalder Scottish Gaelic: Caladal nan Gall
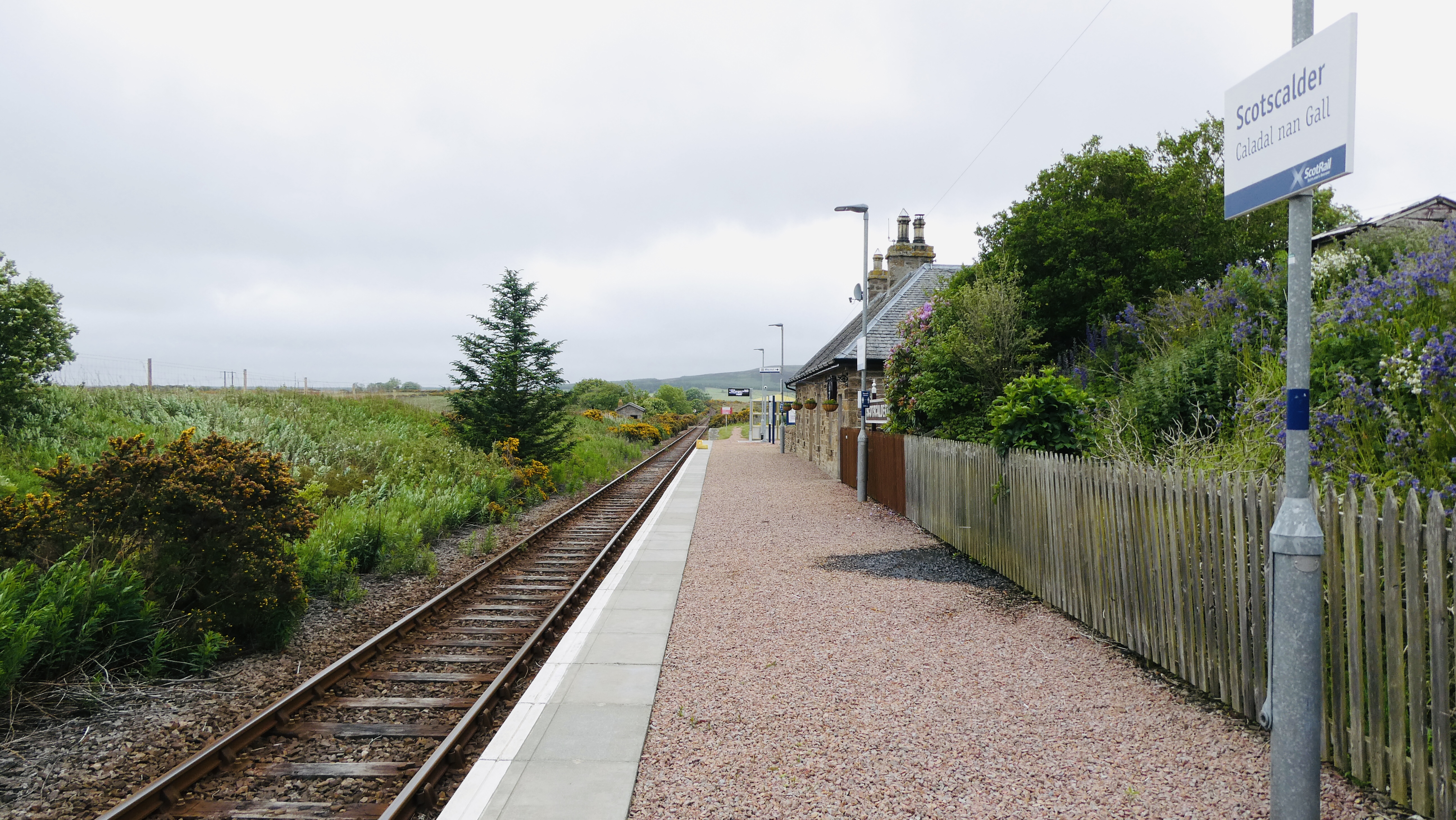
- The platform at Scotscalder, looking southwest

General information
- Location: Scotscalder, Highland; Scotland
- Coordinates: 58.4829°N 3.5521°W
- Grid reference: ND096560
- Manager: ScotRail
- Platforms: 1

Other information
- Station code: SCT

History
- Original company: Sutherland and Caithness Railway
- Pre-grouping: Highland Railway
- Post-grouping: LMS

Key dates
- 28 July 1874: Open

Passengers
- 2021/22: ▲116
- 2022/23: ▲124
- 2023/24: ▲242
- 2024/25: ▼226
- 2025/26: ▲390
Location
Notes
- Passenger statistics from the Office of Rail and Road

Scotscalder railway station is a railway station located in the Highland council area in the far north of Scotland. It serves several rural hamlets in the historic county of Caithness, including Scotscalder, Olgrinmore, Westerdale and Calder. It is accessed from the B870 road, two miles (3 km) south of Scotscalder Hall. The station is situated on the Far North Line, 143 miles 2 chains (230.2 km) down the line from Inverness, between Altnabreac and Georgemas Junction. It has a single platform which is long enough to accommodate a four-carriage train.

The station is managed by ScotRail, who operate all trains serving the station.

== History ==
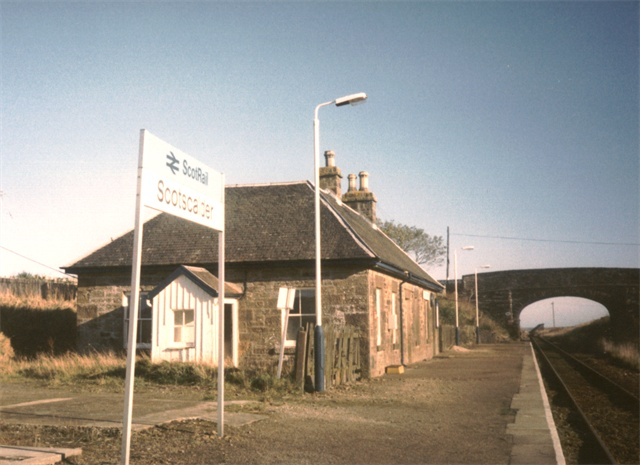
Scotscalder station in 1983

The station was opened by the Sutherland and Caithness Railway on 28 July 1874.

In 1988 the station house was sold by the British Railways Board for conversion to a residential dwelling. Following the conversion, in 1993, the station house was sold again and renovated further, for which the owner won the Ian Allan Railway Heritage Award. The station house was used as a holiday home during this period, but was available to rent for short periods. The station house is now a private residence and is no longer available to rent or open to the public.

== Facilities ==
The station has minimal facilities, including bike racks, a help point and a small waiting shelter. As there are no facilities to purchase tickets, passengers must buy one in advance, or from the guard on the train.

On 15 August 2022, Transport Scotland introduced a new "Press & Ride" system at the station on a trial basis. Previously, passengers wishing to board a train at Scotscalder had to flag the train by raising their arm (as is still done at other request stops around the country); this meant that the driver had to reduce the train's speed before a request stop (to look out for any potential passengers on the platform and be able to stop if necessary), even if the platform was empty. The new system consists of an automatic kiosk (with a button for passengers to press) at the platform; this will alert the driver about any waiting passengers in advance and, if there is no requirement to stop, the train can maintain line speed through the station, thus improving reliability on the whole line. Following the successful trial at Scotscalder, this system was expanded on 20 December 2022 to cover five more request stops on the line, namely Kinbrace, Kildonan, Rogart, Invershin and Culrain; the last two kiosks, at Altnabreac and Dunrobin Castle, are expected to be in operation from spring 2023.

== Passenger volume ==
Owing to its geographical remoteness, limited services and lengthy journey times, Scotscalder's patronage is extremely low: the station has not seen more than 500 passengers in a year since at least the 2002–03 financial year. In 2017–18 the station only saw 182 passengers, making it the 12th least-used railway station in Britain and the least-used on the Far North Line. In 2018–19 the patronage increased to 238, making Scotscalder the second least-used station on the line (behind Kildonan) and the 15th least-used in Britain.

Passenger Volume at Scotscalder
| | 2004–05 | 2005–06 | 2006–07 | 2007–08 | 2008–09 | 2009–10 | 2010–11 | 2011–12 | 2012–13 | 2013–14 | 2014–15 | 2015–16 | 2016–17 | 2017–18 | 2018–19 | 2019–20 | 2020–21 | 2021–22 | 2022–23 | 2023–24 | 2024–25 |
|---|---|---|---|---|---|---|---|---|---|---|---|---|---|---|---|---|---|---|---|---|---|
| Entries and exits | 187 | 212 | 142 | 212 | 256 | 184 | 246 | 214 | 460 | 376 | 388 | 294 | 200 | 182 | 238 | 232 | 18 | 116 | 124 | 242 | 226 |

The statistics cover twelve month periods that start in April.

== Services ==
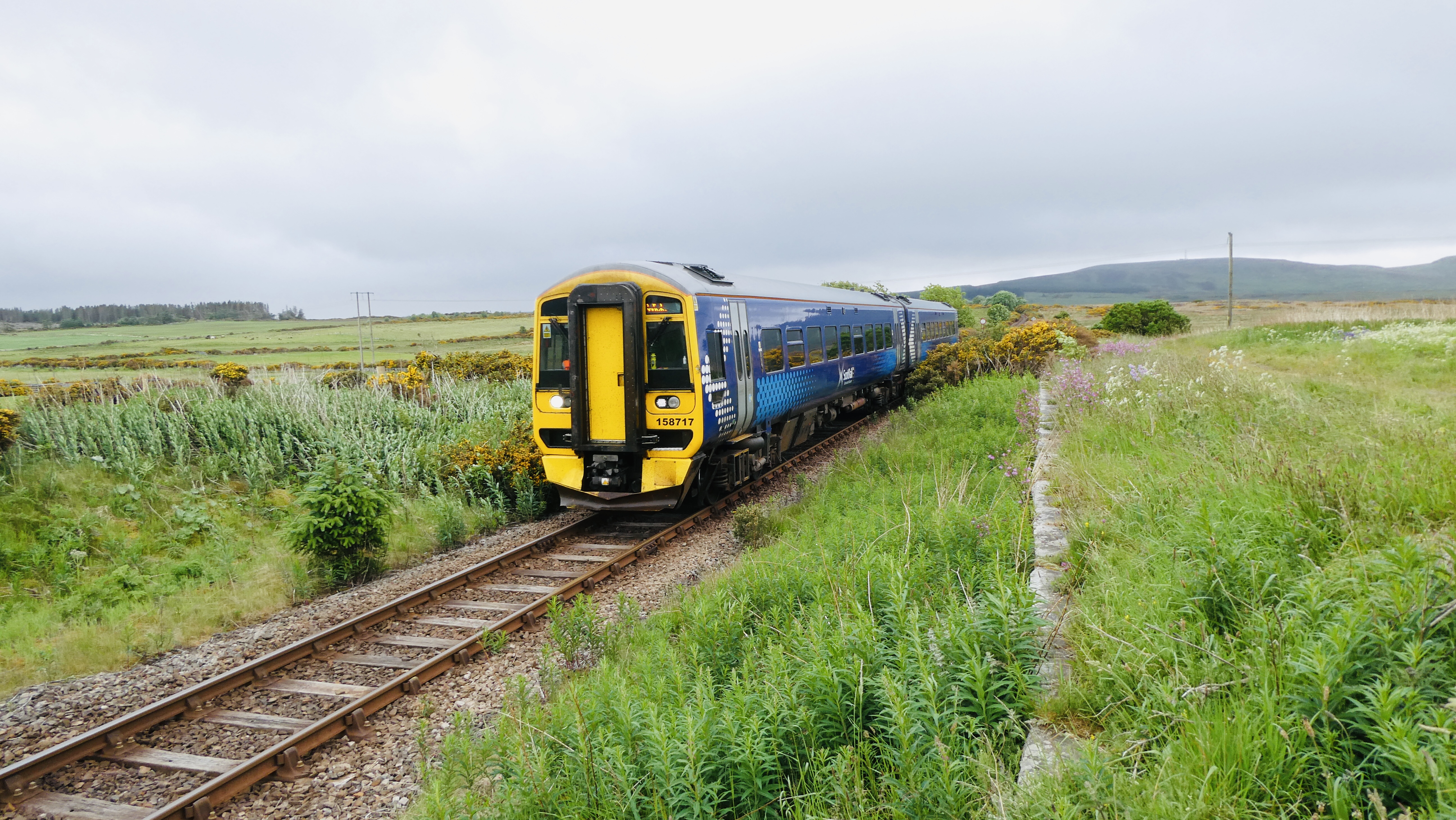
A Class 158 approaching Scotscalder

On weekdays and Saturdays, the service pattern from the station consists of four trains per day northbound to Wick via Thurso and three trains per day southbound to Inverness via Helmsdale, Golspie, Lairg, Tain and Dingwall. (There is a fourth train bound for Inverness but it is not scheduled to call at Scotscalder.) On Sundays there is just one train per day each way.

This station is designated as a request stop. This means that passengers intending to alight must inform the guard in advance, and any passengers wishing to board must press a "request" button located at the kiosk on the platform.

| Preceding station | National Rail | Following station |
|---|---|---|
| Altnabreac | ScotRail; Far North Line | Georgemas Junction |
| | Historical railways | |
| Altnabreac; Line and station open | Highland Railway; Sutherland and Caithness Railway | Halkirk; Line open, station closed |

== Bibliography ==
- Brailsford, Martyn, ed. (December 2017) [1987]. Railway Track Diagrams 1: Scotland & Isle of Man (6th ed.). Frome: Trackmaps. ISBN 978-0-9549866-9-8.
- Butt, R. V. J. (October 1995). The Directory of Railway Stations: details every public and private passenger station, halt, platform and stopping place, past and present (1st ed.). Sparkford: Patrick Stephens Ltd. ISBN 978-1-85260-508-7. OCLC 60251199. OL 11956311M.
- Jowett, Alan (March 1989). Jowett's Railway Atlas of Great Britain and Ireland: From Pre-Grouping to the Present Day (1st ed.). Sparkford: Patrick Stephens Ltd. ISBN 978-1-85260-086-0. OCLC 22311137.
- Jowett, Alan (2000). Jowett's Nationalised Railway Atlas (1st ed.). Penryn, Cornwall: Atlantic Transport Publishers. ISBN 978-0-906899-99-1. OCLC 228266687.
