= Kinbrace railway station =

Railway station in Highland, Scotland

Kinbrace Scottish Gaelic: Ceann a' Bhràiste
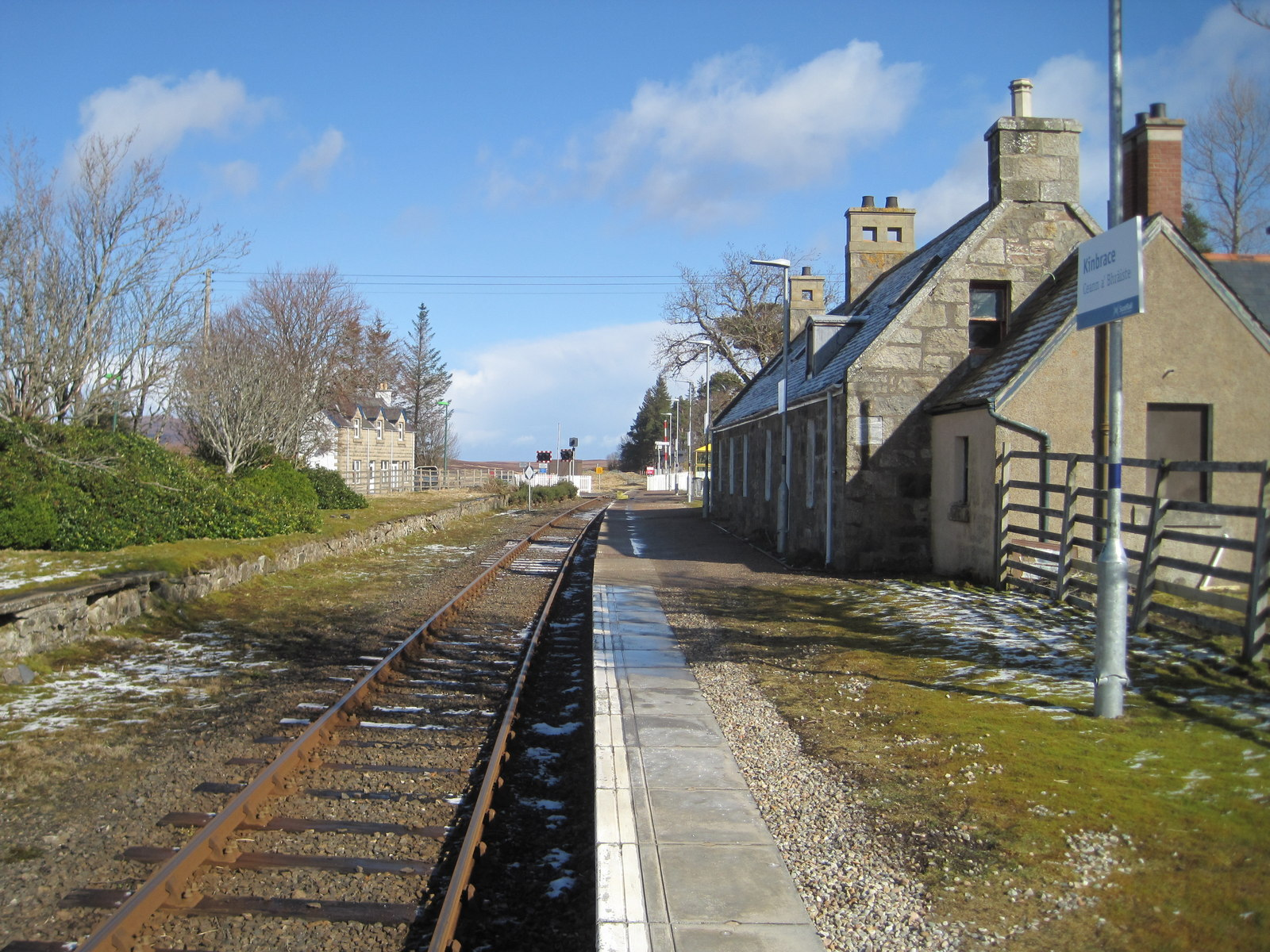

General information
- Location: Kinbrace, Highland; Scotland
- Coordinates: 58.2585°N 3.9412°W
- Grid reference: NC862316
- Manager: ScotRail
- Platforms: 1

Other information
- Station code: KBC

History
- Opened: 28 July 1874
- Original company: Sutherland and Caithness Railway
- Pre-grouping: Highland Railway
- Post-grouping: London, Midland and Scottish Railway

Key dates
- 28 July 1874: Opened

Passengers
- 2021/22: ▲370
- 2022/23: ▲436
- 2023/24: ▲606
- 2024/25: ▼406
- 2025/26: ▲478
Location
Notes
- Passenger statistics from the Office of Rail and Road

Kinbrace railway station is a railway station serving the village of Kinbrace in the Highland council area in the north of Scotland. It is located on the Far North Line, 118 miles 20 chains (190.3 kilometres) from Inverness, between Kildonan and Forsinard. The station is managed by ScotRail, who operates the services at the station.

== History ==
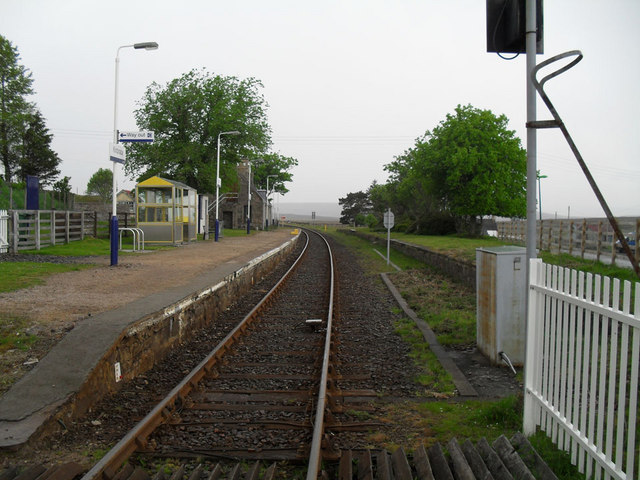
The station in 2010

Helmsdale had been linked to Inverness by rail in 1870. The Sutherland and Caithness Railway was formed in 1871 to carry the railway onward to Thurso and Wick, by a route which took it through Strath Ullie. The line opened on 28 July 1874 and included a station at Kinbrace.

== Facilities ==
The station unusually has two waiting shelters, as well as a help point and bike racks. As there are no facilities to purchase tickets, passengers must buy one in advance, or from the guard on the train.

On 20 December 2022, Transport Scotland introduced a new "Press & Ride" system at Kinbrace, following successful trials of the system at Scotscalder over the previous four months. Previously, passengers wishing to board a train at Kinbrace had to flag the train by raising their arm (as is still done at other request stops around the country); this meant that the driver needed to reduce the train's speed before a request stop (to look out for any potential passengers on the platform and be able to stop if necessary), even if the platform was empty. The new system consists of an automatic kiosk (with a button for passengers to press) at the platform; this will alert the driver about any waiting passengers in advance and, if there is no requirement to stop, the train can maintain line speed through the request stops, thus improving reliability on the whole line.

== Passenger volume ==
The main origin or destination station for journeys to or from Kinbrace station in the 2022/23 period was Inverness, making up 132 of the 436 journeys (37.16%).

Passenger Volume at Kinbrace
	2004–05	2005–06	2006–07	2007–08	2008–09	2009–10	2010–11	2011–12	2012–13	2013–14	2014–15	2015–16	2016–17	2017–18	2018–19	2019–20	2020–21	2021–22	2022–23	2023–24	2024–25
Entries and exits	518	562	537	737	792	410	448	778	1,090	1,092	528	456	464	376	510	456	44	370	436	606	406

The statistics cover twelve month periods that start in April.

== Services ==
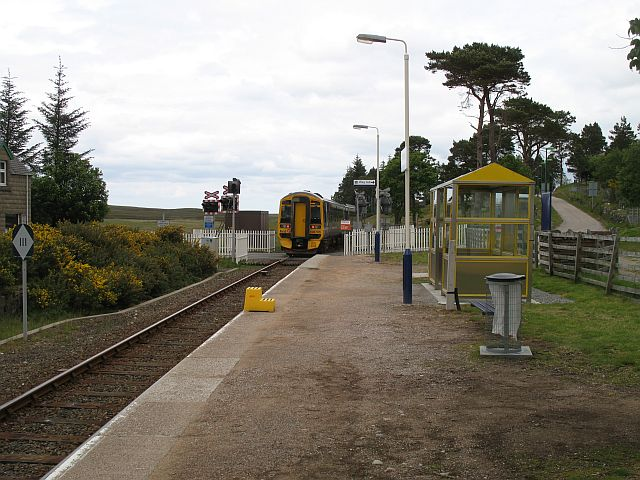
A train departing Kinbrace

In the December 2021 timetable, there are four trains north to Wick via Thurso and three south to Inverness from Wick, on weekdays and Saturdays. There is a fourth Wick to Inverness service, but this does not stop at Kinbrace. There is a single train each way on Sundays.

Preceding station	National Rail	Following station
Kildonan	ScotRail; Far North Line	Forsinard
	Historical railways	
Borrobol Platform; Line open, station closed	Highland Railway; Sutherland and Caithness Railway	Forsinard; Line and station open
