= Kinbrace =

Coordinates: 58.260095°N 3.940845°W

Kinbrace: Scottish Gaelic: Ceann a' Bhràist
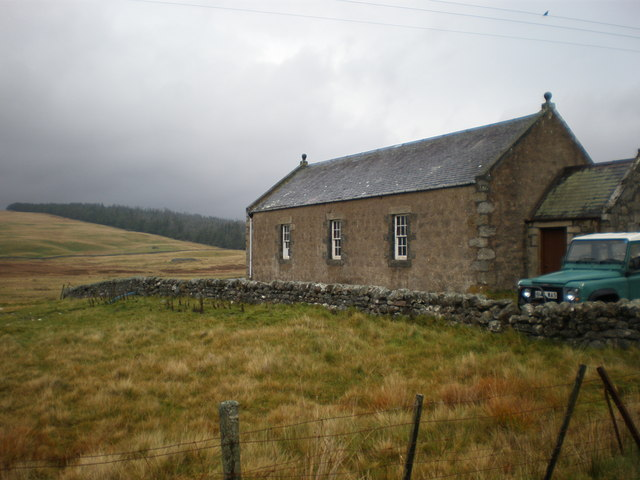
- Kinbrace Church

- Location within the Sutherland area
- OS grid reference: NC862317
  - Edinburgh: 162 mi (261 km)
  - London: 490 mi (789 km)
- Council area: Highland
- Country: Scotland
- Sovereign state: United Kingdom
- Post town: Kinbrace
- Postcode district: KW11
- Police: Scotland
- Fire: Scottish
- Ambulance: Scottish
- UK Parliament: Caithness, Sutherland and Easter Ross
- Scottish Parliament: Caithness, Sutherland and Ross

Kinbrace is a small village in Sutherland in the Highland council area of Scotland. It lies at the junction of the A897 and B871 and is 17 miles (27 km) from Helmsdale by road. The village has a station on the Far North Line (also named Kinbrace). Few people live in the village, with the population standing at 51 in the 2011 Census.

The village is represented in the House of Commons of the United Kingdom constituency of Caithness, Sutherland and Easter Ross, where it is represented by Jamie Stone of the Scottish Liberal Democrats. It is represented in the Scottish Parliament by Maree Todd of the Scottish National Party.

== Climate ==
Like most of the United Kingdom, Kinbrace experiences an oceanic climate (Cfb) with mild summers and cool winters. Nonetheless, it is one of the more frost prone low-lying locations in Scotland, with notable temperatures including a minimum of −21.7 °C (−7.1 °F) during March 2001, and a daytime maximum of −10.5 °C (13.1 °F) during November 1985, when a temperature inversion persisted throughout the day. It is one of the few low-lying locations in Scotland which have recorded frost in each summer month.

Climate data for Kinbrace (103 m or 338 ft asl, averages 1991–2020)
Month	Jan	Feb	Mar	Apr	May	Jun	Jul	Aug	Sep	Oct	Nov	Dec	Year
Record high °C (°F)	12.3 (54.1)	13.4 (56.1)	17.7 (63.9)	23.6 (74.5)	27.1 (80.8)	28.6 (83.5)	29.5 (85.1)	29.1 (84.4)	25.4 (77.7)	20.8 (69.4)	16.1 (61.0)	13.0 (55.4)	29.5 (85.1)
Mean daily maximum °C (°F)	5.8 (42.4)	6.5 (43.7)	8.4 (47.1)	11.2 (52.2)	14.1 (57.4)	16.2 (61.2)	18.2 (64.8)	17.8 (64.0)	15.6 (60.1)	11.9 (53.4)	8.4 (47.1)	5.8 (42.4)	11.7 (53.1)
Daily mean °C (°F)	2.5 (36.5)	2.9 (37.2)	4.4 (39.9)	6.7 (44.1)	9.0 (48.2)	11.7 (53.1)	13.7 (56.7)	13.4 (56.1)	11.4 (52.5)	8.1 (46.6)	5.0 (41.0)	2.4 (36.3)	7.6 (45.7)
Mean daily minimum °C (°F)	−0.8 (30.6)	−0.8 (30.6)	0.5 (32.9)	2.2 (36.0)	4.0 (39.2)	7.3 (45.1)	9.3 (48.7)	9.0 (48.2)	7.1 (44.8)	4.3 (39.7)	1.6 (34.9)	−1.0 (30.2)	3.6 (38.5)
Record low °C (°F)	−20.3 (−4.5)	−24.8 (−12.6)	−21.7 (−7.1)	−10.2 (13.6)	−6.3 (20.7)	−4.0 (24.8)	−1.8 (28.8)	−2.6 (27.3)	−5.1 (22.8)	−9.4 (15.1)	−19.6 (−3.3)	−25.5 (−13.9)	−25.5 (−13.9)
Average precipitation mm (inches)	98.8 (3.89)	84.7 (3.33)	73.0 (2.87)	64.2 (2.53)	59.4 (2.34)	59.7 (2.35)	54.0 (2.13)	70.2 (2.76)	71.5 (2.81)	111.2 (4.38)	102.6 (4.04)	99.5 (3.92)	948.9 (37.36)
Average precipitation days (≥ 1.0 mm)	18.6	16.4	15.8	13.5	12.9	12.6	12.5	13.5	13.9	17.3	18.0	18.0	182.9
Mean monthly sunshine hours	38.8	68.8	106.1	150.9	192.3	146.8	135.2	128.7	114.4	81.9	48.8	27.6	1,240.1
Source 1: Met Office
Source 2: Starlings Roost Weather

== Notable people ==
- Angus Ross died in Kinbrace

== See also ==
- Auchentoul
