= Altnabreac railway station =

Railway station in Highland, Scotland

Altnabreac Scottish Gaelic: Allt nam Breac
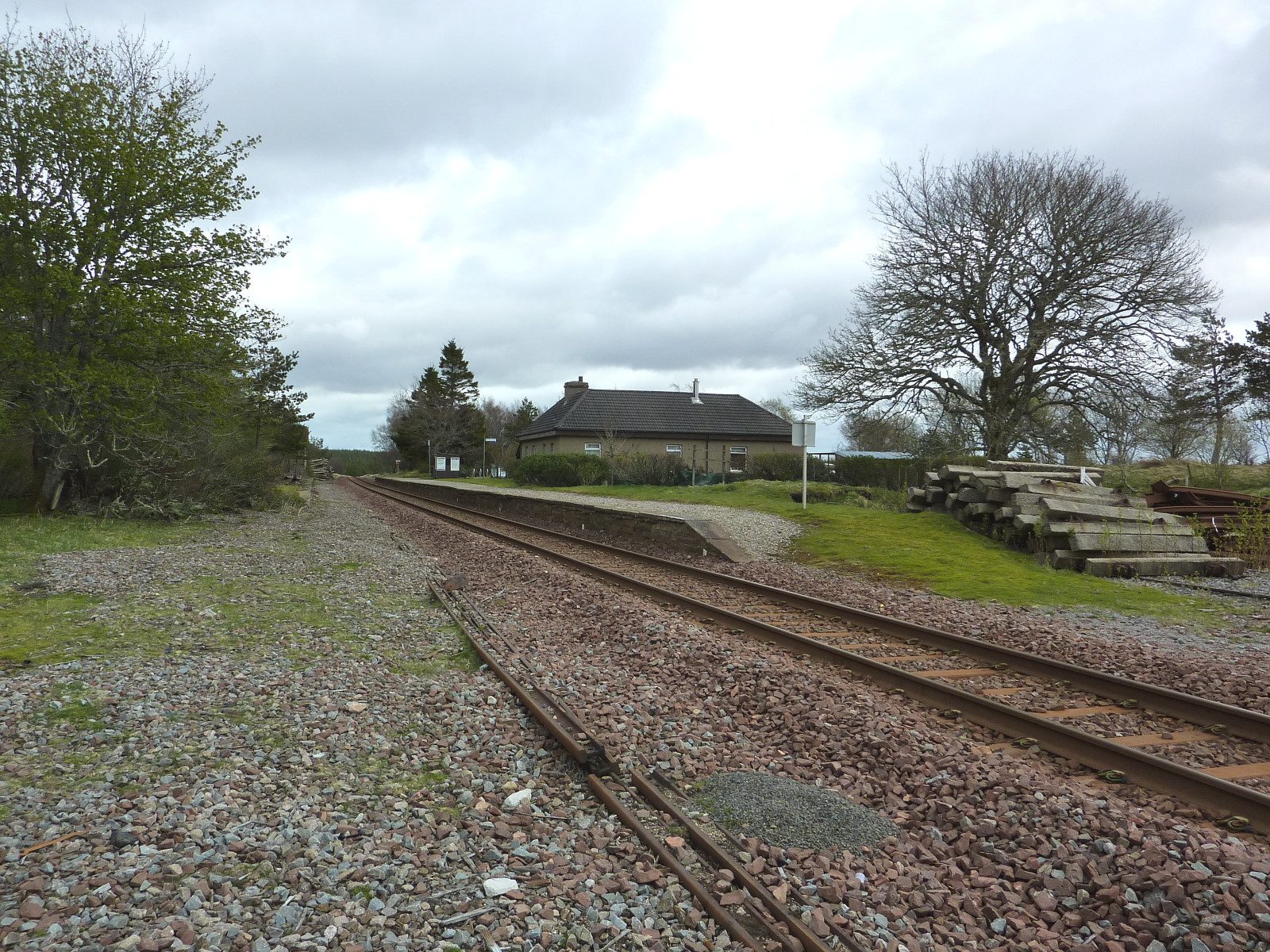
- Altnabreac railway station

General information
- Location: Altnabreac, Highland; Scotland
- Coordinates: 58.3882°N 3.7059°W
- Grid reference: ND003456
- Manager: ScotRail
- Platforms: 1

Other information
- Station code: ABC

History
- Original company: Sutherland and Caithness Railway
- Pre-grouping: Highland Railway
- Post-grouping: LMSR

Key dates
- 28 July 1874: Opened
- 12 November 2023: Temporarily closed
- 6 April 2025: Reopened

Passengers
- 2021/22: ▲230
- 2022/23: ▲280
- 2023/24: ▼250
- 2024/25: ▼0 (Note: Services suspended for all of the 2024/25 period (April 2024 to March 2025))
- 2025/26: ▲172
Location
Notes
- Passenger statistics from the Office of Rail and Road

Altnabreac railway station (/ˌæltnəˈbrɛk/) is a rural railway station in the Highland council area of Scotland. It serves the area of Altnabreac – a settlement in which the station itself is the main component – in the historic county of Caithness. The name Altnabreac derives from the Scots Gaelic Allt nam Breac, meaning "the stream of the trout". The station is on the Far North Line, 133 miles 76 chains (215.6 km) from Inverness, situated between Forsinard and Scotscalder. The station is managed by ScotRail. Services were suspended on 12 November 2023 due to an access dispute with a neighbouring property, but resumed on 6 April 2025.

== History ==
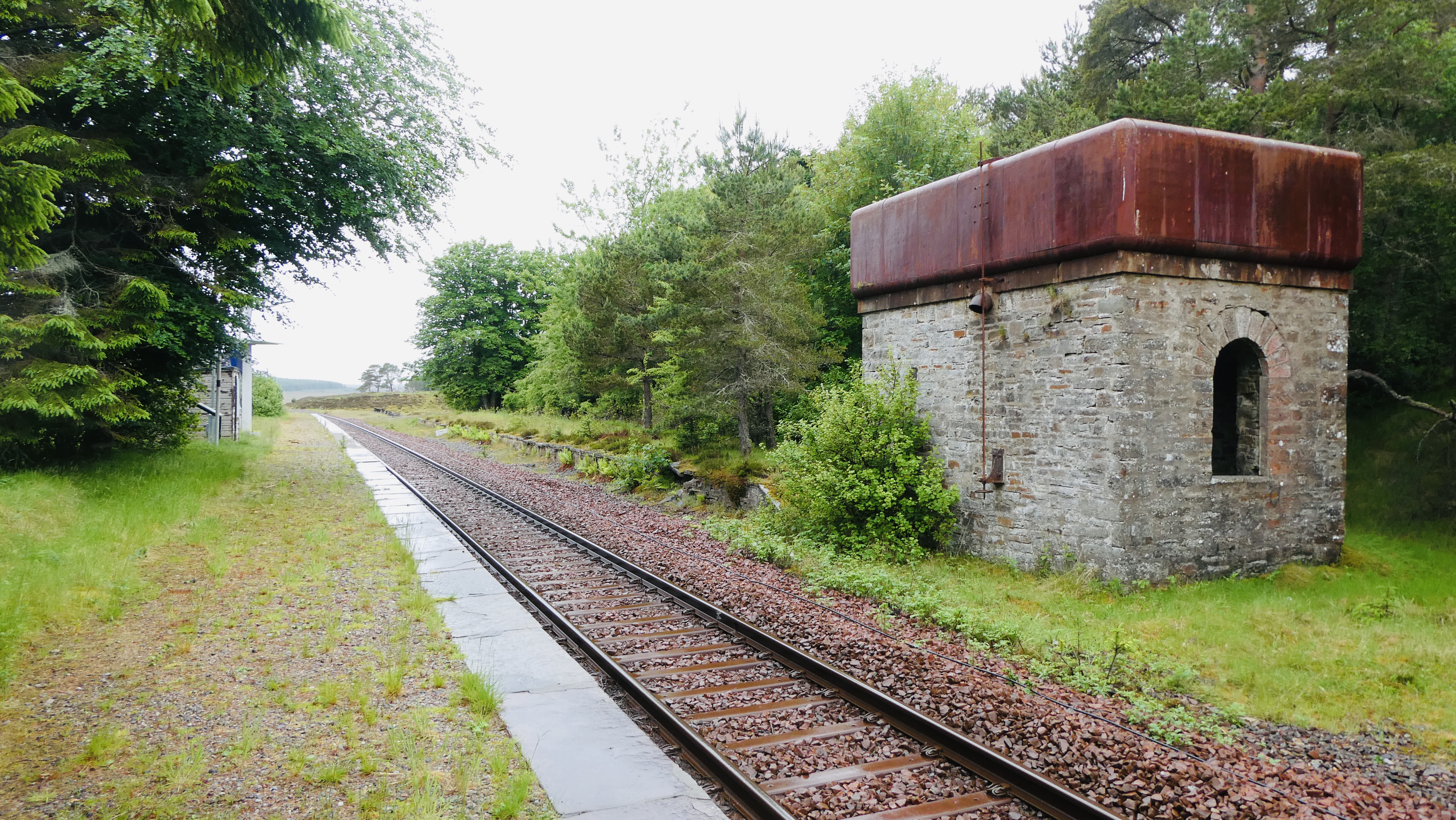
The station looking southwest. Note the old water tank in the foreground, and the overgrown disused platform to its left.

The station was opened by the Sutherland and Caithness Railway on 28 July 1874, and later absorbed by the Highland Railway.

The reason for the station's construction is a mystery. At the time of construction it was 8 miles (13 km) from the nearest settlement and 10 miles (16 km) from the nearest road. The only source of traffic at the station, Lochdhu Lodge, approximately 1.5 miles (2.4 km) to the south, was not built until the 1890s. However, it had a passing loop with a water tank so may have been established for purely operational reasons. The water tank has not seen regular use since 1962.

On 5 July 1988, The Independent newspaper published an article about the disposal of nuclear waste and one of the sites being considered was Altnabreac due to its remoteness and geology of the area and that if chosen the nuclear waste would be transported by train from Sellafield. In 2021, Highland Council approved the construction for a timber loading terminal near the station.

=== Access dispute and temporary closure ===
From Sunday 12 November 2023, ScotRail trains temporarily stopped calling at Altnabreac due to an altercation between the owner of a neighbouring property, ScotRail and Network Rail, centring around access to the station.

On 21 November 2023, The Times published an article stating that a meeting was to take place the following Monday. In attendance would be representatives from British Transport Police, business leaders, Network Rail, Police Scotland, politicians, and ScotRail to consider issuing a compulsory buy-back order on the property evicting the couple from their home.

On 24 November 2023, Appleby and his partner stated that they were being harassed by ScotRail drivers who were sounding their trains' horns as they passed, and denied claims by the previous residents that they had chained themselves up to stop railworkers access to the station and track, when they had only installed a chain on their gate instead. They also claimed that Network Rail had damaged their property by digging holes on it and leaving them open.

On 15 May 2024, the case against Appleby was dropped due to a lack of corroboration. The civil dispute between neighbouring property and Network Rail remains ongoing following the resumption of service.

=== Accidents and incidents ===
On 21 September 1898, a Highland Railway mail train was almost involved in a collision with a platelayer's trolley that had been left on the track. One of the platelayers, John Morrison noticed the train coming down the track at high speeds, so he scrambled to get the trolley off the track. He succeeded in getting the trolley off the track before the train collided with it but was killed in the process.

In January 1978, a train from Inverness to Wick became trapped in a blizzard with approximately 70 passengers on board. A rescue locomotive was sent to recover the train but was also stranded in snow. Some were rescued by helicopter the day afterwards.

== Location ==
The station is on a private dirt road about 5 miles (8 km) long. Being 12 miles (19 km) from the nearest village, Westerdale, Altnabreac is often listed as one of Britain's most geographically isolated railway stations. As a result, the station cannot be served by rail replacement buses. Dixe Wills says of the area:

"What is all the more remarkable is that the following events took place in the vicinity of the most remote station on my itinerary, a place girded round by peat-black lochs and dismal bogs and overshadowed by dark, anonymous plantations of doomed conifers, where nothing of any note has happened these past 70 years save for intense despondent brooding."

== Facilities ==
The station has a small waiting shelter, as well as a seat, a cycle rack and a help point. There are no facilities to purchase tickets, so passengers must either buy one in advance or from the guard on the train.

On 20 December 2022, Transport Scotland introduced a new "Press & Ride" at some request stops along the line, following successful trials of the system at Scotscalder over the previous four months. Previously, passengers wishing to board a train at Scotscalder had to flag the train by raising their arm (as is still done at other request stops around the country); this meant that the driver needed to reduce the train's speed before a request stop (to look out for any potential passengers on the platform and be able to stop if necessary), even if the platform was empty. The new system consists of an automatic kiosk (with a button for passengers to press) at the platform; this will alert the driver about any waiting passengers in advance and, if there is no requirement to stop, the train can maintain line speed through the request stops, thus improving reliability on the whole line. Altnabreac was planned to receive the system sometime in 2023, along with Dunrobin Castle, although this was delayed until after the station had reopened in 2025.

== Passenger volume ==
The main origin or destination station for journeys to or from Altnabreac in the 2022–23 period was Thurso, making up 104 of the 280 journeys (37.1%). The station is mostly used by walkers, exploring the Highland countryside, and railway enthusiasts.

Passenger volume at Altnabreac
	2004–05	2005–06	2006–07	2007–08	2008–09	2009–10	2010–11	2011–12	2012–13	2013–14	2014–15	2015–16	2016–17	2017–18	2018–19	2019–20	2020–21	2021–22	2022–23	2023–24	2024–25
Entries and exits	164	171	222	177	212	156	172	238	296	138	240	312	356	658	408	232	46	230	280	250	0

The statistics cover twelve month periods that start in April.

== Services ==
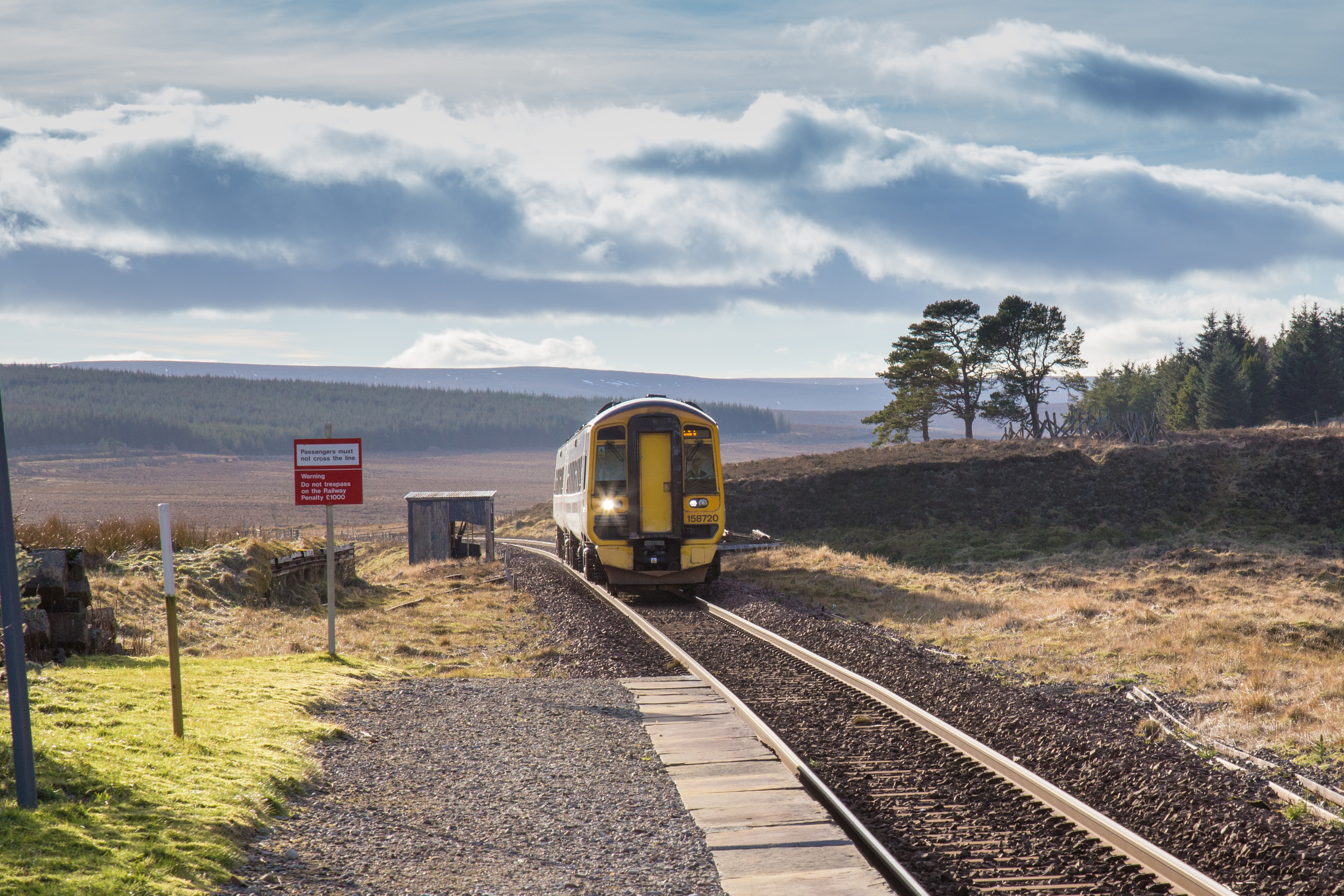
A Class 158 approaching Altnabreac railway station

On weekdays and Saturdays, the service pattern from the station consists of four trains per day northbound to Wick via Thurso and three trains per day southbound to Inverness via Helmsdale, Golspie, Lairg, Tain and Dingwall. On Sundays there is just one train per day each way.

The station is designated as a request stop requiring that passengers intending to alight inform the guard in advance, and any passengers wishing to board must ensure they have used the Press & Ride facility. This notifies the driver that a stop is required.

Preceding station	National Rail	Following station
Forsinard	ScotRail; Far North Line	Scotscalder

== Community rail ==
The station, along with all others on the Far North Line, are overseen and promoted by the Far North Line Community Rail Partnership.

== Bibliography ==
- Brailsford, Martyn, ed. (December 2017) [1987]. Railway Track Diagrams 1: Scotland & Isle of Man (6th ed.). Frome: Trackmaps. ISBN 978-0-9549866-9-8.
- Butt, R. V. J. (October 1995). The Directory of Railway Stations: details every public and private passenger station, halt, platform and stopping place, past and present (1st ed.). Sparkford: Patrick Stephens Ltd. ISBN 978-1-85260-508-7. OCLC 60251199. OL 11956311M.
- Jowett, Alan (March 1989). Jowett's Railway Atlas of Great Britain and Ireland: From Pre-Grouping to the Present Day (1st ed.). Sparkford: Patrick Stephens Ltd. ISBN 978-1-85260-086-0. OCLC 22311137.
- Wills, Dixe (2014). Tiny Stations (Paperback, 1st reprint ed.). Basingstoke: AA Publishing. ISBN 978-0-7495-7732-2.
