= Scotscalder =

Coordinates: 58.48°N 3.55°W

- Location within the Caithness area
- Population: 190
- OS grid reference: ND09625614
  - Edinburgh: 175 mi (282 km)
  - London: 500 mi (800 km)
- Council area: Highland
- Lieutenancy area: Caithness
- Country: Scotland
- Sovereign state: United Kingdom
- Post town: Scotscalder
- Postcode district: KW12
- Dialling code: 01847
- UK Parliament: Caithness, Sutherland and Easter Ross
- Scottish Parliament: Caithness, Sutherland and Ross

Scots Calder is an area within Halkirk, Northern Scotland. It is served by Scotscalder railway station which is operated by ScotRail. The B870 runs directly through the centre with Achagie and Thurso to the north and Olgrinmore and Westerdale to the south. It is operated under the Highland Authority. A small car park, with 2 spaces, can be found at Scotscalder railway station that is open, free, 24 hours a day. There are no bus services operating from Scotscalder however a short walk or train journey can take you to local travel services.

== Historic discoveries ==
There are several historic archaeological discoveries in the area surrounding Scotscalder ranging from the Romans to the Celts suggesting that there have been settlements here for millennia. Artefacts that are believed to date from the Iron Age have been found within the Scotscalder area.

== Railway station ==
Scotscalder railway station is a request stop on the Far North Line and has trains running in both directions towards Wick in the North and Inverness further South. Passenger numbers have decreased annually to a record low for 2018. This makes it one of the least used stations in the whole of the UK and the least used on the Far North Line

== Local area ==
The local area surrounding and within Scotscalder is relatively small. There a few small settlements and farms in the area and the River Thurso runs nearby. The road that runs through Scotscalder is only wide enough to fit one car but has several passing places. 3 miles north of Scotscalder, via the B870 you can find Loch Calder and 8 miles north of Scotscalder will take you into Thurso. Within Scotscalder itself there isn't much. The nearest Post Office and other amenities can be found in Halkirk, five miles up the road. Walking from one place to another isn't advised due to lack of footpaths and long distances between villages sometimes.

== Local history ==
Scotscalder's local area as it is known today was shaped by the Far North Line opening in 1874. The station is still standing and is the centrepiece of the area. Further settlements were constructed as the railway allowed businesses to make the most of the generally flat land that was available. It also allowed easy travel to Thurso, Wick and Inverness. The construction of the road, which possibly previously existed as a farm track or pack-horse route also allowed easy access to the nearby village of Halkirk where products could be sold locally.
