= Flow Country =

Region of peatland and wetland in the north of Scotland

The Flow Country
UNESCO World Heritage Site
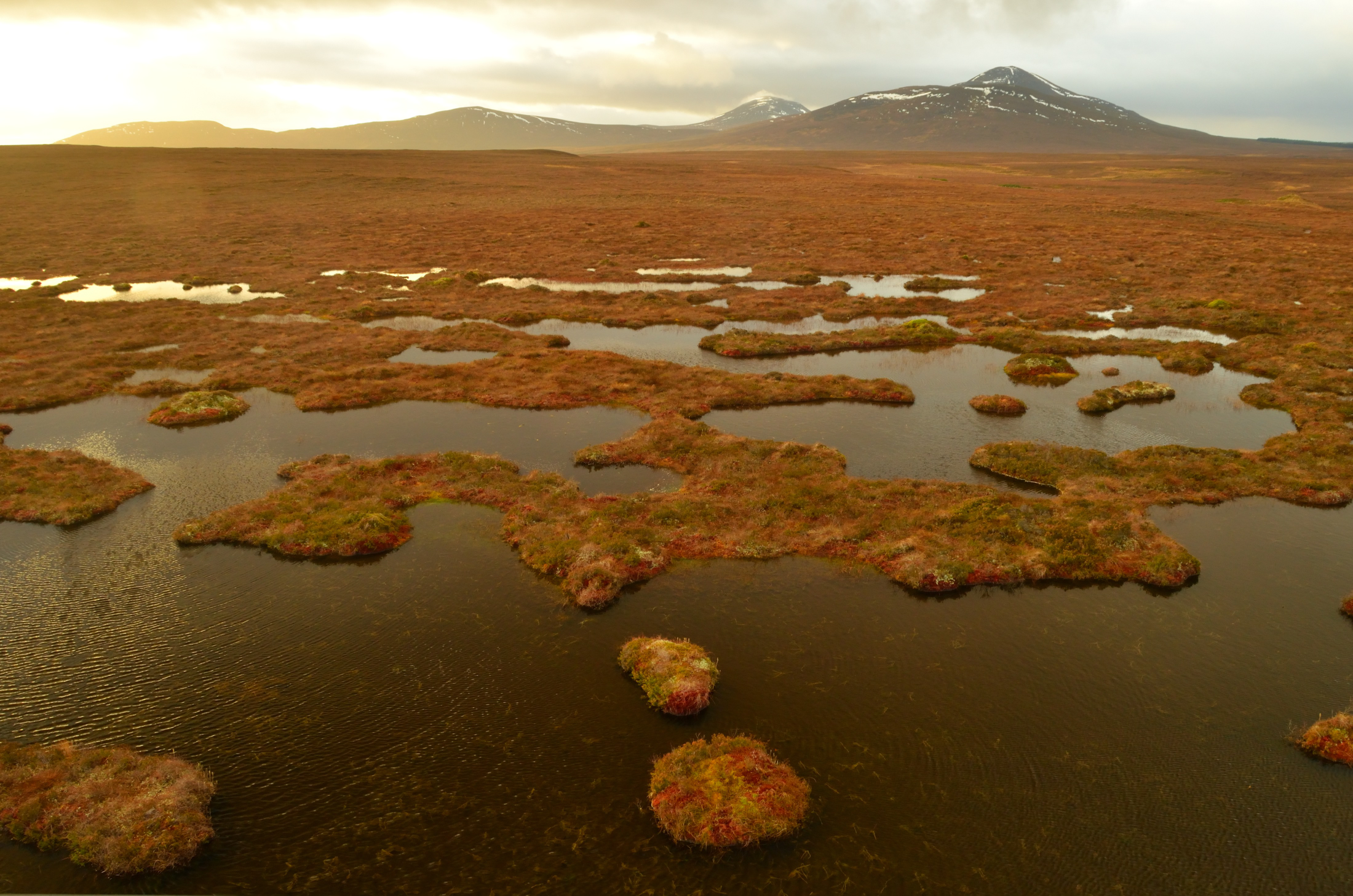
- The Flow Country, Forsinard, Sutherland, looking towards the Ben Griams

- Location within Scotland
- Location: Scotland
- Criteria: Natural: ix
- Reference: 1722
- Inscription: 2024 (46th Session)
- Area: 187,000 ha (460,000 acres)
- Coordinates: 58.4°N 3.7°W

The Flow Country (Scottish Gaelic: Dùthaich nam Boglaichean) is a vast area of bog peatland in Caithness and Sutherland, northern Scotland. It is the largest blanket bog in Europe, and covers about 4,000 km^{2} (1,500 mi^{2}). It is an area of deep peat, dotted with bog pools, and is a very important habitat for wildlife. As peat is largely made up of the remains of plants, which are themselves made up of carbon, it locks up large stores of carbon for thousands of years. This carbon would otherwise be released to the atmosphere and contribute to global warming. In 2024 the Flow Country was awarded World Heritage status by UNESCO on account of its unparalleled blanket bog habitat. It includes the Forsinard Flows National Nature Reserve and the Caithness and Sutherland Peatlands.

== Wildlife ==
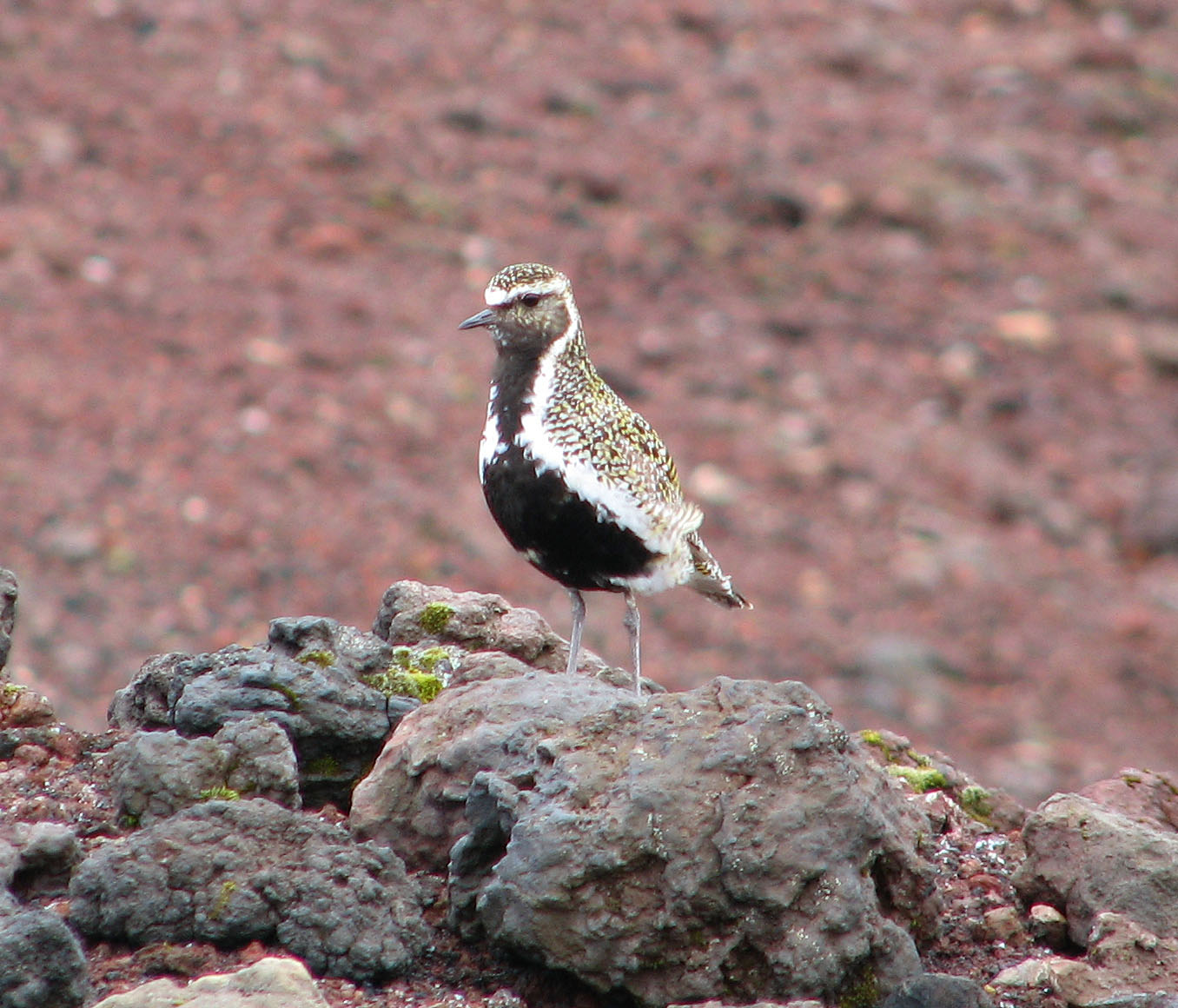
Golden Plover, a typical Flow Country bird

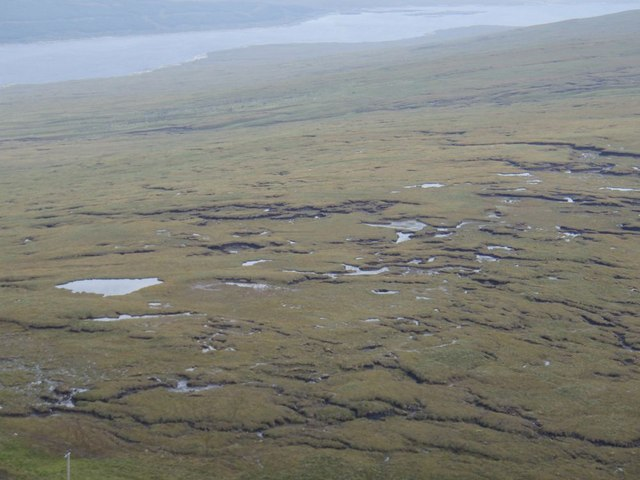
The Flow Country

The Flow Country is home to a rich variety of wildlife, and is used as a breeding ground for many different species of birds, including greenshank, dunlin, merlin and golden plover. Birds of prey found in the Flow Country include the buzzard and hen harrier.

One of the most prevalent plant species of the Flow Country is sphagnum moss, which can store large amounts of water, and eventually form peat – the building block of a blanket bog. Carnivorous plants such as roundleaved sundew, greater sundew, and butterwort feed on the multitude of insects that inhabit the Flow Country.

Large mammals such as red deer, and the less common roe deer, roam the Flow Country all year round and can be heard roaring during the autumn rutting season.

== Geology ==
The principal geological deposit within the area is of course peat but other Quaternary superficial deposits are recorded, principally those associated with the ice age such as till but also post-glacial alluvium. All of these overlie bedrock which originates during four distinct intervals of geological time; the Archaean to Palaeoproterozoic Lewisian gneiss, the Neoproterozoic Moine succession into which Ordovician to Silurian granite is intruded and the largely Devonian age Old Red Sandstone.

== History ==
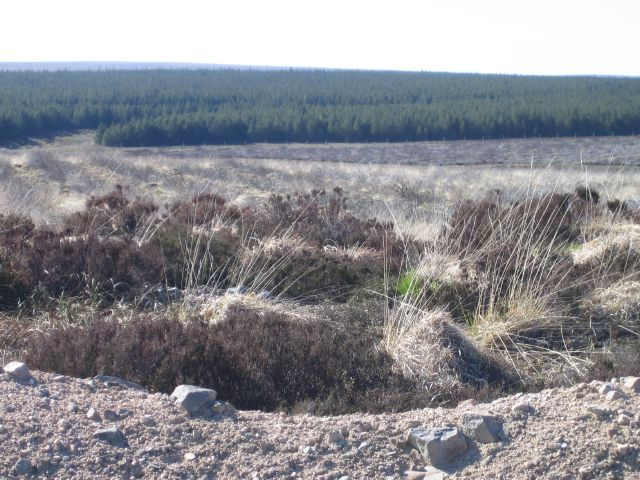
Cleared forestry; part of the habitat restoration in the Flow Country

"Flow" is a Scots word for a bog or morass, possibly derived from Old Norse (compare the Icelandic word flói, which has the same meaning). The bogs of the Flow Country have been subject to human activity since the end of the last ice age. In the last 200 years, they have been affected by human activity, including sheep grazing and forestry.

In the 1970s and 1980s, government tax breaks incentivised commercial forestry operations which drained areas of the bogs and planted non-native conifers, damaging the bogs and causing loss of some of the peatland. In 1987 the Nature Conservancy Council (NCC) released a report in London that was highly critical of the foresters. In the Finance Act 1988 Nigel Lawson, the Chancellor of the Exchequer, scrapped the forestry tax reliefs in light of the harm caused to the United Kingdom's wilderness, halting further planting.

== Ongoing conservation ==
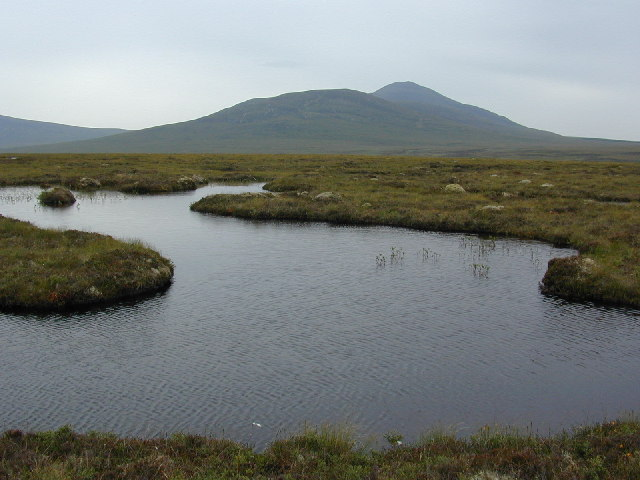
RSPB Forsinard Flows National Nature Reserve, Sutherland

In an effort to restore the damage, the Royal Society for the Protection of Birds (RSPB) have bought a large area in the centre of the Flow Country and have created the Forsinard Flows national nature reserve. More than 20 km^{2} has been bought back from Fountain Forestry and the young trees felled and allowed to rot in the plough furrow in the hope and expectation that, in 30 to 100 years, the land will revert to peat bog.

The RSPB was also a leading partner in the Flows to the Future Project, an ambitious, far-reaching project which aimed to restore vast areas of the Flow Country and increase public and visitor awareness of the importance of the Flow Country. The project funded the award-winning Flows Lookout Tower.

Around 1500 km^{2} of the Flow Country is protected as both a Special Protection Area and Special Area of Conservation under the name Caithness and Sutherland Peatlands.

The Flow Country was designated a UNESCO World Heritage Site in 2024. It is one of three World Heritage natural landscapes in the United Kingdom. The others are the Giants Causeway in County Antrim and the Jurassic Coast in Dorset.

== Rail access ==
The Far North Line connects into Forsinard station serving the area.
