= Garve and Ullapool Railway =

Proposed railway in North West Scotland

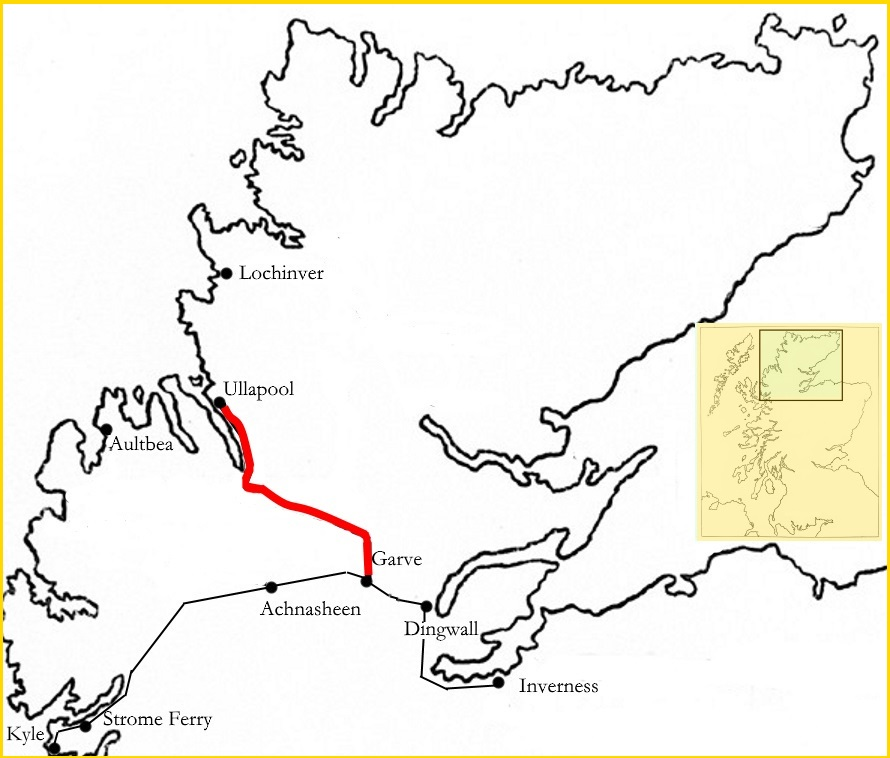
- Sketch map of the route of the projected line from Garve to Ullapool

Technical
- Line length: 33 miles 1,200 yards (54.206 km)

The Garve and Ullapool Railway was one of several branch railway-lines proposed for the North-West Highlands of Scotland, in the 1880s and 1890s. The project received approval from the Westminster Parliament by means of a local act of Parliament, the Garve and Ullapool Railway Act 1890 (53 & 54 Vict. c. ccxxxiii), of 14 August 1890. The line did not gain financial backing and was never constructed. Renewed attempts to build it were made in 1896, 1901, 1918 and 1945, again with no success.

== Social background ==
In the early 1880s, long-term deprivation and scarceness of land drove several communities on the West of Scotland to carry out acts of civil disobedience – rent-strikes and land-raids - collectively termed ‘The Crofters’ War’. This also resulted in the formation of the Highland Land League and a political party named the Crofters Party which returned several members to the Westminster Parliament. In the investigations which were set up in the aftermath of these events, principally driven by the Napier Commission of 1883, it was acknowledged that the people of the west Highlands and Islands had a justifiable grievance.

In an effort to alleviate conditions, proposals were made, firstly, to reform the laws of land-ownership, and secondly, to develop the fisheries by opening up markets in the British cities. This latter goal was to be achieved primarily by improving transport-links (i.e. harbours and railways) between the west coast and central Scotland and the south.

All of this also came at a time when various private companies were developing – or wishing to develop – railway lines across Scotland, to capitalise on the Victorian tourist boom and the increased leisure-time of the middle- and upper-classes. Principal among these companies were Great North of Scotland Railway, the Highland Railway and the Caledonian Railway. All of these companies, and several more promoters besides, were anxious to have their proposals adopted by Parliament and – more importantly – funded from the taxpayers’ purse.

== History ==
In 1890, six lines connecting the west of north Scotland to the central spine were to be considered by a parliamentary commission. These were:

- the extension of the Dingwall and Skye Railway from Stromeferry to Kyle of Lochalsh
- the extension of the West Highland line from Banavie to Mallaig
- a line from Garve to Ullapool, leading from the Dingwall and Skye Railway
- from Achnasheen to Aultbea, also leading from the Dingwall and Skye Railway
- from Lairg to Laxford, leading from the Far North Line
- from Culrain to Lochinver, also leading from the Far North Line

All six lines were designed to open up access to new or established fishing ports and/or passenger-boat ports on the west coast.

== Proposal and route ==
The specific plan for the Garve and Ullapool Railway was first proposed in January 1889 by local landowners in the Lochbroom and Assynt area, who formally invited the Highland Railway to construct a line to Ullapool. The proposal was backed by Sir John Fowler, engineer in charge of the building of the Forth Bridge, and a number of local MPs and luminaries. The Highland Line company was not enthusiastic, since it had its own plans to drive a line through to Kyle of Lochalsh and was prepared to invest £120,000 to do so; but it agreed to conduct a brief survey, which was undertaken in July 1889, at a cost of £80.

The route laid out on the plans showed the line branching off the Dingwall to Skye line about 200 yards (183 m) east of Garve station, at a height of around three hundred feet (91 m). It then led in a north-westerly direction, following the right (south/west) bank of the Black Water river (in essence, parallelling the route of the modern A835 road); it then passed through the glen at Glascarnoch (note that Loch Glascarnoch did not exist then – it is a reservoir created in the mid-1950s ), rising to nine hundred feet (270 m) and continued as far as Braemore Lodge (where the A832 road now branches off). A steep descent of six hundred feet (180 m) in the space of three miles (4.8 km) - a challenging gradient of 1-in-26 - would have been required to bring the line to sea-level at the head of Loch Broom; but the engineers instead planned to construct a 600-yard (550 m) tunnel through the hillside on the west side of the descent, and then descend to the mouth of the River Broom, after which the line would follow the coast as far as Ullapool. The terminus would have been at the junction of Shore Street and Quay Street, at the end of the pier. The total measured distance was just over thirty-three miles (53 km) (to be precise: thirty-three miles five furlongs four chains and fifty links [54.205 km]).

An original suggestion by the proposers for an onward route between Ullapool and Lochinver was never surveyed or planned in any detail.

== Quest for backers ==
Garve and Ullapool Railway Act 1890
- Act of Parliament
- Parliament of the United Kingdom
- Long title: An Act to authorise the Construction of a Railway from Garve to Ullapool and for other purposes.
- Citation: 53 & 54 Vict. c. ccxxxiii

Dates
- Royal assent: 14 August 1890

Text of statute as originally enacted

The Garve and Ullapool Railway Act 1890 (53 & 54 Vict. c. ccxxxiii) received royal assent on 14 August 1890. In the papers relating to this act, the proprietors of the proposed railway were named as: Lady Mary Matheson of the Lewis (widow of James Matheson, 1st Baronet, and owner of the Isle of Lewis and most of Ullapool); Donald Matheson; Major Duncan Matheson; John Arthur Fowler (Sir John’s son); and Major James Houston; and the directors were named all of these except for Lady Matheson. Sir John Fowler was to be Consulting Engineer. The Crofters Party MP for Ross & Cromarty, Dr Roderick Macdonald, also backed the scheme. The cost of construction was estimated at £240,000.

The parliamentary commission of 1890 delayed in reporting its findings. In the interim, it was clear that the Highland Railway had been lobbying hard in Westminster, proposing that a grant of £45,000 from central funds would allow the extension from Stromeferry to Kyle of Lochalsh to be built. The backers of the Garve line were aware to Highland Railway’s reluctance, and met with the Great North of Scotland Railway board to suggest that it took over the construction and running of the line. In the summer of 1891, a new private bill was proposed to transfer arrangements for the construction and running of the line from the Highland Railway to the Great North of Scotland Railway Company.

The commission of inquiry published its report in the summer of 1891, recommending that the best option of the original six was the extension of the line from Stromeferry to Kyle of Lochalsh. The backers of the Ullapool line and local MPs were highly critical of this decision – noting amongst other things that there were glaring factual errors concerning the navigability of Loch Broom, and hence obstacles to establishing Ullapool as a port. But their protests were to no avail. Despite a belated attempt by the Great North of Scotland company to adopt the scheme, by a private bill on 31 May 1892, the scheme could attract no further political or financial interest.

Garve and Ullapool Railway (Abandonment) Act 1893
- Act of Parliament
- Parliament of the United Kingdom
- Long title: An Act to provide for the abandonment of the under taking authorised by the Garve and Ullapool Railway Act 1890.[dx]
- Citation: 56 & 57 Vict. c. ccxviii

Dates
- Royal assent: 24 August 1893

Text of statute as originally enacted

In June 1893, the Highland Railway Act 1893 (56 & 57 Vict. c. xci) was passed, authorising the extension of the line from Stromeferry to Kyle of Lochalsh; this was shortly followed by the Garve and Ullapool Railway (Abandonment) Act 1893 (56 & 57 Vict. c. ccxviii), dated 24 August 1893, which finally abandoned the Ullapool proposal.

== Further proposals and legacy ==
Although further railway-line extensions were authorised during the 1890s – and partly as a result of these – the Light Railways Act 1896 was passed, which encouraged the development of light railways on the west coast and the islands. John Arthur Fowler proposed that the Garve and Ullapool Railway be considered as one project under the Light Railways Act 1896 and offered it again to the Highland Railway to run. The Highland Railway replied that it would do so only if Fowler raised the capital to build it – which he was unable to do.

In 1901, Major Blunt-Mackenzie (husband of the Countess of Cromartie) proposed building the line as a 'tram-way', to support the west coast fisheries; but could get no financial backing for the scheme from the Government-backed Congested Districts Board.

Towards the end of the First World War, the Secretary of State for Scotland, Robert Munro set up the Rural Transport (Scotland) Committee, a commission to recommend improvements to the poor road, rail and sea transport facilities in Scotland. The commission invited applications from County Councils and local interest groups, for consideration of proposals. A local committee was set up in Ullapool, and made a strong case for the building of the Garve and Ullapool Railway. The Rural Transport Committee was duly impressed and, when its report appeared in April 1919, it recommended that the railway be constructed, completely funded by the government. But, along with many other schemes and radical proposals made by the Committee, nothing happened.

In 1945, Commander Vyner, a local Ullapool landowner, tried to persuade the London, Midland and Scottish Railway (LMS) to build and run the railway. The LMS estimated the cost to be £1 million and refused to have anything to do with the scheme.

The construction of the line from Garve to Ullapool was imagined in a novel by Andrew Drummond (An Abridged History…) in 2004.

== See also ==
- History of the Far North of Scotland Railway Line
- Dingwall and Skye Railway
- Highland Railway
- Loch Maree and Aultbea Railway
- Lochinver Railway
