= Loch Maree and Aultbea Railway =

Proposed railway in North-West Scotland

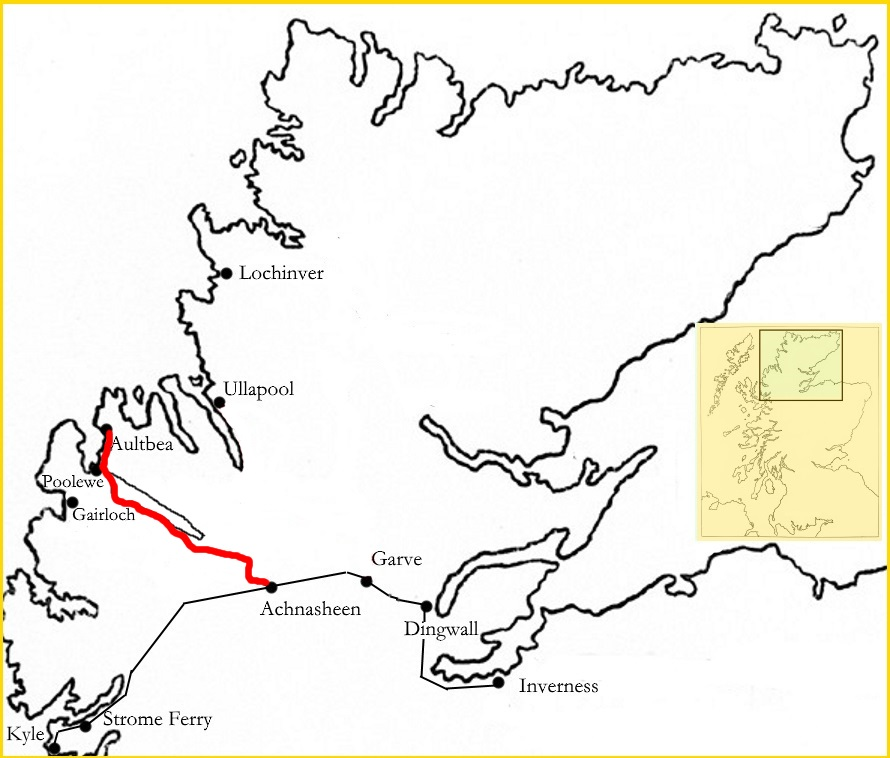
- Sketch map of the route of the projected line from Achnasheen to Aultbea

Technical
- Line length: 37 miles 620 yards (60.113 km)

The Loch Maree and Aultbea Railway was one of several branch railway-lines proposed for the North-West Highlands of Scotland in the early 1890s. Although a full survey was conducted in 1892 and a private bill was submitted to the Westminster Parliament on 18 November 1892, the necessary act of Parliament to permit construction did not receive approval and the plan was dropped.

== Historical background ==
In 1890 and 1891, six lines connecting the west of north Scotland to the central spine were to be considered by two parliamentary commissions. These were:

- the extension of the Dingwall and Skye Railway from Stromeferry to Kyle of Lochalsh
- the extension of the West Highland line from Banavie to Mallaig

and new branch-lines from:

- Garve to Ullapool, leading from the Dingwall and Skye Railway
- Achnasheen to Aultbea, also leading from the Dingwall and Skye Railway
- Lairg to Laxford, leading from the Far North Line
- Culrain to Lochinver, also leading from the Far North Line

All six lines were designed to open up transport facilities for fish-catches, passengers and mail on the west coast, and - for the last four named above - specifically for steamer services to Stornoway. The two extensions to Mallaig and Kyle of Lochalsh were completed, however none of the four additional proposals were ever built.

== Proposal and route ==
A scheme for a railway to run between Achnasheen and Aultbea was first proposed in early 1889 by landowners in the Gairloch and Loch Ewe area. The main proposers were: Sir Kenneth Mackenzie of Gairloch; the 2nd Earl of Lovelace; Duncan Darroch of Gourock and Torridon; Paul Liot Bankes of Letterewe; and John Dixon of Inveran. Dixon was the principal driver in the campaign to attract support and funding. Between 1890 and 1892, he composed dozens of letters, memoranda and pamphlets, and sent them to the Scottish Office, MPs and Cabinet Ministers in London; and he organised or encouraged public meetings in the Gairloch area and on the Isle of Lewis. As well as stressing the advantages for fisheries and passenger-traffic, the campaign flagged up the potential for increased tourist-traffic to the area. Many of the arguments put forward were deliberately phrased to show that the Aultbea proposal was far better than the rival Garve and Ullapool Railway which, in August 1890, had already received an approval for its act of Parliament, the Garve and Ullapool Railway Act 1890 (53 & 54 Vict. c. ccxxxiii).

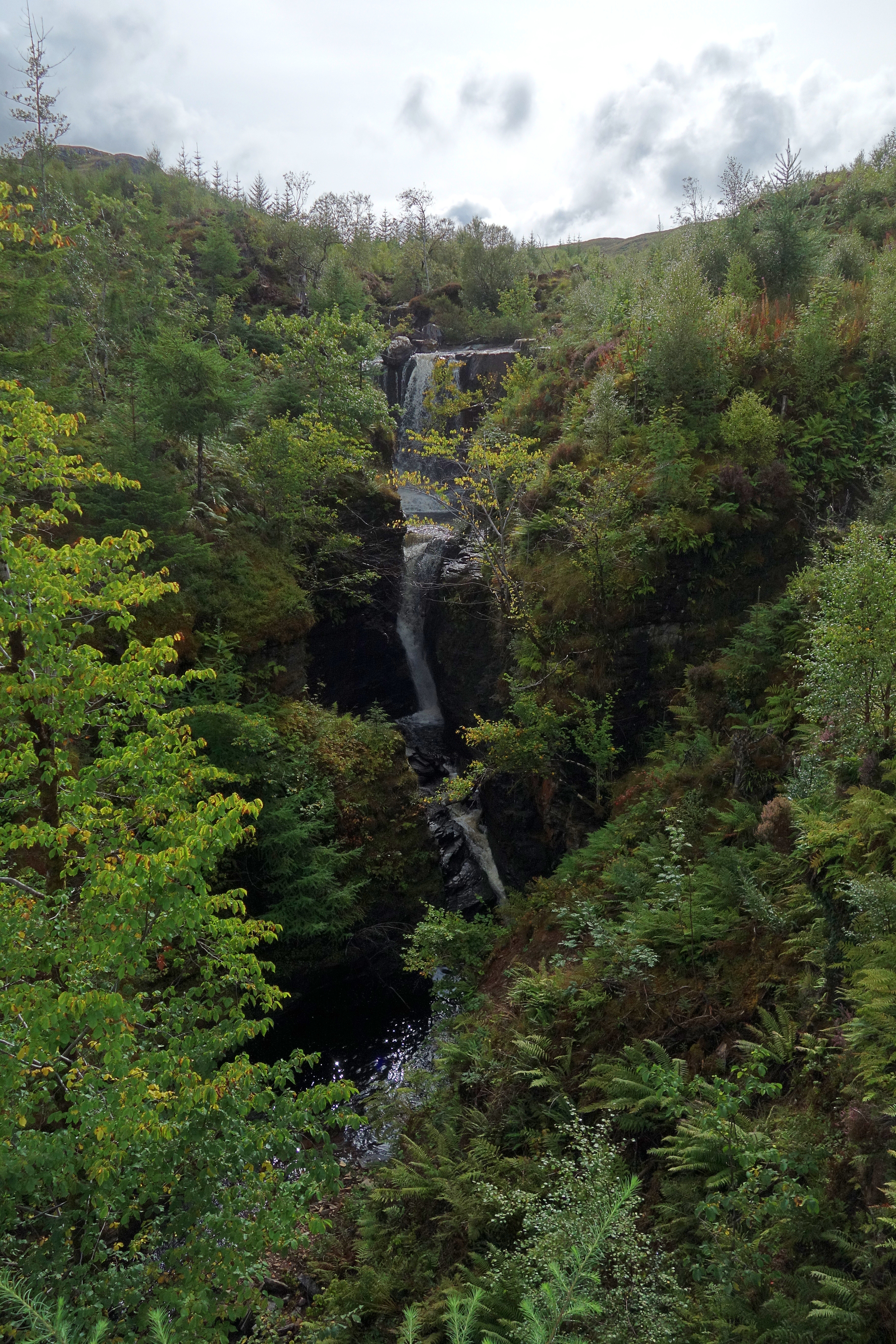
Victoria Falls, named following a visit by Queen Victoria.

The route was surveyed by the firm of Thomas Meik & Sons in the autumn of 1892. Their plans showed the line branching off the Dingwall to Skye line about 150 yards (137 m) south-west of Achnasheen station, at a height of around 520 feet (158 m) above sea-level. It circled round the back of Ledgowan Lodge, passed south of Loch a'Chroisg, and remained well south of the road to take advantage of the hillside contours, before looping in a reverse S-shape north, east and then west to enter Glen Docherty. There was an ascent up the hill to the highest point on the line (750 feet (229 m)); a descent of the glen on its southern slope at a gradient of 1:33 for 3 miles (4.8 km); down to the western end of the glen; then it circled south of the village of Kinlochewe on a tall viaduct; and then rejoined the road (now the A832). Then it hugged the south shore of Loch Maree as far as Slattadale, passing the famous Victoria Falls en route. Where the road then veered due west towards Gairloch, the railway instead headed north along the shore, straight for Poolewe. Two tunnels would have to be built near the north-west end of Loch Maree. After bending around the south side of Poolewe, the line headed northwards along the east shore of Loch Ewe, passing round the back of Osgood Mackenzie's Inverewe estate and terminating at the shore-end of the pier at Aultbea. A new pier was to be constructed, 180 yards (165 m) in length. The total measured distance of the line from Achnasheen to Aultbea was just over thirty-seven miles (60 km) - to be precise: 37 miles 2 furlongs 9 chains and 20 yards. The total cost was estimated to be in the region of £200,000.

== Abandonment ==
Despite all the efforts of Dixon and his fellow-proposers, the proposal was completely rejected by the 'North-West Coast of Scotland Railways Committee' which was tasked in 1891 with recommending which of the six railways (above) should receive Governmental approval. This rejection did not prevent the backers from arranging their Private Bill. But, despite the Bill receiving a second reading in the House of Commons in April 1893, no further support was forthcoming, no Act was passed, and the scheme was dropped.

== See also ==
- History of the Far North of Scotland Railway Line
- Dingwall and Skye Railway
- Highland Railway
- Garve and Ullapool Railway
- Lochinver Railway
