= Lochinver railway =

Proposed railway in North-West Scotland

Culrain to Lochinver Railway
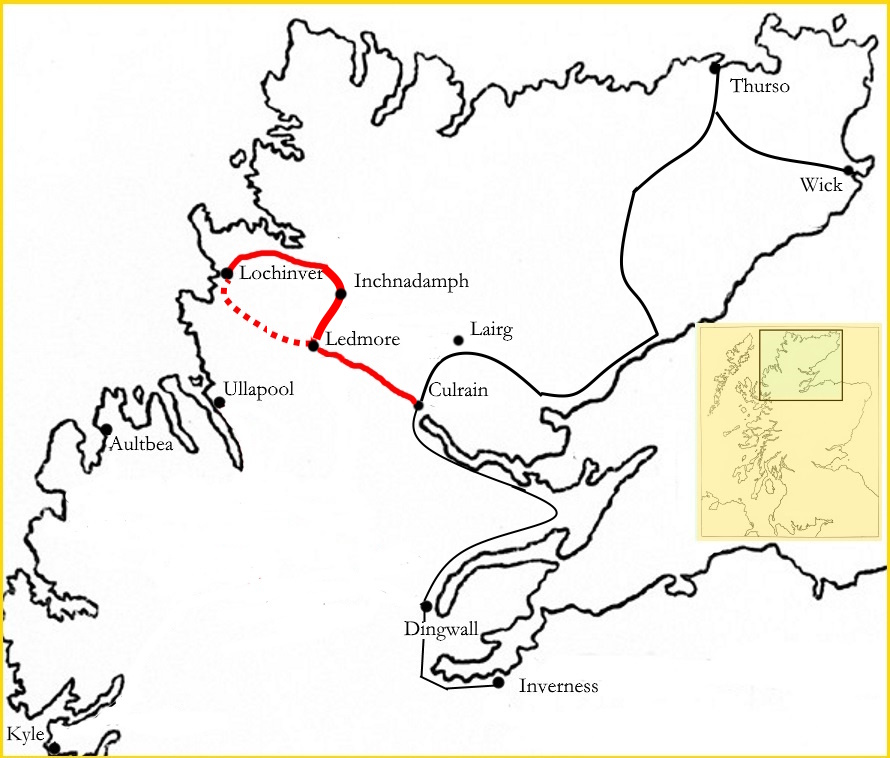
- Sketch map of the route of the projected lines from Culrain to Lochinver

Technical
- Line length: 40 miles (64 km)

The Culrain to Lochinver Railway was one of several branch railway-lines proposed for the North-West Highlands of Scotland in the early 1890s. Although a survey was conducted around 1896, the plan received no backing from either the Highland Railway Company nor the Scottish Office. Attempts were later made in the 1920s and 1930s to revive the proposal, but equally ended in failure.

== Historical background ==
In 1890 and 1891, six lines connecting the west of north Scotland to the central spine were to be considered by two Parliamentary Commissions. These were:

- the extension of the Dingwall and Skye Railway from Stromeferry to Kyle of Lochalsh
- the extension of the West Highland line from Banavie to Mallaig

and new branch-lines from:

- Garve to Ullapool, leading from the Dingwall and Skye Railway
- Achnasheen to Aultbea, also leading from the Dingwall and Skye Railway
- Lairg to Laxford, leading from the Far North Line
- Culrain to Lochinver, also leading from the Far North Line

All six lines were designed to open up transport facilities for fish-catches, passengers and mail on the west coast, and - for the last four named above - specifically for steamer services to Stornoway. The two extensions to Mallaig and Kyle of Lochalsh were completed, however none of the four additional proposals were ever built.

== Initial proposal ==
Along with the other proposed branch lines to the west coast, the route for the Culrain to Lochinver railway was visited by several commissions sent from London. In 1890, a commission led by Spencer Walpole toured the proposed railway routes and met with interested parties, then issued a report In the following year, another commission, headed by Major-General Charles Hutchinson undertook a similar journey, and issued its report in 1892 These reports filtered back to the Scottish Secretary, but ultimately none of the proposals or recommendations was ever acted upon. In May 1892 the Scottish Secretary Lord Lothian received a deputation in his Whitehall office. It was led by the 3rd Duke of Sutherland, and included Angus Sutherland - one of the Crofters Party MPs - and a resident of Lochinver. (It should be noted here that the Duke of Sutherland was promoting the Lochinver line against the rival Lairg to Laxford line; the latter’s route would take it either through or immediately adjacent to the Duke’s own Reay Forest Estate, and he was strongly opposed to that.) The group pressed Lochinver’s claim for a railway, citing the reports of Walpole and Hutchinson. But no further action is recorded.

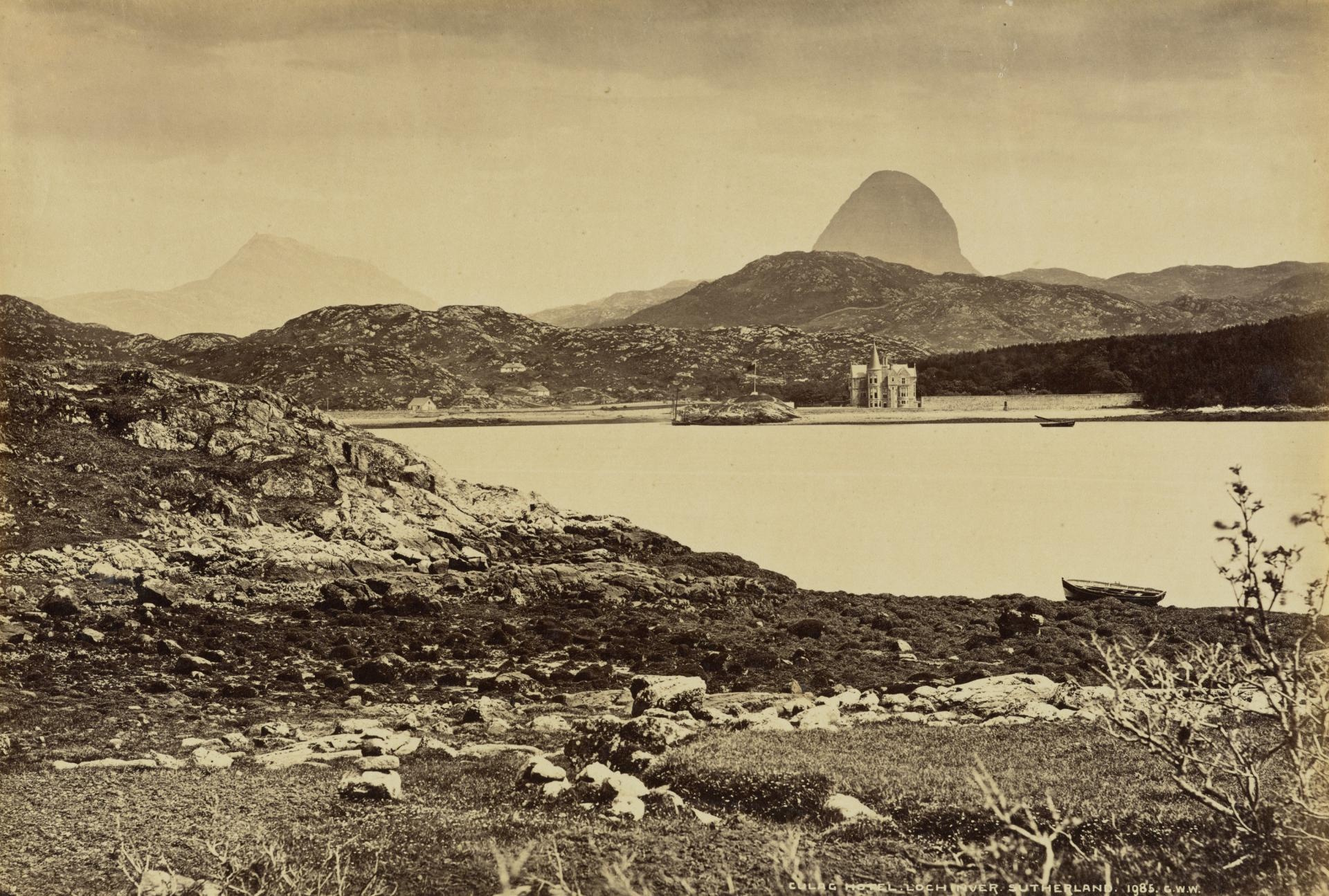
Photo across Loch Inver to the Culag Hotel, with Suilven mountain beyond

== Routes ==
There is a map, stitched together from four separate Ordnance Survey maps and pasted to a cloth backing, held by the National Records of Scotland, and on it the southern route is traced in red ink, with each passing mile carefully marked. This map would have been put together by qualified surveyors to support the proposal for building the line, and submitted to the Scottish Office in London. The proposed railway would branch off from the Far North Line at Culrain Station, and head north-westwards, following the south bank of the Oykel River. The next station on the line is likely to have been Oykel Bridge, 'Mile 14' on the annotated Ordnance Survey map, although a halt near the village of Invercassley cannot be excluded. The line continued to follow the south bank of the Oykel River, crossing the road near Caplich, before rejoining the road about 3 miles (4.8 km) miles south-east of Aultnacealgach (marked as 'Mile 25' from Culrain). There may well have been a planned halt here, since there was a hotel, frequented by anglers. It then proceeded to the hamlet of Ledmore ('Mile 25').

It is evident from sketch maps produced by the Walpole Commission and later official reports that the proposed line would then continue north-westwards from Ledmore (near Elphin, through Inchnadamph, along the north shore of Loch Assynt, and enter Lochinver from the north-east. But it is clear that an alternative route was being touted. The Hutchinson report of 1892 notes: 'The length of such a line [to Lochinver] would be about 38 or 43 miles, according as its western section is arranged to pass south or north of Loch Assynt and the Suilven hill.' On the annotated Ordnance Survey map held by the National Records of Scotland, the line is shown as leading from Ledmore, then along the north bank of Loch Veyatie for five miles, then crossing a river and passing to the south of Fionn Loch, and making its way to join the coast road at Strathan, before entering Lochinver ('Mile 40') from the south, and terminating at the Culag Hotel.

The southern route, though shorter, would have presented significant construction problems,due to the lack of flat and dry ground available between mountain and loch.

== Later proposals ==
Several further attempts were made to promote the railway. In 1896, after the publication of the Light Railways Act, letters and memorials were sent from supporters in Lochinver to the Scottish office in London, citing the reports from the 1890s and suggesting that the Highland Railway Co. was willing to construct the line. The proposal received no support in London. By now, the idea of a southern route had been dropped, and this and subsequent proposals suggested the northern route via Loch Assynt.

In 1918, the Rural Transport (Scotland) Committee was sent out by the Westminster government to look at Scottish transportation issues generally. Among their seventeen strong recommendations for new railways was for the construction of a branch railway to Lochinver from Culrain. This recommendation was one of many which the Government subsequently ignored, preferring to put money into building roads for motorised cars and lorries.

In 1925, and again in 1929, two separate attempts were made by the Irish politician and railway enthusiast, Jeremiah MacVeagh, to interest various Westminster governments in building the railway to Lochinver, this time with the stated aim of reducing unemployment and improving the Scottish rural economy. He was assisted in his endeavours by the light railway promoter, Colonel Holman Stephens. But once again, no government minister could be persuaded to pursue the matter.

== See also ==
- History of the Far North of Scotland Railway Line
- Dingwall and Skye Railway
- Highland Railway
- Garve and Ullapool Railway
