= Loch Ewe distillery =

Coordinates: 57.83445°N 5.57418°W

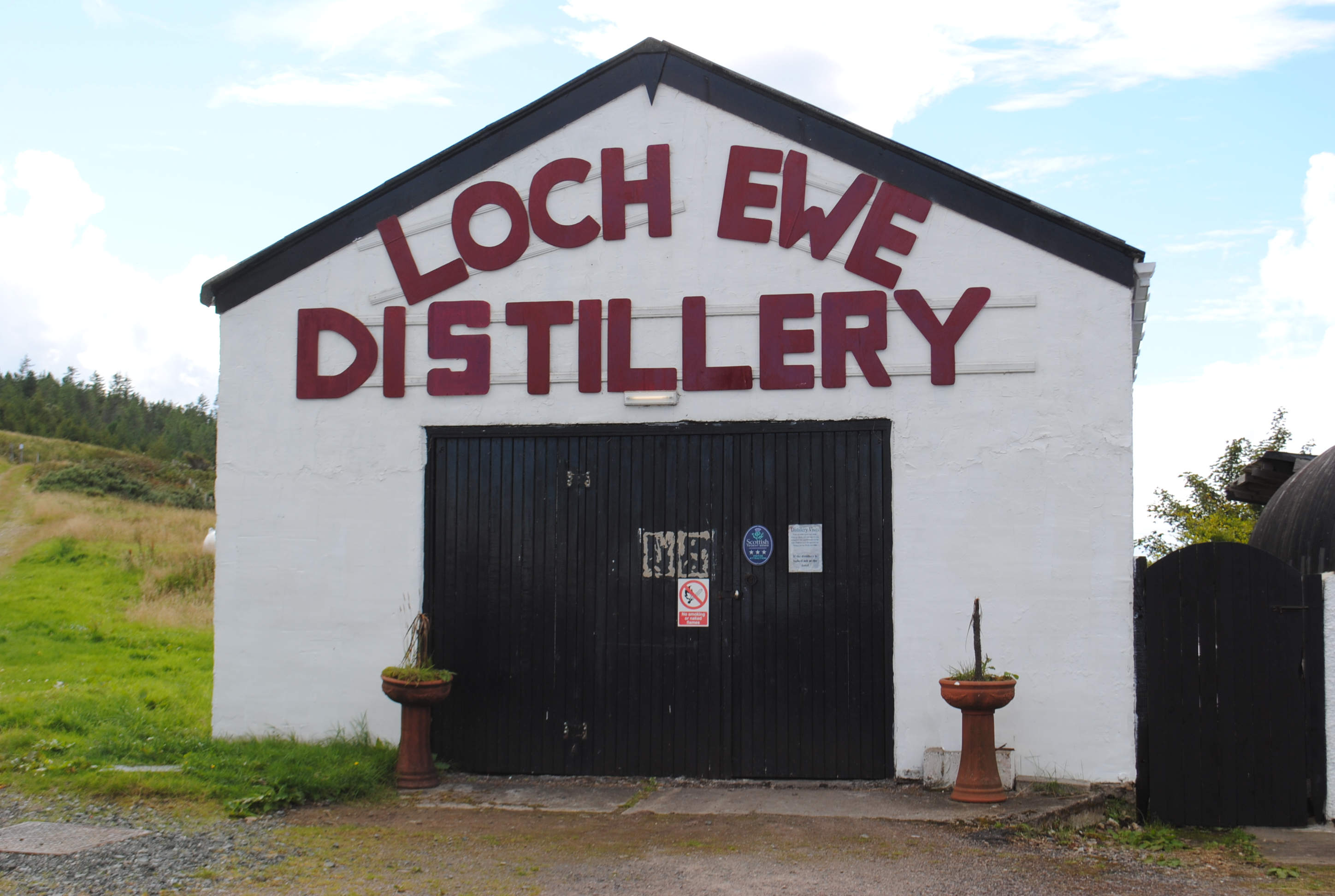
- Distillery in 2010
- Location: Drumchork near Aultbea, Scottish Highlands
- Owner: John Clotworthy
- Status: Closed
- Website: Official website

Loch Ewe distillery in Drumchork near Aultbea in the Scottish Highlands was the smallest legally operated distillery in Scotland. It was set up in 2005 by the owner of the Drumchork Lodge Hotel in a disused garage behind the hotel under the slogan Distillery in a Cave. After being put up for sale in 2015, the distillery closed permanently in 2017.

== History ==
Loch Ewe distillery was founded in November 2005 by John Clotworthy, the hotelier of the Drumchork Lodge Hotel in Aultbea and started its business in 2006. By then, the founder had already been Whisky Ambassador of the Scottish Licensed Trade Association, which represents publicans, restaurateurs, hoteliers, night club owners as well as manufacturers and sellers of alcoholic beverages. He converted an old garage behind his hotel to a distillery using the slogan Distillery in a Cave.

The project started with a budget limit of £50,000. The company used small, flame heated stills, as they were common with the moonshiners in Wester Ross. These can only be filled with 120 litres of mash per batch, fifteen times less than the minimum batch size of professional stills. By using a loophole in the 1786 Wash Act, which has subsequently been closed, the distillery acquired a licence after three years of negotiation, so that it could be operated fully legally. Smaller stills of one to five litres content are also available, to enable the participants of training courses to distil their own whisky. The whisky is typically sold after six weeks in small bottles, because the bonded store is relatively small in comparison to the demand.

After being put up for sale in 2015, the distillery closed permanently in 2017.

== Manufacturing process ==
The distillery used an ancient process to extract the alcohol from locally produced mash ingredients. It puts a copper alembic with a downward-sloping tube, similar to those used in 200 BC in Ancient Egypt, on top of the copper pot containing the liquid to be distilled.
