= History of the Far North of Scotland Railway Line =

The Far North Line was built in several stages through sparsely populated and undulating terrain within the Highland area of Scotland. Extending to 161 miles (259 km), it runs north from Inverness to Wick and Thurso in Caithness, and currently carries a regular passenger train service.

It was completed in 1874, running round the western margin of the firths north of Inverness and then keeping to the coast as far as Helmsdale. From that point it turns inland through Forsinard, returning to the far north-east coast at Wick and Thurso.

Some intermediate stations were closed in 1960 but despite the construction of major road bridges across the firths significantly shortening the route by road, the line has seen some revival at the southern end due to housing development, and it has a secure future. The original through route of 1874 remains in use.

== Inverness to Dingwall ==
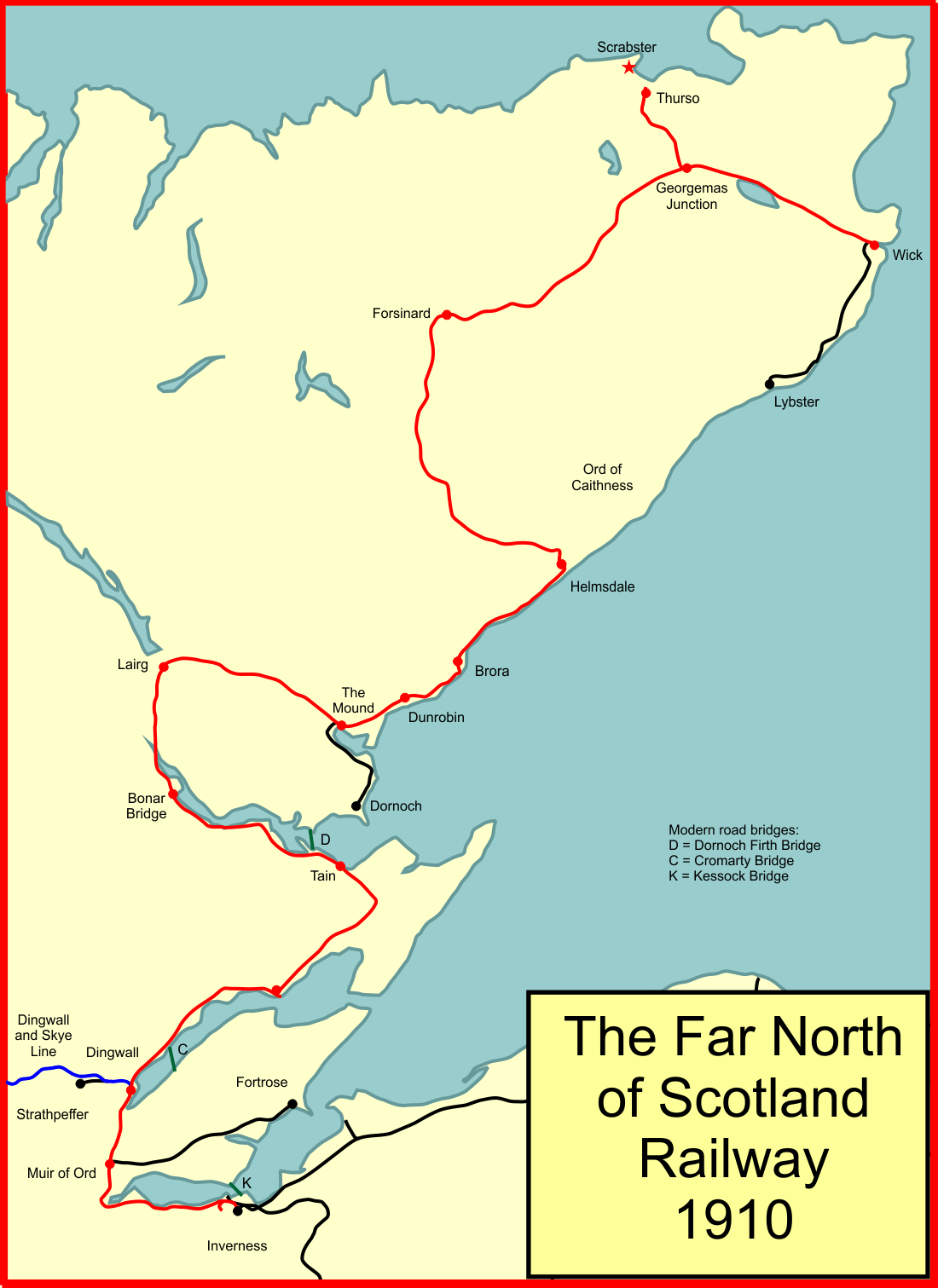
The Far North Railway Line

The first railway reached Inverness in 1855, when the Inverness and Nairn Railway opened its line between Inverness and Nairn. In 1858 Aberdeen was reached, and connected with the developing Scottish railway network. Inverness was linked in to that network, although for the time being by a very roundabout route.

Soon after the opening of the Nairn line, thought was given to how the areas further north might be connected. The geography was not conducive to easy railway building, as the River Ness, the Caledonian Canal, the Beauly Firth and the River Conon lay in the way of northerly progress. Moreover, most of the population lay on the east coast, demanding that any railway attempt that side of the country. Shipping connections to piers and onward transport by connecting railway were considered. The Edinburgh and Northern Railway connected Edinburgh and Dundee and had two ferry crossings in that route, showing that such an arrangement could be commercially successful.

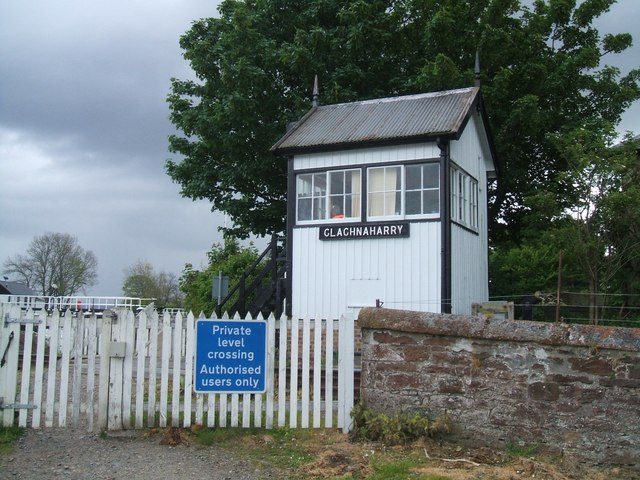
Clachnaharry Signal Box

Such ideas came to nothing, but in 1859 Sir Alexander Matheson of Ardross promoted a railway that would run directly from Inverness to Invergordon. Matheson's tireless work resulted in the Inverness and Ross-shire Railway receiving its authorising act of Parliament, the Inverness and Ross-shire Railway Act 1860 (23 & 24 Vict. c. cxxxi), on 3 July 1860; the capital was to be £21,500, and the Inverness and Nairn Railway and the Inverness and Aberdeen Junction Railway were authorised to subscribe £10,000 and £15,000 respectively. The railway was to be 31 miles (50 km) in length. The construction was pushed forward energetically, with the bridges over the main waterways being quickly completed; the bridge over the Caledonian Canal was a swing bridge with a 40-foot (12 m) opening span; swing bridges were to be provided if required by the authorities over the River Ness and the Dingwall Canal; in the latter case a cash payment and free improvements to a small harbour bought off the requirement. The Beauly River was crossed by a timber bridge at this early stage.

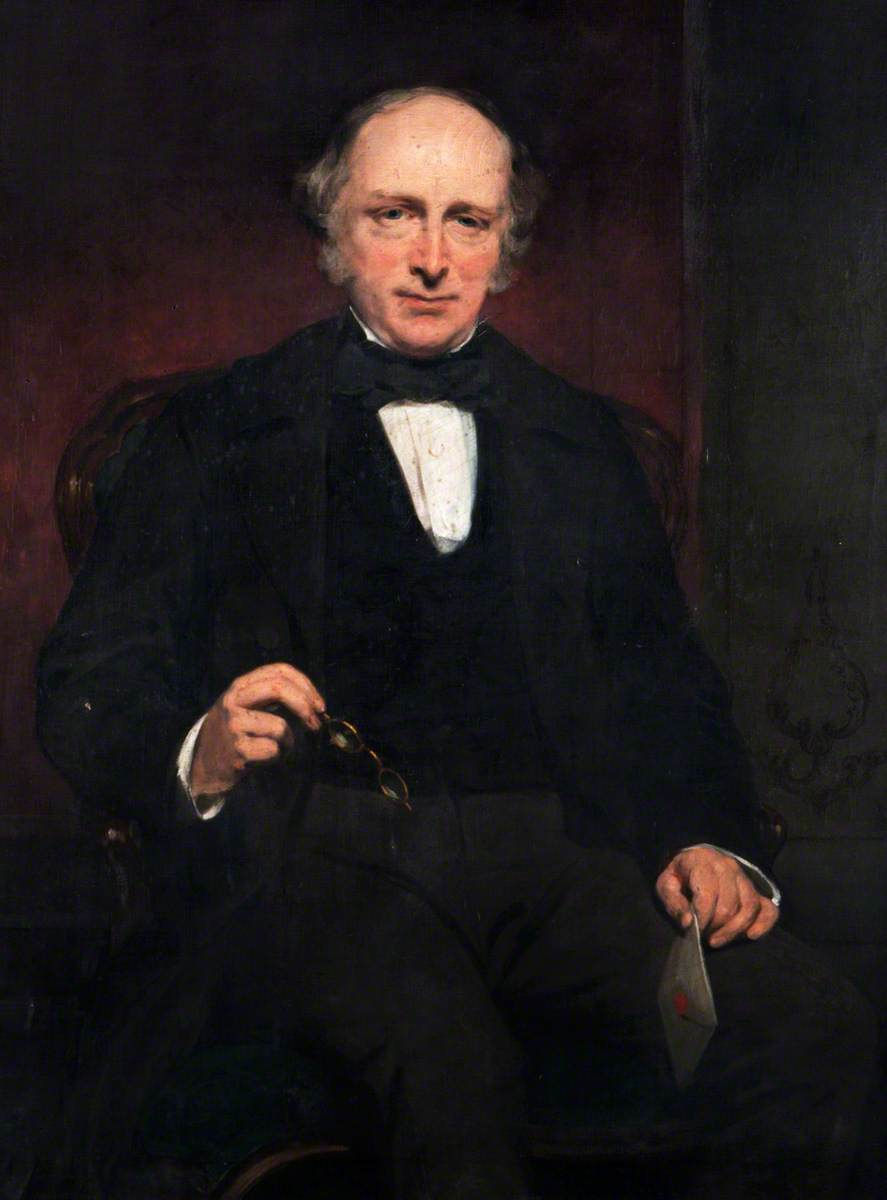
Alexander Matheson

There only remained the easier section north of Dingwall, and opening was anticipated for 1 April 1862, but unforeseen delays resulted in a later opening. Col. Yolland of the Board of Trade inspected the line between Inverness and Dingwall and passed it as fit for passenger operation on 10 June 1862. A wire was sent announcing that the line would open the following day, and a special train was run conveying the senior station staff to their posts in readiness.

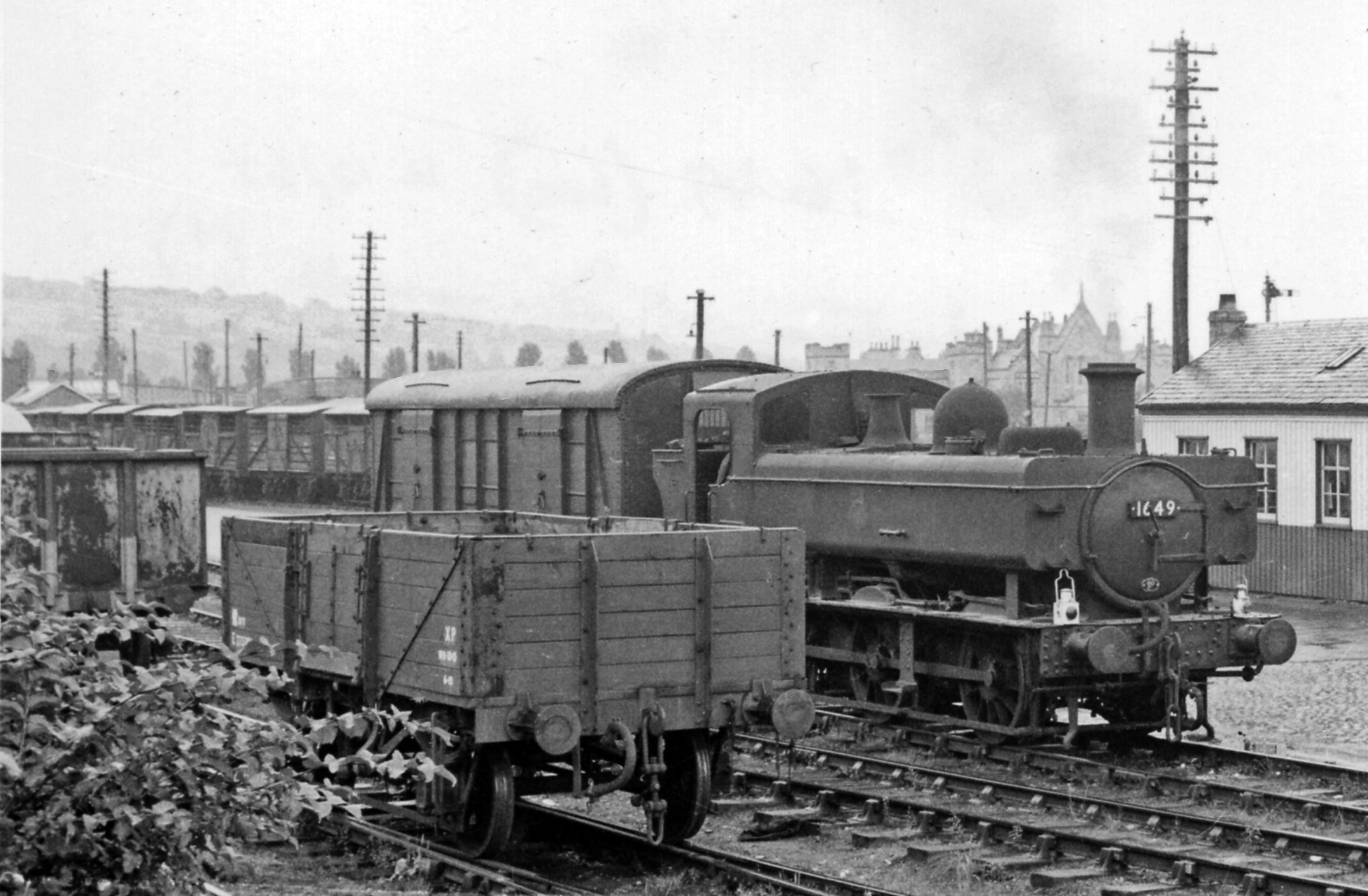
Shunting at Dingwall in steam days

The Inverness station had been built as a terminus for trains arriving from the east, and the frontage faced directly on to Academy Street, making it impossible to convert the station to a through configuration. The Inverness and Ross-shire Railway approached from the west, and curved in to the alignment of the existing station on the immediate approach. The third side of the triangle (later to become known as the Rose Street Curve) was formed by adaptation of the existing Harbour Branch.

In fact most passenger trains arriving from the north line ran past the station and reversed into the eastward-facing (i.e. towards the Perth line) platforms, so facilitating connections for passengers and also promptly releasing the train engine.

== Dingwall to Invergordon ==
The line between Inverness and Dingwall opened to the public on 11 June 1862.

A number of small railway companies east of Inverness, including the Inverness and Nairn, had amalgamated and the Inverness and Aberdeen Junction Railway had been created. The construction north of Dingwall was continuing, and while it did so, the Inverness and Ross-shire Railway was absorbed by the Inverness and Aberdeen Junction Railway, by the Inverness and Aberdeen Junction Railway Act 1862 (25 & 26 Vict. c. cxiii) of 30 June 1862. At this point £83,000 of the authorised £245,000 capital of the Ross-shire company had been paid up.

The line between Dingwall and Invergordon was finally ready, and it too opened, on 25 March 1863. (Note: According to Vallance, Clinker, and Lambert, page 32. Ross says on page 34 23 May 1863; Thomas and Turnock say 25 May 1863 on page 316. Quick says 23 March 1863 (at various station entries.)) The Invergordon station was close to the shore of Cromarty Firth.

== Invergordon to Bonar Bridge ==
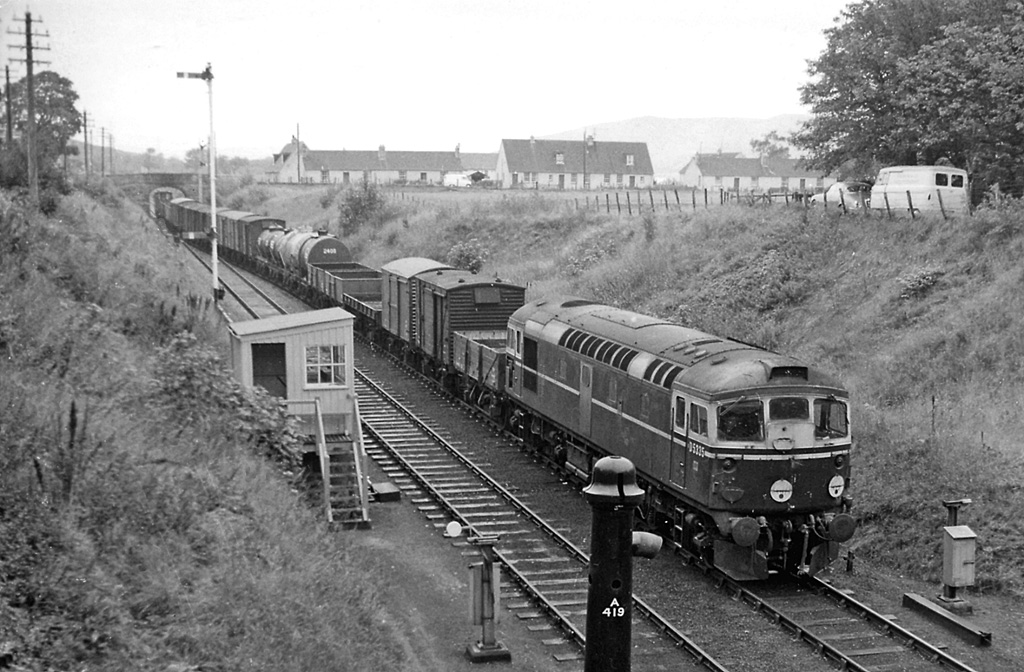
A goods train approaching Bonar Bridge

In the parliamentary session that year, the Inverness and Aberdeen Junction Railway (Bonar Bridge Extension) Act 1863 (26 & 27 Vict. c. xxxii) was passed, on 11 May 1863, authorising extension of the line to Bonar Bridge, a further 26 miles (42 km).

The extension railway was opened to a station called Meikle Ferry, 2 1/2 miles (4 km) beyond Tain, on Dornoch Firth on 1 June 1864. The station closed in 1868 after the line advanced. The station buildings still exist (2015) as 'The Dornoch Bridge Inn' (now closed). The ferry crossing led to a coach connection which was laid on from Meikle Ferry to towns and villages in Sutherland and Caithness but the ferry was nearly 1 mile (1.6 km) into the Dornoch Firth from the station, and journeys north were inconvenient.

The line was opened to Bonar Bridge on 1 October 1864, but this station too was some distance from the place it purported to serve; the station was located on the south side of the Kyle of Sutherland, in a village slightly to the south called Ardgay.

Railway amalgamations were still on the agenda, and the Highland Railway was formed by merging the Inverness and Aberdeen Railway and the Inverness and Perth Junction Railway; the Highland Railway Act 1865 (28 & 29 Vict. c. clxviii) authorising this received royal assent on 29 June 1865.

== The Sutherland Railway ==
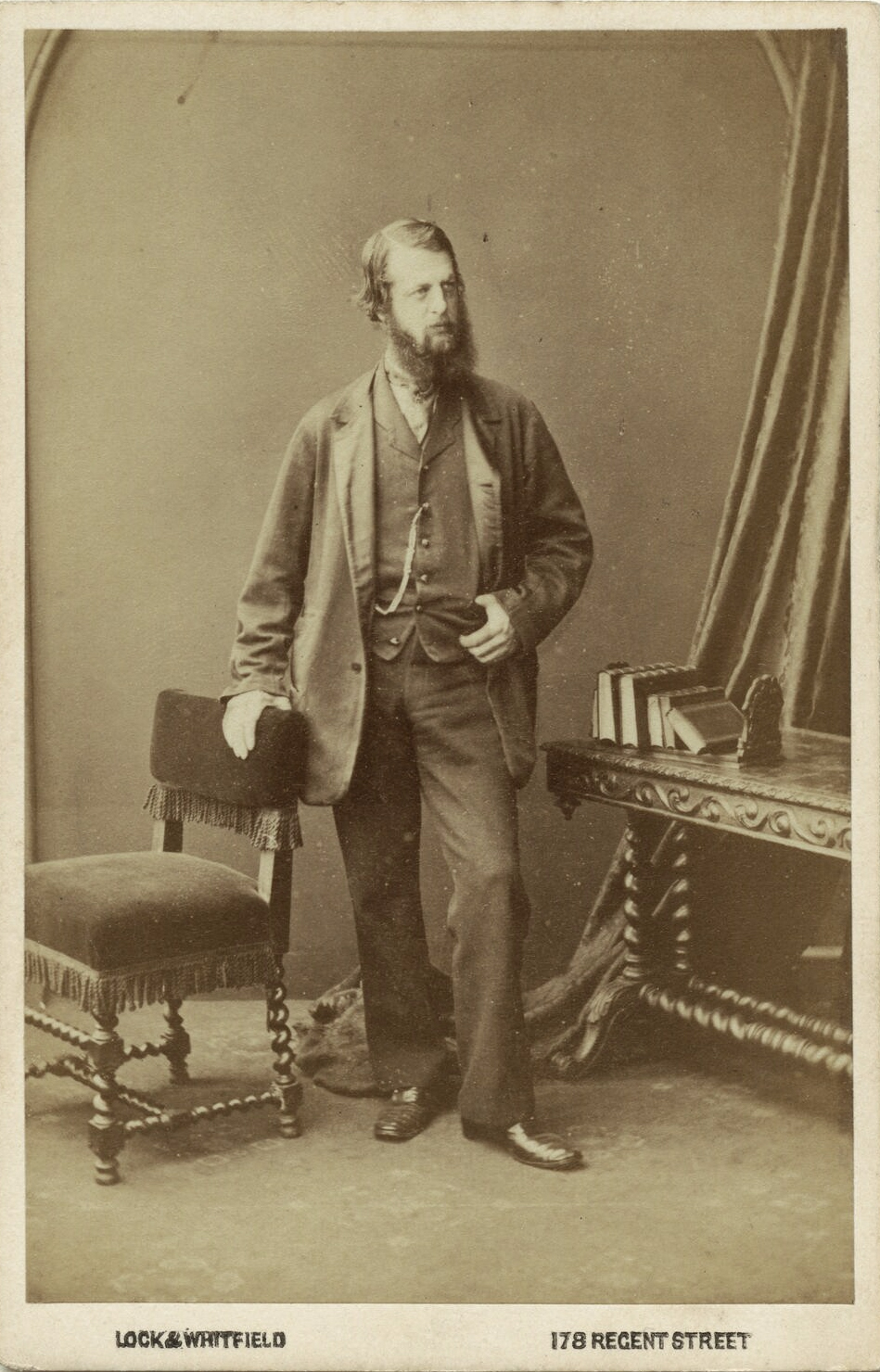
The Third Duke of Sutherland

The next stage of the Far North line was built by the Sutherland Railway, authorised by the Sutherland Railway Act 1865 (28 & 29 Vict. c. clxix), also on 29 June 1865. It continued from Ardgay along the south shore of the Kyle, crossing northwards at Invershin to Lairg (which became the railhead for the north western districts of Northern Scotland), then turning east to Golspie and Brora on the eastern sea coast. The new line was to be nearly 33 miles (53 km) long.

Successive Dukes of Sutherland had taken an interest in improving the districts they owned, and the Third Duke took a great interest in promoting the line. The Highland Railway reluctantly made a contribution of £30,000 to the construction costs of the line, after considerable pressure and manipulation by the Duke. Costs were exceptionally heavy due to the difficult terrain; the issue of the supposedly excessive cost of construction was made into a point of contention by the Duke at the time and subsequently.

Notwithstanding the cash injection, the company only managed to open as far as Golspie, which it did on 13 April 1868; Golspie was 7 miles (11 km) short of the intended terminal point at Brora. The Highland Railway operated the lines, which to outward appearances simply formed a continuous line from Inverness to Golspie.

There was a local gold rush in 1868 when two tributaries of the river near Kildonan were considered to have commercial gold reserves; the frenzy was known as the Sutherland Gold Diggings but they came to almost nothing. There was a repeat, equally unsuccessful, in 1896.

== The Duke of Sutherland's Railway ==
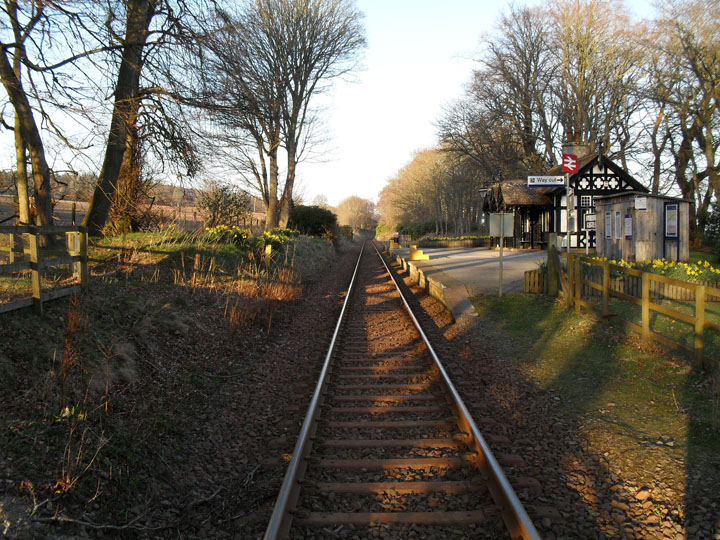
Dunrobin Station

Observing that the railway construction has stopped short — his seat at Dunrobin Castle was 2 miles (3 km) north of Golspie — the Duke of Sutherland obtained legal powers from Parliament to build a line from Golspie to Helmsdale. The Duke of Sutherland's Railway Act 1870 (33 & 34 Vict. c. xxxi) was passed on 20 June 1870, including the transfer of the powers for the section between Golspie and Brora to his new line. As he owned much of the land he was able to start construction in advance of the passage of the act. The railway was entitled the Duke of Sutherland's Railway.

Construction was easy except for short sections at each end of the line, and the central section was ready by the end of 1870. Accordingly, it was opened on 1 November 1870 between Dunrobin and a temporary station called West Helmsdale, less than a mile short of Helmsdale itself. A train service of two trains each way daily operated. As the line was not connected to the Sutherland Railway yet, an engine and rolling stock, hired from the Highland Railway, had to be taken to Dunrobin by road, hauled there by traction engines.

On 19 June 1871 the remaining railway construction was completed and the line was open throughout to Helmsdale; the Highland Railway took over the working of the line. The temporary terminus at Dunrobin became a private station for the Dunrobin estate.

In 1870 the Dingwall and Skye Railway opened the main part of its line, from a junction with the Far North Line at Dingwall to Stromeferry.

== Reaching Caithness ==
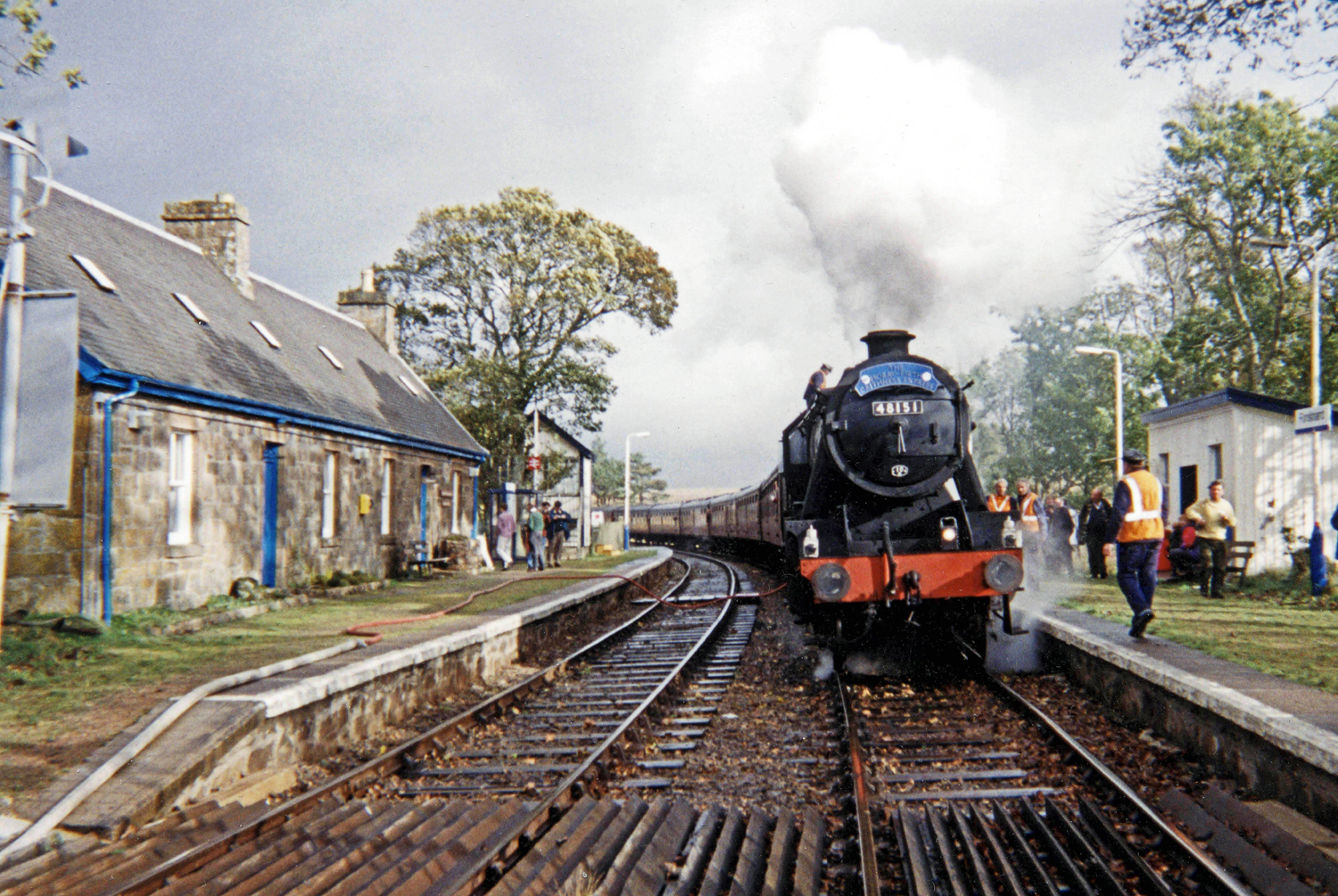
A steam excursion train at Forsinard in 1998

In 1866 the Caithness Railway had been authorised by the Caithness Railway Act 1866 (29 & 30 Vict. c. ccxcii) to build a line joining the towns of Wick and Thurso. The territory southwards from those towns was desolate and mountainous, and there was no intention at the first stage, to connect the line to any other railway, although a line south to Helmsdale was considered, running inland to avoid the most difficult terrain. However the promoters of this line were unable to raise the subscriptions necessary to start construction, amid considerable posturing and offers of funding conditional on other people's contributions, and the idea fell into abeyance.

Inspired by the Duke of Sutherland's efforts in constructing a line to Helmsdale, a new company, the Sutherland and Caithness Railway, was promoted, obtaining its authorising act of Parliament, the Sutherland and Caithness Railway Act 1871 (34 & 35 Vict. c. xcix), on 13 July 1871. It was to adopt the authorised route of the defunct Caithness Railway, and to follow the inland route north from Helmsdale to connect to Wick and Thurso.

This was highly controversial, as the people of Wick expected a direct route over the Ord of Caithness to be followed; this would have been a much shorter route, and it would have made their town the focus of the northern lines. Such a route would have had challenging gradients: 7 miles (11 km) at 1 in 40 among others; one proposal would have had a rope-worked incline. Although serving significant coastal communities it would not have opened up the interior. Nonetheless the Caithness Railway interest continued to press its case, arguing against the increasingly determined view of the Duke of Sutherland that an inland route should be built. The two alternative supporters presented rival bills for the 1871 session of Parliament, but it immediately became evident that the Caithness Railway interest was unable to show the public benefit of the inland route, and the Sutherland and Caithness Railway Act 1871 (34 & 35 Vict. c. xcix) was passed on 13 July 1871; the Caithness Railway was no more.

Share subscriptions from Wick were slow to come forward, (Note: By September 1871 not one share had been subscribed in Wick.) perhaps in revenge for the loss of that town's preferred route, and the Duke of Sutherland made threatening noises about by-passing the town. Eventually the Highland Railway subscribed £50,000 and the Duke of Sutherland £60,000. The line opened on 28 July 1874. Joining end-on to the Duke of Sutherland's Railway, it had a more central station at Helmsdale, and terminal stations both at Wick and Thurso. In neither case was there any attempt to reach the harbours, in the towns or at Scrabster, notwithstanding the great commercial importance of the sea trade.

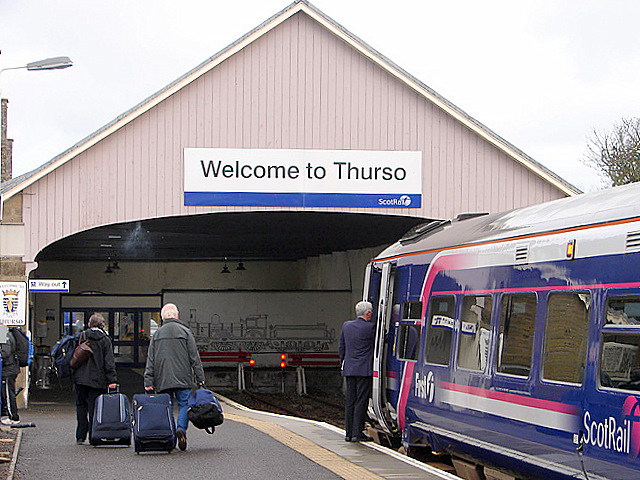
Thurso station

In June 1874 the Duke of Sutherland entertained a visiting party of mining and mechanical engineers at Dunrobin, and then conveyed them in his personal train over the line. They visited the reopened coal mine at Brora and continued to Georgemas. On 9 July 1874 he personally drove his train into Wick station, the rails having just been completed. The Provost and some civic colleagues turned out to meet him, but the encounter was somewhat restrained, Wick's sceptical attitude to the line being still in evidence. Sutherland went on to Thurso, where a crowd of 3,000 persons, two bands, and a banquet awaited him.

A collection had been arranged to make a presentation to him, but the Duke asked that instead the money be turned to the benefit of "those poor fellows who have borne the burden and the heat of the day in pushing on the works as they have done. I refer to the workmen on the line."

Colonel Rich of the Board of Trade inspected the line on 20 July 1874 and passed it as fit for passenger operation, and on 28 July 1874 the first public train left Wick "without even a cheer". The authorised share capital was £360,000 of which £284,254 had actually been issued.

The line between Inverness and Wick and Thurso was now complete; the railways that had formed it continued their independent existence, but the line was worked throughout by the Highland Railway as if it was a single entity.

== Train services ==
The passenger train service from 1871 consisted of four departures from Inverness, the first being the 5:30 am to Golspie, first class and Parliamentary as far as Tain, and then Parliamentary only. At 9:15 am the second train of the day departed, connecting out of the night train from the south. At 3:10 pm the next train left, carrying all three classes and the mails for the north; and at 6:50 pm the final train, mixed, left for Tain.

After the opening north of Helmsdale, there continued to be four trains in the timetable: the 5:20 am to Helmsdale; the 9:40 am to Wick; the 3:10 pm mixed train to Wick; and the 7:25 pm mixed train to Tain. A limited Sunday service ran. There were also two daily trains between Wick and Thurso.

The Highland Railway was technically very backward; W. M. Acworth wrote of the company, in 1890,

It ignores the block system, it will have nothing to do with trans staff or train tablet, but works its traffic... on the old-fashioned system of telegraphic crossing orders; its facing points are often unprovided with locking bars, in some cases they are not even interlocked with the signals. Most of its trains are mixed, some very mixed indeed, and the passenger carriages are always in the rear. (Note: The arrangement made detaching and attaching goods wagons at intermediate stations easy, as the passenger coaches could be left on the main running line; but the passenger coaches at the tail of a long train of loose-coupled goods wagons were subjected to considerable buffeting, and a number of incidents of runaways due to broken couplings were reported in the press.) I came into Inverness not long since from the north in a train of 35 goods trucks followed by seven passenger coaches.

Additional loops were provided from 1902 to expedite traffic on the long single line, and 6 miles (10 km) of double track was installed from Clachnaharry to Clunes in 1913–1914 (the plan had been to double all the way to Dingwall, but this was abandoned on the grounds of cost).

In summer 1906 a train called the "Further North Express" was put on, running on Fridays only. It left Inverness at 4:30 pm connecting out of the 11:50 am from Perth, and without making a passenger call to The Mound in 155 minutes, then continuing to Dornoch on the branch.

In the summer of 1909 there were still only two trains that made the daily run to Wick and Thurso, with an additional Fridays only northbound train. In addition there were four local trains from Inverness to Tain. A Sunday service continued, but when the Post Office withdrew its requirement for Sunday mail trains, the Sunday passenger service was withdrawn.

== Branch lines ==
The long main line of the Far North Line ran through sparsely populated terrain, and the provision of branch lines was of limited commercial value. There was an important main branch, and three local branches, of which two were light railways. (Note: Of course the Far North Line itself had two northern termini. In addition, the Inverness Harbour branch left it immediately west of Inverness; the branch had been built in 1855 by the Inverness and Nairn Railway; in 1877 a short southward branch was built to the Caledonian Canal; it was named the Muirtown branch, and continued in operation until 1969; the short Invergordon harbour branch was opened in 1874 and closed in 1971.) Taking them from south to north, they were as follows.

=== Fortrose Branch ===
The Black Isle lies between Nairn and Invergordon, with relatively moderate salt water crossings of the Moray Forth and Cromarty Firth. The Great North of Scotland attempted to get access to Inverness by a railway crossing the Black Isle, and as a tactical move the Highland Railway promoted a branch line to Fortrose from Muir of Ord. The line opened in 1894, but was never economically significant. Passenger services were withdrawn in 1951 and the line closed completely in 1960.

=== Dingwall and Skye Railway ===
The importance of reaching the West Coast led to the promotion of the Dingwall and Skye Railway. Authorised by the Dingwall and Skye Railway Act 1865 (28 & 29 Vict. c. ccxxiii), the long line was to branch from the Far North Line at Dingwall and run to Kyle of Lochalsh, facing the Isle of Skye across Kyle Akin. The line faced serious money problems and was also excluded from Strathpeffer by the intransigence of a local land owner there. The line opened as far as Stromeferry, on Loch Carron, in 1870. Kyle of Lochalsh was finally reached in 1897, and continues in operation today.

=== Dornoch Light Railway ===
The Light Railways Act 1896 was passed with the intention of encouraging minor local railways that might not be able to finance full scale Parliamentary Bills.

Dornoch had long regretted its isolation from the Far North railway line and saw this opportunity. In 1897 the Dornoch Light Railway was formed, and it opened on 2 June 1902 from a junction at The Mound. The Highland Railway was supportive, but was not inclined to construct the junction free of charge, a stance that caused some resentment locally, as well as straining the finances of the little venture.

It was the first light railway in the Highlands, and it cost £28,000 to construct. The line closed in 1960.

=== Wick and Lybster Light Railway ===
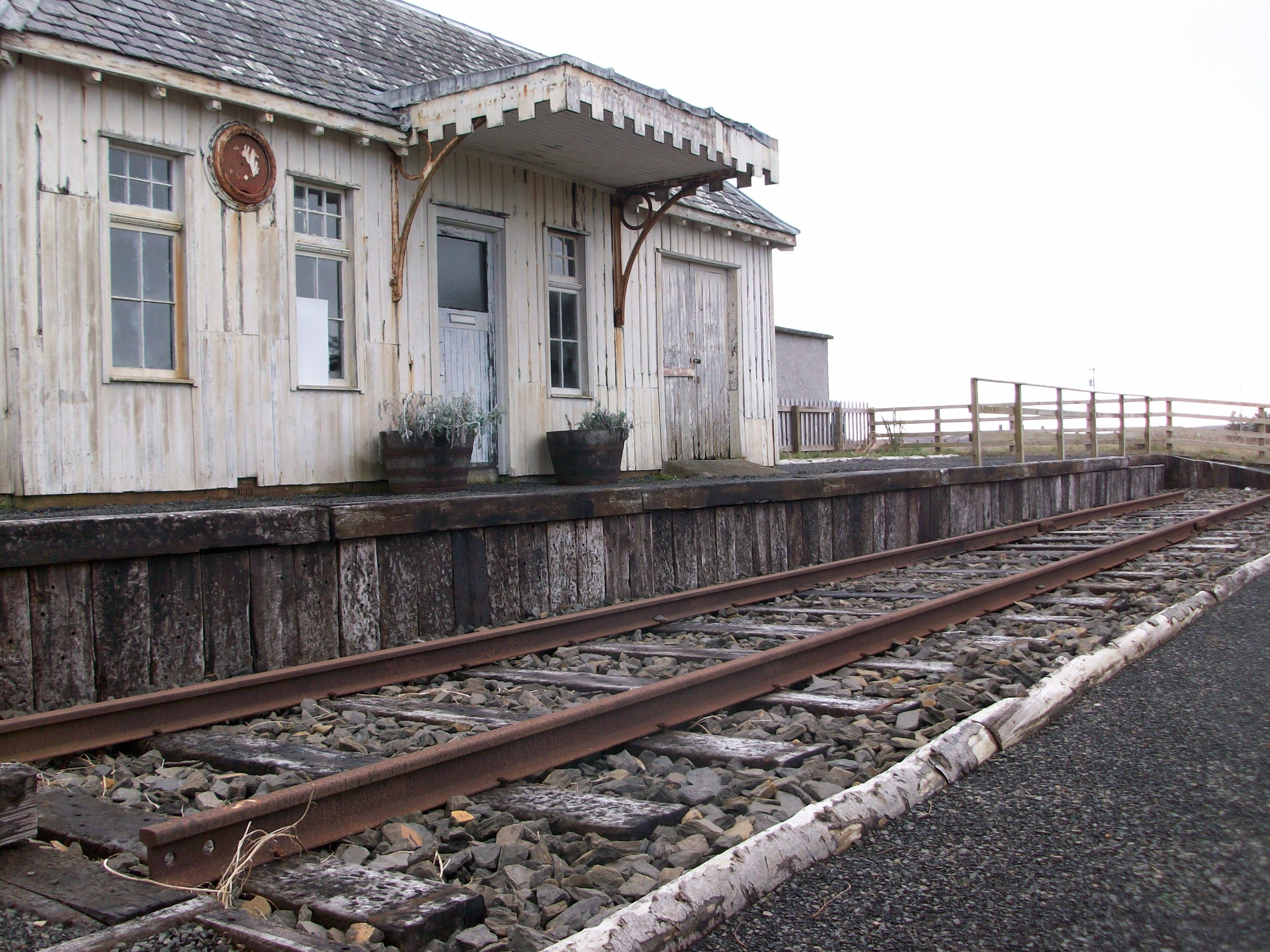
Thrumster station on the Lybster line

The fishing villages on the coast south of Wick regretted the failure of the main line railway to join their towns to the network, and when the Light Railways Act 1896 was passed, they developed plans for a light railway connecting some of them to Wick. The Wick and Lybster Light Railway was formed in 1899; it opened its line in 1903. The line closed in 1944.

== World War I ==
The onset of the First World War on 4 August 1914 signalled a huge upheaval in the traffic of the Far North line. A massive naval base was created at Invergordon, and the Cromarty Firth became a major anchorage. The construction process alone demanded an enormous upsurge in the carriage of materials, and when these bases had added to them Scapa Flow, to be the home of the Grand Fleet, the traffic was overwhelming. As well as construction materials, fleet supplies and the transport of personnel in troop trains and individually, were huge logistical challenges, on a basic single track railway with limited siding accommodation and no direct connection to the small harbours. The locomotive fleet was grossly inadequate for the traffic to be carried.

For some time Dingwall was used as the staging point for materials trains, followed later by Thurso as the Scapa Flow anchorage grew in importance. As the traffic grew unsupportable on the line, Aberdeen came to be used with onward transit to Scapa Flow by sea. The coal for bunkering the Grand Fleet was also supplied by sea, chiefly through the port of Grangemouth—the trains to there were known as "Jellicoes" after the commanding officer of the Grand Fleet, John Jellicoe, 1st Earl Jellicoe but the demand for coal for fuel for the shore bases, and for small out-stationed vessels was carried on the Far North Line and was huge.

At the same time, local resources, especially timber, were required in the south and had to be conveyed. Skilled staff were joining the forces, and signalboxes and locomotives were often unable to be manned due to their absence.

An appeal to the Railway Executive Committee (Note: The Railway Executive Committee was the Government body controlling the railways during the wartime "emergency" and afterwards.) arranged for 19 locomotives to be loaned from other lines to assist (Note: The figure of 19 is net; a larger number of locomotives spent short periods on the line.) but promises to release railway engine fitters from the forces were vain.

From 5 February 1917 a regular daily personnel train ran from Euston (at 6 pm) to Thurso (arriving 3:30 pm the following day), known informally to the sailors as "The Misery".

Ambulance trains had to be run; as well as the many casualties resulting from the Battle of Jutland, a major flow was caused by the influenza epidemic of the spring of 1918 at Invergordon, when 27,000 men were incapacitated.

A Great Western Railway steam railmotor, no 45, was acquired in 1918 to convey workers from munitions depots at Invergordon and Alness to Dingwall.

The Highland Railway was paid by the state the net revenue which was the lesser of that in the first half of 1913 or the first half on 1914, while of course carrying huge volumes of additional traffic.

== Grouping of the Railways ==
After the cessation of hostilities, Government control remained in force for some time, while the Government considered the future structure of the railway. The result was the Railways Act 1921 which "grouped" the many railways of Great Britain into four groups; a Scottish group had been considered, but the idea was abandoned, and the Highland Railway was a constituent of the new London, Midland and Scottish Railway (LMS) from the beginning of 1923. At the grouping, the Far North Line constituted a third of the route mileage of the Highland Railway, and had 42 of the 130 stations.

The LMS had greater resources than its predecessor, and was able to implement some improvements. Refreshment cars were introduced on the Far North trains in 1923, working from Inverness to The Mound or Helmsdale, and in some cases through to Wick.

In the summer of 1923 the "Far North Express" was reinstated, running now from Aviemore and connecting out of the midday train from Perth. It ran non-stop to Dingwall, omitting an Inverness stop.

== The Second World War ==
The onset of World War II in 1939 marked a further period of immense strain on the Far North line; however the greater resources of the LMS enabled better provision of the necessary staffing and equipment, and although the load was heavy, the line coped better than in the previous conflict.

== British Railways ==
The railways were nationalised in 1948 and British Railways created; this time the railways of Scotland were allocated in to their own management structure, the Scottish Region.

The individual character of the locomotive power on the line began to be reduced, and more powerful locomotive types appeared. From 1958 diesel locomotives began to be used on the line.

Many of the numerous passenger stations on the line were inconveniently located and served small communities, while the steady improvements to main roads since the 1930s reduced public dependency on the railway. On 13 June 1960 a large number of passenger stations were closed between Inverness and Bonar Bridge, where bus competition was greatest; beyond that point the road network is not so well developed and most of the stations remained in use. The closures saved a substantial element of journey time: 25 to 41 minutes, as well as £41,000 annually in costs. (Rogart station was re-opened nine months later.) In general the crossing loops at the closed stations were retained, so that operational convenience was not prejudiced.

In 1981 the aluminium smelting plant at Invergordon was closed, chiefly due to difficulty in obtaining electric power at an economic price. This was a major blow to the employment in the area, and to freight carrying on the line.

The major upgrading of the road network, and in particular the construction of the Kessock Bridge at Inverness (opened 1982), the Cromarty Bridge (opened 1979), and the Dornoch Firth Bridge (opened 1991), which vastly shortened the road transit north from Inverness, have seriously weakened the remaining competitiveness of the railway.

There were a small number of station reopenings in the late 20th and early 21st centuries, at Alness (1973), Muir of Ord (1976), Beauly (2002) and Conon Bridge (2013), mostly in response to housing development and to enable commuting into Inverness. At the request of the Highland Regional Council, the name of Bonar Bridge station was changed to Ardgay in 1977.

Following the widespread loss of traditional lineside telegraph wires in blizzard conditions in January 1978, the decision was taken to replace the communication between signal boxes with radio transmissions. At first this retained traditional signalbox control, with only the communication between them being changed. In 1985 a novel system of train control was introduced, known as Radio Electronic Token Block (RETB). In this system the "token" traditionally required to be in the possession of the driver of a train on a single line, is made available as a display on apparatus in the driving cab. Most signals on the route were removed and points were spring-operated. The control centre for the system was at Dingwall; it enabled a very considerable saving in staff costs.

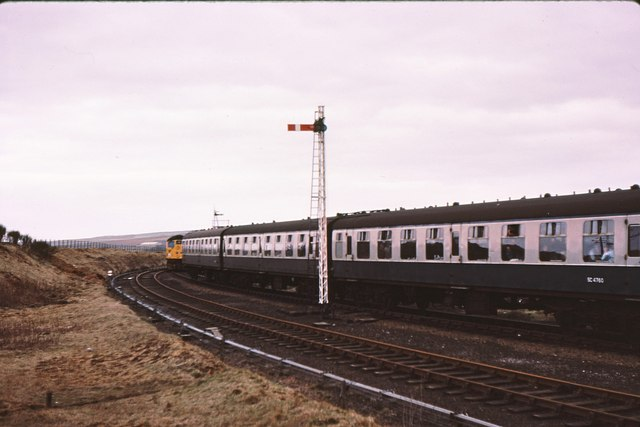
Separating the Thurso portion at Georgemas Junction

From the introduction of diesel traction on the line in the early 1960s, Class 26 locomotives were used, followed later by Class 37 locomotives. A writer in 1961 said that "At present, diesel traction is used only for goods trains, and the Sunday morning newspaper train from Inverness to Lairg, which returns as a passenger train." The general pattern of passenger operation was three trains daily, dividing (northbound) at Georgemas Junction, with one portion going to Thurso and one to Wick. Incidentally this rendered the passenger facility between the two terminals impracticable.

Passenger operation was changed to multiple unit trains in the 1990s, using Class 156 sets at first, and later Class 158s. The service pattern was altered so that trains to Wick ran from Georgemas to Thurso and back to Wick, saving operating costs.

== Brora Colliery Tramway ==
Coal had been mined on a small scale at Brora since the sixteenth century, and from the 1770s the mine had been linked with the harbour by a wooden tramway with a gauge of 20 inches (510 mm), using horse traction. In the early 1800s the line was ready with cast iron fish-bellied rails. This business failed, but in 1810 a new shaft was sunk and a new tramway laid, and a brick and tile works was established in connection with the works. Coal was needed to fire the clay to make bricks. The tramway network had lines both north and south of the River Brora, and when the Duke of Sutherland's Railway was opened, it crossed over the Brora lines.

The brick works closed by 1890, although sporadic production of coal and bricks continued until 1947.

Horse traction was used on the line throughout its existence, except that an 0-4-0 tank engine named Florence was produced by the Leeds locomotive builder Manning Wardle in 1871, Works Number 579. This was in use until 1891. A badly designed 0-6-2 locomotive named Little Giant was acquired in 1914; it had 8-inch (200 mm) diameter driving wheels and was mechanically useless.

A considerable network of the original line remained in use at the coal mine in 1960, and about 50 wagons were in use there.

== The present day ==
Today, the Far North Line's future is secure as a key lifeline service connecting Inverness with Easter Ross commuter towns, Sutherland coastal villages, the towns of Caithness, and the latter county's ferry ports. Many passengers travel from Inverness to Thurso and head to Scrabster, where NorthLink Ferries' MV Hamnavoe awaits for their onward journey to Orkney.

The passenger train service is operated by ScotRail, and consists of four trains each weekday running throughout between Inverness and Wick, with three additional short workings to Invergordon, Ardgay or Tain; there is an additional late train to Tain on Friday and Saturday evenings. There is one throughout service on Sundays with additional short workings to Tain.

Going north the Wick trains run from Georgemas Junction to Thurso and back to the junction, then continuing to Wick. The throughout journey time from Inverness is about 4 hours 30 minutes.

The Stagecoach-run coach service, the X99, reaches Wick faster than the rail service does; however, the X99, which runs from Inverness to Tain, Dornoch, Golspie, Brora, Helmsdale, Dunbeath, Lybster, Wick, Castletown, Thurso and Scrabster, is less frequent than the train - which provides a competitive journey time to Thurso - and traverses the treacherous Berriedale Braes as well as now being routed via the A99 south of Wick, one of the few roads in Britain to have been rated 'Black' by EuroRAP indicating a high risk of serious or fatal misadventure for those who drive along it. As well as this, the coaches used on the X99 route have been criticised by passengers in recent years, while custom on the Far North Line's major stations, Wick excepted, has increased across the last few years after some past reliability issues.

A campaigning group, the Friend of the Far North Line (FoFNL), advocates for enhanced services along the line. This campaigning has helped to establish the 'Invernet' commuter services from Inverness to the Easter Ross towns (the short workings mentioned above), while the work of the FoFNL has also helped to build new stations at Beauly and Conon Bridge. Nowadays, the FoFNL advocates chiefly for improved infrastructure; a key aspiration is the implementation of a dynamic passing loop between Clachnaharry and Lentran (the Lentran Long Loop), which would improve reliability of end-to-end services and allow for a potential hourly service between Inverness and Tain, with services to Thurso and Wick able to skip southern stops in order to save time. Another ambition is to upgrade level crossings en route in order to increase linespeeds and therefore speed up services.

Local councillors and residents have been campaigning for the closed station at Evanton to be reopened, while the FoFNL has also expressed a desire to see the station at Halkirk opened again alongside a passing loop and a new north-west 'chord' that would allow trains to run to and from Thurso without having to reverse at Georgemas Junction. A local service between Thurso and Wick using a VivaRail D-train unit stationed at Wick has also been suggested. A passing loop and second platform at Kinbrace have been advocated as well as a siding there to aid timber extraction from the Flow Country by rail; this measure would also improve reliability. A distant aspiration is to open an extension from Thurso to Scrabster, while the mythical Dornoch Rail Link, supported by the Dornoch Rail Link Action Group (DORLAG), would connect the line to Sutherland's county town while removing an estimated 40 minutes from journey times between Tain and Golspie.

The request stops at Culrain, Invershin, Kildonan, Altnabreac and Scotscalder are particularly poorly-used due to their remote situations; however, trains must slow down while passing through them in case passengers wish to board. At Kildonan, often the line's least-used station when annual usage statistics are released, there have been plans to trial an advance request-stop system where passengers at the platform press a button to communicate their desire to board the train rather than hail it as it arrives; this mechanism could allow services along the extent of the line to save time.

== Topography ==
- Thurso; opened 28 July 1874;
- Hoy; opened 1 October 1874; closed 29 November 1965;
- Georgemas Junction; below; opened 28 July 1874 and originally named Georgemas;
- Wick; opened 28 July 1874;
- Bilbster; opened 28 July 1874; closed 13 June 1960;
- Watten; opened 28 July 1874; closed 13 June 1960;
- Bower; opened 28 July 1874; closed 13 June 1960;
- Georgemas Junction; above;
- Halkirk; opened 28 July 1874; closed 13 June 1960;
- Scotscalder; opened 28 July 1874;
- Altnabreac; opened 28 July 1874;
- Forsinard; opened 28 July 1874;
- Kinbrace; opened 28 July 1874;
- Borobol Platform; opened from September 1876; no platforms provided until 1880; closed 29 November 1965;
- Kildonan; opened 28 July 1874;
- Salzcraggie Platform; opened 28 July 1874 for private shooting estate, but not shown in public timetable until July 1907; closed 29 November 1965;
- Helmsdale; opened 16 May 1871;
- West Helmsdale; opened 1 November 1870; closed 19 June 1871;
- Loth; opened 1 November 1870; closed 13 June 1960;
- Brora; opened 1 November 1870;
- Dunrobin; opened 1 November 1870; became private station 19 June 1871; reverted to public status in later years; closed 29 November 1965; reopened for summer services 30 June 1985 but not advertised until 1991; named Dunrobin Castle in later years;
- Golspie; opened 13 April 1868;
- The Mound; trailing junction for Dornoch Branch; opened 13 April 1868; closed 13 June 1960;
- Rogart; opened 13 April 1868; closed 13 June 1960; reopened 6 March 1961;
- Lairg; opened 13 April 1868;
- Invershin; opened 13 April 1868;
- Culrain; opened 1 July 1870;
- Bonar Bridge; opened 1 October 1864; renamed Ardgay 1977;
- Mid Fearn; opened 1 October 1864; closed 31 March 1865; in 1920s again used, named Mid Fearn Platform by railwaymen and school children;
- Edderton; opened 1 October 1864; closed 13 June 1960;
- Meikle Ferry; opened 1 June 1864; closed 1 January 1869;
- Tain; opened 1 June 1864;
- Fearn; opened 1 June 1864;
- Nigg; opened 1 June 1864; closed 13 June 1960;
- Parkhill; opened 1 June 1864; renamed Kildary 1868; closed 13 June 1960;
- Delny; opened 1 June 1864; originally spelt Delney; closed 13 June 1960;
- Invergordon; opened 23 March 1863; harbour branch trails in;
- Alness; opened 23 March 1863; closed 13 June 1960; reopened 7 May 1973;
- Novar; opened 23 March 1863; renamed Evanton 1937; closed 13 June 1960;
- Fowlis; opened 23 March 1863; renamed Foulis 1916; closed 13 June 1960;
- Dingwall; opened 11 June 1862;
- Conon; opened 11 June 1862; closed 1 June 1960; re-opened as Conon Bridge 2013;
- Muir of Ord; opened 11 June 1862; closed 15 June 1960; re-opened 4 October 1976;
- Beauly; opened 11 June 1862; closed 13 June 1960; re-opened 2002;
- Clunes; opened by October 1863; closed 1 June 1960;
- Lentran; opened 11 June 1862; closed 13 June 1960; reopened 27 to 29 March 1982 as temporary terminus during work on Clachnaharry Swing Bridge;
- Bunchrew; opened 11 June 1862; closed 13 June 1960;
- Clachnaharry; opened 1 April 1868; closed 1 Apr 1913;
- Inverness; main line station.

Invershin and Culrain stations were less than 1/2 mile (800 m) apart, but the road journey was over 6 miles (10 km), and for a halfpenny the journey by train might be made (until the fares increase of 1917).

The line has two significant summits; County March, at the Sutherland/Caithness boundary between Forsinard and Altnabreac, 216 metres (708 ft) above sea level; and Lairg summit, between Lairg and Rogart, 149 metres (488 ft) above sea level.

== See also ==
- Far North Line
