= Achnasheen =

Coordinates: 57.58092°N 5.07075°W

Achnasheen: Scottish Gaelic: Achadh na Sìne
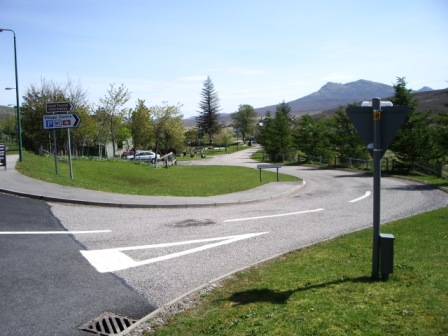
- Achnasheen

- Location within the Highland council area
- OS grid reference: NH165586
- Civil parish: Contin
- Council area: Highland
- Lieutenancy area: Ross and Cromarty
- Country: Scotland
- Sovereign state: United Kingdom
- Post town: ACHNASHEEN
- Postcode district: IV22
- Dialling code: 01445
- Police: Scotland
- Fire: Scottish
- Ambulance: Scottish
- UK Parliament: Caithness, Sutherland and Easter Ross
- Scottish Parliament: Caithness, Sutherland and Ross

Achnasheen (Gaelic Achadh na Sìne) is a small village in Ross-shire in the Highland council area of Scotland.

The village is situated on the River Bran at the junction of two roads built by Thomas Telford, the A832 and the A890.

Despite the size of the village, Achnasheen is also the name of a postal district which covers several much larger communities including Kinlochewe, Poolewe and Laide. This dates from the time when the village railway station, built in 1870, was an important stop on the Dingwall and Skye Line of the Highland Railway (now part of the Kyle of Lochalsh Line), serving a large area of Wester Ross. The railway still operates but all freight and mail, and most passengers, now travel by road. In 1893, a scheme was considered to build a railway from Achnasheen to Aultbea, but it was soon dropped. At the same time as the railway being built, the Achnasheen Hotel, located right next to the eastbound platform of the station, was also built. The hotel burnt down in the early 1990s and has never been rebuilt.

Between 1961 and 1991, the village was the location of a Royal Observer Corps monitoring bunker, to be used in the event of a nuclear attack. It remains mostly intact.

== Facilities ==
Facilities in the village are limited. The Ledgowan Lodge Hotel is one mile (1.5 kilometres) west of the village.

There are a couple of small cafes in the community. There is also a regular train service, with the station in the centre of the community. At the train station car park there is an electric car charging point.

There used to be a school in Achnasheen, but the last pupil attended in 2004. By 2010, with no children in the area, the school was formally mothballed. Children in the former Achnasheen catchment area, until 2022, attended Kinlochewe school. But, when the school roll at Kinlochewe fell to one, children from both the Achnasheen and Kinlochewe area now attend Gairloch Primary. The secondary school catchment is also at Gairloch High School.

Within the village hall, the post office service has a weekly service to the community.

== Cultural references ==
Symphonic power metal band Gloryhammer mentioned the 'valley of Achnasheen' and the 'seas of Achnasheen' in their 2019 songs "The Land of Unicorns" and "Hootsforce" respectively.
