= Aultbea =

Coordinates: 57.840°N 5.586°W

Aultbea: Scottish Gaelic: An t-Allt Beithe
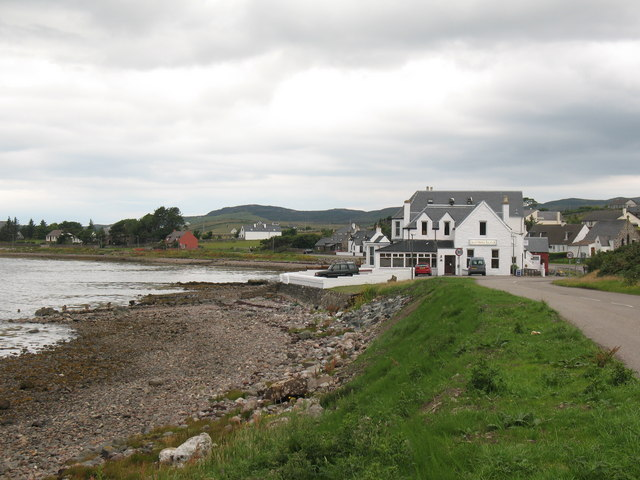
- The Aultbea Hotel on the foreshore

- Location within the Highland council area
- Population: 370
- OS grid reference: NG872890
- Civil parish: Gairloch
- Council area: Highland
- Country: Scotland
- Sovereign state: United Kingdom
- Post town: ACHNASHEEN
- Postcode district: IV22
- Dialling code: 01445
- Police: Scotland
- Fire: Scottish
- Ambulance: Scottish
- UK Parliament: Caithness, Sutherland and Easter Ross
- Scottish Parliament: Caithness, Sutherland and Ross

Aultbea (Gaelic: An t-Allt Beithe) is a small coastal fishing village in the North-West Highlands of Scotland. It is situated on the southeast shore of Loch Ewe, about 30 kilometres (19 mi) west of Ullapool. The village has a primary school and a small post office.

Aultbea has two churches, a shop, a masonic lodge and a Café & Gift Shop, Oran Na Mara, located just below the Drumchork Hotel. As of 2021, a third small church was under construction. Aultbea has a NATO refuelling base which serves large ships. There is an annual "fun day" when people from the village and surrounding area play football or other activities, or socialise over home-baked scones.

The village has two hotels. The Aultbea Hotel and the former Drumchork Lodge Hotel, where the Loch Ewe Distillery was located until its closure in 2017. The Drumchork hotel closed in 2021. However, the Aultbea Hotel re-opened under new management in 2022.

The nearest airport is in Stornoway, although that is located on the Isle of Lewis and thus not convenient for onward travel to Aultbea. The closest mainland airport is located near Inverness, which is about 83 miles away. The nearest railway station is at Achnasheen, which has trains either to Inverness or westwards through the scenic village Plockton to Kyle of Lochalsh. There is also a ferry service to the Isle of Lewis in the relatively nearby town of Ullapool. This service was once proposed to be based in Aultbea but due to Aultbea's remote setting, Ullapool was granted the ferry port. In 1893, a rail track to Aultbea was planned but again the decision went against the village as demand for such a service was expected to be low.

== Sport ==
Together with the nearby village of Gairloch, Aultbea has an amateur football team – Gairloch Aultbea United or GA United. Most of the local population support Scottish Premier League side Ross County F.C., based in Dingwall, 70 miles (110 km) away, as this is the closest league team to the Aultbea area.

== Attractions ==
Aultbea offers sandy beaches as well as rocky shores, all of which look out at the Isle of Ewe. Scattered around the area are the remains of World War II buildings and barracks. Next to the local football pitch is a display board, which describes the role of the buildings in detail. Aultbea has views out to Cove and the Isle of Lewis, as well as the nearby Torridon Hills.

== Geography and climate ==
The coast is affected by the North Atlantic Drift, bringing relatively warm waters. These are ideal for jellyfish, which can swarm the local waters, as well as visiting dolphins. The Northern Lights are visible on occasion depending on the weather and time of year, around the equinox being best. The record lowest temperature is amongst the highest in the UK. The lowest temperature was recorded on 17 December 2010. On 22 February 2019, Aultbea recorded its warmest February day on record, with 16.5 °C. As of 19:11 GMT on 22 February it was the warmest place in the UK with 16.2 °C. This was then beaten the next day, with a temperature of 16.8 °C.

Climate data for Aultbea 11m amsl (1991-2020 averages)
Month	Jan	Feb	Mar	Apr	May	Jun	Jul	Aug	Sep	Oct	Nov	Dec	Year
Record high °C (°F)	16.5 (61.7)	16.8 (62.2)	19.0 (66.2)	24.5 (76.1)	26.6 (79.9)	27.6 (81.7)	28.7 (83.7)	28.3 (82.9)	26.7 (80.1)	21.4 (70.5)	19.5 (67.1)	16.6 (61.9)	28.7 (83.7)
Mean daily maximum °C (°F)	7.8 (46.0)	7.9 (46.2)	9.0 (48.2)	11.3 (52.3)	13.9 (57.0)	15.7 (60.3)	17.3 (63.1)	17.2 (63.0)	15.6 (60.1)	12.7 (54.9)	10.0 (50.0)	8.2 (46.8)	12.2 (54.0)
Daily mean °C (°F)	5.4 (41.7)	5.3 (41.5)	6.3 (43.3)	8.1 (46.6)	10.3 (50.5)	12.6 (54.7)	14.3 (57.7)	14.3 (57.7)	12.7 (54.9)	10.1 (50.2)	7.5 (45.5)	5.7 (42.3)	9.4 (48.9)
Mean daily minimum °C (°F)	2.9 (37.2)	2.7 (36.9)	3.6 (38.5)	4.9 (40.8)	6.8 (44.2)	9.4 (48.9)	11.4 (52.5)	11.4 (52.5)	9.9 (49.8)	7.5 (45.5)	5.0 (41.0)	3.2 (37.8)	6.6 (43.9)
Record low °C (°F)	−5.5 (22.1)	−6.1 (21.0)	−7.4 (18.7)	−3.7 (25.3)	−1.5 (29.3)	1.5 (34.7)	4.1 (39.4)	3.9 (39.0)	0.6 (33.1)	−1.8 (28.8)	−7.6 (18.3)	−8.5 (16.7)	−8.5 (16.7)
Average precipitation mm (inches)	169.2 (6.66)	132.4 (5.21)	118.0 (4.65)	77.6 (3.06)	81.6 (3.21)	75.2 (2.96)	77.8 (3.06)	96.5 (3.80)	123.6 (4.87)	162.1 (6.38)	164.7 (6.48)	169.3 (6.67)	1,448 (57.01)
Average precipitation days (≥ 1.0 mm)	20.6	18.0	18.3	14.5	13.9	14.2	14.7	16.1	17.2	20.3	20.3	20.8	208.9
Source 1: Met Office
Source 2: Starlings Roost Weather

== Places to go ==
Loch Ewe Distillery in Drumchork was the smallest licensed distillery of Scotland but has been closed for some years. There are many fishing hotspots in nearby rivers and lochs, and many walks into the hills and the nearby Laide Wood.

The Arctic Convoy Museum commemorates the Arctic convoys of World War II.
