= Culrain =

Coordinates: 57°55′09″N 04°24′23″W

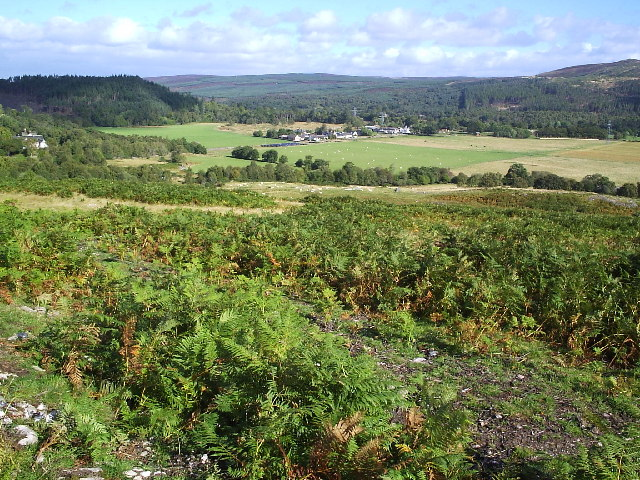
- Culrain

- Location within the Sutherland area
- Population: 90 (2001)
- OS grid reference: NH5794
- Council area: Highland
- Country: Scotland
- Sovereign state: United Kingdom
- Post town: ARDGAY
- Postcode district: IV24
- Police: Scotland
- Fire: Scottish
- Ambulance: Scottish

Culrain (Cul Raoin) is a small village in Sutherland, Highland, Scotland. In 1650, the Battle of Carbisdale took place just outside the village.

== Location ==
Culrain lies west of Ardgay, beside the Kyle of Sutherland about 5 mi (8 km) west from the village of Bonar Bridge, where several rivers converge to flood into the sea through lush water meadows.

It lies within the civil parish of Kincardine and Community council of Ardgay and District.

== History ==
James Graham, 1st Marquess of Montrose was defeated here at the Battle of Carbisdale, in 1650 in what proved to be the beginning of his end. Although Carbisdale is the name of the nearest farm to the site of the battle, Culrain is the nearest village.

The Munro of Culrain family held the estate of Culrain in the 17th-century and it was apparently named after Coleraine in Ireland which the family's progenitor, George Munro, 1st of Newmore, had been governor during the Irish Confederate Wars. The estate later passed from the Munro of Culrain family to the Munro of Novar family.

Hugh Andrew Johnstone Munro of Novar devoted himself more to art than to politics at a time when the Highland Clearances were a live issue and he evicted tenants from his estate of Culrain. The initial evictions were entrusted to three men: James Stewart who was a sheriff-officer along with William Munro and Andrew Tallach from the nearby township of Morangie. At the point of eviction in Culrain on 1 February 1820, Stewart was confronted by a crowd of 150 women who demanded that he hand over his papers, which he refused, but they took them off him anyway and they included 57 "notices of removal". When William Munro and Andrew Tallach appeared, they were both forcibly detained by the women who were armed with "sticks and batons" according to Stewart. One of the women was punched by William Munro and fell on her back. William Munro then ran off being pelted with stones and Stewart and Andrew Tallach were then driven out of Culrain by the mob in a "mock triumph". Munro of Novar later arranged for a larger group of militia men which amounted to 100 strong and included armed ex-soldiers to enforce the removals. This group was also pelted with hand-size stones by the women on 2 March 1820 and failed to complete its objective. However, during this second incident, one of the women was supposedly shot dead and another was badly wounded through the eye and mouth with a bayonet. Munro of Novar later came to an agreement in which while Culrain would still be turned into a sheep farm, his tenants would not be evicted. However, this arrangement did not endure indefinitely and later in 1820 he cleared 500–600 people from his estate in Culrain to make way for sheep.

For a number of years Culrain was also the home of the Scottish sculptor Ann Henderson (RSA).

== Surrounding area ==
Overlooking the Kyle of Sutherland is the early 20th-century Carbisdale Castle. This was home to the exiled King of Norway during the German occupation of Norway during World War II.

== Travel ==
Trains between Inverness and Thurso stop at Ardgay railway station and Culrain railway station (a request stop). The youth hostel is closed.

Buses between Inverness and Lairg stop in Ardgay and Bonar Bridge.

In the 1890s, a branch railway to Lochinver was proposed, but was never developed any further.
