= Winston Pinder =

Civil rights activist

- Education: Social science degree from Ruskin College
- Organization: Camden Community Race Relations Council
- Known for: Anti-racicm activism, Marxism
- Political party: Communist Party of Great Britain (1950s to 1991)
- Awards: Charles Howard bursary. Tony Cheeseman Foundation community award.

Winston Pinder was a black civil rights activist, communist, and youth worker, most notable for his work alongside Billy Strachan, Claudia Jones, and his campaigns against racism in Britain. Originally from Barbados, Pinder has spent most of his life has been spent in the United Kingdom, involved in various political campaigns, trade union activities, and left-wing activism.

His most notable campaigns involved the creation of Paul Robeson House in London, Kentish Town Youth Club, and raising money for the creation of Claudia Jones's grave, which is situated next to that of Karl Marx in Highgate Cemetery.

Winston Pinder died on 15 May 2026.

== Early life ==
Born in Barbados, Winston Pinder left school to work for a telephone company after receiving the Charles Howard bursary to fund his work training. He was then sent to British Guiana, where he worked on the building of the Demerara telephone exchange, financed by the Bookers company. During his time in British Guiana, Pinder became interested in anti-colonial and trade union movements active throughout the Caribbean.

In 1954, he spent several months in Barbados, before travelling to the United Kingdom that same year as a part of the Windrush generation.

== Arrival in Britain ==
Arriving in Britain in 1954, Pinder moved to Islington, London, where he worked as a post-office engineer at the Temple Bar exchange. Soon after arriving in Britain, Pinder became a member of the Communist Party of Great Britain (CPGB) and joined the CPGB's Caribbean committee.

In December 1955, Pinder made history as being a part of a small contingent of communist activists that welcomed Claudia Jones to Britain at Victoria station. Soon afterwards, Jones would go onto become one of the most influential civil rights leaders in the history of the United Kingdom. In later life, Pinder would work alongside Jones politically, particularly in the aftermath of the Notting Hill race riots. Later in life, Pinder regarded Jones as his political mentor.

Later, he moved to Camden, London. During the 1958 Notting Hill race riots, Pinder was chased by racist Teddy Boys armed with chains on Kentish Town Road, but managed to outrun them. Later in life, Pinder was not so lucky, and had to have his spleen removed after being stabbed in the stomach during a fight in the Tally Ho pub on Fortess Road.

== Youth work ==
Tension and fear began to permeate the black communities in Britain following the Notting Hill race riots, inspiring Pinder to become even more active within London's black communities, especially the black youth. Noticing how the only two youth groups in his local area did not welcome black children, Pinder began a career as a youth worker, reaching out to young people in London and sharing his family home on Kentish Town Road, where he lived with his wife and four young children, as an informal drop-in center. Commenting on this situation, Pinder said that: "When I arrived in the area, there were only two youth clubs and it was made clear that black kids were not welcome in them..." He began renting areas to conduct youth work, first the basement of an empty fire station, then later a church hall.

Inspired by his experiences during his youth work, Pinder completed a social science degree at Ruskin College before joining the Camden Community Race Relations Council. When this organisation moved out of its premises on Gray's Inn Road, Pinder was offered to use two rooms in the property for a drop-in centre. This led to the creation of the Camden Afro Caribbean Organisation, which Pinder chaired for many years. One of the issues that Pinder found most pressing for young black youth were the sus laws, which gave police the power to stop and search whomever they pleased, a power which the police often abused to harass black people. A familiar site around Camden's streets, Pinder was often seen wearing a cap similar to that worn by Vladimir Lenin.

=== Kentish Town Youth Club ===
After Pinder launched a campaign which lasted several years to found a local youth club, the two story purpose built Kentish Town Youth Club was opened in 1971 on London's Hadley Street. Pinder's campaign had been run with the support of Alderman Ruth Howe, the chair of the Camden Committee for Community Relations (CCCR). This youth club was notable for being the first youth club in the borough to allow black and white children to socially mix with each other.

In later life, Pinder commented on the success of the Kentish Town Youth Club:

"It was a real breakthrough, the first youth club in the borough in which black and white kids could freely mix. We were told it couldn’t be done but it was a great success, with different clubs and workshops and a luncheon service for Haverstock School kids."

== Camden Afro Caribbean Organisation (ACO) ==
The Camden Afro Caribbean Organisation (ACO), of which Pinder was a key member, involved itself in numerous community projects. The ACO also gave Pinder, a committed communist activist, the opportunity to be open and expressive about his political beliefs. The ACO became an advice bureau which offered support to the victims of racism in housing and employment matters. They also became involved in a number of projects, including hosting a National conference for Black Youth and Community workers at the Reading Bulmershe college, and raising money for a headstone for the grave of

One key component of the Camden Afro Caribbean Organisation was to reach out and create connections with other black organisations both in Britain and across the globe.

=== Grave of Claudia Jones campaign (1982-1984) ===
One of the key activities led by Pinder during his time with the ACO was his campaign to raise money for a grave headstone for Claudia Jones which was then placed next to the grave of Karl Marx in Highgate Cemetery. Founded in 1982, the campaign set to raise £1,500. Of the donations raised, £300 came from the Cuban embassy, another £300 came from the Chinese embassy, with further funds being donated by Labour Party MP Tony Benn. One man, a pensioner called Bill Fairman, cashed out his life insurance policy to help fund Claudia Jones new grave headstone.

The campaign was a success and the erection of the new headstone next to Karl Marx's grave took place in January 1984, at a ceremony attended by envoys from China and Cuba, the Morning Star journalist Mikki Doyle, and the author Buzz Johnson.

=== Paul Robeson House ===
During his time working with the Camden Afro Caribbean Organisation, Pinder played a key role in founding a youth hostel project which opened in 1976 called Paul Robeson House, (named after Paul Robeson). Pinder would recall how he and the young people he worked with campaigned to found Paul Robeson House:

"A group of youngsters I was working with couldn’t find anywhere to live and began squatting empty houses...” “In the end, we squatted a property in Belsize Park that was due to be renovated the next week. We said we would not move out until we were given another empty place that we could turn into a hostel.”

Camden's housing chief, Ken Livingstone, noticed this protest and intervened, offering a Victorian era double-fronted house in King's Cross which had been boarded up for several years, to be temporarily leased to the Camden Afro Caribbean Organisation, which Pinder turned into a drop-in project. Aided by the Commission for Racial Equality which awarded them a £725 funding grant, activists set about renovating this house. This house then became Paul Robeson House in 1976.

Paul Robeson House was opened at a "Paul Robeson Lecture" ceremony in Euston's Friends House, which was hosted by Tony Benn.

operated for seven years and provided a home for a maximum of 12 young people for a period of between several months to a year.

== Activities in later life ==
In 1978, Pinder was sacked from the Camden Committee for Community Relations (CCCR) on the grounds of "incompatibility". He believed that this was done because he had been highly critical of the organisation and questioned their commitment to fighting racism.

Pinder once served as the Deputy Youth Officer in the Inner London Borough of Islington. Following the demise of the Greater London Council in 1986, he was appointed the Principal Youth Officer for the London Borough of Hackney.

Pinder involved himself with a large number of community projects, including the Tower Hamlets African Caribbean Association, the Barbados Bursary, Caribbean House, the African Caribbean Youth Organisation in Newham, Harriet Tubman house in Hackney, later the Tony Cheeseman Foundation, where he worked as a management committee member.

In addition to his work in Britain, he is also an active member of the Barbados Democratic Labour Party.

In 2022, Pinder spoke at a memorial event for Claudia Jones in Highgate Cemetery.

== Political influences ==
A committed communist activist for most of his life, Pinder was also heavily influenced by Cheddi Jagan, the first person of Indian descent to become the leader of a country outside of Asia. Another figure in Caribbean and British politics who heavily influenced Pinder was Billy Strachan.

== Honours and awards ==
At the age of 80, Winston Pinder was awarded a "people's title" from Hackney community college.

== See also ==
- Trevor Carter
- Peter Blackman
- Charlie Hutchison
- Dorothy Kuya
- Caribbean News
