= Billy Strachan =

RAF officer and civil rights activist (1921–1998)

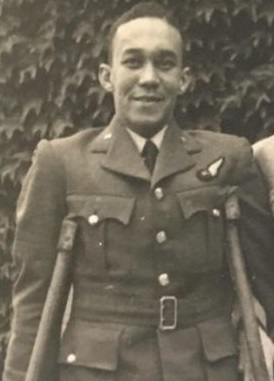
- Strachan in 1942
- Born: William Arthur Watkin Strachan; 16 April 1921; Kingston, Colony of Jamaica, British Empire
- Died: 26 April 1998 (aged 77)
- Other names: Bill Steel (pseudonym); Caliban (pseudonym)
- Education: Wolmer's Boys' High School, Kingston; Diploma in Administration with Education and Administrative Law. Bachelor of Law degree from the University of London
- Occupations: Civil servant, RAF bomber pilot, newspaper publisher, Chief Clerk of Courts
- Organization(s): Caribbean Labour Congress; Movement for Colonial Freedom; Seretse Khama Fighting Committee
- Known for: Communist activism Human rights activism Wartime service in the RAF
- Notable work: Founder of Caribbean News
- Political party: Communist Party of Great Britain (CPGB)
- Spouse(s): Joyce Smith (m. 1942; div. 1970s) Mary Collins (m. 1983)
- Military career
- Allegiance: United Kingdom
- Branch: Royal Air Force, No. 99 Squadron RAF, No. 101 Squadron RAF, No. 156 Squadron RAF of the Pathfinder squadron
- Service years: 1940–1946
- Rank: Flight Lieutenant
- Conflicts: Second World War

William Arthur Watkin Strachan (16 April 1921 – 26 April 1998) was a British communist, civil rights activist, and pilot. He is most noted for his achievements as a bomber pilot with the Royal Air Force (RAF) during the Second World War, and for his reputation as a highly influential figure within Britain's black communities.

As a teenager in Jamaica at the outbreak of the Second World War, Strachan sold all his possessions and travelled alone to Britain to join the RAF. He survived 33 bombing operations against Nazi Germany during a time when the average life expectancy for an RAF crew was seven operations. He survived numerous life-threatening situations including being shot by the Nazis, a training crash, the Nazi bombing of the hotel he was staying at during his honeymoon, and a near mid-air collision with Lincoln Cathedral. Rising to the rank of flight lieutenant, an extremely rare achievement for a Black person in Britain during the 1940s, he was charged with investigating incidents of racism on RAF bases throughout Britain, boosting the morale of many Caribbean men in the British military.

Postwar, Strachan became a communist and a human rights activist, campaigning for universal suffrage and worker's rights, and promoting anti-colonial and anti-imperialist politics. He was a leading member of the Communist Party of Great Britain (CPGB), an admirer of both the Cuban Revolution and the Viet Minh, and a committed communist activist for the rest of his life. His communist beliefs saw him become the victim of political persecution, once kidnapped by the United States for his communist politics, and being banned from legally travelling to multiple countries, including British Guiana, St Vincent, Grenada, Trinidad, and even his home country of Jamaica.

Between 1952 and 1956, Strachan published the newspaper Caribbean News, one of the first monthly Black newspapers in Britain. He was a mentor to many leading black civil rights activists in Britain, including Trevor Carter, Dorothy Kuya, Cleston Taylor, and Winston Pinder, and was a close personal friend of the president of Guyana, Cheddi Jagan. In later life, Strachan was called to the bar, becoming an expert on British laws regarding drink driving and adoption. He also helped found a charity that taught disabled people how to ride horses. He is recognised by numerous historians, activists, and academics as one of the most influential and respected black civil rights figures in British-Caribbean history, and a pioneer of black civil rights in Britain.

== Early life (1921–1938) ==
Billy Strachan was born in Jamaica on 16 April 1921 to a family of former slaves and was raised within a predominantly white and wealthy area of Kingston. Strachan recalled in interviews during his later life that his family had all been admirers of the British monarchy and the British Empire, all standing up in salute whenever the national anthem "God Save the King" was played. As a young boy, Strachan once stole his father's car, before his father then reported him to the police. During his school days, Strachan played the saxophone in a band with his friends.

=== Family background ===
Billy was raised alongside two sisters: Dorothy who migrated to Britain, and Allison who migrated to Canada. Cyril Strachan, Billy's father, was a black man who worked as a manager at a tobacco company. Although Cyril was far wealthier than most black Jamaicans during this time, he received lower wages in comparison to the white company directors, who worked far less intensely yet received enormous profits. Cyril admired the British Empire, believing that the British monarchy would protect them against the injustice of the colonial authorities in Jamaica. Despite not always being able to afford an elite lifestyle, Cyril would often attempt and fail to emulate the wealthy strata of Jamaican society.

Orynthia, Billy Strachan's mother, was (like most black Jamaicans) a descendant of enslaved African people. Billy's paternal grandfather was a wealthy Scottish man who fathered many illegitimate children with black women; however, he favoured Strachan's father Cyril, who never met his half-siblings.

=== Education ===
Strachan attended preparatory school between 1926 and 1931. From 1931 to 1938, he attended one of Jamaica's most prestigious yet racially divided schools, Wolmer's Boys' High School, in Kingston. His father often struggled to pay the school fees. Despite being described as a rebellious student, Strachan graduated.

Strachan would later describe the wealth and racial divide in the school, noting that more than half the boys were white fee-paying students who arrived in expensive cars such as limousines, while the rest were black or mixed-race who arrived either on foot or by bicycle. Although Strachan believed there was no physical violence between the children, there was very little social mixing between different races of children outside school hours.

=== Early experience of racism ===
Before he was old enough to attend school, Billy would only socialise with white children as a result of his relatively privileged upbringing. He experienced a traumatic racist incident when at the age of 11 while playing with a white girl, he was forced to hide under a bed from her racist father. This incident had a profound effect on Billy's worldview, leading to a lifelong hatred of racism.

=== Witnessing political unrest in Jamaica ===
In 1938, Jamaica experienced a wave of labour unrest as a result of the Great Depression; in January of the year, a strike by Kingston workers resulted in riots and 46 deaths, and further labour unrest occurred from May to June. These riots resulted in the British government dispatching a royal commission, which included British politician Stafford Cripps, to investigate the causes behind them. Strachan was taken by his father to listen to Cripps speak at a political meeting. During this meeting, Strachan witnessed the founding of the People's National Party.

== Military career (1939–1946) ==
=== Travelling to Britain ===
In 1939, after leaving school, Strachan gained employment as a civil service clerk in Jamaica. In response to the British declaration of war against Germany, he left his job in the civil service to join the British Royal Air Force (RAF). In order to fund his voyage to England, Strachan sold his bicycle and saxophone. Struggling to afford the trip to England, he became the only passenger on a merchant ship which had previously arrived in Jamaica full of wealthy passengers escaping the war in Europe for the safety of the Caribbean. Strachan risked the long and dangerous journey in U-boat-infested waters, spending his time smashing tin cans to provide metal for Britain's war effort against Germany. He was the only passenger on the entire ship during the approximately month-long trip, being given a first-class cabin and the honour of dining with the ship's captain.

=== Joining the Royal Air Force ===
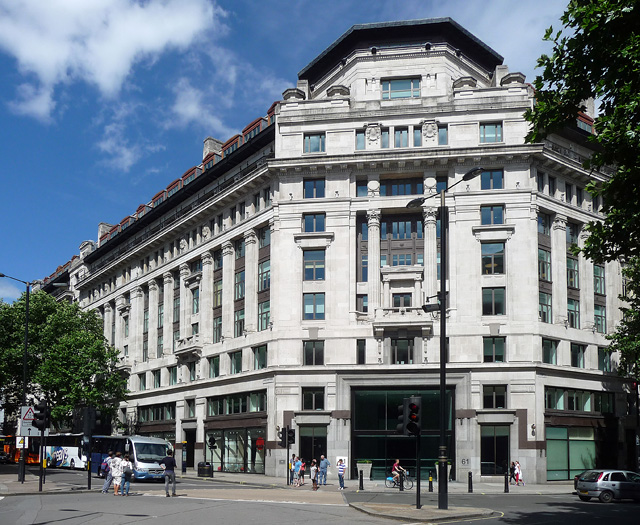
Adastral House, later renamed "Television House", where Strachan attempted to join the Royal Air Force (RAF).

Strachan arrived in Bristol in March 1940, with little money and a suitcase containing only one spare change of clothes. Struggling to understand British culture, Strachan saluted a porter at a train station in Bristol, believing that he was an admiral because of his work uniform. He then travelled to London, arriving at Paddington station, and spent a night at the YMCA near Tottenham Court Road. The next day he met a Jewish refugee at a TMCA meeting who told Strachan about the Nazi Party and her reasons for fleeing Europe. Strachan said this experience was the first time he had ever heard about what was happening in Nazi Germany. After another night at the YMCA, Strachan travelled to the Air Ministry based in Adastral House (Television House), believing that this was where he was supposed to enlist in the RAF. The airmen on guard duty at the Air Ministry racially abused Strachan, telling him that "his sort" should "go back to where they came from". Some sources say that the guard told Strachan to "piss off".

After this exchange with the guard, a sergeant passed by and told Strachan that Adastral House was not the correct place to enlist in the RAF. When the sergeant asked where he came from, Strachan told him he was from Kingston in Jamaica. However, the sergeant mistakenly believed that he meant Kingston in Surrey and told him to travel there to enlist.

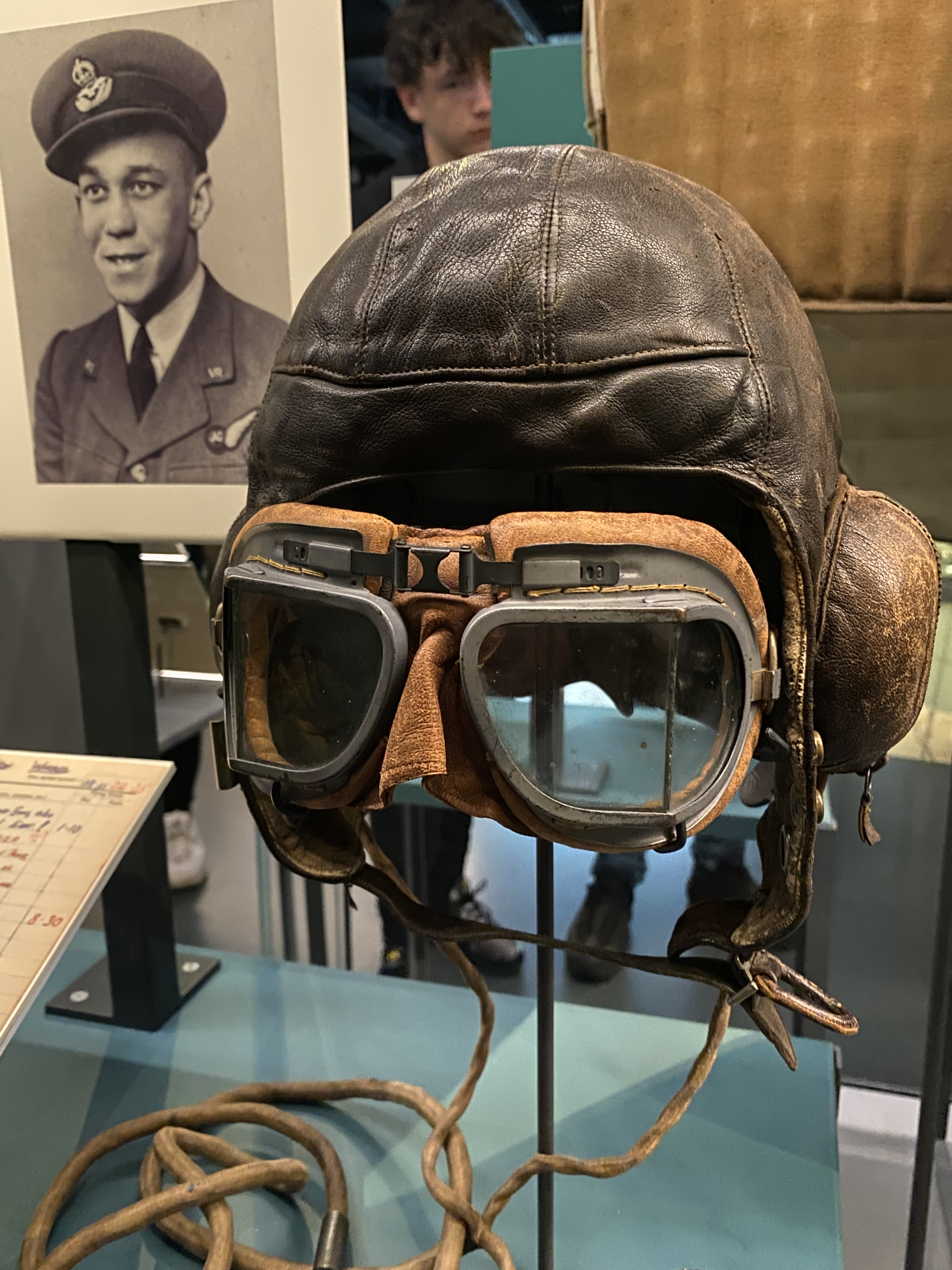
Strachan's flying helmet and goggles

Eventually, a young officer came to Strachan's aid, telling Strachan that he was educated and knew that Jamaica was in West Africa. Strachan decided it was best not to correct the young officer on Jamaica's actual location. Later in life, he described the young officer as a "Hooray Henry type", a pejorative British term for an arrogant upper-class man. Strachan was taken inside the building and introduced to a Flight Lieutenant. He underwent health, education and intelligence tests; passing all these tests, he was given an RAF uniform. He was sent on a train to Blackpool later that evening for military training.

=== Air force training ===
Aged 18, Strachan arrived at the RAF base in Blackpool for training. He was the only non-white recruit, and many of his fellow recruits accused him of being crazy when he told them he had left the peace of the Caribbean to travel to wartime Britain. Strachan and the men he trained alongside were taught by a corporal who happened to be a former circus clown for Bertram Mills. He told his men that he would choose the most physically fit recruit to be his deputy, which happened to be Strachan, and the corporal told Strachan: "Darky, you are my deputy." Strachan was emotionally torn by the racial insult, which he had never been called before as he was relatively light-skinned in comparison to the majority of black people in Jamaica. Despite his conflicted feelings, he was glad to have been promoted to squad deputy.

=== Bombing missions against Nazi Germany ===
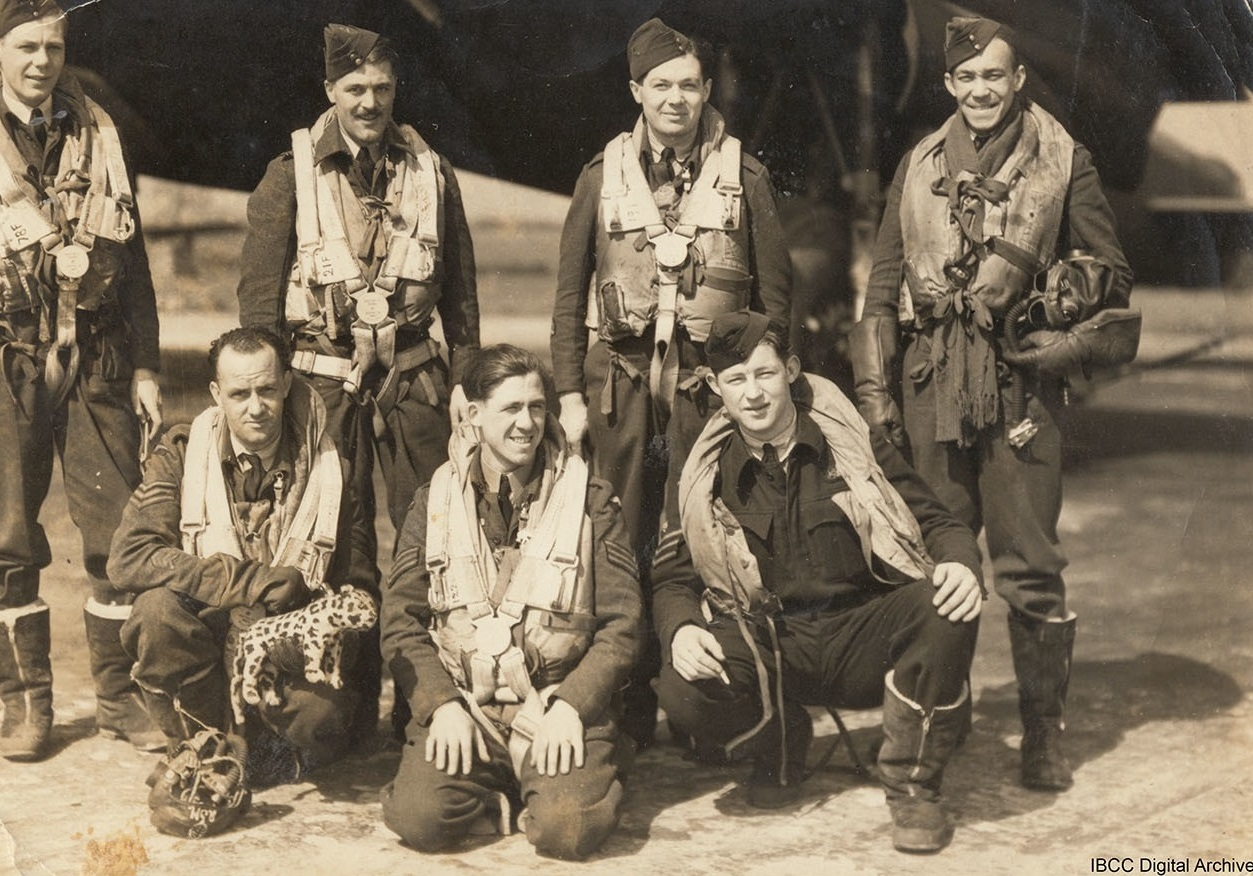
Strachan's 576 Squadron crew who flew from RAF Fiskerton in 1945. Billy Strachan is standing on the right, and Len Dorricott, his navigator, is on the left. The Australian wireless operator, R Fuller, is crouching bottom right.

Strachan was trained in aircrew skills and his first bombing mission was over Nazi-occupied Europe in June 1941. He was initially a radio operator, then he became a gunner, flying a tour of operations in RAF Bomber Command as an air gunner on Vickers Wellington bomber aeroplanes with No. 156 Squadron. After completing his first tour of 30 operations Strachan retrained as a pilot, flying solo after only seven hours of training. He undertook 15 operations as a pilot with No. 576 Squadron, flying Avro Lancasters from RAF Fiskerton in Lincolnshire.

Strachan shared his advice on how he managed to survive being targeted by German aircraft: "The trick," he explained, "was to wait until the enemy was right on your tail and, at the last minute, cut the engines, sending the aircraft into a plunging dive, letting the fighter overshoot harmlessly above." He also vividly recalled seeing four-engined Soviet bombers during a bombing mission over Berlin in 1941 . He was greatly impressed by the Soviet aircraft, realising that their chances of returning to the Soviet Union were extremely slim. During a night raid over Germany in October 1941, he was wounded in the left leg by a Nazi fighter aeroplane, a wound that caused him medical problems throughout his life.

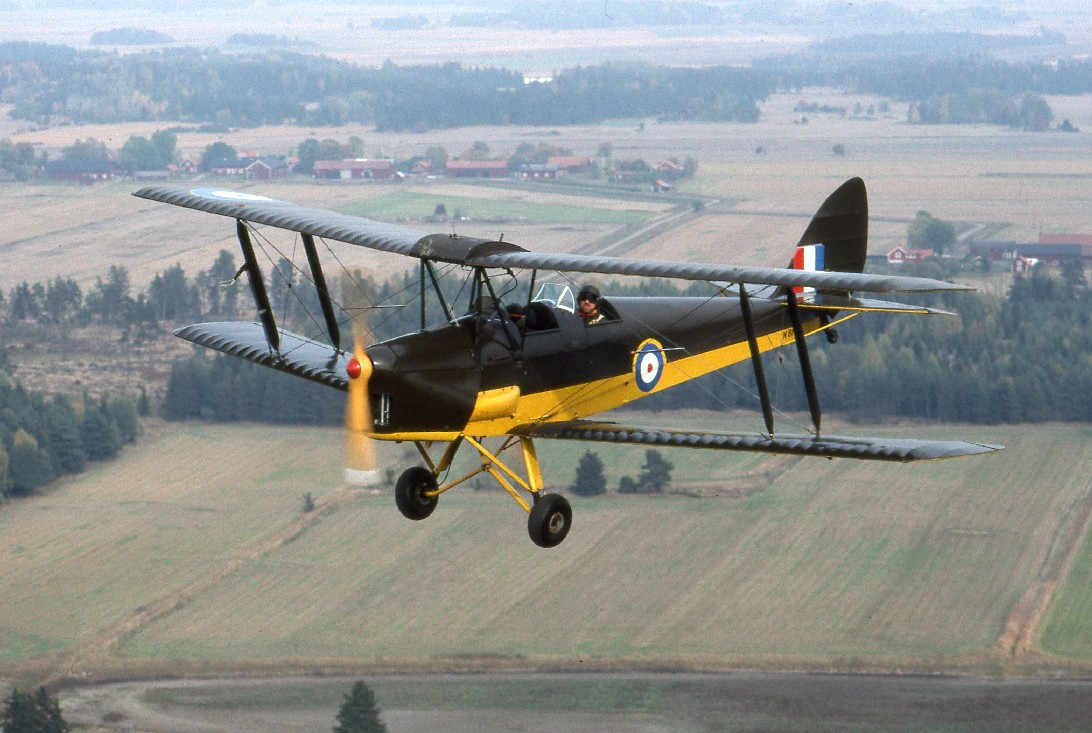
Tiger Moth aircraft, similar to the one Strachan crashed during a training accident.

=== Training flight crash ===
Recalling his youth, Strachan described himself during the war as being at his peak of both physical and mental health, and very self-assured and cocky. He was prone to "joyriding" and attempting dangerous tricks despite the disapproval of his instructors. During a training flight in a Tiger Moth aircraft, he crashed the aeroplane and was sent to Ely Hospital in Wales. He had damaged his face and hips, suffered a broken nose, broken cheekbones, a fractured right hip, and was in a semi-coma for three weeks.

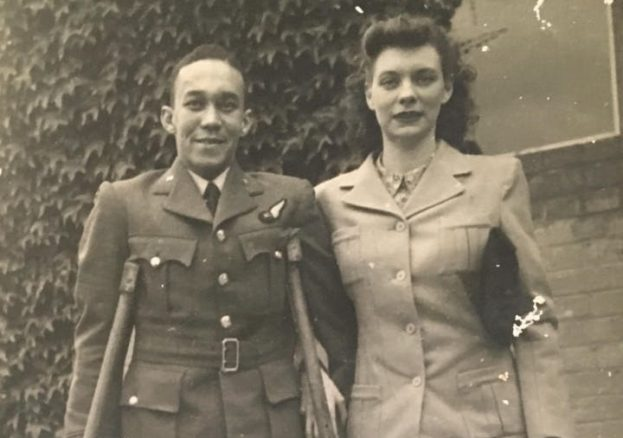
Strachan with his first wife Joyce Smith

=== Wartime marriage and commission ===
Despite ongoing recovery from his plane crash, 1942 saw Strachan marry Joyce Smith, a Londoner he'd met before the accident. They married while he was still using crutches and recovering from his injuries. For their honeymoon, the couple visited the Palace Hotel in Torquay, where they were almost killed when the Luftwaffe bombed the hotel. On 21 January, by now a sergeant, Strachan received an emergency commission as a pilot officer. He was promoted to war-substantive flying officer on 1 October.

=== Near collision with Lincoln Cathedral ===
Having survived more than 30 missions, Strachan's nerves were finally shattered by a near collision with Lincoln Cathedral during a flight in which he was the pilot. This incident occurred while he was piloting an aeroplane carrying a bomb weighing 12,000 lb (6,000 kg) intended to be dropped on German ships. He recalled the events of this incident, the stress of which ended his ability to continue his career as a pilot:

I asked my engineer to make sure we were on course to get over the top of the cathedral, He replied 'We've just passed it.' I looked out and suddenly realised that it was just beyond our wing-tips. It was sheer luck. I hadn't seen it at all – and I was the pilot. There and then my nerve went. I realised I couldn't go on. This was the last straw. I knew it was the end of me as a pilot. I flew to a special 'hole' in the North Sea where no allied shipping ever went near and dropped my 'big one'. Then I flew back to the airfield.

Following this incident, Strachan was sent to a large country house in Coventry where he stayed for 48 hours. A psychiatrist who interviewed him attributed his behaviour to war weariness.

=== Racial advisor to the RAF ===
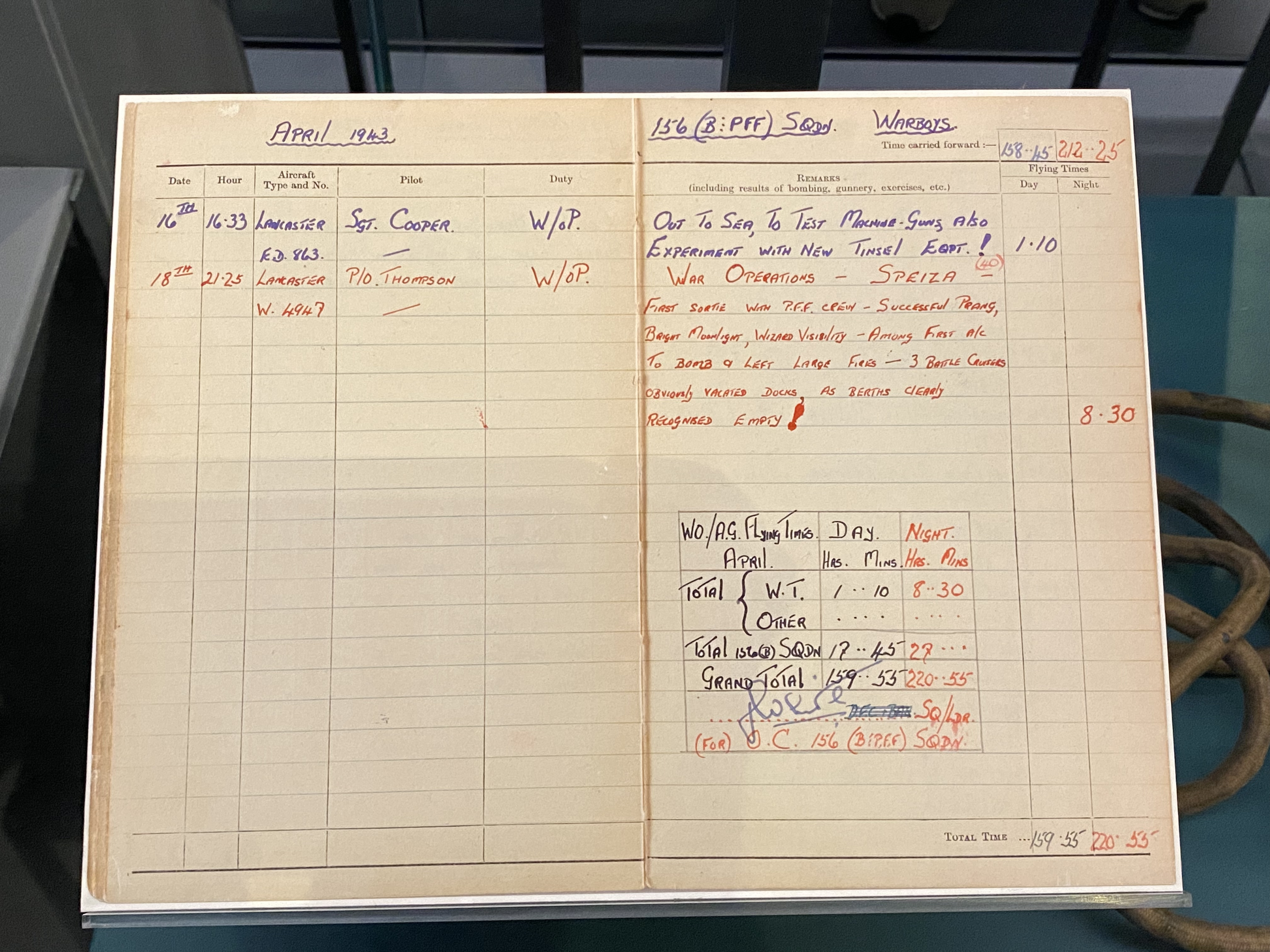
Strachan's log book during his service with the RAF

Many Caribbean men who had travelled to Britain to join the RAF found themselves being given lowly jobs despite wanting to fight the Nazis. Racial tensions arose in RAF bases between black and white personnel. On the recommendation of political writer Una Marson and cricketer Learie Constantine, both of whom advised the British government on black racial issues, the Royal Air Force dispatched experienced Afro-Caribbean officers to investigate racial problems in RAF installations. Strachan, having been promoted to war-substantive flight lieutenant on 23 January 1944, was sent to an RAF base in Bedfordshire to investigate racial tensions between black and white military personnel. During his time at the Bedfordshire RAF base, a riot broke out in the canteen between black and white servicemen. He ordered them all to stop fighting and most of the personnel obeyed except for two white men, who advanced towards him. Strachan then ordered a white corporal to arrest the two approaching men, which the corporal did, giving a great boost of morale to the black RAF personnel on the base. Strachan considered this incident an important moment in his life.

On 11 June 1945, a month after the war in Europe had ended, Strachan was transferred to the Administrative & Special Duties branch of the RAF. At the request of Una Marson, whose ideas on race and politics exerted substantial influence on Strachan's worldview, he was made an RAF liaison officer charged with investigating incidents of racial discrimination within the RAF. During this time, he once sat as a member of courts-martial, and in incidents he worked as an advocate on behalf of black servicemen – experiences that his biographer, David Horsley, theorised inspired Strachan's future career in law. Another influential moment for him during his time in the RAF was when a fellow Caribbean RAF member gave him a copy of Capitalism and Slavery, written by Eric Williams.

== Summary of Strachan's wartime achievements ==
Strachan rose to the rank of flight lieutenant within the RAF, a rare achievement for a black person in 1940s Britain. He completed 33 missions against Nazi Germany when statistically most bomber crew did not survive their (30 operation) tours. During his career, he took part in missions over the skies of Auxerre, Rotterdam, the Ruhr, and Berlin, among many other locations throughout Europe. His rise within the ranks of the RAF earned him a personal servant known as a "batman". His batman had previously been the servant of the British King George VI. Once, while stationed in Yorkshire near Hull, Strachan visited a dentist in an underground surgery, returning to the surface to find that all the buildings above ground had been destroyed by bombs.

By the end of his military career, Strachan had served with both 99 Squadron and 101 Squadron as an air gunner/wireless operator, before becoming a pilot in 156 Squadron a squadron of the elite Pathfinder Force. Strachan was demobilised on 30 October 1946 with the rank of flight lieutenant.

== Political activism ==
=== Brief return to Jamaica (1946–1947) ===
By 1946, Strachan had become the father of three sons: Christopher, Jeremy, and Mark. Strachan, his wife Joyce and their children, all briefly moved to Jamaica in 1946, and he resumed the civil service job that he had held prior to the war. Racism continued to plague his civilian career, as he was denied promotions in the civil service based on his race. Outraged at the racism that blocked him from promotion, Strachan wrote multiple letters to news media, although he signed the letters in his wife's name since he was not allowed to openly criticise the authorities as a civil servant. Many of these letters were noticed by Dr David Lewis, a communist activist who worked in a nearby leper colony in Port Royal. Strachan and Lewis began to meet one another frequently and Lewis introduced Strachan to Marxist political theory, inspiring him to become a lifelong communist. Lewis admired Strachan's leadership skills and invited him back to Britain to help create the London branch of the Caribbean Labour Congress, an organisation dedicated to promoting worker's rights and universal suffrage in the Caribbean.

=== Communist and black activism in Britain (1947–1998) ===
Returning to Britain in 1947, Strachan joined the Communist Party of Great Britain (CPGB) and quickly became an active member, holding weekly street meetings and selling the Daily Worker. Strachan would from then on support the communist movement for the rest of his life and was an avid supporter of both the Soviet Union and the Chinese Communist Party. With his wife and his family, he moved to Brondesbury, London, where the couple sold the Daily Worker. While in Brondesbury, Strachan gave weekly political speeches every Saturday at number 3, Brondesbury Villas, and often wrote on issues of poverty and immigration for local newspapers. Come the 1950 United Kingdom general election, the CPGB qualified to run and Strachan held his radio out of his house window and turned up the volume, so as to let the entire street hear Harry Pollitt's election broadcast. Strachan and his wife, who was at this time also a committed communist activist, held CPGB meetings in their house in Kilburn, London. The Strachan family later moved to Colindale, which also happened to be the home of leading communist activists Harry Pollitt, Reg Birch, and Peter Kerrigan, where the Strachans became close to other families with communist political beliefs.

When the Afro-Caribbean communist and civil rights leader Trevor Carter moved to Britain, he began living with the Strachan family and stayed with them for several years. Carter was the cousin of famous Black-British civil rights activist and communist leader Claudia Jones, who founded one of Britain's early black newspapers, the West Indian Gazette, which both Carter and Strachan helped to launch. Carter in later life recalled the Strachan family fondly, saying that he felt "a true affection in the Strachan family." Cleston Taylor, another Caribbean communist who worked closely with Strachan, claimed that Strachan would visit local cinemas and would stand on the stage and denounce the movie to the audience if the film showed a racist scene. Among other black civil rights activists and communists Strachan knew, included Winston Pinder and Phil Sealey.

Between the late 1940s and 1990s, Strachan had written articles for many newspapers and journals, many of which were openly communist. He often wrote them under the pseudonyms "Bill Steel" or "Caliban". Examples of communist publications for which Strachan wrote include the Daily Worker, Comment, Caribbean News, and Labour Monthly. In 1954, Strachan wrote the chapter "Terror in the West Indies" for the Report of the Second Conference of Workers Parties Within the Sphere of British Imperialism, from their conference held in London.

In 1954, a cartoon titled "Family Portrait?" appeared in the Daily Sketch, mocking Strachan for his anti-colonial and anti-imperialist beliefs, depicting him with devil horns representing the Caribbean Labour Congress, and posing with Hewlett Johnson, Paul Robeson, all posing with a portrait of Stalin.

Following the Cuban Revolution in 1959, Strachan helped to organise a fleet of buses to be sent to Cuba. During the 1970s, he was involved with the Angela Davis Defence Committee's London branch.

As more West Indians arrived in Britain, the more radical elements of the black community also joined the CPGB, with many of them seeing Strachan as their leader. His activism as a CPGB member put him into contact with many influential British communists and socialists including Kay Beauchamp, Palme Dutt, and Cheddi Jagan. Culturally, Strachhan also came into contact with the works of communist musicians, including Alan Bush, A. L. Lloyd, Ewan MacColl, and with the dramas of Bertolt Brecht. Strachan became an important member of the CPGB's International Committee and their West Indian Committee. According to the Morning Star newspaper, Strachan told one of his sons: "Because of the way my life was to go if I hadn't discovered Marxism I would have undoubtedly ended up in a mental institution."

=== Caribbean Labour Congress (CLC) (1948–1956) ===
In 1948, Strachan helped to found the London branch of the Caribbean Labour Congress (CLC), a socialist organisation dedicated to promoting worker's rights and universal suffrage in the Caribbean. The CLC sought to create an alliance of left-wing nationalists and communists across the British Empire, and was associated with the World Federation of Trade Unions. Strachan was elected to serve as the secretary of the London branch from its founding in 1948 to 1956.

As the leader of the London Branch of the CLC, Strachan directed the organisation's political efforts into a number of different issues, including supporting Kenyan independence fighters during the Mau Mau rebellion, supporting Sudanese and Egyptian independence, anti-Apartheid activism, expressing solidarity with the victims of racist American courts such as the Martinsville Seven and Willie McGee, and supporting the Viet Minh in their war of national liberation against the French Empire. They also campaigned against British foreign policy towards Saint Vincent, Grenada, and British Guiana. In 1950 Strachan wrote a letter to the editor of The Manchester Guardian defending Seretse Khama, a Black African man who had been persecuted for marrying a white woman, and naming himself as the Joint Secretary of the Seretse Khama Fighting Committee.

Under Strachan's leadership, the London branch of the CLC held regular educational classes for its members, reading books such as Eric William's Negro in the Caribbean, Cheddi Jagan's Forbidden Freedom, Harold Moody's Negro Victory, Andrew Rothstein's A People Reborn, Learie Constantine's Colour Bar, and Richard Hart's Origin and development of the People of Jamaica.

Aside from political events, Strachan encouraged the CLC to host social events such as dances, which were advertised in the both Daily Worker and Caribbean News. These events not only helped to spread Caribbean culture to local British people and provide entertainment and friendship to newly arrived Caribbean immigrants, but also provided funding for the CLC and Caribbean News.

Among the organisations known to have kept close contact with the London branch of the CLC were the League of Coloured Peoples, World Federation of Democratic Youth, the Young Communist League, the National Assembly of Women, the Electrical Trades Union, and the Amalgamated Engineering Union.

During a 1951 meeting in Lambeth Town Hall, Brixton, hosted by Labour Party MP Marcus Lipton, Strachan expressed his anger at the British government's attempts to scapegoat black immigrants for their failure to solve the post-war housing crisis.

One issue that particularly bothered Strachan and the CLC was the British government's removal of the administration of Cheddi Jagan in British Guiana in 1953. Strachan took up this issue and mobilised the CLC to campaign against the removal of Jagan's government, mobilising all his contacts, Communist party activists, left-wing Labour Party members, and trade unionists, to ensure that the issue was brought up in the British Parliament. This began a life-long friendship between Strachan and both Jagan and his wife, Janet Jagan.

In 1956, the London branch of the Caribbean Labour Congress reformed into a new organisation called the Caribbean National Congress, without Strachan serving as secretary. However, without his leadership, both this new organisation and Caribbean News soon collapsed. Afterwards, he dedicated his efforts to the Communist Party of Great Britain and became a founding member of the Movement for Colonial Freedom under the leadership of Labour Party politician Fenner Brockway.

=== Windrush generation (1948) ===
With the 1948 arrival of the HMT Empire Windrush to Britain transporting hundreds of West Indians, Strachan and the London branch of the Caribbean Labour Congress established a committee to help them and arranged a welcoming event at Holborn Hall in July of that same year. Strachan soon began receiving letters, primarily from men, expressing their difficulties in securing employment and accommodation, many of these letters being written to him due partly to his reputation as a war hero, and others because he was the secretary of the London branch of the Caribbean Labour Congress. These letters requesting aid from Strachan and the CLC put him at the forefront as an early pioneer of Black civil rights in Britain.

=== Caribbean News (1952–1956) ===
Strachan came to believe it was necessary to create a regular newspaper that could reflect the views of the London branch of the Caribbean Labour Congress (CLC). His initiative produced a socialist and Anti-imperialist newspaper called Caribbean News, which was published between 1952 and 1956. This paper became the first Black British newspaper dedicated to socialism, anti-imperialism, and Caribbean independence. David Horsley describes Caribbean News as "the first Black British monthly newspaper dedicated to the ideals of Caribbean independence, socialism, and solidarity with colonial and oppressed people throughout the world."

Caribbean News often carried a column called "Billy's Corner", dedicated to articles written by Strachan. The paper also published articles by Birmingham civil rights leader and fellow Communist activist Henry Gunter, most famous for helping to desegregate Birmingham's transport. Articles published in Caribbean News often stressed the importance of trade unions for all British workers. Another topic that Caribbean News often dealt with was racism in British society, highlighting the racist banning of the African American blues singer Big Bill Broonzy from a hotel in Nottingham, and in 1954 publicising an instance where white coal miners in Derbyshire refused to accept the colour bar (segregation) used against a Jamaican miner. At a meeting in 1953, Strachan reported that Caribbean News had a circulation of 2,000 copies, half of which were sent to the West Indies and the rest circulated across Britain. The final issue of Caribbean News contained an interview with Claudia Jones.

=== Caribbean tour and political persecution (1952) ===
In 1952, reactionary conservative leaders in the Caribbean, led by Grantley Adams of Barbados, turned on their left-wing and anti-colonial allies, persecuting all whom they believed to be communists. Adams ordered Strachan and the London branch of the Caribbean Labour Congress to disband; however, the branch voted overwhelmingly in favour of continuing their activities and ignored this demand. There was also an attempt by reactionary leaders to ban copies of Caribbean News from being sent to the West Indies.

In defiance of Adams and his persecution of leftist activists, Strachan planned a speaking tour of the Caribbean alongside fellow communist Caribbean activist Ferdinand Smith, who was most notable for co-founding the first desegregated union in the history of the United States. In 1952, Strachan and Smith embarked on their speaking tour of the Caribbean, organised by the World Federation of Trade Unions, an organisation in which Smith was a leading member. They first stopped at Strachan's birthplace, Kingston, Jamaica, but following harassment from customs authorities the pair immediately travelled to Trinidad. Upon arriving in Trinidad, Strachan and Smith were arrested and deported for being "undesirables". Also banned from staying in St. Vincent, Grenada, and British Guyana, the pair returned to Jamaica.

Again arriving in Jamaica, Strachan and Smith were welcomed by Jamaican politician Richard Hart, who toured Jamaica with them and even wrote a calypso song for Smith and Strachan titled "The Ferdie and Billy Calypso". The tour of Jamaica was a success; however, when Strachan and Smith attempted to return to Europe via the United States, they were kidnapped by the United States government and were imprisoned on Ellis Island, before being deported.

== Legal career and charitable activities ==
=== Successful legal career ===
After returning to Britain from his tour of the British West Indies, Strachan began to self-study law, while also raising his young family. He had wanted to study law earlier but could not afford to do so, due to the combined weight of his family commitments, his political work, and his fulltime employment, first as a cost-accountant in Kilburn for a baker's and confectioners, then later as a clerical assistant for Middlesex County Council. His study of British laws was supported by D. N. Pritt and John Platts-Mills.

Strachan intensely studied law using books he borrowed from the library, and in 1959 he was called to the bar. He earned his Bachelor of Law degree from the University of London in 1967. He worked as Clerk of Court and held several important positions as the Chief Clerk at Clerkenwell Magistrates' Court, and he then held the same position at Hampstead Magistrates' Court, becoming the Clerk to the Betting and Gaming Committee. Strachan was elected the President of Inner London Justices' Clerks' Society.

Pansy Jeffrey, a civil rights activist and a founder of the Pepper Pot Centre, said that Strachan once advised her to become a magistrate.

Due to the political persecution of communists in Britain, he could no longer continue to be an open communist, so it was decided by the CPGB leadership that he should no longer hold a party card but could still support the party in other ways. In 1971, Strachan was elected president of the Inner London Justices Clerks Society, before becoming involved in Lord Avebury's investigation into the death of Walter Rodney, a political leader in Guyana.

=== Riding for the Disabled Association ===
Despite suffering terrible pain from an injury he sustained during the Second World War, Strachan greatly enjoyed horse riding. He became a key figure in the creation of the Riding for the Disabled Association, a British charity that provides horse-riding lessons to disabled people. Strachan served as the secretary of the Harrow Branch of the charity. According to the Morning Star, Strachan strategically allowed the British princess Anne, daughter of British Queen Elizabeth, to serve as the charity's president, while he himself served as the charity's vice-president. During the 1970s, Strachan and his wife Joyce divorced. During the 1980s, while horse-riding, he met a woman called Mary Collins, who in 1983 became his second wife, this marriage lasting for the rest of his life.

=== Later life ===
Aside from chasing a career in law, Strachan continued to be politically active in anti-colonial and socialist politics for the remainder of his life, and supported the British communist movement until his death. He was also one of the founders of the Movement for Colonial Freedom. He was a supporter of Grenada's New Jewel Movement and opposed both American intervention in Haiti and the UK Labour Party's intervention in Anguilla in 1969. In 1977, Strachan condemned then Home Secretary David Owen for refusing to halt the execution of two Black people in Bermuda. Strachan then became a founding member of Caribbean Labour Solidarity (CLS), an organisation formed in London by his friends Richard Hart and Cleston Taylor in 1974.

Strachan contributed to a programme that allowed students from the Caribbean to study in the Soviet Union free of charge, using his connections with politicians in the Caribbean to find men and women from working-class backgrounds who otherwise would never have been able to afford a university education.

During the 1980s and 1990s there came a growing awareness of the contribution of Caribbean people in Britain's war efforts against Germany during the Second World War, and Strachan used his skills in public speaking to give countless interviews to television and radio shows concerning this topic, and was featured in articles by the Daily Mail and The Times on his war experiences.

Strachan was a close friend of both Cheddi Jagan, the first chief minister of Guyana and the first person of Indian descent to become the leader of a country outside Asia, and Guyana's president and wife of Cheddi, Janet Jagan. During one trip to Guyana in 1996 as a guest of the Jagans, Strachan began to feel ill and upon his return to Britain it was discovered that he was suffering from motor neuron disease. Strachan was cared for by his wife during his final years, and died on 26 April 1998.

== Legacy ==
=== Funeral ===
A memorial meeting for Strachan was held on 5 July 1998, attracting a large number of influential political leaders and activists including Trevor Carter, Richard Hart, John La Rose, Cleston Taylor, Phil Sealey, Clem Derrick, Ranjana Sidhanti Ash, Norma Gibbs, and Raymond Kudrath.

=== Legacy and influence ===
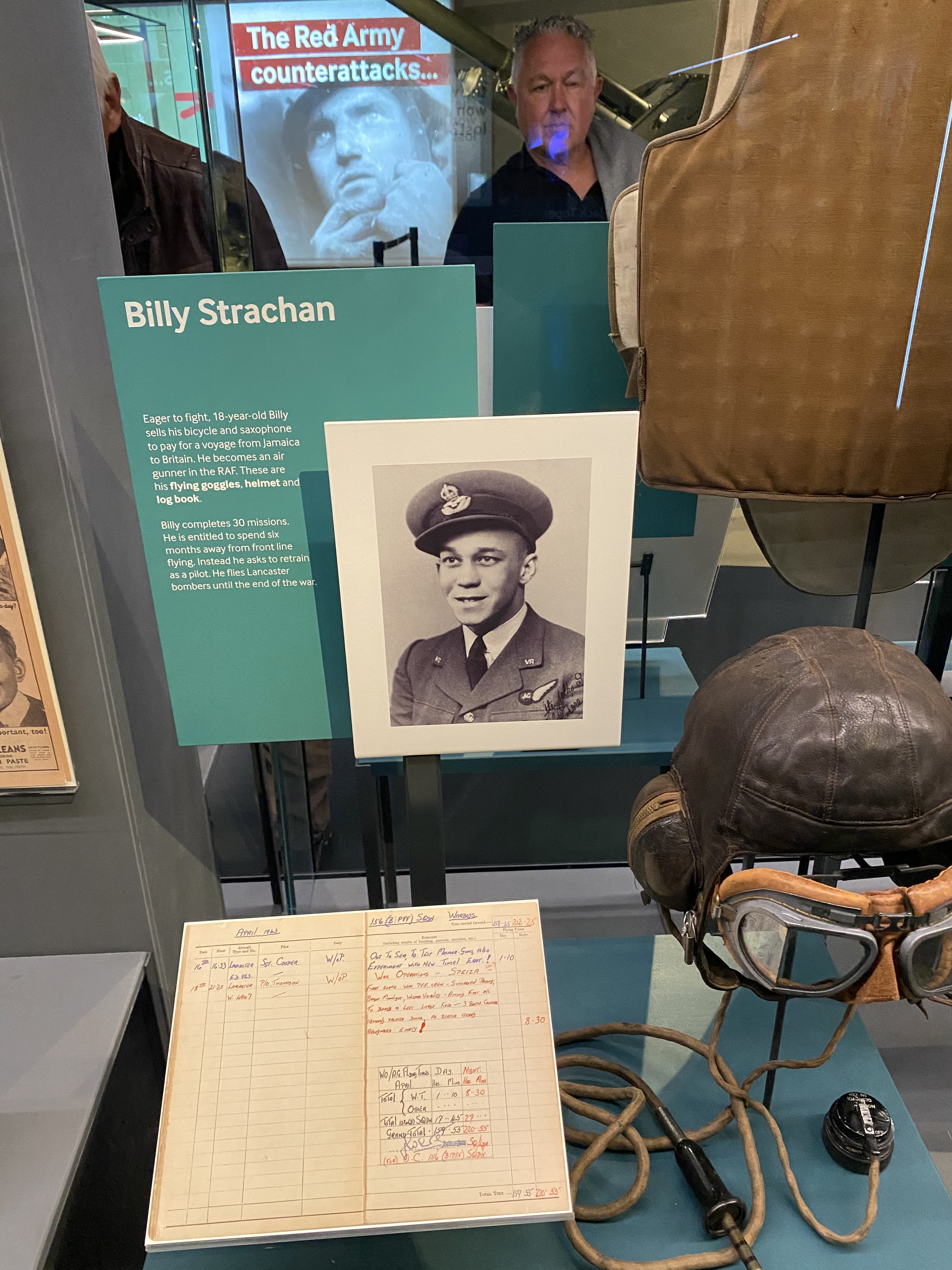
A display dedicated to Strachan in the WWII galleries of the Imperial War Museum, London (2022).

Strachan is recognised by numerous historians, activists, and academics as one of the most influential and respected black civil rights figures in British-Caribbean history, and a pioneer of black civil rights. Journalist John Gulliver described him as having lived a "life of sheer heroism". Strachan's biographer, David Horsley, characterises him as a "civil rights pioneer", and a "remarkable and often overlooked figure in British Caribbean history". Strachan was held in high regard by many leading British black civil rights activists, including Trevor Carter, Claudia Jones, Cleston Taylor, and Winston Pinder, the latter describing Strachan as "our father". Communist activist Bob Newland, a member of the London Recruits who travelled to apartheid South Africa to support the African National Congress, called Strachan his mentor. Strachan was also praised by many Caribbean leaders whom he had known during his life, among them Richard Hart, John La Rose, and Cheddi Jagan.

Strachan played a role in supporting the work of Dorothy Kuya, a Black British civil rights leader and communist activist; she was Liverpool's first community relations officer, and Strachan travelled to Liverpool to speak for Kuya when she was applying for the job of community relations officer in the city. This helped kickstart Kuya's career, which led to her successful campaign for the eventual establishment of the International Slavery Museum in Liverpool.

While Strachan has been recognised and celebrated by many of the above, some researchers note that many key texts and sources on black history in Britain made no mention of him, even when the authors were likely to have known him personally. David Horsley, who in 2019 published the biography Billy Strachan 1921–1988 RAF Officer, Communist, Civil Rights Pioneer, Legal Administrator, Internationalist and Above All Caribbean Man, believes that historians have intentionally ignored Strachan, due partially to his communist beliefs. In January 2020, the Marx Memorial Library in London held an event to piece together the facts of Strachan's life, with the event attended by historical researchers and members of the Strachan family.

=== Television, radio, and fiction ===
As a public and influential figure within Britain's black communities, Strachan made several notable appearances in British media. In 1955, Strachan was interviewed by Pathé News for a report titled Our Jamaican Problem, where he acted as a spokesperson for black people in Britain. Then in 1989, Strachan appeared in BBC Radio 4's The Invisible Force, aired on 16 May that same year.

According to the British newspaper the Daily Mail, British television presenter Lenny Henry was set to star in a biographical film based on Strachan's life, titled A Wing and a Prayer; however, the script was never turned into a movie. Peter Frost, a researcher of British leftist history, wrote in the Morning Star that he believed Strachan's communist beliefs were somewhat responsible for the movie not being created. Though not making an appearance in the story, Andrea Levy's novel Small Island (2004) contained two main characters which were inspired by Billy Strachan's life.

=== Comments on his life ===
Britain's Black History Month Magazine described Strachan as "a World War 2 R.A.F. hero, a Civil Rights pioneer and leader, a life long Communist, a prominent law officer, and a gifted writer." After Strachan's death, the former president of Guyana, Janet Jagan, said of him: "Billy was my friend, my comrade, my mentor for most of my adult life. He was a genuine Caribbean man always in the forefront of labour and political challenges of our region I will miss him very much. Life without Billy is not the same". The Communist Party of Britain, the continuation of the original Communist Party of Great Britain (CPGB) of which Strachan had been a member, said: "Billy Strachan was a true Communist dedicating his adult life to a better world for all, one without exploitation, poverty and racism."

The president of Caribbean Labour Solidarity, Luke Daniels, praised Strachan's life and commitment to fighting racism, recommending his biography as "essential reading for all Caribbean peoples and for those looking for inspiration in the fight for justice the world over as Billy was a true internationalist and engaged imperialism wherever it presented its ugly head." Strachan's son, Chris Strachan, cited his father as an inspiration in the fight against racism in 21st-century Britain: "Himself a victim of prejudice and discrimination, he fought hard for a world of tolerance and equality. With the rise of the far-Right today, the work of Billy Strachan remains today an example but also largely unfinished business."

=== Historical archives ===
In 1987, London's Imperial War Museum interviewed Strachan on his life and recorded and published the audio, which can be listened to by the public as a part of the Imperial War Museum Sound Archive. The Imperial War Museum also holds physical items used by Strachan during WWII, including a leather flying helmet, and flying goggles. One display in the museum's Second World War galleries created by History Professor Richard Overy featured objects relating to Strachan. The UK National Archives hold records relating to Trinidad barring Strachan from entering the country, and further archival material relevant to Strachan's life, including 40 boxes from his personal collections, is held at the University of London.

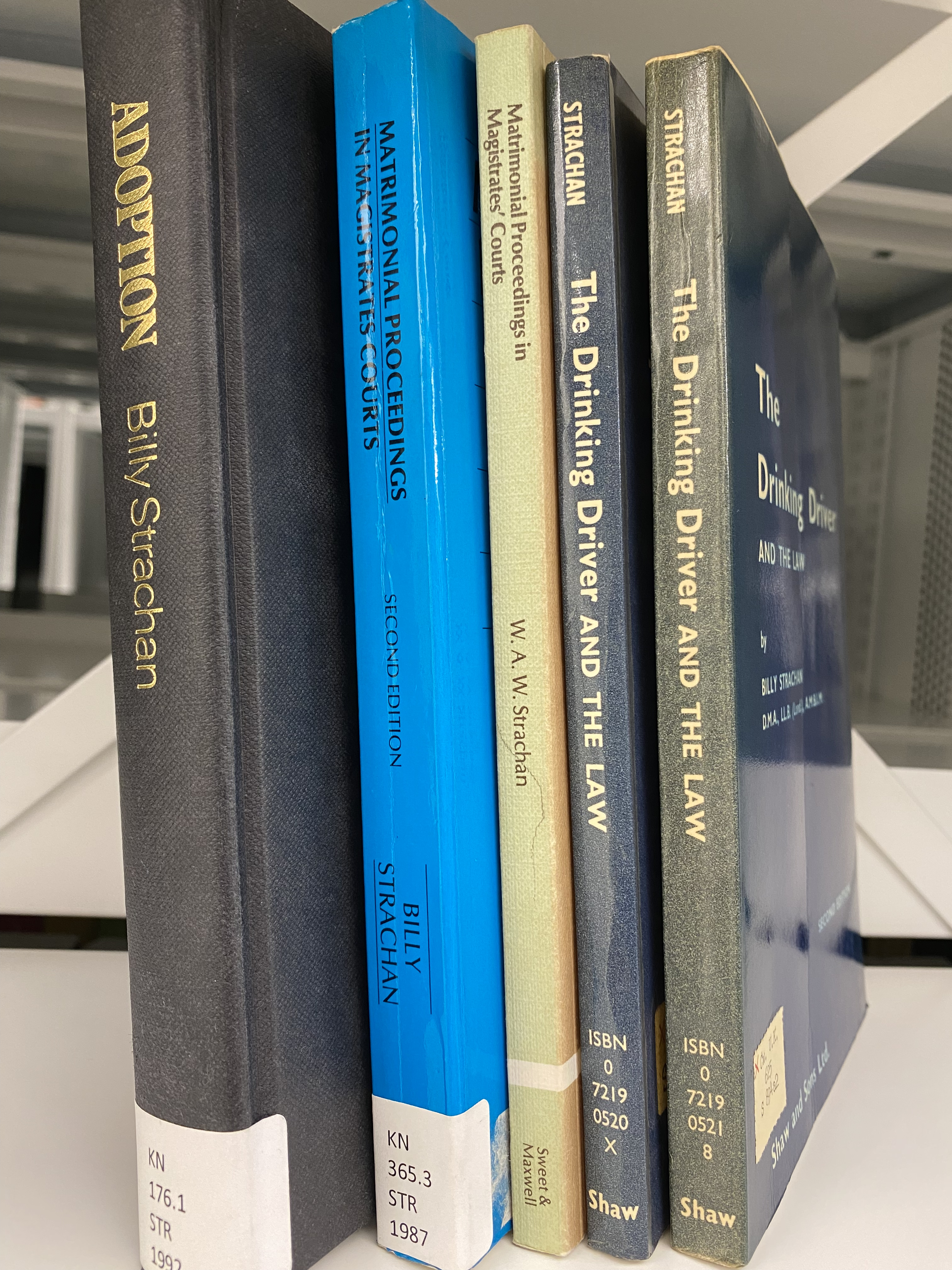
A selection of books written by Strachan

== Works written by Strachan ==
- The Story of a Colony: Sugar (1955)
- Natural Justice: Principle and Practice (1976)
- The Drinking Driver and the Law (1973)
- Matrimonial Proceedings in Magistrates' Courts (1982)
- Adoption (1992)

== See also ==
- Olive Morris, Jamaican-born communist active in London.
- Henry Gunter, Jamaican-born communist leader active in Birmingham, England.
- George Powe, Jamaican-born communist and WWII RAF personnel, active in both the UK Labour Party and the Communist Party of Great Britain (CPGB).
- Peter Blackman, Caribbean communist writer active in London and member of the CPGB.
- Charlie Hutchison, English communist and the only Black-British person to have fought in the Spanish Civil War.
- David Ivon Jones, Welsh communist, CPGB activist, and co-founder of the South African Communist Party.
