= Liberation (organisation) =

Anti-colonial pressure group, founded 1954 in the UK

- Formation: 1954; 72 years ago
- Location: United Kingdom
- Website: liberationorg.co.uk
- Formerly called: Movement for Colonial Freedom

Liberation (founded as the Movement for Colonial Freedom) is a political civil rights advocacy group founded in the United Kingdom in 1954. It had the support of many Members of Parliament, including Harold Wilson, Barbara Castle and Tony Benn, and celebrities such as Benjamin Britten.

== Context ==
In 1945, one-fifth of the world was still under British sovereignty and 780 million people throughout the world lived under European colonialism.

The Labour Government did not support independence and their general election manifesto gave no commitment to introduce bills to provide for self-government, except for India. The Foreign Secretary, Ernest Bevin, justified this by saying that the loss of the colonies would mean falling living standards for British people. Continued colonial rule was in contradiction to the Atlantic Charter, agreed between the UK and USA to provide a blueprint for the world after World War II, and which stated that "All peoples have a right to self-determination".

In Malaya, Chinese Communist insurgents were in conflict with British security forces in a war known as the Malayan Emergency. Fenner Brockway played an active role in convening a conference of anti-colonialists, representatives of nationalist and independence movements and black organisations such as the League of Coloured Peoples in 1947. Offices were set up in Paris and London and in 1948 the Congress of Peoples Against Imperialism was established.

With the outbreak of wars against French rule in North Africa, the Paris office of the League of Coloured Peoples was closed. India had its independence in 1947, with Ceylon and Burma both winning theirs in 1948. In Africa, however, independence organisations, such as the Mau Mau, were established and solidarity was called for.

== History ==
The Movement for Colonial Freedom was founded in 1954. The Labour Party's official position was not to support independence leaders. This however was not universally accepted and 70 MPs, including Harold Wilson and Barbara Castle, supported the Movement for Colonial Freedom. It also had backing among celebrities such as Benjamin Britten and in the universities. Fenner Brockway was the chairman, Douglas Rogers the secretary and Tony Benn the treasurer.

The movement had a lot of support among the rank and file of the Labour Party and trades union movement and waged a high-profile campaign, drafting more than 1500 parliamentary questions.

Press cuttings from Kenya proved that prisoners in the independence movement had been beaten to death at Hola Camp and Barbara Castle succeeded in getting this confirmed in the House of Commons. In 1963, Kenya was declared an independent republic, with Jomo Kenyatta as its first prime minister and then president.

The organisation established a Suez Emergency Committee in 1956 in response to the Suez Crisis, which was then taken over by the Labour Party who organised a demonstration against the British invasion of Egypt that November.

The Movement campaigned for freedom for the Portuguese colonies in Africa, for peace in Vietnam, supported Fidel Castro in the Cuban revolution and opposed the seizure of power by the Ba’ath regime in Iraq and the associated reign of terror against its opponents. The organisation was divided on the question of Israel.

In 1962, the MCF organised a demonstration in Trafalgar Square against the UK Colour Bar Immigration Bill which restricted the right of Commonwealth citizens to remain in Britain. Notable attendees included Mr Qureshi, secretary of the Pakistani Welfare Association, Ratta Singh, president of the Indian Workers Association, and Claudia Jones, editor of the West Indian Gazette.

The organisation opposed Enoch Powell’s "rivers of blood speech" in 1968 and also campaigned against neo-colonialism after independence, and opposed military take-overs in Africa, Asia and Latin America, such as the Pinochet coup in 1973.

In 1970, the Movement was renamed Liberation.

== Liberation journal ==
The organisation publishes a quarterly journal, Liberation. It is edited by Jamshid Ahmadi. It is currently distributed as a supplement of the Morning Star newspaper as well as available on a subscription basis.

== Archives ==
The archives of the Movement for Colonial Freedom are maintained by the School of Oriental and African Studies, London (SOAS).

== See also ==
- Peace News - had a joint publication
- Fenner Brockway - Former chairman
- Billy Strachan - a founding member of the Movement for Colonial Freedom
