= Cuadrilla =

Cuadrilla may refer to:

- A group of friends in Basque culture
- A company of people participating in a Spanish festival
- One of the four divisions of the Mesta sheep owners council
- An armed party of the Santa Hermandad
- The bullfighting team of a matador and his banderilleros and picadors
- A territorial division of Álava
- La Cuadrilla, a group of Spanish cinema directors
- Cuadrilla Resources, a British drilling and fracking company

== See also ==
- Quadrille
- Cadre (disambiguation)
