= Ranji Chandisingh =

Political leader in Guyana (1930–2009)

Vice President of Guyana
- In office 1984–1992
- President: Forbes Burnham

Personal details
- Born: Ranji Chandisingh; 5 January 1930 San Fernando, Trinidad and Tobago
- Died: 15 June 2009 (aged 79) Cummingsburg, Georgetown, Guyana
- Party: People's National Congress (1976-d)
- Other political affiliations: People's Progressive Party (formerly); British Communist Party (formerly)
- Education: Harvard University (BA)

Ranji Chandisingh (5 January 1930 – 15 June 2009) was a political leader in Guyana. He was the son of Dr. Charles Washington Chandisingh and Amelia Chandisingh. Chandisingh is survived by his wife Veronica and son Yuri.

== Education and early occupations ==
Ranji Chandisingh attended Buxton Methodist School on the East Coast Demerara (ECD) and the Modern High School at Robb Street in Georgetown, Guyana. In 1946, at the age of 16, he went to Harvard University to pursue a degree in medicine, but switched to social science, graduating with a BA in 1949. Chandisingh became an editor in the United Kingdom for monthly newspaper Caribbean News. On his return to Guyana in the early 1960s, he joined the People's Progressive Party (PPP) and took editorship of its newspaper, Thunder. Chandisingh was Director of Studies of the ideological institute, Macabre College, the PPP's official college at Success Village, ECD, and then at Land of Canaan Village, East Bank of Demerara, Guyana.

In 1952, Chandisingh became the editor of Caribbean News, one of the first black newspapers in Britain. The newspaper was founded by Billy Strachan, who would work closely alongside Chandisingh and often contribute to the newspaper.

In 1976, Chandisingh chose to leave the PPP to join the People's National Congress (PNC) party, also becoming Director of Studies of the Cuffy Ideological Institute at Loo Creek, Soesdyke–Linden Highway, Guyana. The reason for this change remains speculative. One reason given is that Chandisingh was not comfortable with the slow and diverse path the PPP was taking towards the goals of Marxism and Leninism, the philosophy he most cherished. The PNC government was then a declared socialist party and seemed to him the best party at the time to unify Guyana. Another reason is that Chandisingh was not comfortable following the orders of the PPP's leaders—he was recently married and took to drinking.

== Political affiliation ==
- British Communist Party (? – early 1960s)
- PPP (early 1960s – 1976)
- PNC (1976—?)

== Parliamentary experience ==
From 1961 to 1964 Chandisingh was the Minister of Labour, Health and Housing in British Guiana. In 1960, he introduced the Labour Relation Bill in Parliament. He also initiated changes in education reform.

In 1976, Chandisingh defected to PNC. In January 1980, Chandisingh was made Minister of Higher Education. In 1981, his responsibilities were expanded as Minister of Education, Social Development and Culture.

In 1984, he was made General Secretary of the PNC.

In 1984, Chandisingh was made one of the Vice Presidents and First Deputy Prime Minister. He was later also appointed Ambassador to Moscow. He held the position of Vice President until the PNC lost the 1992 elections.

From 1989 to 1991, Chandisingh was Guyana's Ambassador to the former Soviet Union.
