= Trevor Carter =

Trinidadian-British community activist (1930–2008)

- Born: Trevor Clarence Carter; 9 October 1930; Woodbrook, Port of Spain, British Trinidad
- Died: March 2008 (aged 77); Archway, London, England
- Occupations: Educator; government official
- Organizations: Young Communist League; Black Theatre Co-operativeWar on Want
- Known for: Civil rights, equal opportunity and education activism
- Notable work: Shattering Illusions: West Indians in British Politics (1986)
- Political party: CPGB (until 1991); Labour (1990s)
- Spouse: Corinne Skinner-Carter (m. 1955)
- Relatives: Claudia Jones (cousin)
- Honours: Recommended by the education authority for an OBE for his role in the Swann Report (rejected by Carter)

Trevor Carter (9 October 1930 – March 2008) was a British communist party leader, educator, black civil rights activist, and co-founder of the Caribbean Teachers Association. He served as the head of equal opportunities for the Inner London Education Authority. He co-authored the 1986 book Shattering Illusions: West Indians in British Politics.

Writers on British socialist movements have described Carter as "one of the Communist Party of Great Britain's (CPGB) most important black members" from the mid-1950s until 1991. Carter was a communist activist, and a member of the CPGB from his arrival in Britain in 1954 until the party was dissolved in 1991. Cheddi Jagan invited Carter to British Guiana to work in education.

Carter was the stage manager of the first British-Caribbean Carnival, held in St Pancras Town Hall, and later a Trustee of the Notting Hill Carnival Trust. Together his cousin Claudia Jones, and wife, the EastEnders actress Corinne Skinner-Carter, they helped establish the second-largest annual carnival in the world, London's Notting Hill Carnival.

== Early life ==
Trevor Clarence Carter was born in Woodbrook, Port of Spain, in the British colony of Trinidad, on 9 October 1930, the eldest of 12 children of housewife Elene Carter, and her husband, cabinet maker Clarence Carter. His views and political beliefs were heavily influenced by some of his teachers who were Marxists, and by his father who was a trade unionist, the combination of which made a strong impression on Carter. Sometime during his childhood, he met a girl called Corinne, whom he married later in life.

At the age of 14, Carter left school and worked as a mess boy on a merchant ship; during this time he travelled to New Orleans where he observed segregation. Carter's "experiences in New Orleans at the height of racial segregation engendered a lifelong battle to improve race relations" according to Carter's obituary, and made him vow to never live in the United States according to Graham Stevenson, a British trade union leader.

=== Arrival in Britain ===
After travelling through various parts of the U.S., Carter moved to Britain to study architecture at Regent Street Polytechnic. In 1954 he arrived in London as a member of the Windrush generation. According to Paul Okojie of Manchester Polytechnic in a 1987 book review published in Race & Class, Carter described London during that period in his 1986 book, Shattering Illusions: West Indians in British Politics as "traumatic", and a place "which rejected, insulted, devalued and discriminated against" West Indians, where they "encountered humiliation and had to learn to survive within a system of economic, political and cultural subordination", writing that the work they could find was "invariably unskilled manual work" with long hours for little pay.

In Britain, Carter lived for several years with fellow Caribbean communist activist Billy Strachan, alongside Strachan's family. Carter described Strachan as his mentor. Both Strachan and Carter would play a small role in assisting Claudia Jones in creating the West Indian Gazette (1958–1965). Later in life, Carter recalled the Strachan family fondly, saying that he felt "a true affection in the Strachan family".

=== Early activism ===
Soon after arriving in Britain, Carter joined the Young Communist League (YCL), and later, the Communist Party of Great Britain (CPGB). He was also active in the Caribbean Labor Congress (CLC), which historian Bill Schwarz suggests operated independently of the Communist Party, despite being proscribed by the Labour Party and TUC as a "Communist front".

According to Okojie, Carter says that the trade unions "refused to align with black people in their struggles against racial oppression", and quotes Carter as writing, "a clearer vision of our common good, which must be socialism, would help us to rescue black people from the margins of political activity". Evan Smith cites page 62 of Carter's book in a 2008 Science & Society article to state that, during the 1950s, the Communist Party recruited Carter, Strachan and other black members but that, "for Carter, the 'stubborn class-before-race position of the Party during the fifties and sixties cost the Party dearly in terms of its [black] members'." A 2019 article by Geoff Brown in International Socialism cites page 140 of Shattering Illusions where Carter says that his impression "was always that the left was genuinely concerned to mobilise the black community, but into their political battles", but because the left "never had time to look at our immediate problems ... blacks ended up in total isolation within the broad left because of the left's basic dishonesty." A 2010 article in Lalkar magazine cites page 62 of Shattering Illusions, stating that Carter thought racism not an "inherent and permanent feature" of the left, and that he "stayed in the Communist Party" believing "comrades could learn and change their attitudes". He adds that, "I don't think the party is dealing properly with racism and sometimes I get angry ... The Labour Party occasionally has enticed me, but I know that my political education couldn't improve anywhere but in the Communist Party."

Carter greeted his cousin, Claudia Jones, when she arrived in the UK after being deported from the US in November 1955. Carter admired Jones for her understanding of racial and class issues. On New Year's Eve 1955, Carter married Corinne Skinner at Christ Church, Hampstead. The Carters moved to live in Hampstead.

During his work for the CPGB and YCL, Carter travelled to both Moscow and Cuba, and met Fidel Castro in Moscow.

== Role in the creation of Notting Hill Carnival ==
In the aftermath of the Notting Hill race riots, and the 1959 murder of Kelso Cochrane by white youths, Carter, Corinne Skinner-Carter and Claudia Jones were among a committee that sought to create a carnival to bring the London Caribbean community together. Their plans came to fruition on 30 January 1959, and Carter worked as the stage manager of the first British-Caribbean Carnival, held in St Pancras Town Hall. This event was the precursor to the Notting Hill Carnival, which would become one of the largest annual carnivals in the world. Carter continued to support and promote the Notting Hill Carnival, becoming involved in the annual celebrations for the remainder of his life. At one point, he also served as a member of the Notting Hill Carnival Trust.

== Work in British Guiana ==
Cheddi Jagan invited Carter to travel to British Guiana, where Carter worked from 1963 to 1966 as a school teacher with the People's Progressive Party, founded by Jagan. During his time in Guiana, the political situation became unstable and he returned to Britain.

== Educationalist career and later work ==
Upon returning to Britain from Guyana in 1966, Carter enrolled at the College of North West London (then Kilburn Polytechnic) and began studying A-level physiology, sociology, and economics. During the nights he worked for a telephone exchange in Covent Garden. Completing his courses, he enrolled at the University of North London (then Polytechnic of North London) in 1968.

Sometime during the 1970s, Carter worked with The Mangrove restaurant, where a group of other activists known as "the Mangrove Nine" met.

After graduation, Carter became a qualified British teacher and began working at Brooke House secondary school in Lower Clapton, Hackney, and later became the school's head of the social studies department. Alongside other black activists, Carter became one of the founding members of the Caribbean Teachers Association, which led him to become involved in the Rampton Report, which found that the British educational system had been failing black students. He contributed to another government educational reform white paper called the Swann Report as a member of Lord Swann's committee, work for which he was recommended to receive the Member of the Most Excellent Order of the British Empire (MBE) by the educational authority. Carter rejected the award, citing his communist beliefs. Carter acknowledged that some black individuals said the Swann Report was racist, but he "consider[ed] this view to be misguided"; he didn't agree with the Swann Report, but considered it constructive. In 1987, he wrote a chapter discussing the Swann Report for a CPGB publication titled Racism and schools: contributions to a discussion.

He joined the Inner London Education Authority as a Senior Education Liaison Officer, before being made their Head of Equal Opportunities. He was the chairman of the Hackney Community Relations Enterprise, and co-founder of both the Caribbean Teachers Organisation and the Black Theatre Co-operative. He also volunteered for War on Want.

In 1987, Carter was elected to the central committee of the CPGB at the 40th Congress of the party. After the CPGB dissolved in 1991, Carter joined the Labour Party and ran as a council candidate for Labour in Islington.

=== Author ===
With co-author Jean Coussins, Carter wrote Shattering Illusions: West Indians in British Politics in 1986, a book which Stevenson says provided "a social and political commentary on the interface between Caribbean migrants and British society and politics from the Post War period up until the early 1980s". Published by the left-wing press Lawrence & Wishart, Shattering Illusions was reviewed by Paul Okojie, who described it as being of "both historical and contemporary import" for its criticism of white racism. The book was described by Ellis Cashmore as an "insightful analysis of African-Caribbeans in Britain since the 1950s" that "looks at the emergence of black resistance to British racism".

== Later life and death ==
In 1998, Carter was interviewed for a documentary about Paul Robeson entitled Paul Robeson: Here I Stand.

Carter died in early March 2008 at his home in Archway, London. His funeral was held on 18 March 2008, at St Augustine's Church, Highgate, with a eulogy titled "A Life with Purpose" being delivered by Professor Gus John. Jeremy Corbyn described him as a "hope and inspiration to many who were suffering appalling racism and discrimination as newly arrived workers from the West Indies".

In September 2009, at a ceremony organised by family and friends, a teak bench was dedicated to Carter's memory in Waterlow Park, Highgate.

== See also ==
- Dorothy Kuya
- Charlie Hutchison
- Len Johnson
- Henry Gunter
- Peter Blackman

== External source ==
- Trevor Carter interview in Paul Robeson: Here I Stand (PBS.org)

`
