= National Assembly of Women =

The National Assembly of Women (NAW) is a British women's rights organisation founded on 8 March 1952, at a meeting of almost 1,500 women from all across Great Britain. It campaigns for equal status for women and men in all aspects of life and also for peace and an end to poverty worldwide. It is affiliated to the Women's International Democratic Federation.

== History ==
The National Assembly of Women was a product of the involvement of Women in World War II; as a result of their extensive work to fill jobs previously undertaken by men, women were left with changed expectations for their role in the world, including dreams for full-time employment and equal pay. Following Winston Churchill's 1946 speech heralding the onset of the Cold War, women became more and more aware that there was no existing space for their concerns and response to political events. Campaigns across Britain by the International Women's Day Committee led to an Inaugural Meeting of the National Assembly of Women at St. Pancras Town Hall in London on 8 March 1952, with 1,396 delegates from Wales, Scotland, Tee-side, Bradford, Halifax, Leeds, Lancashire and Yorkshire. These delegates represented a total of 549,700 women from women's organisations and guilds. Four delegates from the Soviet Union who had planned to attend were refused visas by Sir David Maxwell Fyfe, Home Secretary, and two women from Italy were denied entry to the country when they reached Dover.

Women who gathered at the initial meeting were united against the Korean War, against the rise of cost-of-living, and for peace, disarmament, and an increase in women in parliament. The women passed a resolution to highlight that women's labor was still being exploited 30 years after support for the principle of equal pay. Monica Felton chaired the meeting, and Charlotte Marsh gave a speech.

== Meetings ==
A second Assembly was held in 1953, and then women came together for a 1955 National Assembly in which they took part in a 17,000 person demonstration against German re-armament.

In 1975, the National Assembly of Women collaborated with the Women's International Democratic Federation to host a global seminar in London, with representatives from Eastern and Western Europe as well as South Africa.

The Assembly holds Biennial General Meetings to elect Officers and Executives, who are responsible for the work of the organisation and meet every two months.

== Organising work ==
Considered by some to be a communist-affiliated organisation, members of the National Assembly of Women primary advocated for peace and peace-related causes; they also fought for better education, health care, pensions, and childcare. They supported the Lamaze progressive birthing technique. In 1975, they submitted opinions on the Equal Pay Act and Employment Protection Act to the government. In 1987, the National Assembly of Women took 102 delegates to the Congress in Moscow; the Assembly was responsible for distributing invitations to British women for the Moscow Congress, and invited a few members of the Greenham Common Women's Peace Camp. The National Assembly of women was also known to have enjoyed close contacts with the London branch of the Caribbean Labour Congress led by Billy Strachan.

The organisation publishes a quarterly journal, SISTERS (Sisters In Solidarity to End Racism and Sexism).

== Location ==
Its headquarters were originally at 283 Gray's Inn Road, London, but are now in Cullercoats, Tyne and Wear.

== See also ==
- Betty Tebbs
- Dorothy Kuya
