= Claudia Jones =

Trinidad-born journalist and activist (1915–1964)

- Jones in 1948
- Born: Claudia Vera Cumberbatch; 21 February 1915; Belmont, Port of Spain, Trinidad and Tobago
- Died: 24 December 1964 (aged 49); London, England
- Resting place: Highgate Cemetery
- Other name: Claudia Cumberbatch Jones
- Occupations: Journalist and activist
- Years active: 1936–1964
- Known for: Organiser of 1959 Caribbean carnival event, precursor of the Notting Hill Carnival. Founder of West Indian Gazette, Britain's first major Black community newspaper. Communist activism.
- Political party: Communist Party USA, Communist Party of Great Britain (CPGB)
- Criminal charges: Charged under the McCarran Act
- Criminal penalty: Imprisonment and eventual deportation to the United Kingdom
- Relatives: Trevor Carter (cousin)

Claudia Vera Jones (née Cumberbatch; 21 February 1915 – 24 December 1964) was a Trinidad and Tobago-born journalist and activist. As a child, she migrated with her family to the United States, where she became a Communist political activist, feminist and Black nationalist, adopting the name Jones as "self-protective disinformation". Due to the political persecution of Communists in the US, she was deported in 1955 and subsequently lived in the United Kingdom. Upon arriving in the UK, she immediately joined the Communist Party of Great Britain and would remain a member for the rest of her life. In 1958, she founded Britain's first major Black newspaper, the West Indian Gazette (1958–1965), and from 1959 she organised a series of indoor Caribbean carnivals that have been cited as an influence on what became the Notting Hill Carnival, the second-largest annual carnival in the world.

== Early life ==
Claudia Vera Cumberbatch was born in Belmont, Port of Spain in Trinidad, which was then a colony of the British Empire, on 21 February 1915. When she was eight years old, her family emigrated to New York City following the post-war cocoa price crash in Trinidad. Her mother died five years later, and her father eventually found work to support the family. Jones won the Theodore Roosevelt Award for Good Citizenship at her junior high school. In 1932, due to poor living conditions in Harlem, she was struck with tuberculosis at the age of 17. The disease caused irreparable damage to her lungs leading to lengthy stays in hospitals throughout her life. She graduated from Wadleigh High School, despite leaving for a year due to convalescence.

== United States career ==
Despite Jones being academically bright, being classed as an immigrant woman severely limited her career choices. Instead of going to college, she began working in a laundry, and subsequently found other retail work in Harlem. During this time, she joined a drama group, and began to write a weekly column called "Claudia Comments" for a Black nationalist newspaper in Harlem, with a circulation of about 4,000–5,000 readers. She discovered that the editor had passed her writing off as his own, and she became "critical of the newspaper and its leadership".

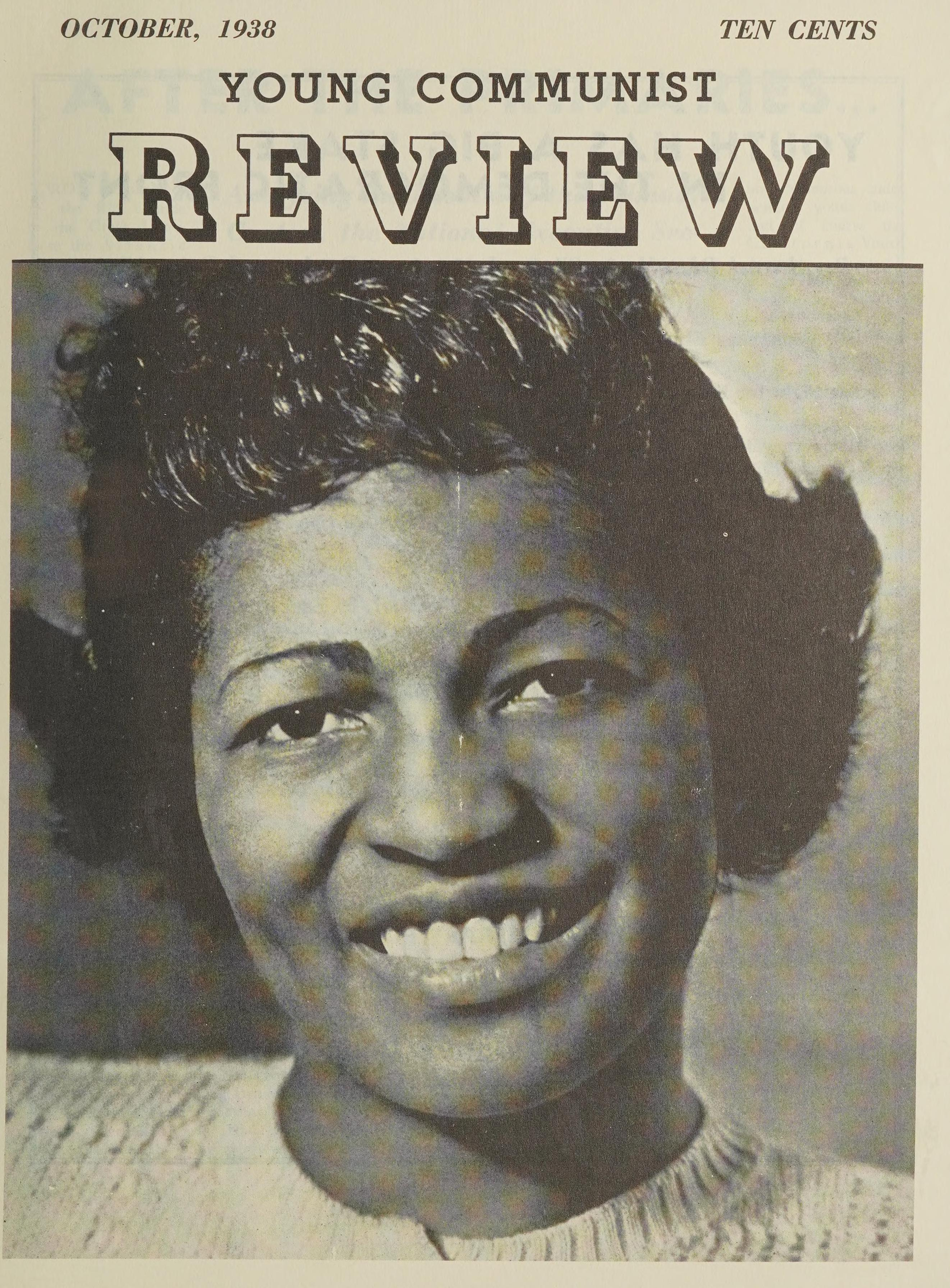
Jones on the cover of the Young Communist Review, October 1938

In 1936, after hearing the Communist Party's defence of the Scottsboro Boys and witnessing the American Communist movement's opposition to the Italian invasion of Ethiopia, she joined the Young Communist League USA (YCL). She went on to work on the YCL newspaper, the Weekly Review—first as a writer, and then as an associate editor, editor, and ultimately editor-in-chief. One of her earliest articles at the Weekly Review was a review of Richard Wright's 1940 novel Native Son. Among frequent article topics were prominent Black figures such as athletes, and calls to end Jim Crow. She wrote multiple weekly columns, including "Quiz"—answering frequently asked questions—and "The Political Score", covering current political events. Her writing during these years is described as aligning closely with official party positions, in contrast with her more individually developed stances later in her life. It has also been described as taking a Black nationalist angle and emphasizing racial issues.

She also later became state education director and chairperson for the YCL. She represented the YCL at the Second World Youth Congress at Vassar College.

After the Young Communist League USA became American Youth for Democracy during World War II, Jones became editor of its monthly journal, Spotlight. After the war, Jones became executive secretary of the Women's National Commission and secretary for the Women's Commission of the Communist Party USA (CPUSA). Her work in the CPUSA Women's Commission included giving lectures and organizing women's chapters of the party. In 1952, she took the same position at the National Peace Council. In 1953, she took over the editorship of Negro Affairs.

=== Black feminist leader in the Communist Party ===
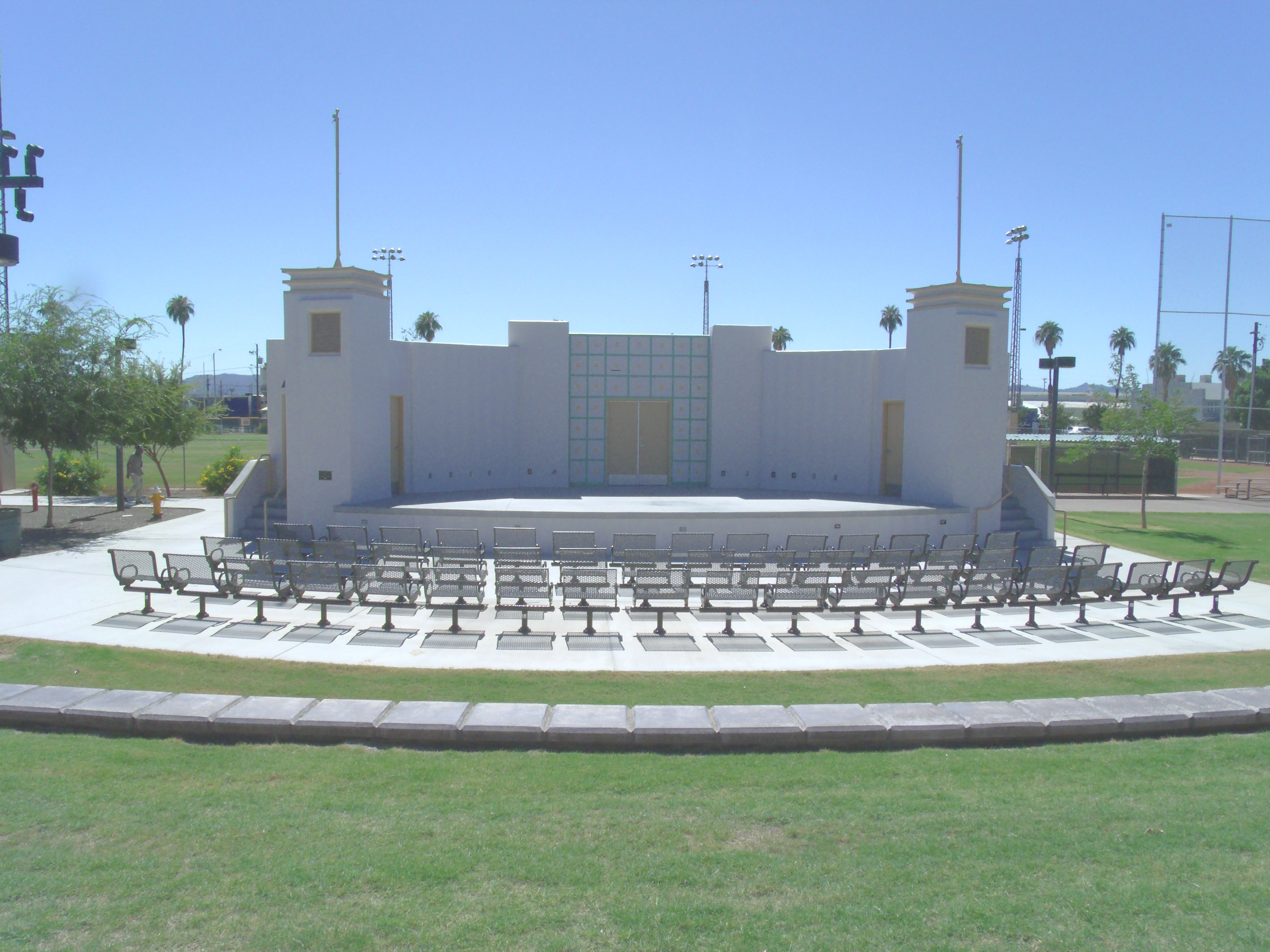
Bandshell in Eastlake Park in Phoenix, Arizona, where in 1948 Jones spoke to a crowd of 1,000 people about equal rights for African Americans.

As a member of the Communist Party USA and a Black nationalist and feminist, Jones made her main focus the creation of "an anti-imperialist coalition, managed by working-class leadership, fueled by the involvement of women."

Jones focused on growing the party's support for Black and white women. Not only did she work towards getting Black women equal respect within the party. Jones also worked for getting Black women, specifically, respect in being a mother, worker, and woman. She campaigned for job training programs, equal pay for equal work, government controls on food prices, and funding for wartime childcare programs. Jones supported a subcommittee to address the "women's question". She insisted on the development in the party of theoretical training of women comrades, the organisation of women into mass organisations, daytime classes for women, and "babysitter" funds to allow for women's activism.

=== "An End to the Neglect of the Problems of the Negro Woman!" (1949) ===
Jones's best-known work, "An End to the Neglect of the Problems of the Negro Woman!", published in 1949 in the magazine Political Affairs, exhibits her development of what later came to be termed "intersectional" analysis within a Marxist framework. In the article, Jones theorized a "layered" oppression faced by Black women due to race, gender, and economic status, concluding that advocacy for Black women was integral to the broader fight for social justice.

Building on Marx's theory of exploitation, Jones introduces the concept of "super-exploitation" of women, particularly Black women, who she describes as "the most oppressed stratum in the United States". In the article, she concludes that Black women are systematically pushed out of most productive industries and confined to low-paying (mainly domestic) employment, using income statistics from northeastern American cities evidencing the racial pay gap. According to Jones' analysis, the income disparity, compounded by other exploitative practices like high rents, further increased economic burdens on Black women and contributed to pervasive social and health issues among Black people, such as high maternal and infant mortality rates. Jones also makes a feminist argument against the exploitation of marginally employed Black women by their husbands, arguing that misogynistic dynamics within Black families allowed Black men to feel greater agency in a racist society. Simultaneously, she argues for the importance of Black women within their families will necessarily increase their militancy.

The intensified oppression of the Negro people, which has been the hallmark of the postwar reactionary offensive, cannot therefore but lead to an acceleration of the militancy of the Negro woman. As mother, as Negro, and as worker, the Negro woman fights against the wiping out of the Negro family, against the Jim Crow ghetto existence which destroys the health, morale, and very life of millions of her sisters, brothers, and children.

A section of the article is devoted to the continuous damage incurred by white chauvinist ideology, embodied in southern lynchings and what she terms "legal lynchings" in the north. Ingram also criticizes her fellow progressives for ingrown racism, noting the exclusion of Black women by white and Black party cadres and moves by white communist families to stymie integration between the black and white youth. Ingram concludes that the struggle for Black women's liberation is instrumental to the partnership of the Black and white working classes for equality and the defeat of "Wall Street imperialism". She notes the development of domestic workers unions and the then-contemporary case of Rosa Lee Ingram as urgent areas for development on the issue of Black women's rights.

The article was widely read and increased Jones' profile within CPUSA, bringing women's rights to the forefront of the party's activism. Widely regarded as a landmark text within the tradition of Black feminism, one scholar has gone as far as to identify it as the origin of cohesive Black feminist thought.

== Deportation ==
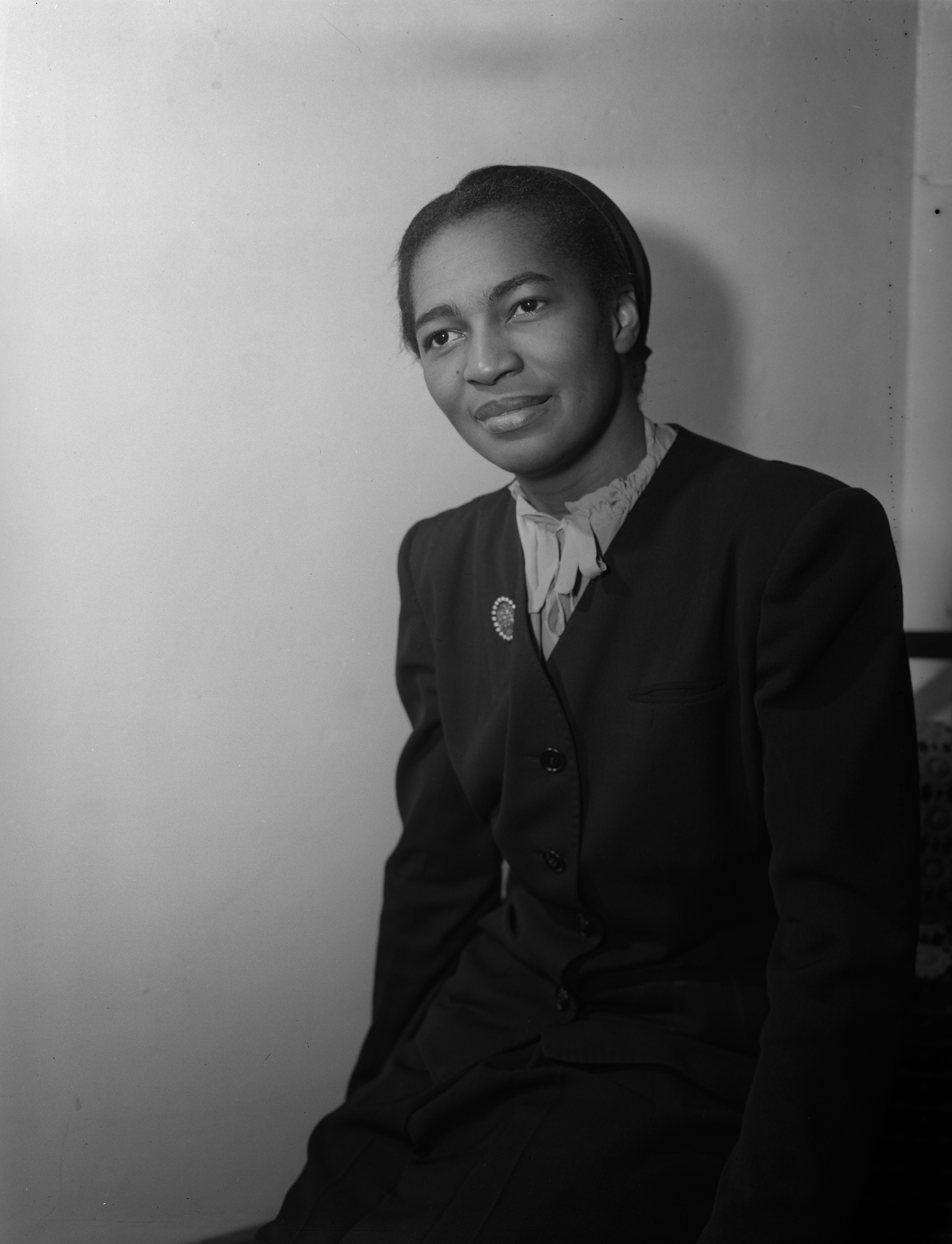
Jones in 1946

An elected member of the National Committee of the Communist Party USA, Jones also organised and spoke at events. As a result of her membership of CPUSA and various associated activities, in 1948 she was arrested and sentenced to the first of four spells in prison. Incarcerated on Ellis Island, she was threatened with deportation to Trinidad.

Following a hearing by the Immigration and Naturalization Service, she was found in violation of the McCarran Act for being an alien (non-US citizen) who had joined the Communist Party. Several witnesses testified to her role in party activities, and she had identified herself as a party member since 1936 when completing her Alien Registration on 24 December 1940, in conformity with the Alien Registration Act. She was ordered to be deported on 21 December 1950.

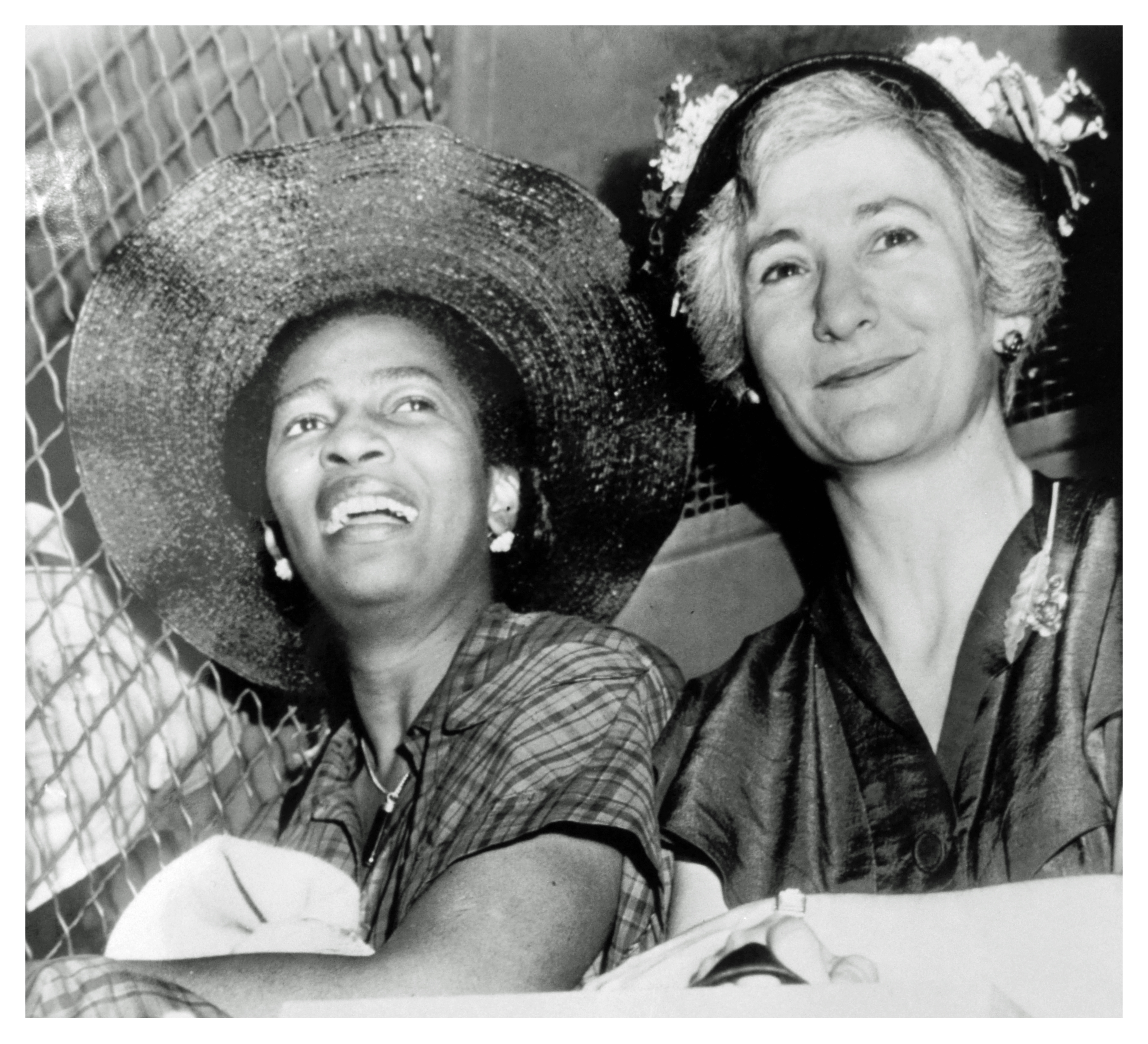
Jones and Betty Gannett in a police wagon in New York City after their bail was revoked, July 17, 1951

In 1951, aged 36 and in prison, she suffered her first heart attack. That same year, she was tried and convicted with 11 others, including her friend Elizabeth Gurley Flynn, of "un-American activities" under the Smith Act, specifically activities against the United States government. The charges against Jones related to an article she had written for the magazine Political Affairs under the title "Women in the Struggle for Peace and Security". The Supreme Court refused to hear their appeal. In 1955, Jones began her sentence of a year and a day at the Federal Reformatory for Women at Alderson, West Virginia. She was released on 23 October 1955.

She was refused entry to Trinidad and Tobago, in part because the colonial governor Major General Sir Hubert Elvin Rance was of the opinion that "she may prove troublesome". She was eventually offered residency in the United Kingdom on humanitarian grounds, and federal authorities agreed to allow it when she agreed to cease contesting her deportation. On 7 December 1955, at Harlem's Hotel Theresa, 350 people gathered to see her off.

== United Kingdom activism ==
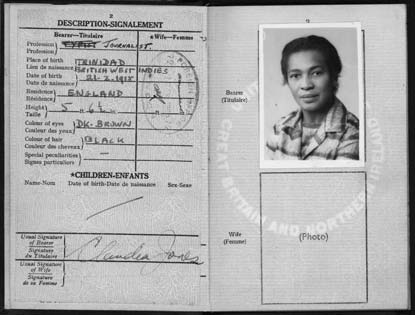
Jones's British passport

Jones arrived in London two weeks later, at a time when the British African-Caribbean community was expanding. Upon her arrival, the Communist Party of Great Britain (CPGB) sent several Caribbean communists to greet her. These communist activists included Billy Strachan, Winston Pinder, and Jones's cousin Trevor Carter. However, on engaging the political community in the UK, she was disappointed to find that many British communists were hostile to a Black woman. She immediately joined the CPGB upon her arrival in Britain and remained a member until her death.

=== Activism ===
Jones found a community that needed active organisation. She became involved in the British African-Caribbean community to organise both access to basic facilities, as well as the early movement for equal rights.

Supported by her cousin Trevor Carter, and her friends Nadia Cattouse, Amy Ashwood, Beryl McBurnie, Pearl Prescod and her lifelong mentor Paul Robeson, Jones campaigned against racism in housing, education and employment. She addressed peace rallies and the Trades Union Congress, and visited Japan, Russia, and China, where she met with Mao Zedong.

In the early 1960s, her health failing, Jones helped organise campaigns against the Commonwealth Immigrants Bill (passed in April 1962), which would make it harder for non-whites to migrate to Britain. To this end, she founded the Conference of Afro-Asian-Caribbean Organisations (CAACO). She also campaigned for the release of Nelson Mandela, and spoke out against racism in the workplace.

=== West Indian Gazette and Afro-Asian Caribbean News, 1958 ===
From her experiences in the United States, Jones believed that "people without a voice were as lambs to the slaughter." In March 1958 above a barber's shop in Brixton, she founded and thereafter edited the West Indian Gazette, its full title subsequently displayed on its masthead as West Indian Gazette and Afro-Asian Caribbean News (WIG). The paper became a key contributor to the rise of consciousness within the Black British community.

Jones wrote in her last published essay, "The Caribbean Community in Britain", in Freedomways (Summer 1964):

The newspaper has served as a catalyst, quickening the awareness, socially and politically, of West Indians, Afro-Asians and their friends. Its editorial stand is for a united, independent West Indies, full economic, social and political equality and respect for human dignity for West Indians and Afro-Asians in Britain, and for peace and friendship between all Commonwealth and world peoples.

Always strapped for cash, WIG folded eight months and four editions after Jones's death in December 1964.

=== Notting Hill riots and "Caribbean Carnival", 1959 ===
In August 1958, four months after the launch of WIG, the Notting Hill race riots occurred, as well as similar earlier disturbances in Robin Hood Chase, Nottingham. In view of the racially driven analysis of these events by the existing daily newspapers, Jones began receiving visits from members of the Black British community and also from various national leaders responding to the concern of their citizens, including Cheddi Jagan of British Guiana, Norman Manley of Jamaica, Eric Williams of Trinidad and Tobago, as well as Phyllis Shand Allfrey and Carl La Corbinière of the West Indies Federation.

As a result, Claudia identified the need to "wash the taste of Notting Hill and Nottingham out of our mouths". It was suggested that the Black British community should have a carnival; it was December 1958, so the next question was: "In the winter?" Jones used her connections to gain use of St Pancras Town Hall in January 1959 for the first Mardi-Gras-based carnival, directed by Edric Connor (who in 1951 had arranged for the Trinidad All Steel Percussion Orchestra to appear at the Festival of Britain) and with the Boscoe Holder Dance Troupe, jazz guitarist Fitzroy Coleman and singer Cleo Laine headlining; the event was televised nationally by the BBC. These early celebrations were epitomised by the slogan: "A people's art is the genesis of their freedom."

A footnote on the front cover of the original 1959 souvenir brochure states: "A part of the proceeds [from the sale] of this brochure are to assist the payments of fines of coloured and white youths involved in the Notting Hill events." Jones and the West Indian Gazette also organised five other annual indoor Caribbean Carnival cabarets at such London venues as Seymour Hall, Porchester Hall and the Lyceum Ballroom, which events are seen as precursors of the celebration of Caribbean Carnival that culminated in the outdoor Notting Hill Carnival that began on the streets in the mid-1960s.

== Death ==
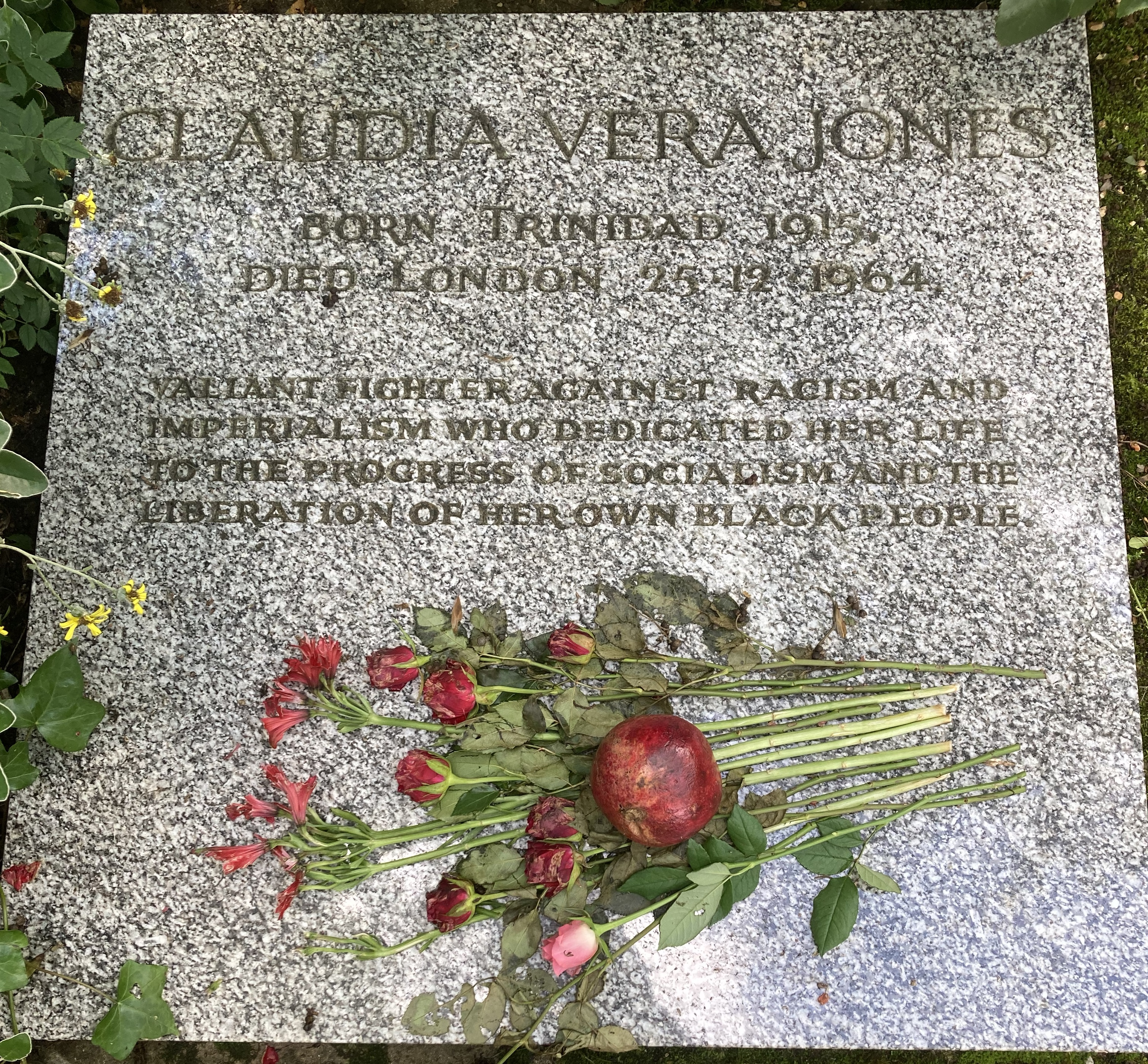
Grave of Jones in Highgate Cemetery

Jones died in London on Christmas Eve 1964, aged 49, and was found on Christmas Day at her flat. A post-mortem declared that she had suffered a massive heart attack, due to heart disease and tuberculosis.

Her funeral on 9 January 1965 was a large and political ceremony, with her burial plot selected to be that located to the left of the tomb of her hero, Karl Marx, in Highgate Cemetery, North London. A message from Paul Robeson was read out:

It was a great privilege to have known Claudia Jones. She was a vigorous and courageous leader of the Communist Party of the United States, and was very active in the work for the unity of white and coloured peoples and for dignity and equality especially for the Negro people and for women.

== Works ==
From 1950 to 1953, Jones contributed to the Daily Worker newspaper a regular column called "Half of the World", a title she used to assert the importance of women's rights, given their proportional numbers in the world.

Articles

- "Discussion Article", Political Affairs (August 1943)
- "For New Approaches to Our Work among Women", Political Affairs (August 1948)
- "Women Crusade for Peace," The Worker Magazine (1950)
- "100 Women's Delegates Back World Peace Plea", Daily Worker (1950)
- "International Women's Day and the Struggle for Peace", Political Affairs (March 1950)
- "Claudia Jones Writes from Ellis Island", Daily Worker (8 November 1950)
- "For the Unity of Women in the Case of Peace", Political Affairs (1951)
- "Warmakers Fear America's Women," Daily Worker (1951)
- "For the Unity of Women in the Cause of Peace!", Political Affairs (February 1951)
- "Foster's Political and Theoretical Guidance to Our Work among Women", Political Affairs (March 1951)
- "Call Negro Women to Sojourn for Justice", Daily Worker (20 September 1951)
- "Sojourners for Truth and Justice", The Worker Magazine (1952)
- "The Struggle for Peace in the United States", Political Affairs (1952)
- "Her Words Rang Out beyond the Walls of the Courthouse", Daily Worker (21 November 1952)
- "American Imperialism and the British West Indies", Political Affairs (April 1958)
- "The Caribbean Community in Britain", Freedomways (1964)
- "First Lady of the World: I Talk with Mme Sun Yat–Sen", West Indian Gazette and Afro-Asian Caribbean News (November 1964)
- "An End to the Neglect of the Problems of Negro Women, June 1949", Political Affairs (March 1974)

Book chapters

- "Claudia Jones," Communists Speak to the Court (1953)

Books

- Autobiographical History (6 December 1955 – unpublished)
- Claudia Jones: Beyond Containment: Autobiographical Reflections, Essays, and Poems (2011)

== Legacy and influence ==
=== Impact on Journalism ===
The National Union of Journalists' Black Members' Council holds a prestigious annual Claudia Jones Memorial Lecture every October, during Black History Month, to honour Jones and celebrate her contribution to Black-British journalism.

Many British communists have argued that her participation in the British communist movement has been both obscured and denied by organisations keen to use her image.

=== Cultural and Community Initiatives ===
The Claudia Jones Organization was founded in London in 1982 by Yvette Thomas and others to support and empower women and families of African-Caribbean heritage.

=== Feminist and Anti-Imperialist Legacy ===
In May 2008, Caribbean-American academic Carole Boyce Davies published Left of Karl Marx: The Political Life of Claudia Jones, detailing Jones' radical political organising, writing, and enduring legacy as Black feminist Marxist. The name of Davies' book is also a nod to the resting place of Jones, in London's Highgate Cemetery, where she is buried to the left of Karl Marx's grave.

Jones is named on the list of 100 Great Black Britons (2003 and 2020) and in the 2020 book.

=== Recognition and Memorials ===
==== Theatrical and Film Portrayals ====
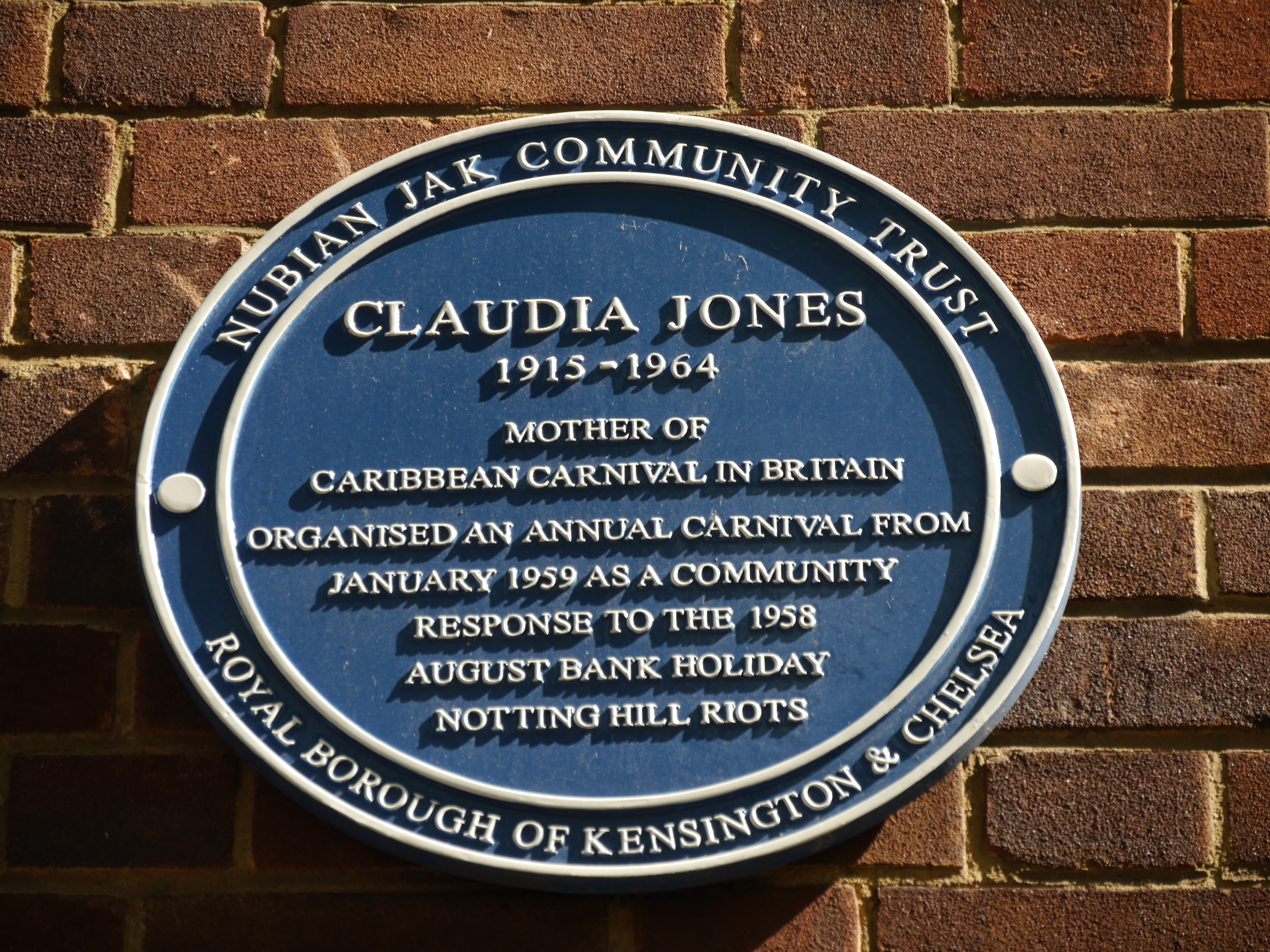
A blue plaque erected for Jones, Notting Hill

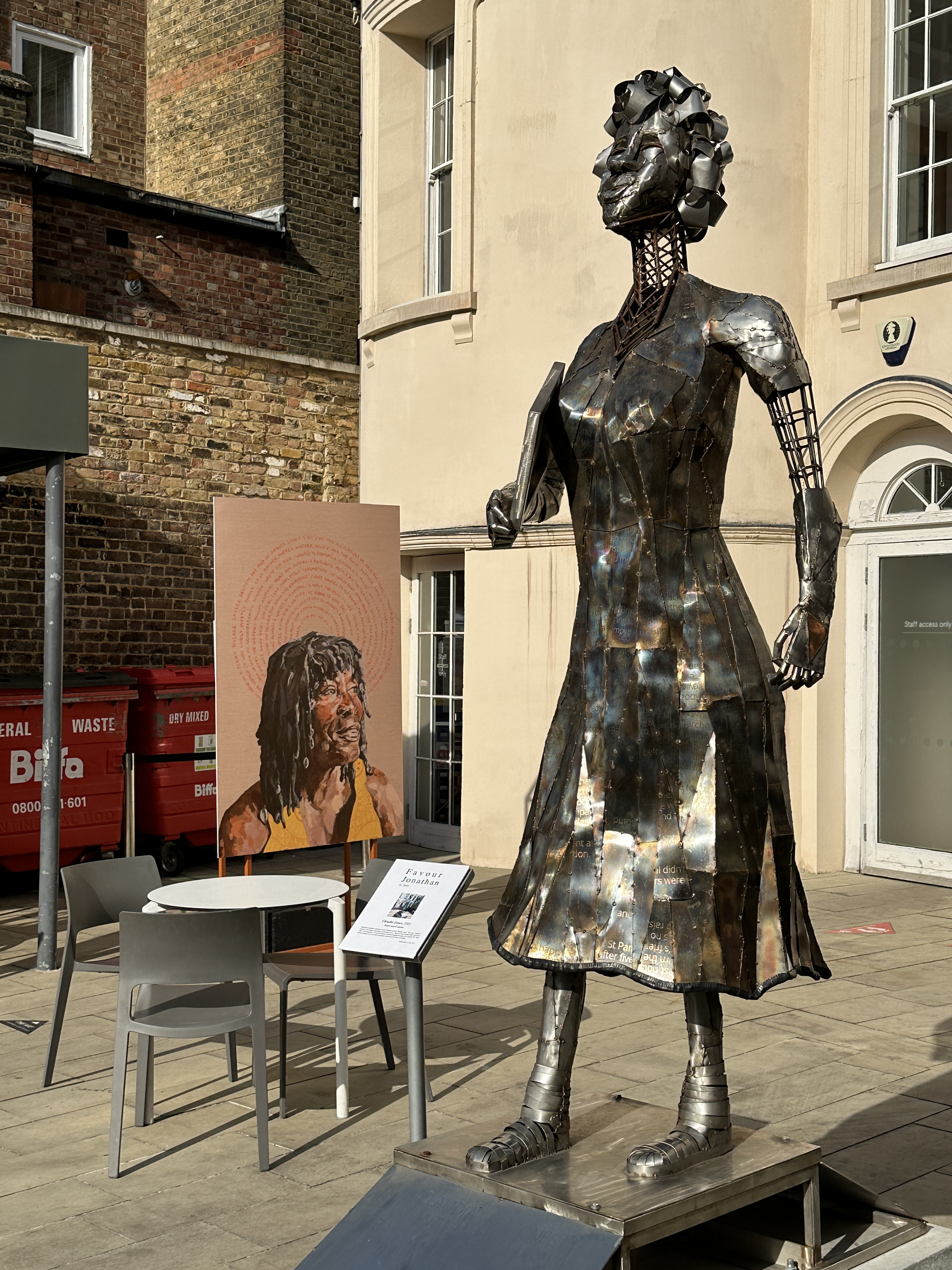
Claudia Jones by Favour Jonathan, Black Cultural Archives, Brixton

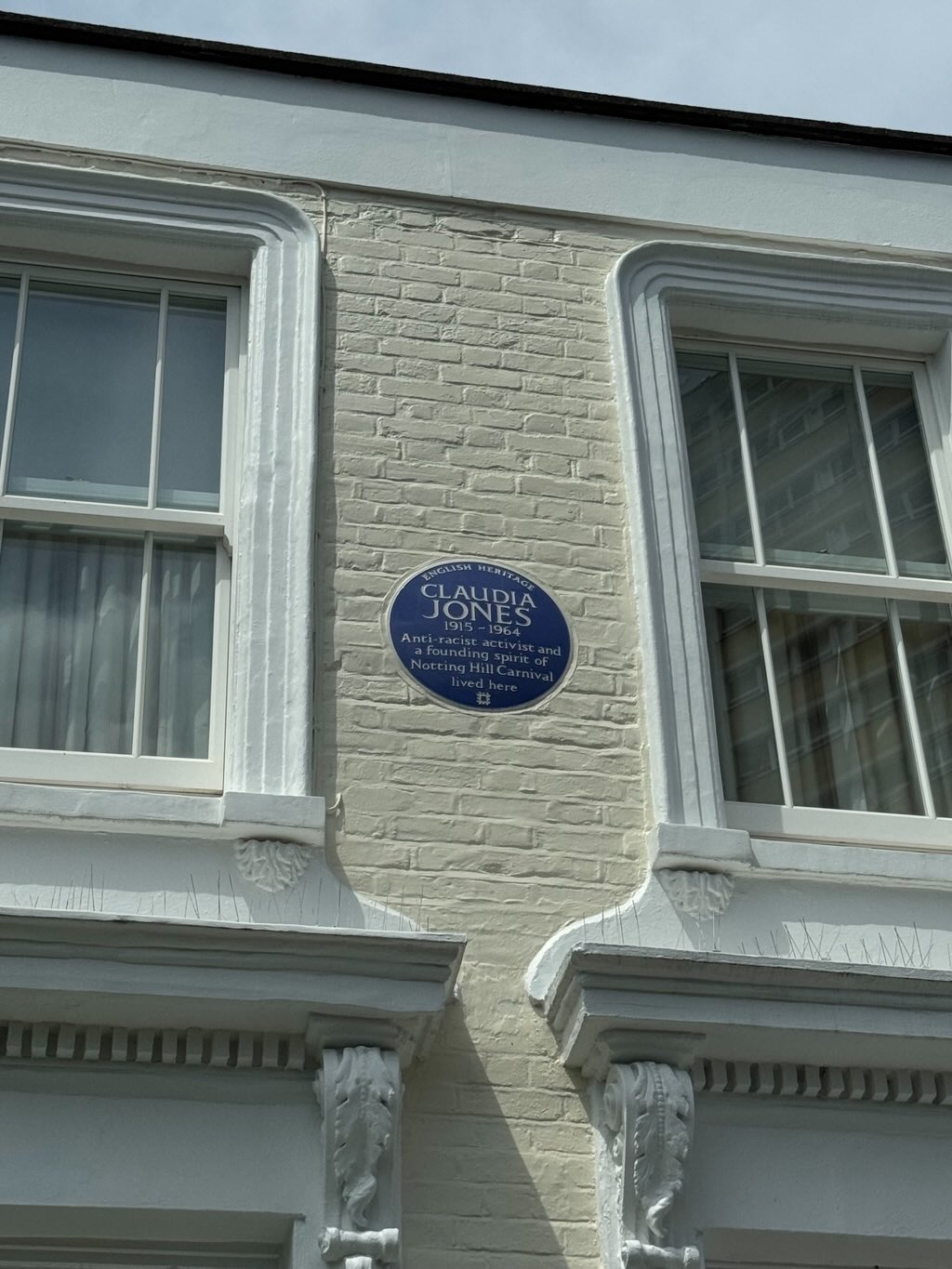
Plaque erected in 2023 by English Heritage at 6 Meadow Road, Vauxhall, Lambeth.

Winsome Pinnock's 1989 play A Rock in Water was inspired by the life of Claudia Jones.

Jones is the subject of a documentary film by Z. Nia Reynolds, Looking for Claudia Jones (2010).

Jones appeared as a prominent character in Yasmin Joseph's 2019 play J'Ouvert, which premiered at Theatre 503 before transferring to the Harold Pinter Theatre in 2021.

==== Commemorative art and honours ====
In August 2008, a blue plaque was unveiled on the corner of Tavistock Road and Portobello Road commemorating Claudia Jones as the "Mother of Caribbean Carnival in Britain".

In October 2008, Britain's Royal Mail commemorated Jones with a special postage stamp.

On 14 October 2020, Jones was honoured with a Google Doodle.

A sculpture of Claudia Jones by artist Favour Jonathan, created as part of the 2021 Sky Arts series Landmark, is on display at Black Cultural Archives in Brixton.

In January 2023, English Heritage announced that a blue plaque would be unveiled later that year on a house in Vauxhall that Jones shared for almost four years.

==== Public Acknowledgment ====
In 2018 Jones was named by the Evening Standard on a list of 14 "Inspirational Black British women throughout history" (alongside Phillis Wheatley, Mary Seacole, Adelaide Hall, Margaret Busby, Olive Morris, Connie Mark, Joan Armatrading, Tessa Sanderson, Doreen Lawrence, Maggie Aderin-Pocock, Sharon White, Malorie Blackman, Diane Abbott and Zadie Smith).

Bustle magazine included Jones on a list of "7 Black British Women Throughout History That Deserve To Be Household Names In 2019", together with Mary Prince, Evelyn Dove, Olive Morris, Margaret Busby, Olivette Otele, and Shirley Thompson.

In June 2023, Jones was listed as one of the Windrush generation who struggled for civil rights in the UK.

=== Commemoration of the 100th anniversary of her birth ===
Beginning in June 2014, various events celebrated Claudia Jones's centenary. Community Support led extensive research into her life, uncovering new details beyond the three existing biographies and films.

They organised A Claudia Jones 100 Day on 21 February 2015 at Kennington Park Estate Community Centre, including a guided tour of her two main London residences and the former West Indian Gazette office nearby.

There was also a celebration at The Cloth, in Belmont, Port of Spain, Trinidad and Tobago, near to her birthplace, on the same day.

The day was preceded by a film screening of Looking for Claudia Jones by Z. Nia Reynolds at the Claudia Jones Organization in Hackney.

== See also ==
- Trevor Carter
- Billy Strachan
- Len Johnson
- Dorothy Kuya
- Paul Robeson
- Buzz Johnson
- Cleston Taylor
- Winston Pinder
- Communist Party of the USA
