= Dorothy Kuya =

British political and anti-racist activist (1932–2013)

- Born: 16 March 1933; Toxteth, Liverpool, England
- Died: 23 December 2013 (aged 80)
- Citizenship: United Kingdom
- Organization(s): National Assembly of Women (NAW); Teachers Against Racism
- Known for: Communist activism Successful campaign to create Liverpool's International Slavery Museum
- Political party: Communist Party of Great Britain (CPGB)

Dorothy Kuya (16 March 1933 – 23 December 2013) was a leading British communist and human rights activist from Liverpool, the co-founder of Teachers Against Racism, and the general secretary of the National Assembly of Women (NAW). She was a life-long member of the Communist Party of Great Britain (CPGB), and is known for being Liverpool's first community relations officer and for leading a successful campaign to establish the International Slavery Museum in Liverpool. During the mid-1980s, Kuya served as the chair of the London housing association Ujima, during which time it became the largest black-led social enterprise in Europe.

The Director of National Museums Liverpool described her as "Liverpool's greatest fighter against racism and racial intolerance" and "one of the country's leading figures in combating inequality."

== Early life ==
Dorothy Kuya was born in Toxteth, Liverpool, on 16 March 1933; her father was a black man from Sierra Leone and her mother was a white British woman. After her father disappeared, her mother remarried and Dorothy took her step-father's surname. Dorothy grew up in Liverpool 8, a working-class area and one of the oldest black communities in Britain.

At age 13, Kuya joined the Young Communist League, due to her awareness of the poverty, racism and unemployment in Liverpool. She went on to join the Communist Party of Great Britain (CPGB) in the 1940s. She became an active member, selling the Daily Worker on Liverpool streets and speaking at meetings. In 1949, she greeted American civil rights leader Paul Robeson with a bouquet of flowers during his tour of Britain.

== Adult life ==
In her professional life, Kuya trained to become a nurse and then a teacher. She moved to London to start teaching in a north London school, and she joined her local branch of the CPGB. During her time as a London teacher, Kuya met fellow communist teacher Bridget Harriss, and the two of them co-founded the organisation Teachers Against Racism. Kuya also became friends with another communist activist, Ken Forge, who like Kuya had joined the CPGB after experiencing anti-black racism in Britain. Kuya helped Forge establish the first Black Studies course in a south London comprehensive school. Kuya also became a friend of American black rights activist Vinie Burrows.

Kuya became heavily involved with an influential academic journal called Dragon's Teeth, which published research investigating racism and sexism within British children's books and suggested alternatives to the same. In connection with this journal, she established the Racism Awareness Unit, with financial support from the Greater London Council. Kuya was also an active member of the National Assembly of Women (NAW), ensuring that anti-racist activism stayed at the forefront of their campaigns, and was eventually elected their general secretary. Kuya's contributions to the study of British racism were included within the communist publication Black and Blue: Racism and the Police State. During the 1980s, Kuya became the Head of Race Equality for Haringey Council, and worked closely with Labour Party MP Bernie Grant.

During the mid-1980s, Kuya became the chair of Ujima, a London housing association, and in that role she helped steer the organisation into becoming the largest black-led social enterprise in Europe.

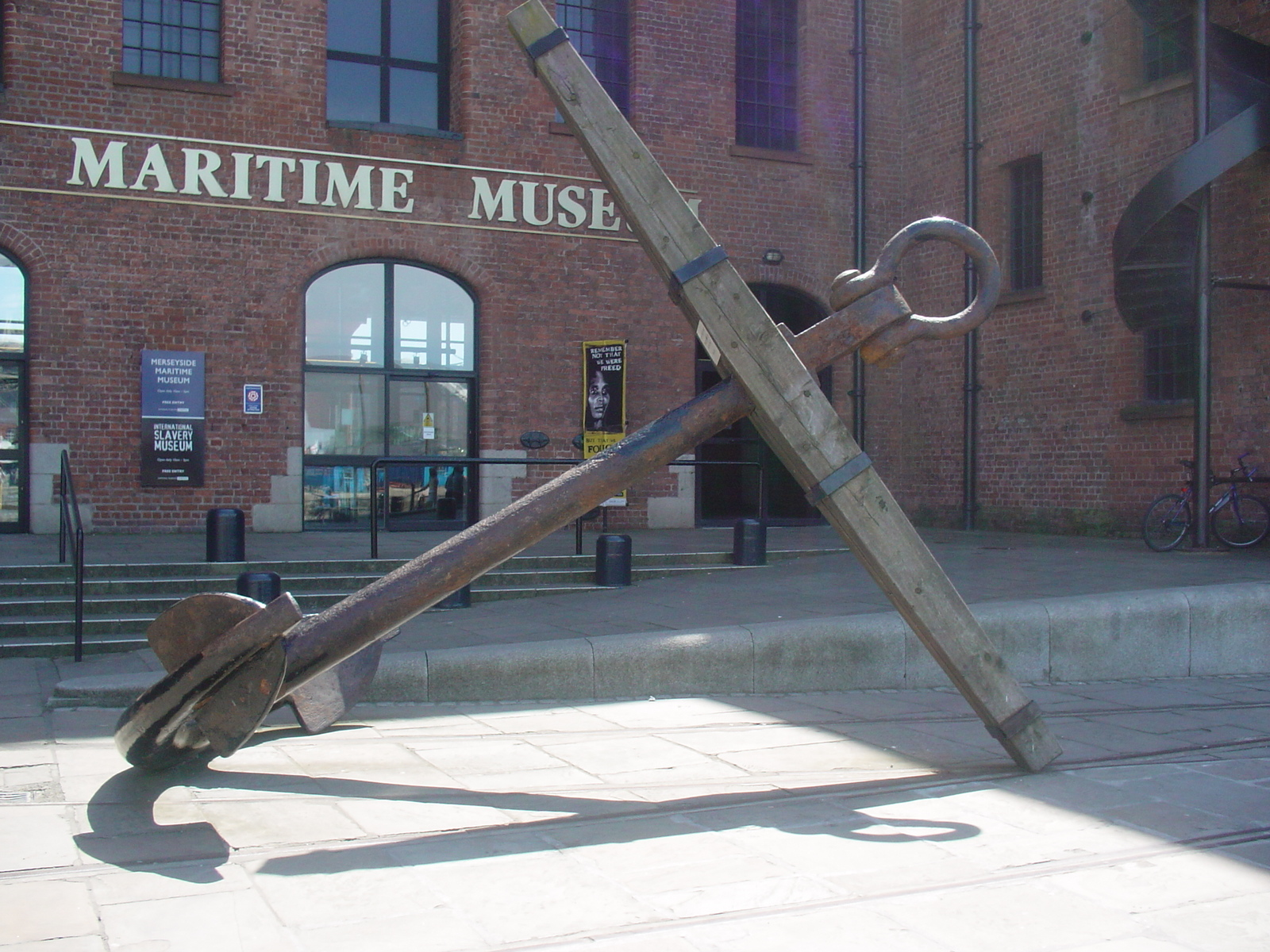
The entrance to Liverpool's International Slavery Museum, created partially as a result of Kuya's campaign activism

=== Return to Liverpool ===
Kuya returned to living in Liverpool, where she bought a house in Liverpool 8, the same community where she was raised. She created and directed the Liverpool Slavery History Trail tours, which sought to uncover hidden-histories in the city. During this time, Kuya dedicated herself to anti-racist activism and pushed for the creation of a slavery museum in Liverpool, a city that had been heavily involved in the transatlantic slave trade. Her campaign was successful, and she played a key role in the development of Liverpool's International Slavery Museum, which opened in August 2007. According to her biographers, Kuya was "overjoyed when the Slavery Museum opened" and labelled the museum itself as a "tribute to her vision and determination". She also advocated for the observation of a Slavery Remembrance Day, first held in 1999 and since then held annually on 23 August.

== Death and legacy ==
Kuya died on 23 December 2013.

The Communist Party of Britain, the successor of the Communist Party of Great Britain, considers Dorothy Kuya as "one of the Communist Party's most important Black members from the 1940s to the 1980s".

Journalist Louis Julienne described Kuya as "a tireless campaigner against discrimination and racism."

In 2022, the International Slavery Museum in Liverpool published an animated video describing Dorothy Kuya's life and praising her work.

=== Annual memorial lectures ===
To honour her, National Museums Liverpool renamed their annual "Slavery Remembrance Day Memorial Lecture" as the "Dorothy Kuya Slavery Remembrance Memorial Lecture Series". In 2015, Nelson Mandela's grandson was scheduled to give a speech at the annual lectures; however, he called off his visit, citing family reasons. Other lecturers in the series have included:

- 2016: Black British activist, author and musician Akala, on the Haitian Revolution
- 2019: writer, photographer and broadcaster Johny Pitts
- 2020: community and human rights campaigner Zita Holbourne and British academic specialising in slavery Stephen A. Small
- 2023: historian Hakim Adi, on combatting racism through transformative education

=== Liverpool University residential hall ===
In 2021, a residence hall belonging to the University of Liverpool, which was formerly known as "Gladstone Hall", was renamed after Dorothy Kuya. Gladstone Hall was originally named after William Ewart Gladstone, who served on four occasions as Prime Minister of the United Kingdom, whose family became rich through the slave trade. More than 4,465 students of the University of Liverpool voted on a historical figure they believed would be a suitable replacement, and the winner of the vote was Dorothy Kuya. The University of Liverpool described Kuya as a "tireless campaigner for racial equality". The university also promised in April 2021 that they would soon erect a memorial plaque to Dorothy Kuya before the new academic year.

=== The Dorothy Kuya Creative Archives Project ===
In 2023, it was announced that National Museums Liverpool had commissioned the community organisation Writing on the Wall to develop the "Dorothy Kuya Creative Archives Project".

== See also ==
- Charlie Hutchison
- Claudia Jones
- Trevor Carter
- Peter Blackman
- George Powe
- Len Johnson
- Winston Pinder
- Cleston Taylor
