= Caribbean News =

Black British newspaper (1952–1956)

- Founder: Billy Strachan
- Publisher: Caribbean Labour Congress
- Editor: Ranji Chandisingh
- Founded: 1952
- Political alignment: Communist, anti-colonial, anti-racist
- Language: English
- Headquarters: London, England
- Circulation: 2,000

Caribbean News (1952–1956) was a Black British newspaper, notable for being one of the first Black British newspapers in the United Kingdom. Caribbean News was founded and published by the London branch of the Caribbean Labour Congress under the guidance of Black British civil rights leader and communist activist Billy Strachan, and existed between 1952 and 1956.

Although Strachan played a key role in founding the paper, it was edited by fellow activist Ranji Chandisingh, with occasional articles from Strachan appearing in a column called "Billy's Corner". Another well known writer for Caribbean News was the communist and black civil rights activist Henry Gunter, who wrote articles denouncing the colour bar.

The publication of Caribbean News predated by six years that of the West Indian Gazette, a newspaper widely considered to have been Britain's first major black newspaper.

Archives for Caribbean News can be found in the University of London's archives.
