= George Powe =

Jamaican-British equity activist (1926–2013)

- Born: Oswald George Powe; 11 August 1926; Spanish Town, Jamaica
- Died: 9 September 2013 (aged 87); Nottingham, England
- Education: Electrical engineering, Kingston Technical School
- Known for: Labour activism, anti-racism

Oswald George Powe (11 August 1926 – 9 September 2013), known as George Powe, was a Jamaican-born racial-equality activist in England.

Powe served in the Royal Air Force during World War II, before moving to England. He led a successful campaign forcing the Raleigh Bicycle Company to improve their treatment and recruitment of Black workers. He is the author of the 1956 publication Don’t Blame the Blacks. When he was elected as a Labour Party local councillor, he became one of the first Black Labour councillors nationwide and the first Black Labour councillor in Greater Nottingham.

A blue plaque marks Powe's family home and a bus was named after him in 2022.

== Early life ==
Powe was born on 11 August 1926 in Spanish Town, Jamaica. His parents were Richard Pow / Pow Un Chun, a Chinese migrant to Jamaica, and Leonora Sinclair. They were shopkeepers.

Powe's father was Confucianist, his mother, Roman Catholic.

At the age of five, Powe attended the Kingston Chinese school, thereafter joining St Ann's Elementary School in Kingston. Later, he studied electrical engineering at Kingston Technical School, before volunteering to join the Royal Air Force (RAF) in 1944, pretending to be older than his actual 17 years of age.

His birth name was Oswald George Pow, which before he acquired British nationality, he changed by deed poll from Pow to Powe.

== Career ==
After enlisting in the RAF, in Kingston, Jamaica, Powe was part of a contingent of 1,935 volunteers who sailed on a troopship that docked at Greenock, Scotland, in November 1944. On 12 November they were taken by train to RAF Hunmanby Moor, near Filey, Yorkshire, for two months' initial training. Powe was later relocated to RAF Yatesbury, Wiltshire, for radar training. He was then assigned for one year to RAF Sennen, Penzance, and then posted to RAF West Prawle, South Devon. He returned to Jamaica in May 1948 and was demobilised in August.

He travelled back to England on the SS Orbita, disembarking at Liverpool on 2 October 1948. He subsequently worked in Birmingham and the East Midlands as an electrician. In 1969, he trained as a teacher before teaching mathematics at Robert Mellors School in Nottingham. He retired in 1983.

== Politics and activism ==
In 1956, Powe campaigned for bike manufacturer Raleigh Bicycle Company to improve their recruitment policies for Black workers. His successful campaign, which included arranging the threat of a Jamaican trade embargo, resulted in Raleigh eventually becoming one of the major employers of Black people in Nottingham.

In 1958, Powe authored Don’t Blame the Blacks, a publication about the UK's complicated relationship between Britain and its Commonwealth citizens. In a 2022 edition and his daughter's account, the date is incorrectly stated as 1956. In the 1960s, he was a leader in the campaign against a local pub that refused to serve Black people. In 1964, Powe was a key part of a campaign to push Nottingham City Council to abolish their practice of channeling all labour complaints from Black workers though a specific welfare officer, rather than dealing directly with the complainants.

After initially joining the Communist Party, from 1963 to 1966 Powe was elected as the Labour Party local councillor for Long Eaton in Derbyshire. From 1989 to 1992, he was a Labour councillor on Nottinghamshire County Council, making him one of the first Black Labour councillors in the UK, and the first in Greater Nottingham.

In 1972, Powe was the chairman of a committee who successfully campaigned for better treatment of Pakistani workers at Nottingham textile company Crepe Sizes Ltd.

He was a key part of founding the African Caribbean National Artistic Centre, now one of the UK's oldest Black community centres. In 2011, Powe donated his documents to the Nottingham Black Archive.

== Family life ==
Powe had five children with Barbara Florence Poole, whom he met in 1948, one of whom died at a young age. They separated in 1970 and divorced in 1977. Powe married Jill Westby in 1982.

== Death and legacy ==
Powe died at home on 9 September 2013, aged 87. His funeral was held in Mansfield Road Baptist Church and he was buried in Wilford Hill Cemetery, Nottingham.

Powe was a community elder and a founding member of the African Caribbean National Artistic Centre (ACNA Centre), one of the UK's oldest Black community centres.

In 2011, Powe donated a substantial number of historic documents to the Nottingham Black Archive, as well as being filmed for a documentary about the experiences of black servicemen who came to the UK following WW2.

In 2021, Powe's activism was the focus of the Don't Blame the Blacks exhibition at Nottingham Castle. A blue plaque was installed on the Powe family home in July 2022, and Nottingham City Transport named a bus after Powe in August 2022.
