= Cadre =

Cadre may refer to:

- Cadre (military), a group of officers or NCOs around whom a unit is formed, or a training staff
- Cadre (politics), a politically controlled appointment to an institution in order to circumvent the state and bring control to the party
  - Cadre system of the Chinese Communist Party, the system specific to the Chinese Communist Party in the People's Republic of China
- Cadre (company), a New York-based real estate financial technology firm
- Cadre (comics), a DC Comics supervillain group
- Adam Cadre, American writer
- Arthur Cadre (born 1991) French dancer, contortionist, choreographer, model, and former architect
- CADRE Cooperative Autonomous Distributed Robotic Explorers, NASA Moon rover project
- CADRE Laboratory for New Media at San Jose State University
- Constructor Acquires Destructor Releases, alternate name for Resource Acquisition Is Initialization programming idiom
- The Cadre (newspaper), the student-run newspaper at University of Prince Edward Island in Charlottetown, Prince Edward Island
