= West Indian Gazette =

Black British newspaper (1958–1965)

West Indian Gazette (WIG) (1958–1965) was a newspaper founded in March 1958 in Brixton, London, England, by Trinidadian communist & black nationalist activist Claudia Jones (1915–1964). The title as displayed on its masthead was subsequently expanded to West Indian Gazette And Afro-Asian Caribbean News. WIG is widely considered to have been Britain's first major commercial black newspaper. Jones, who originally worked on its development with Amy Ashwood Garvey, was its editor. WIG lasted until 1965, but always struggled financially, closing eight months and four editions after Claudia Jones's death.

== History ==
Started as a monthly, the West Indian Gazette quickly gained a circulation of 15,000. The offices of the newspaper were located in the centre of the then developing Caribbean community in south London, at 250 Brixton Road, above Theo Campbell's record shop.

== Impact ==
Carole Boyce Davies, biographer of Claudia Jones, ascribes to the West Indian Gazette "a foundational role in developing the Caribbean diaspora in London". According to Donald Hinds, who worked as a journalist on WIG: "It was not merely a vehicle to bring the news of what was happening back home and in the diaspora to Britain. It also commented on the arts in all their forms.... It published poems and stories. Its trenchant editorials did not stop at Britain but had an opinion on the what, where and why of the cold war's hot spots."

As "a vehicle for the development of a shared identity among West Indian migrants in Britain" (publishing, for example, Jan Carew's article "What is a West Indian?" in April 1959), the paper addressed issues including racial discrimination in Britain, anti-colonial struggles in Africa, and federalism in the Caribbean. Among its contributors was George Lamming, who in an article in February 1962 wrote of his realisation that because of the British class system "almost two-thirds of the population ... were in a colonial relation to the culture and traditions which were called England", at which point his own process of decolonisation began.

Jones herself, in her last published essay, "The Caribbean Community in Britain", said of WIG: "The newspaper has served as a catalyst, quickening the awareness, socially and politically, of West Indians, Afro-Asians and their friends. Its editorial stand is for a united, independent West Indies, full economic, social and political equality and respect for human dignity for West Indians and Afro-Asians in Britain, and for peace and friendship between all Commonwealth and world peoples."

Describing the newspaper as "a critical resource through which black British political consciousness emerged during the early 1960s", University of Manchester historian Tariq Chastanet-Hird notes: "In developing a shared culture among migrants, fighting local racial discrimination and constructing transnational linkages, the paper was unrestricted in its ambitions."

== See also ==
- Caribbean News (1952–1956)
