= Jewish world =

Jewish world primarily refers to:

- Jews
- Judaism by country
- Jewish population by country

Jewish World may also refer to:

== Periodicals ==
- The Jewish World, Jewish weekly newspaper in the United States
- The Jewish World (London), defunct Jewish weekly newspaper in Great Britain
- San Diego Jewish World, United States
- Long Island Jewish World, United States
- The American Jewish World, United States

== Other ==
- Jewish World Watch, non-profit humanitarian organization

== See also ==
- International Jewish conspiracy or world Jewish conspiracy, an antisemitic conspiracy theory
