= Double Threat =

Book by Ellin Bessner about Jewish-Canadian History

Double Threat: Canadian Jews, the Military, and World War II is a 2018 book by Ellin Bessner.

== Background ==
Ellin Bessner, the Canadian journalist and author of Double Threat, was inspired to explore the role of Canadian Jews in the war by the words: "He died so Jewry should suffer no more" which were inscribed on a Jewish Canadian soldier's tombstone in Normandy.

== Overview ==
Double Threat focuses on the 17,000 Canadian Jews who enlisted in the Canadian military during World War II, of whom 450 did not survive.

The soldiers faced a "double threat"– they were not only fighting against Fascism, but for the survival of the Jewish people. At the same time, they encountered widespread antisemitism and the danger of being identified as Jews if captured in combat. The title of the book comes from a letter written by Canada's Prime Minister during the war, William Lyon MacKenzie King, thanking the Jewish community for their efforts during the War and how they faced a "double threat" of both Nazi aggression and the survival of the Jewish people.

In conducting background research for Double Threat, the author conducted hundreds of interviews and performed extensive archival research to paint a picture of the historical complexities of the participation of Canadian Jews in World War II.

== Reception ==
After its publication in 2019, Double Threat was featured in the Montreal Gazette and the Hamilton Jewish News. A review by Bill Gladstone in the Long Island Jewish World described the topic of book as having "never been covered in such depth before".

The work was reviewed by Jennifer Shaw in the journal Canadian Jewish Studies, Shaw wrote that Bessner "does an excellent job of exploring how gender and Judaism mixed for female soldiers" in the book.

== About the author ==
Ellin Bessner was born and raised in Montreal, Canada. She used to skate at Mount Royal before heading to Ottawa to study. She graduated with a degree in journalism and political science from Carleton University. As a journalist, she worked for CTV News and CBC News, which took her not only in Canada but around the world, as well as stringing for the Globe and Mail and The Canadian Press. During the 1990s, Ms. Bessner covered several civil wars in Africa. She has conducted interviews with, among others, Prince Philip and the Dalai Lama. In addition to her work as a journalist and author, Ms. Bessner taught journalism at Centennial College in Toronto for almost 20 years.

== Bibliography ==
- Ellin Bessner, Double Threat: Canadian Jews, the Military, and World War II, (Toronto: New Jewish Press, 2018), 358 pp., ISBN 978-1988326047.

== See also ==
- Canada in World War II
- None Is Too Many
