= Harold Troper =

Canadian writer, historian and academic (born 1942)

Harold (Hesh) Troper (born January 1, 1942) is a Canadian writer, historian and academic. He specializes in Jewish Canadian history. Together with Irving Abella, he authored None Is Too Many, the story of the Canadian government's refusal to allow Jewish immigration from Europe during the Holocaust. This book was selected as one of the 100 most important Canadian books ever written, chosen by a panel of experts for the Literary Review of Canada.

Troper is the author of several other books, including, The Ransomed of God: The Secret Rescue of the Jews of Syria and Old wounds : Jews, Ukrainians and the hunt for Nazi war criminals in Canada. He is a professor of education at the Ontario Institute for Studies in Education/University of Toronto in Toronto, Ontario. Current research interests include Canadian social history, immigration, education of ethnic and minority groups, American history, and the history of education.
