= None Is Too Many =

1983 book

None Is Too Many: Canada and the Jews of Europe, 1933–1948
- Author: Irving Abella and Harold Troper
- Published: 1983 by Lester & Orpen Dennys
- ISBN: 978-0-919630-31-4

None Is Too Many: Canada and the Jews of Europe 1933–1948 is a 1983 book co-authored by the Canadian historians Irving Abella and Harold Troper. It is about Canada's restrictive immigration policy towards Jewish refugees during the Holocaust years. It helped popularize the phrase "none is too many" in Canada.

== Overview ==
First published in 1983 by Lester & Orpen Dennys, and reissued in 2012 by University of Toronto Press, the book documents the history of the Canadian response to Jewish refugees from 1933, with the rise of the Nazi government in Germany, until 1948. The authors argue that while many nations were complicit in the Holocaust for their refusal to admit Jewish refugees during the Nazi era, the Canadian government did less than other Western countries to help Jewish refugees between 1933 and 1948. The most infamous example of Canada's immigration policy was the refusal to admit the MS St. Louis, a German ocean liner carrying refugees. Only 5,000 Jewish refugees entered Canada from 1933 until 1945, which the book argues was the worst of any refugee receiving nation in the world. This response was possible in part because of Canada's history of antisemitism.

The authors identify Frederick Blair, the head of immigration in William Lyon Mackenzie King's government, as a top official who opposed and limited Jewish immigration. They say that Blair's policy had the full support of Mackenzie King, who was prime minister 1935–48, Vincent Massey, the high commissioner to Britain, and both Anglophone and Francophone elites in general.

== Title ==
The title is based on an incident recounted in the book. In 1945, an unidentified immigration official was asked by reporters how many Jews would be allowed in Canada after the war. He replied, "None is too Many". The phrase has since entered common parlance in Canada. In 2011, a monument, referred to in the media as the "none is too many" memorial, was displayed in Halifax's Canadian Museum of Immigration at Pier 21 to commemorate the MS St. Louis. In 2015, Liberal leader Justin Trudeau was criticized by several Jewish groups after he used the phrase to criticize the Conservative government's immigration policy for Muslims. In 2018, in an unrelated address, Trudeau pledged to make a formal apology for the Canadian government's turning away of the St. Louis "due to our discriminatory 'none is too many' immigration policy of the time."

== Reception ==
At the time of writing, Abella and Troper had difficulty finding a publisher. Troper said that he and Abella were told that "the book was something of a downer and seemed somewhat 'un-Canadian'", a sentiment that alluded to the myth of the putative Canadian ethic of welcoming the oppressed. The book was eventually published by Lester & Orpen Dennys, to acclaim. Reviewer William French wrote that Abella and Troper did "a superb job of unearthing this sorry chapter in [Canadian] history ... By exhaustively pursuing primary sources, they have documented the details ... with chilling precision."

Upon the 2013 reissue of the book, Richard A. Hawkins wrote that while the authors did address the international policy context, Abella and Troper could have explored Canadian immigration policy in the context of the British Empire (of which Canada was, during WWII, a part) to a greater extent – while, he wrote, the British were overall not unsympathetic to the plight of Jewish refugees, there was a schism in opinion after Kristallnacht and subsequently more efforts in Britain to actively address the Jewish refugee crisis, including the Kindertransport system: "It would be interesting to know whether Canada was asked to participate in the Kindertransport and whether any efforts were made to raise money in Canada to fund [it]."

== Influence ==
The book is periodically referenced in debates on immigration policy in Canada. Co-author Irving Abella wrote that he and Troper had not anticipated that the book would have much impact beyond addressing and exposing a "disturbing piece of [Canadian] history", but that "it has become an ethical yardstick against which contemporaneous government policies are gauged", and that it was instrumental in enabling Vietnamese boat people to seek safety in the country in the late 1970s. In 1979, Canada's deputy minister of immigration reportedly handed the manuscript of the book to immigration minister Ron Atkey, saying "this should not be you". Atkey then advocated for the admission of more Vietnamese refugees to Canada. "He drew the parallels to our attention, was moved by it himself and we all were", prime minister Joe Clark recalled.

== Awards ==
- 1983: National Jewish Book Award in the Holocaust category
- 1983: Sir John A. Macdonald Award (now the CHA Best Scholarly Book in Canadian History Prize)

== See also ==
- Double Threat
- Évian Conference
- FAST – Fighting Antisemitism Together
- The Traitor and the Jew
- Cairine Wilson
