= Irving Abella =

Canadian historian (1940–2022)

Irving Abella CM OOnt FRSC
- Born: Irving Martin Abella; July 2, 1940; Toronto, Ontario, Canada
- Died: July 3, 2022 (aged 82)
- Title: President of the Canadian Jewish Congress (1992–1995)
- Spouse: Rosalie Abella (m. 1968)

Academic background
- Education: University College, Toronto
- Thesis: The Struggle for Industrial Unionism in Canada (1969)
- Doctoral advisor: Craig Brown; Kenneth McNaught

Academic work
- Discipline: History; Jewish studies
- Sub-discipline: Canadian Jewish history; Canadian labour history
- Institutions: York University
- Notable works: None Is Too Many (1983)

Irving Martin Abella CM OOnt FRSC (July 2, 1940 – July 3, 2022) was a Canadian historian who served as a professor at York University from 1968 to 2013. He specialized in the history of the Jews in Canada and the Canadian labour movement.

== Early life ==
Abella was born in Toronto on July 2, 1940. His parents were Esther (Shiff) and Louis Abella, both of Lithuanian-Jewish origins. He studied at the University of Toronto, obtaining a Bachelor of Arts in 1963 and a Master of Arts the following year. He commenced his doctoral studies at the University of California, Berkeley, before returning to the University of Toronto and being awarded a Doctor of Philosophy in 1969. He wrote his thesis on Canadian labour history.

== Career ==
Abella first taught at York University in 1968, specializing in labour and Jewish history. He continued teaching at that institution until 2013. During the early 1970s, he started the first university course in Canadian Jewish studies at Glendon College, which he considered his greatest achievement. He served as president of the Canadian Jewish Congress from 1992 to 1995. He was also chair of Vision TV, a religious broadcaster. He was president of the Canadian Historical Association for the year 1999-2000.

Abella's books include Coat of Many Colours: Two Centuries of Jewish Life in Canada (1990) and None Is Too Many: Canada and the Jews of Europe, 1933–1948 (1982). He stated that the latter – which detailed the Canadian government's immigration policy during the 1930s that led it to accept only 5,000 Jewish refugees during World War II – was not intended to be more than an academic text. However, it ultimately impacted the immigration policy of the government at the time. After Ron Atkey, the minister of immigration, read a draft copy of the manuscript, the Canadian government welcomed 50,000 Vietnamese boat people by the end of 1980 (up from the original goal of 8,000 refugees per year).

== Personal life and death ==
Abella married Rosalie Silberman Abella in 1968. They met while studying at the University of Toronto together, and remained married until his death. She was later appointed to the Supreme Court of Canada in August 2004. Together, they have two children, Jacob and Zachary.

Abella died on July 3, 2022, one day after his 82nd birthday. He suffered from an unspecified long illness prior to his death.

== Awards and honours ==
Abella was a fellow of the Royal Society of Canada. He was conferred the National Jewish Book Award in 1983 under the Holocaust category for None Is Too Many: Canada and the Jews of Europe, 1933–1948. He was appointed a member of the Order of Canada in October 1993 and invested four months later in February of the following year. He was the recipient of the Queen Elizabeth II Golden Jubilee Medal (2002) and the Queen Elizabeth II Diamond Jubilee Medal (2012). Abella later received the Order of Ontario in 2014 "for his contribution to documenting the story of Jewish Canadians, and his commitment to the principles of social justice and tolerance."

== Publications ==
- Nationalism, Communism and Canadian Labour (1973) ISBN 9780802002334
- On Strike: Six Key Labour Struggles in Canada 1919–1949 (1974) ISBN 9780888620576
- The Canadian Worker in the Twentieth Century (co-editor, 1978) ISBN 9780195402506
- None Is Too Many: Canada and the Jews of Europe 1933–1948 (with Harold Troper, 1982) ISBN 9780919630314
- A Coat of Many Colours: Two Centuries of Jewish Life in Canada (1990) ISBN 9780886192518

== See also ==
- Harold Troper
- VisionTV

Non-profit organization positions
Preceded by Les Scheininger	President of the Canadian Jewish Congress; 1992–1995	Succeeded by Goldie Hershon
Professional and academic associations
Preceded by Gregory Kealey	President of the Canadian Historical Association; 1999–2000	Succeeded by Chad Gaffield
