= Long Island Jewish World =

- Format: Weekly, subscription based publication
- Publisher: Jerome W. Lippman
- Founded: 1976
- City: Long Island, New York
- Circulation: 16,000

Long Island Jewish World is a weekly, subscription based publication that covers local, domestic and international events for the Jewish communities of the metropolitan New York City area. The publication is a wholly owned subsidiary of Empire Publishing and Printing. Empire also publishes The Manhattan Jewish Sentinel and The Rockland and Westchester Jewish Tribune. Despite its small circulation of about 45,000 in 1984, articles from the paper have been quoted in New York Times, Washington Post, New York Daily News, The Village Voice, Jerusalem Post and Newsday.

== Beginning ==
In 1984, publisher-editor Jerome W. Lippman charged that the United Jewish Appeal-Federation of Jewish Philanthropies (UJA) was unfairly using its charity to fund The Jewish Week and imitating his newspaper, in order to put his paper out of business. This "newspaper war" lasted several years, with multiple failed attempts at reconciliation.

In June 1994 it purchased The Manhattan Jewish Sentinel.

== Content ==
The editorial content of Long Island Jewish World is a mix of social and political nature commonly featuring open letters, op-eds and submissions from some of the top names in journalism and politics, locally and abroad. The content also spans the spectrum of the Jewish community from the Orthodox to the modern, secular Jew.
