= Mòruisg =

Mountain in Scotland

Coordinates: 57.4998°N 5.1701°W

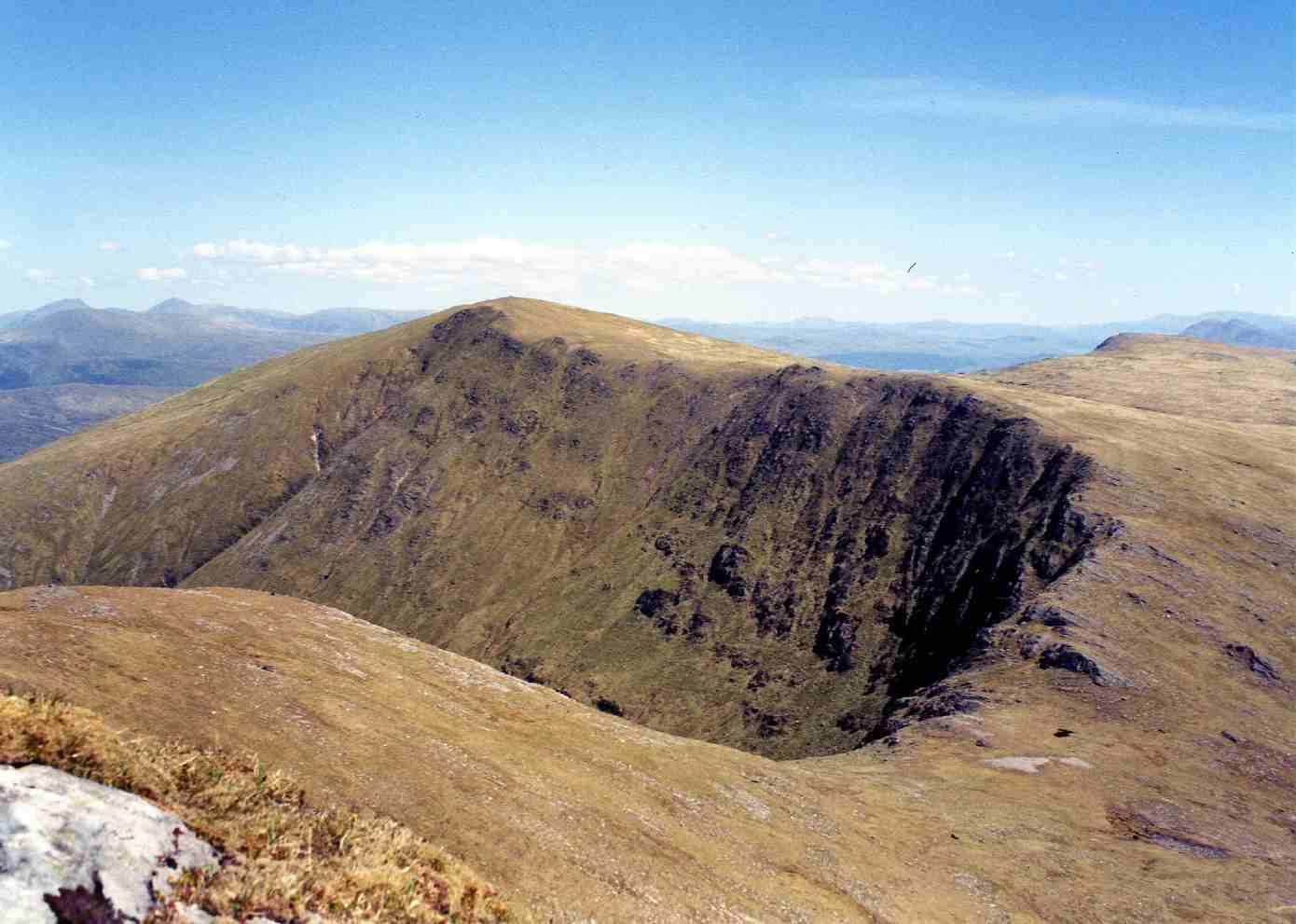
- Mòruisg seen from Sgùrr nan Ceannaichean across Coire Toll nan Bian.

Highest point
- Elevation: 928 m (3,045 ft)
- Prominence: 594 m (1,949 ft)
- Parent peak: Sgurr a' Choire Ghlais
- Listing: Munro, Marilyn

Naming
- English translation: Big Water
- Language of name: Gaelic
- Pronunciation: Scottish Gaelic: [ˈmoːɾɯʃkʲ] English approximation: MOR-uushk

Geography
- Location: Wester Ross, Scotland
- Parent range: Northwest Highlands
- OS grid: NH101500
- Topo map: OS Landranger 25, OS Explorer 429

Mòruisg is a Scottish mountain situated in the Glencarron and Glenuig Forest, 10 kilometres south west of the village of Achnasheen in the Highland council area.

== Overview ==
The hill reaches a height of 928 metres (3044 feet) and is the most easily accessible of the Glen Carron Munros, being situated just three kilometres from the A890 road which runs through the glen. Its Scottish Gaelic name translates as “Big Water” which is slightly unusual as the only sheets of water on the mountain are two small lochs in the corries to the north of the mountain.

== Geography ==
Mòruisg is a mountain that is often referred to in disparaging tones by guide book writers, with the SMC Munros Guide calling it “not a very exciting mountain”. However to the north and south are fine corries which provide good winter routes. The northern corrie of Corrie na Glas-lic holds the aforementioned lochs of Loch Cnoc na Mointeich and Loch Coireag nan Mang. Moruisg received something a boost in 1981 when the adjoining mountain of Sgùrr nan Ceannaichean, 2.5 km to the south west, was elevated to Munro status thus making a more interesting circular walk for Munro baggers. This walk goes along the rim of the fine corrie of Coire Toll nan Bian (see picture) which stands between the two mountains, although Sgùrr nan Ceannaichean has since been demoted to a Corbett.

Mòruisg is a long, steep sided mountain with a flat extensive summit plateau, the level top has many minor bumps and cairns and it can be difficult to ascertain the highest point, especially in mist. Its north and western slopes descend steeply to Glen Carron, its southern flanks are precipitous as they fall the valley of the Allt a’ Chonais which contains the track to Glenuaig Lodge. To the south west is a ridge that skirts Coire Toll nam Bian and connects to Sgurr nan Ceannaichean. The northern corries look out over featureless moorland which descends towards Achnasheen. To the east of the highest point the plateau undulates, going over several minor tops before culminating in the outlying top of Càrn Gorm (875 metres) which is marked by an OS trig point.

== Ascents ==
The direct ascent of Mòruisg starts on the A890 road in Glen Carron at a parking spot one kilometre west of Loch Sgamhain at grid reference NH079520. After crossing the River Carron by the footbridge it is a steep climb of almost 800 metres to reach the summit through heather and scree. Almost all ascents of Mòruisg are combined with the neighbouring Munro of Sgurr nan Ceannaichean. Approaches are possible from the south using well graded stalkers' paths; one of these leaves the valley of the Allt a’ Chonais and climbs Sgùrr nan Ceannaichean first before continuing to Mòruisg. Another path starts at Glenuaig Lodge and climbs the precipitous southern slopes direct to the mountains summit.

== View ==
The mountain is a fine viewpoint being surrounded by deep glens it has a sizeable topographic prominence of 594 metres. The highlights of the view from the summit are the remote mountains to the north of Loch Monar and the rest of the Glen Carron mountains to the west.
