= Sgùrr nan Ceannaichean =

Mountain in Scotland

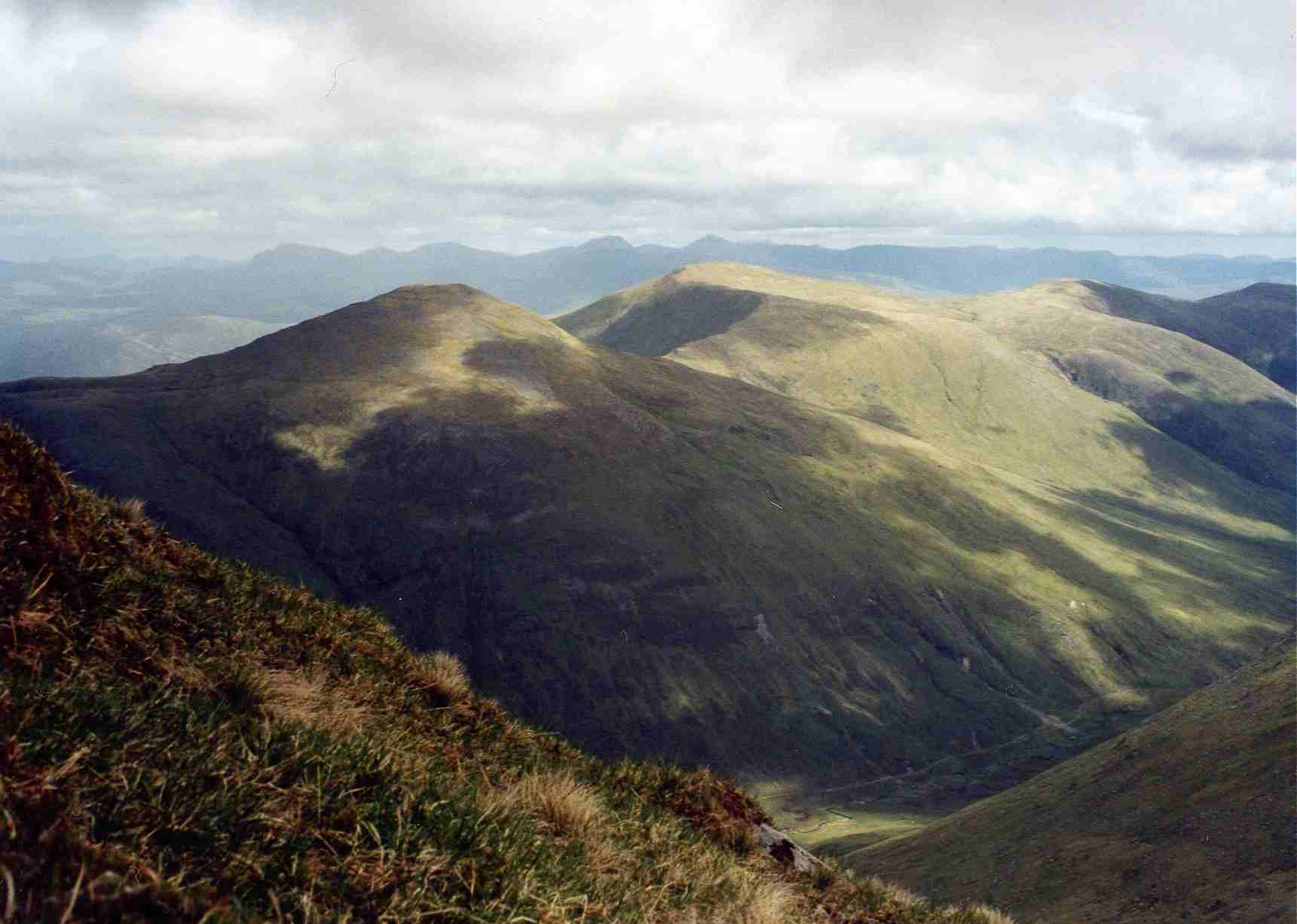
- Sgùrr nan Ceannaichean seen from Sgùrr Choinnich, 3.5 km to the south.

Highest point
- Elevation: 913.4 m (2,997 ft)
- Prominence: 181 m
- Listing: Corbett, Marilyn
- Coordinates: 57.4822°N 5.1924°W

Naming
- English translation: Peak of the Merchants or Pedlars
- Language of name: Gaelic
- Pronunciation: Scottish Gaelic: [ˈs̪kuːrˠ nəŋʲ ˈkʰʲan̪ˠɪçən]

Geography
- Location: Wester Ross, Scotland
- Parent range: Northwest Highlands
- OS grid: NH087480
- Topo map: OS Landranger 25, OS Explorer 429

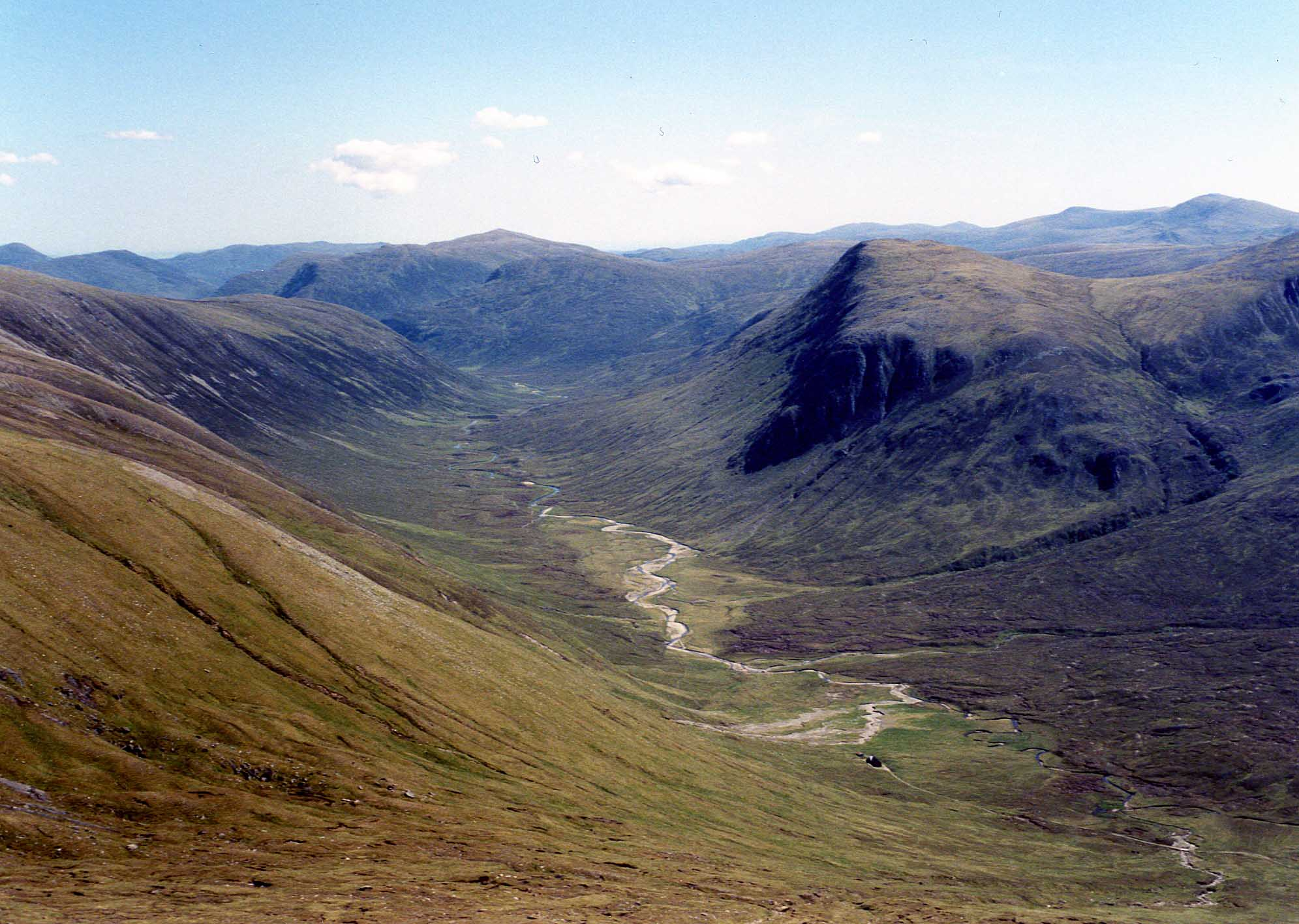
Looking east from the summit down Gleann Fhiodhaig.

Sgùrr nan Ceannaichean is a Scottish mountain situated 13 kilometres southwest of the village of Achnasheen on the southern side of Glen Carron within the Glencarron and Glenuig Forest in the Ross and Cromarty district of the Highland council area.

== Overview ==
The mountain's name translates from the Gaelic as Peak of the Merchants or Pedlars. The name may be associated with a main routeway between east and west Scotland passing just to the north, Sgùrr nan Ceannaichean being a significant landmark for traders and travellers.

Initially classed as a Corbett, Sgùrr nan Ceannaichean was reclassified as a Munro in 1981 after a height of 915 m, obtained by aerial photogrammetry for the metric revision, appeared on the Ordnance Survey map. In 2009, a survey by The Munro Society obtained an accurate height of 913.43 metres, reverting the mountain's status to Corbett.

== Geography ==
Sgùrr nan Ceannaichean is a much more interesting hill than the adjoining Munro of Moruisg, its western flank is very steep and craggy as it falls to the valley of the Allt a’ Chonais and contains two deep and impressive gullies. The fine corrie of Coire Toll nam Bian stands on the north eastern side of the mountain while another lesser corrie, Coire an Tuill Bhàn, lies just east of the summit and descends south east to the valley near Glenuig Lodge. The highest point of the mountain lies on a plateau with a number of cairns with the most southerly one being the highest point. The mountain stands on the main Scottish east-west watershed with most of the drainage going to Glen Carron and the sea at the west coast. However the eastern slopes form the head waters of the River Meig which takes water to the Cromarty Firth on the east coast of Scotland.

== Ascents ==
Sgùrr nan Ceannaichean is usually ascended in conjunction with the neighbouring Munro of Moruisg from a point just west of Loch Sgamhain on the A890 at grid reference NH079520, it is possible to climb either of the hills first. An alternative route which gives a direct ascent of Sgùrr nan Ceannaichean starts at the small hamlet of Craig (at grid reference NH040493) and follows the valley of the Allt a' Chonais for five kilometres until a stalkers path leaves the valley and climbs steeply up the mountains southern slopes to reach the summit. The continuation to Moruisg goes north east and then north along the rim of the Coire Toll nam Bian.
