= Sgùrr Choinnich =

Mountain in Scotland

Coordinates: 57.45079°N 5.20832°W

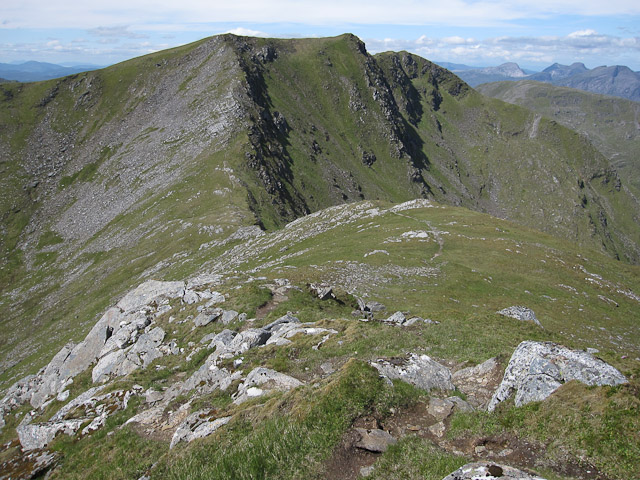
- Sgùrr Choinnich seen from Sgùrr a' Chaorachain

Highest point
- Elevation: 999 m (3,278 ft)
- Prominence: c. 134 m
- Listing: Munro

Naming
- English translation: rocky peak of the moss/peak of Kenneth (Coinneach)
- Language of name: Gaelic
- Pronunciation: Scottish Gaelic: [s̪kurˠˈxɤɲɪç] English approximation: skoor-KHURN-yish

Geography
- Location: Achnashellach Forest, Scotland
- Parent range: Northwest Highlands
- OS grid: NH076446
- Topo map: OS Landranger 25

Sgùrr Choinnich is a mountain with a height of 999 metres (3,278 ft) in the Northwest Highlands of Scotland. Classed as a Munro, it is in the Achnashellach Forest area between Glen Carron and Loch Monar. It has mostly steep, grassy slopes, with a narrow summit ridge that runs east–west. There are crags on the northern side of this ridge, looking down into the corrie of Coire Choinnich.

From the summit there are fine views of the Coulin and Torridon peaks to the north, whilst southward lies a large expanse of wilderness around Loch Monar.

The hill is often climbed along with the neighbouring Sgùrr a' Chaorachain, to the east, as the pair are linked by a high bealach at the head of Coire Choinnich. The most normal route of ascent starts from the north, near Craig, a small village in Glen Carron. A good track leads up the side of the Allt a' Chonais burn, and once across the burn one possible route of ascent is the north ridge of Sgùrr a' Chaorachain. From the summit of this peak one may continue west onto the summit of Sgùrr Choinnich. From the east, a well defined ridge leads to the bealach of Bealach Bhearnais; here a stalkers track leads from the glen of Allt a' Chonais is met, thus a circular route is possible. Alternatively from Bealach Bhearnais one may choose to ascend the neighbouring peaks of Beinn Tharsuinn and Sgùrr nan Feartaig.
