= Richard Hart (Jamaican politician) =

Jamaican historian, solicitor and politician (1917–2013)

- Born: Ansell Richard Hart; 13 August 1917; Montego Bay, Colony of Jamaica, British Empire
- Died: 21 December 2013 (aged 96); Bristol, England, United Kingdom
- Education: Munro College; Denstone College
- Occupations: Historian, politician and political activist, solicitor, lecturer and academic
- Notable work: Slaves who Abolished Slavery (1980–1985); Towards Decolonisation: Political, Labour and Economic Developments in Jamaica 1939–1945 (1999)
- Political party: People's National Party (1939–52); People's Freedom Movement (1952–62); New Jewel Movement, Grenada (1982–83)
- Awards: Gold Musgrave Medal (2005)

Richard Hart (13 August 1917 – 21 December 2013) was a Jamaican historian, solicitor and politician. He was a founding member in 1938 of the People's National Party (PNP) and one of the pioneers of Marxism in Jamaica. He played an important role in Jamaican politics in the years leading up to Independence in 1962. He subsequently was based in Guyana for two years, before relocating to London, England, in 1965, working as a solicitor and co-founding the campaigning organisation Caribbean Labour Solidarity in 1974. He went on to serve as attorney-general in Grenada under the People's Revolutionary Government in 1983. He spent the latter years of his life in the UK, where he died in Bristol.

Hart was the author of several notable books on Caribbean history – including Towards Decolonisation: Political, Labour and Economic Developments in Jamaica 1939–1945 (1999), Slaves who Abolished Slavery (1980, 1985; reprinted 2002) and The Grenada Revolution: Setting the Record Straight (2005) – and he lectured on the subject at universities in the West Indies, the US, Canada and Europe. Professor Rupert Lewis of the University of the West Indies' Mona campus once described Hart as "the most consistent Caribbean activist".

== Life ==
Richard Hart was born in Montego Bay, Jamaica, on 13 August 1917, of mixed heritage that included Sephardic Jewish and African. He was the son of Ansell Hart, a Jamaican solicitor and author of a 1972 historical study of George William Gordon. Hart was educated in Jamaica, attending Munro College in St. Elizabeth, and in England, where he was sent to boarding-school at Denstone College in Staffordshire.

He returned to Jamaica in 1937, and became a founding member of the People's National Party (PNP) in 1938; he was on the party's executive committee from 1941 to 1952. He had the responsibility of drafting a model trade union constitution as a member of Norman Manley's 1938 Labour Committee assisting Alexander Bustamante in the formation of a trade union, and in 1940 was arrested for organising a demonstration demanding Bustamante's release from prison. Hart sat the English Law Society examinations in Jamaica, qualifying as a solicitor in 1941. In 1942, he was imprisoned without trial by the British colonial government for his political activities.

In 1954, Hart – who self-identified as a Marxist – was one of four PNP members who were expelled from the PNP for their (alleged) communist views. The other three members were Frank Hill, Ken Hill and Arthur Henry, and they were collectively referred to as "the four Hs". Hart was also very active in the trade union movement in Jamaica in the 1940s and 1950s, and worked as a member of the executive committee of the Trade Union Council from 1946 to 1948. He served as Assistant Secretary of the Caribbean Labour Congress from 1945 to 1946 and Assistant Secretary from 1947 to 1953.

Hart was known to have been a close friend of communist activist Billy Strachan, an accomplished Royal Air Force pilot who went on to become a pioneer of Black civil rights in Britain. Hart once toured Jamaica with Strachan and another Black communist called Ferdinand Smith, writing a Calypso song dedicated to them both titled "The Ferdie and Billy Calypso".

Believing in the importance of popular education to empower people and raise the level of political consciousness in the community – to which his first book, The Origin and Development of the People of Jamaica (1952), was dedicated – Hart helped establish the People's Educational Organisation (PEO), which organized a bookshop and held meetings and debates, including on the type of political party that was needed. Together with other radical thinkers and activists, he then formed the People's Freedom Movement (which was later renamed the Socialist Party of Jamaica). The party disbanded in 1962.

=== Guyana ===
After the demise of the People's Freedom Movement, Hart moved to Guyana, where he worked as the editor of The Mirror newspaper, which supported the views of Cheddi Jagan, from 1963 to 1965. While in Guyana, Hart also undertook research into the history and culture of the Arawak people, making many visits to Amerindian communities in the interior. After returning to the UK, Hart initiated a correspondence with Canon John P. Bennett – the first Arawak priest to be ordained as an Anglican priest – and worked to assist in the writing and publication of an Arawak-English Dictionary. The letters exchanged between Hart and Bennett would eventually be published in 1991, in a book entitled Kabethechino ("Close Friends"), edited by Janette Forte of the University of Guyana.

=== London ===
On leaving Guyana, Hart moved to London, England, where he worked as a solicitor to a Local Government Authority from 1965 to 1982. In 1974, he was a founding member of Caribbean Labour Solidarity (CLS), together with Cleston Taylor (1926–2010), Lionel Jeffrey (1926–1993) and others. Hart remained the Honorary President of CLS, a group that "sets itself the task of informing the concerned about labour issues in the region as a whole".

=== Grenada; return to England ===
In 1982, Hart moved to Grenada, where he worked as a legal consultant to the People's Revolutionary Government. He was appointed Attorney General of Grenada on 25 May 1983. An internal power struggle in the leadership of the New Jewel Movement led to the killing of Prime Minister Maurice Bishop and the US Invasion of Grenada that began on 25 October 1983.

Hart returned to England, where he operated a private legal practice for five years until he retired in 1988. He contributed an introduction to In Nobody's Backyard: Maurice Bishop's Speeches, 1979–1983 — A Memorial Volume (Zed Books, 1984), placing the Grenada revolution in a historical context within the Caribbean, and later wrote other works on Grenada, including The Grenada Revolution: Setting the Record Straight (2005).

=== Later years ===
Hart was readmitted to the PNP in 2001. In 2004, he was awarded an honorary degree by the University of the West of England. In 2005, he was presented with a Gold Musgrave Medal from the Institute of Jamaica for his "sterling contribution and achievements in the field of historical research both in Jamaica and the Caribbean", and was awarded an honorary doctorate by The University of the West Indies (UWI). In June 2006, UWI ran a three-day conference on Hart's work, entitled "Politics, Activism and History: The Life and Times of Richard Hart". In 2011, he was awarded an honorary degree from the University of Hull.

Hart wrote a number of significant historical works over the years. He was also instrumental in the publication of the first Arawak dictionary in 1991. His 1999 title Towards Decolonisation: Political, Labour and Economic Developments in Jamaica 1938–1945 was described by Linden Lewis in a review as: "a meticulously documented text about the struggle for decolonization, union recognition, and the establishment of an indigenous political party in Jamaica during the War years. The text is part memoir and part historical account. As a major participant in the labor and political struggles of the 1930s and 1940s, Hart was both observer and actor in the unfolding drama of the process of decolonization." Hart's 2012 book, Caribbean Workers' Struggles, "is a wide-ranging and immensely readable essay that gives centre stage to the struggle for workers' rights and national independence against the forces of racism and imperialism." Socialist Review states: "This book is testimony to the courageous and unceasing struggle from below that won freedom and political rights for a population of slaves." His last published book was Occupation & Control: the British in Jamaica 1660–1962 (2013).

Hart died aged 96 at his home in Bristol on 21 December 2013, survived by his partner of more than 50 years, Avis Ho-Young.

== Awards ==
- 2004: Honorary Degree from the University of the West of England
- 2005: Gold Musgrave Medal from the Institute of Jamaica for his work as a historian.
- 2005: Honorary Degree from the University of the West Indies.
- 2011: Honorary Degree from the University of Hull.

== Selected works ==
- The Origin and Development of the People of Jamaica, Kingston: TUC Education Dept, 1952.
- Origin and Development of the Working Class in the English-Speaking Caribbean Area 1897 to 1937. London: Community Education Trust, 1975.
- The Cuban Way. London: Caribbean Labour Solidarity, 1978. ISBN 978-0950614007.
- The Grenada "Elections": An Analysis from Behind Prison Bars. London: Caribbean Labour Solidarity & New Jewel Movement (UK) Support Group, 1984.
- Rise and Organize: The Birth of the Workers and National Movements in Jamaica 1936–1939. Karia Press. 1989. ISBN 9780946918720.
- The Grenada Trial: A Travesty of Justice. Privately published. 1996.
- From Occupation to Independence: A Short History of the Peoples of the English-Speaking Caribbean. Pluto Press/Canoe Press (UWI). 1998. ISBN 9780745313825.
- Michael Manley: An Assessment and Tribute. London: Caribbean Labour Solidarity, 1997.
- Towards Decolonisation: Political, Labour and Economic Developments in Jamaica 1939–1945. University of the West Indies Press. 1999. ISBN 9789768125330.
- The Ouster of the 4Hs from the People's National Party in Jamaica in 1952. London: Caribbean Labour Solidarity, 2000.
- Labour Rebellions of the 1930s in the British Caribbean Region Colonies. London: Caribbean Labour Solidarity & Socialist History Society, 2002.
- Slaves Who Abolished Slavery: Volume 2, Blacks in Rebellion (1985). University of the West Indies Press, 2002. ISBN 9789766401108.
- Slaves Who Abolished Slavery: Volume 1, Blacks in Bondage. Institute of Social and Economic Research, 1980.
- The Grenada Revolution: Setting the Record Straight (PDF). Caribbean Labour Solidarity & Socialist History Society. 2005. ISBN 9780953774272.
- The End of Empire: Transition to Independence in Jamaica and Other Caribbean Region Colonies. Arawak Press. 2006. ISBN 9789768189783.
- The Abolition of Slavery. London: Caribbean Labour Solidarity, 2007. ISBN 978-1854650825.
- Caribbean Workers' Struggles. London: Socialist History Society/Bogle-L'Ouverture Press, 2012.
- Occupation & Control: The British in Jamaica 1660–1962. Arawak Publications, 2013. ISBN 9789769530423

== Tributes ==
- Margaret Busby, "Remembering Richard 'Dick' Hart – a historian who made history", The-Latest.com, 16 July 2014.
- Everton Pryce, "In tribute to Richard Hart", Jamaica Observer, 12 January 2014.
- Harold A. Drayton, "A personal tribute to my mentor, friend, and comrade Richard Hart (1917–2013), Part I", Stabroek News, 13 January 2014.
- Harold A. Drayton, "A personal tribute to my mentor, friend, and comrade Richard Hart (1917–2013), Part 2", Stabroek News, 20 January 2014.
- Luke Daniels, "Richard Hart: A Tribute", Pambazuka News, Issue 661, 16 January 2014.
