= British Honduran Forestry Unit =

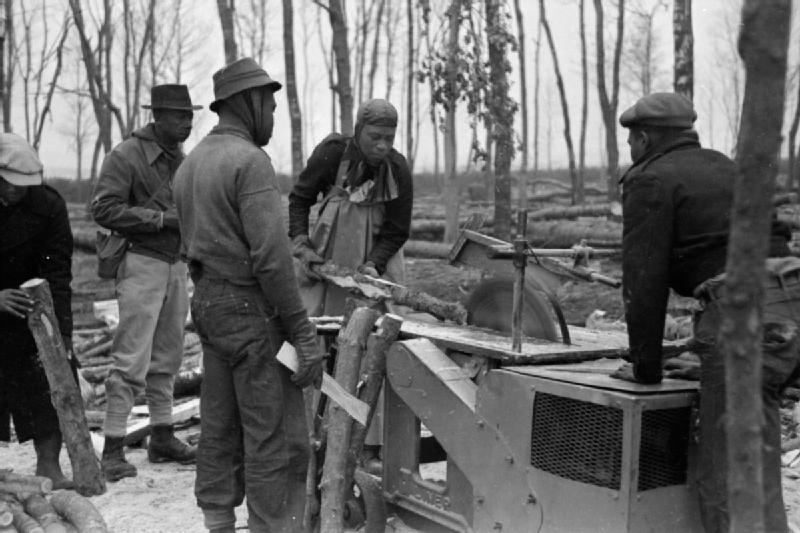
British Honduras Forestry Unit, 1941 (Ministry of Information Photo Division)

The British Honduran Forestry Unit (BHFU) was a civilian body of forestry workers who came from British Honduras (present-day Belize) to Scotland in two contingents to help support the war effort during the Second World War.

== History ==
900 workers came, the first 500 arriving in September 1941 and were dispersed to camps in Traprain Law, East Lothian, Duns, Scottish Borders, and Kirkpatrick Fleming, Dumfries and Galloway. The second contingent of 400 arrived in November 1942, and were allocated to Golspie, Sutherland, and Kinlochewe and Achnashellach both in Wester Ross. In 1943 the Unit was disbanded.

Lord Moyne, the Secretary of State for the Colonies, contacted Sir John Adams Hunter, the Governor of British Honduras requesting workers to help cut timber in Scotland’s forests.

In contrast to the forestry units from Australia, Canada, Newfoundland and New Zealand, the BHFU were given poor rations and inadequate clothing and accommodation.

== Members ==
Five members of the unit based at Kirkpatrick Fleming died there, and four are buried in the graveyard of Kirkpatrick Fleming church, with the fifth buried in. A further three, based at Traprain Law, are buried in Whittingehame H. Moss, (died 26 October 1941, aged 20), I. Mendoza (died 4 December 1942, aged 21), H. Velasquez, died 25 December 1941, aged 35. A. V. Zunica wad buried at a small graveyard close to Kinlochewe, Wester Ross. He died on 19h April 1943 aged 35.

- Amos Ford (1916–2015), forester, civil servant and writer.
- Simon "Sam" James Peter Martinez (1910–2016), forester, papermill worker and street cleaner.
