= Freedom movement =

Freedom movement may refer to:

== Social movements ==
- Canada convoy protest, or Freedom Convoy by movement organizers in 2022
- Civil rights movement, in the United States
  - Chicago Freedom Movement, during the broader Civil Rights Movement
- Libertarianism, a political philosophy that seeks to maximize autonomy and political freedom
- Health freedom movement, opposing regulation of health practices
- Indian independence movement
- Pakistan Movement
- Goa liberation movement, in India
- Zionism

== Organizations ==
- Bahrain Freedom Movement, an Islamic group based in London
- Fascism and Freedom Movement, in Italy
- Freedom Movement (New Zealand)
- Freedom Movement of Iran
- Freedom Movement (Slovenia)
- Isatabu Freedom Movement, in Guadalcanal, Solomon Islands
- Language Freedom Movement, in Ireland
- Lakota Freedom Movement, American Indian Movement
- National Socialist Freedom Movement, in Germany
- Palestinian Freedom Movement
- People's Freedom Movement (Jamaica)
- People's Freedom Movement (Serbia)
- Tavisupleba (political party), country of Georgia
