= Amos Ford =

Belizean forester, civil servant and writer (1916–2015)

- Born: Amos Adolphus Ford; 5 November 1916; Belize City, British Honduras
- Died: 28 March 2015 (aged 98); London. UK
- Occupations: Forester; civil servant; writer
- Spouse: Mavis Waugh (m. 1965; died 1997)
- Children: 4

Amos Adolphus Ford (5 November 1916 – 28 March 2015) was a Belizean forester, civil servant and writer. During the Second World War Ford served with the British Honduran Forestry Unit.

== Biography ==
Amos Adolphus Ford was born on 5 November 1916 in Belize City, British Honduras (present-day, Belize) to Amos Ebenezer Ford, a policeman and later plantation owner. Ford was one of eleven children.

Ford initially settled in Mexico where he worked as a forester in a mahogany camp, but later returned to British Honduras due to job scarcity. In 1941, Ford volunteered to join the British Honduran Forestry Unit (BHFU). Arriving in Scotland in October, Ford began working as a "scaler". In contrast to the forestry units from Australia, Canada and New Zealand, the BHFU were given poor rations and inadequate clothing and accommodation.

After the BHFU was disbanded in 1943, Ford remained in the UK and moved to Newcastle upon Tyne. Initially working at a brewery, Ford later became a civil servant and worked for the Ministry of National Insurance. Whilst working in the Department, Ford discovered government documents detailing how the British government undermined and attempted to cover up the contributions of the BHFU from public record. Ford published two books Telling the Truth. The Life and Times of the British Honduran Forestry Unit in Scotland (1941-44) (1985) and Recollections (1989), which detailed his research and own experiences in the BHFU.

== Personal life ==
In 1965, Ford married Mavis Waugh (1931–1997) with whom he had four children.

On 28 March 2015 Ford died in London, aged 98.

== Publications ==
- Ford, Amos A. (1985). Telling the Truth. The Life and Times of the British Honduran Forestry Unit in Scotland (1941-44). London: Karia Press. ISBN 9780946918034.
- Ford, Amos A. (1989). Recollections. Devon: Phoenix Print. ISBN 9780708598276.
