= Loch Beannacharan =

Lake in Inverness-shire, Scotland

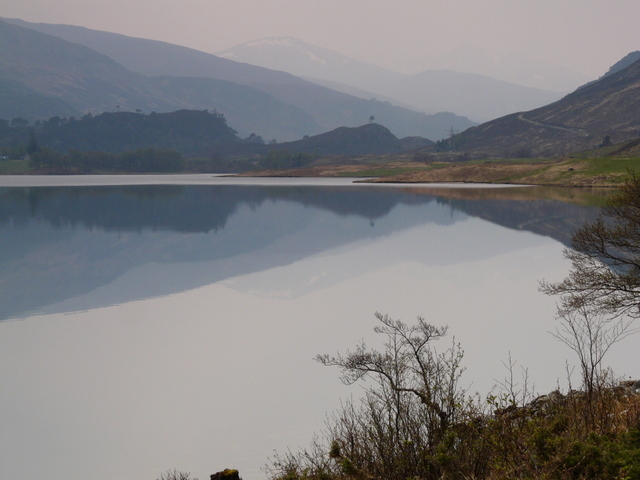
- Loch Beannacharan from its northeast shore, looking up Strathfarrar

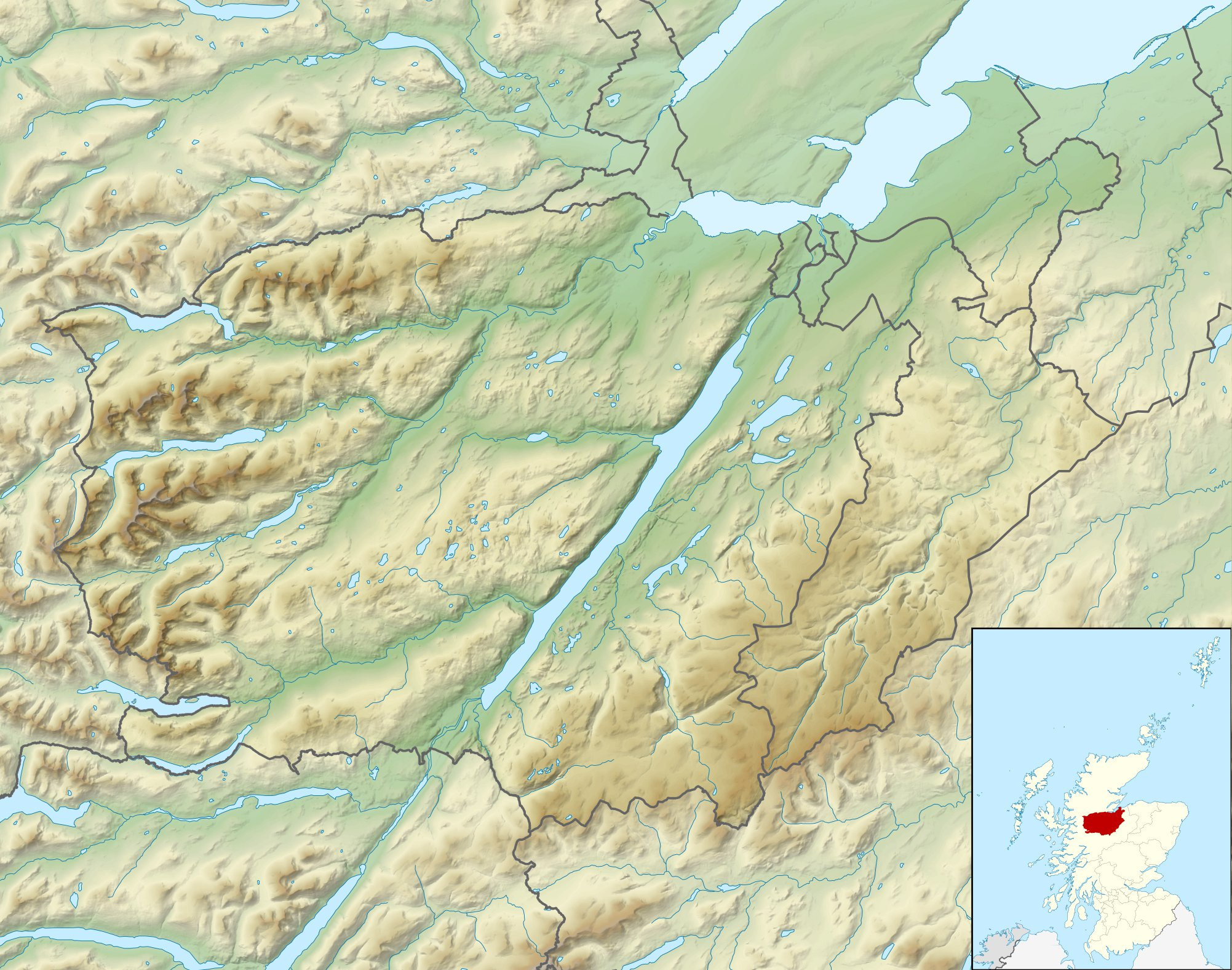
- Location within Inverness area
- Coordinates: 57°24′32.8″N 4°49′27.3″W
- Type: loch
- Primary inflows: River Farrar
- Primary outflows: River Farrar
- Basin countries: Scotland
- Max. length: 2.1 km (1.3 mi)
- Max. width: 0.5 km (0.31 mi)
- Surface elevation: 120 metres (390 ft)

Loch Beannacharan is a freshwater loch in Glen Strathfarrar, situated roughly 9.5 kilometres (5.9 mi) west of the village of Struy.

The loch sits on the River Farrar, which runs from Loch Monar to meet the River Glass, forming the River Beauly.

The loch's name likely derives from the Scottish Gaelic beannach, meaning "peaked" or "horned", the suffix -an acting as a diminutive. Hence, the loch's name may mean "Little Horned Loch" or "Loch in the Place of the Little Peaks".

Prior to WWII, most of the old Caledonian forest on the north shore of Loch Beannacharan was cut down. The land surrounding the loch is arable, and was formerly owned by the Lords Lovat but used mostly for hunting deer. Sheep were brought from Lanark in the 1950s to graze the land.

One kilometre downstream from the loch is the Beannacharan Dam, constructed in 1951 as part of the Affric-Beauly hydro-electric power scheme. Deanie Power Station sits on the loch's northwest shore, though electricity generated there comes from water from Loch Monar, pumped via a 9km tunnel.

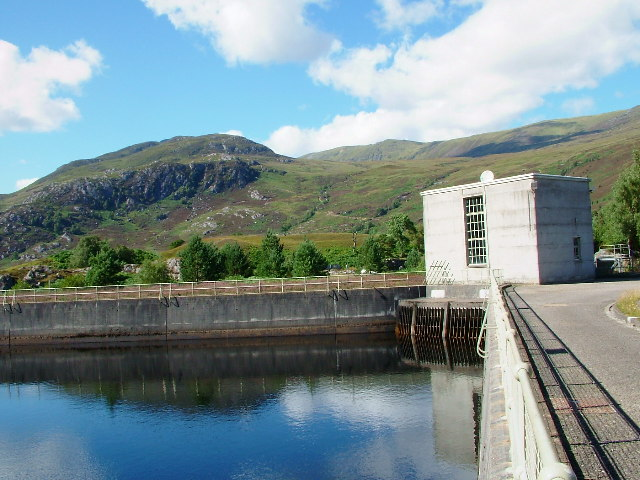
Beannacharan Dam, 1km downstream of the loch
