= Caribbean Labour Solidarity =

Campaigning organization (founded 1974)

- Founded: 1974; 52 years ago United Kingdom
- Founder: Lionel Jeffrey, Richard Hart, Cleston Taylor
- Type: Non-profit organisation; publisher
- Headquarters: London, England
- Location: Global
- President: Luke Daniels
- Website: cls-uk.org.uk

Caribbean Labour Solidarity (CLS), founded in 1974, is a group that "sets itself the task of informing the concerned about labour issues in the (Caribbean) region as a whole", and "continues to support the national and anti-imperialist fight in the West Indies", as well as being an international campaigning organisation. A 1980 CLS publication states: "Caribbean Labour Solidarity takes as its central concern the need for increased cohesion between the British labour movement and all components of the anti-imperialist and national democratic struggles in the Caribbean."

== History ==
Caribbean Labour Solidarity (CLS) was established in 1974 in north London, England. It developed out of what was originally the Jamaica Trade Union Solidarity Campaign (JTUSC), formed in response to an appeal from trade unionists in Jamaica to mobilise protests against the Labour Relations and Industrial Disputes Bill that attempted to restrict Jamaican trade unionists’ right to strike. The JTUSC comprised activists from the Caribbean community and the wider labour and trade union movement in the United Kingdom. After the Bill became law that year, JTUSC members decided there was a need for a permanent organisation to support the mounting democratic movement within the Caribbean.

Drawing attention to the links between modern racism and Britain's involvement in the enslavement of Africans in the sugar colonies, CLS continued as an international campaigning organisation. Its key founding members were Guyanese activist Lionel Jeffrey (9 January 1926 – 31 October 1993), Jamaican historian Richard Hart (who until his death in December 2013 was the organisation's Honorary President) and exiled Jamaican trade unionist Cleston Taylor (1926–2010).

The current CLS president is Luke Daniels.

== Activities ==
CLS holds monthly public meetings, and has been active in support of many campaigns and issues affecting the Caribbean region and labour affairs elsewhere in the world. CLS has led or participated in campaigns on issues that include: protesting the US invasion of Grenada; supporting the struggle of the Grenada 17; the problems faced by the Caribbean agriculture industries, including banana production; combating judicial executions in the Caribbean; the murder of Stephen Lawrence; marking the 50th anniversary of the arrival of the Empire Windrush; commemorating Claudia Jones; immigration legislation; deaths in UK police custody; the role of black lawyers in the US; the effect of the World Trade Organization’s policies on Caribbean peoples; and the struggles of the Venezuelan peoples to control their resources and direct their destiny. Recent concerns have included campaigns about the "Tivoli Gardens Massacre" in Jamaica, about injustices against people of Haitian origin in the Dominican Republic, on the Windrush scandal, and reparations for slavery.

=== Publications ===
CLS has also over the years produced publications, which include: Richard Hart's The Cuban Way (1978), Labour Rebellions of the 1930s in the British Caribbean Region Colonies (CLS and Socialist History Society, 2002), The Grenada Revolution: Setting the Record Straight (CLS and Socialist History Society, 2005), Michael Manley: An Assessment and Tribute (1997, 20 pp.), and The Ouster of the 4Hs from the People's National Party in Jamaica in 1952 (2000); Ken Fuller, Puerto Rico Libre!: for a free Caribbean (1980, 40 pp.); Leon Cornwall, The Grenada "Elections": An Analysis from Behind Prison Bars (Caribbean Labour Solidarity with New Jewel Movement (UK) Support Group, 1984, 15 pp.); Bernard Coard, Village and Workers, Women, Farmers and Youth Assemblies during the Grenada Revolution: Their Genesis, Evolution, and Significance (CLS and the New Jewel Movement/Karia Press, 1989, 14 pp.); and Steve Cushion and Dennis Bartholomew, Our Own Hands – A People's History of the Grenadian Revolution (2017).

The CLS journal Cutlass – first published in 1976 (originally from the north London home of Cleston Taylor and his wife Feli) and over the years edited by, among others, Richard Hart, Lionel Jeffrey and Ed Spring – is produced online, available for download, and in print form.
