= Chris Searle =

British writer and educator (born 1944)

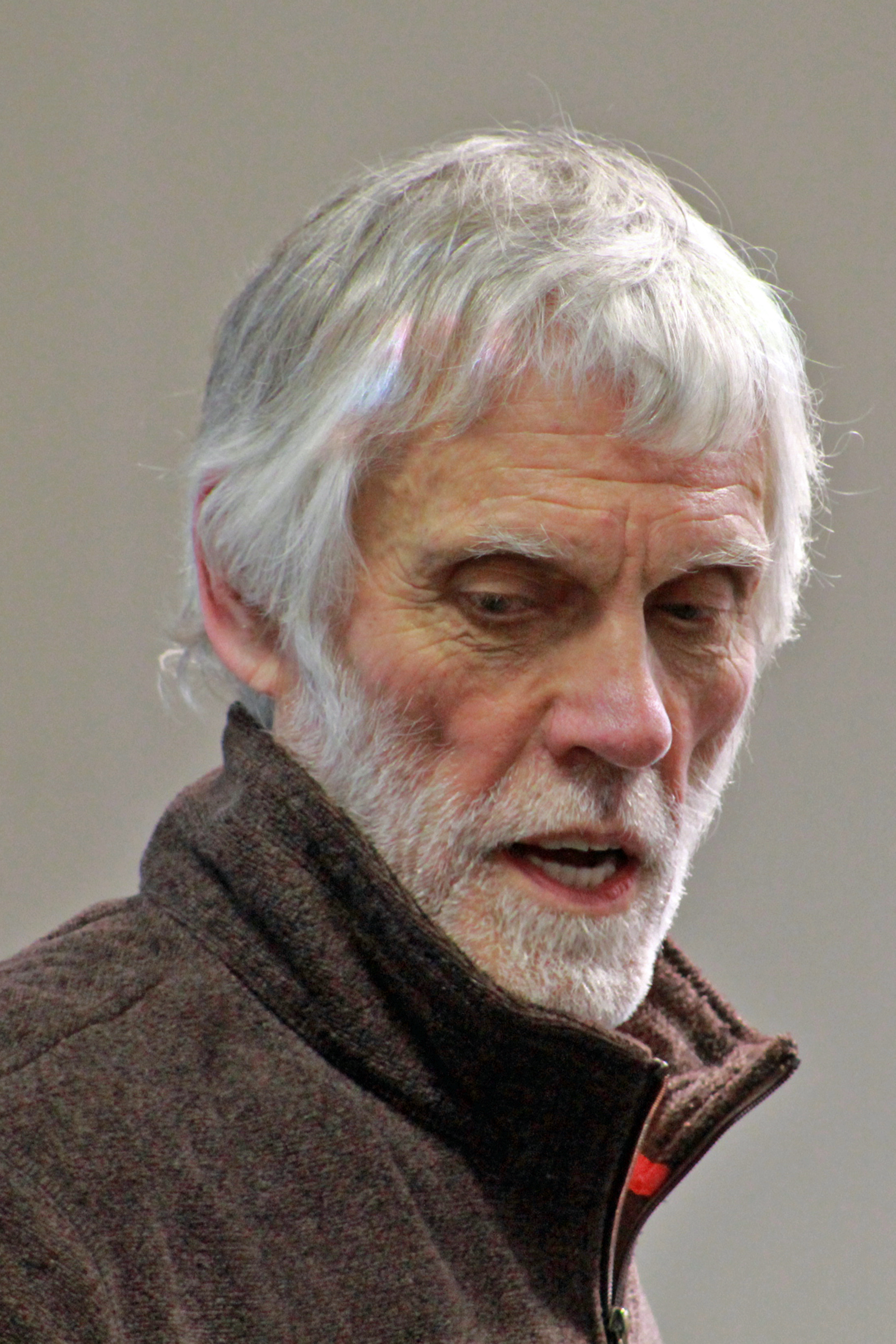
- Searle in May 2017
- Born: 1 January 1944 (age 82); Romford, Essex, UK
- Education: University of Leeds; McMaster University
- Occupations: Teacher, writer

Chris Searle (born 1 January 1944) is a British educator, poet, anti-racist activist, and socialist. He has written widely on cricket, language, jazz, race, and social justice, and has taught in Canada, England, Tobago, Mozambique, and Grenada. He has been associated with the Institute of Race Relations since the 1970s, and is on the editorial board of Race & Class. He writes a weekly column on jazz for the left-wing newspaper Morning Star.

== Life ==
Chris Searle was born in Romford, Essex, in 1944. He was a young cricketer for England, and graduated in 1966 from the University of Leeds. That year he went to Hamilton, Ontario, Canada, where in 1967 he completed an M.A. in English Literature at McMaster University, which included a thesis on the East End of London poet Isaac Rosenberg. He became a schoolteacher in Canada, and then in 1968–69 taught English at a secondary school in Tobago, in the West Indies. His 1972 work The Forsaken Lover: White Words and Black People, which won the Martin Luther King Prize, is based on his experience in Tobago.

=== Stepney School strike ===
On returning to England in 1970, Searle taught in the East End, and was involved in the Stepney School strike of 1971 in the borough of Tower Hamlets. He was dismissed from the John Cass Foundation and Red Coat School when he published Stepney Words, a collection of his pupils' poems; however, he was reinstated after his pupils went on strike in protest.

=== Later life ===
He spent 1977 and 1978 working in Nampula Secondary School in northern Mozambique during the Civil War there. His book We're Building the New School! Diary of a Teacher in Mozambique', published in 1981, presents his experiences in diary form.

Searle spent time in the early 1980s in Grenada, and wrote and edited several books about that Caribbean island, including, in 1981, Grenada: Education Is a Must! with Grenada's Prime Minister Maurice Bishop. Bishop had been involved in March 1979 with a coup by the Marxist New Jewel Movement, which suspended the country's constitution, and established a People's Revolutionary Government. Searle also edited In Nobody's Backyard: Maurice Bishop’s speeches 1979–1983.

He taught at the Earl Marshal School in Sheffield between 1990 and 1995. Later he was a lecturer in education at Goldsmiths College, London. In 2007, Searle was a visiting social sciences professor at York University, Toronto.

According to John Berger: "At his best Searle's compassion, anger and sense of historical morality as a storyteller are reminiscent of the early Gorki. I can see no other writer in Britain with whom to compare him."

== Bibliography ==
- Stepney Words (editor), 1971
- Firewords (editor), 1971 – a national anthology of children's poetry
- Poilu: a novel, 1971
- Elders: a collection of poems by elder citizens (editor), 1972
- The Forsaken Lover: White Words and Black People, Routledge & Kegan Paul, 1972 (Penguin Books, 1973)
- This New Season: Our Class, Our Schools, Our World, 1973
- Mainland, 1973 – poems
- Ferndale Fires: a children's story, 1974
- Classrooms of Resistance, Writers and Readers, 1975
- The Black Man of Shadwell: four stories, 1976
- The World in a Classroom, 1977
- Beyond the Skin: How Mozambique is defeating racism, 1979
- Grenada: "Let those who labour hold the reins", 1979 – interview with Bernard Coard
- Red Earth: Poems, 1980
- Tales of Mozambique (with Chaz Davies and Ruhi Hamid), 1980
- Bricklight: Poems from the Labour Movement in East London (editor), 1980
- Grenada: Education Is a Must! (with Maurice Bishop), 1981
- 'Is Freedom We Making': The New Democracy in Grenada (editor), 1981
- We're Building the New School! Diary of a Teacher in Mozambique, Zed Books, 1981
- Sunflower of Hope: Poems from the Mozambican Revolution (editor), Allison and Busby, 1982
- Grenada Is Not Alone (editor), 1982
- In the Spirit of Butler: trade unionism in free Grenada (editor), 1982
- In the Mainstream of the Revolution (editor), 1982
- To Construct From Morning: making the people's budget in Grenada (editor), 1982
- Common Ground, 1983
- Grenada: The Struggle against Destabilization, 1983
- Wheel Around the World (editor), 1983
- Words Unchained: Language and Revolution in Grenada, Zed Books, 1984
- In Nobody’s Backyard: Maurice Bishop’s speeches 1979–1983 (editor), Zed Books, 1984
- Calalloo: Stories from Grenada (editor), 1984
- Our City (editor), 1984
- All Our Words, 1986
- Poems for Peace by Sheffield Schoolchildren (editor), 1987
- Children of Steel: A Sheffield Anthology (editor), 1988
- Racism and the Press in Thatcher's Britain (with Nancy Murray), Institute of Race Relations, 1989
- Your Daily Dose: Racism and the Sun, 1989
- Grenada Morning: A Memoir of the "Revo", Karia Press, 1989
- One for Blair (editor), 1989 – tribute to Blair Peach
- Remember Hillsborough: a memorial anthology (co-editor, with Steve Chew), 1990
- Freedom Children: a tribute in poetry to the children of South Africa from the children of Sheffield (editor), 1990
- A Blindfold Removed: Ethiopia's Struggle for Literacy, Karia Press, 1991
- Outcast England: How schools exclude black children (with Jenny Bourne and Lee Bridges), 1994
- Living Community, Living School: Essays on education in British inner cities, 1997
- Changing Literacies (with Colin Lankshear, James Paul Gee and Michele Knobel), 1997
- None But Our Words: Critical Literacy in Classroom and Community, 1998
- Pitch of Life: Writings on Cricket, Parrs Wood Press, 2001
- An Exclusive Education: Race, Class and Exclusion in British Schools, Lawrence & Wishart, 2002
- Lightning of Your Eyes: new and selected poems, Smokestack Books, 2006
- Cosmopolis Toronto (editor), 2007
- Tell It Like It Is: How our schools fail black children (with Bernard Coard and others), 2007
- Forward Groove: Jazz and the Real World from Louis Armstrong to Gilad Atzman, Northway Publications, 2008
- Toronto Generations (editor), 2008
- Mandela, Manchester (editor), 2009
- Doodlebug Boy, 2011
- Red Groove, Five Leaves Publications, 2013
- Footprints: Poems by Peter Blackman (editor), Smokestack Books, 2013
- Isaac and I: A Life in Poetry, 2017; reprint Five Leaves Publications, 2022, ISBN 9781910170809
- The World is in Our Words, Five Leaves Publications, 2022. ISBN 978-1910170915
- Talking the Groove: Jazz Words from the Morning Star, Jazz In Britain, 2024. ISBN 978-1916320673
- Global Groove: Words of a Jazz Cosmos, Jazz In Britain, 2026. ISBN 978-1916320697
