= Al Ramsawack =

Trinidad and Tobago folklorist, author and teacher (1932–2021)

- Born: 25 September 1932; Sangre Grande, Trinidad
- Died: 25 September 2021 (aged 89); San Fernando, Trinidad
- Occupations: Folklorist, author, broadcaster and educator
- Notable work: Folklore Stories of Trinidad and Tobago
- Awards: Hummingbird Medal (Silver)

Albert Ramsawack (25 August 1932 – 25 September 2021) was a Trinidad and Tobago folklorist, author, broadcaster and educator who was the author of more than 300 children's stories and books, including the Folklore Stories of Trinidad and Tobago. Born in Sangre Grande, Ramsawack lived most of his life in Rousillac in south Trinidad. Ramsawack was awarded the Hummingbird Medal (Silver) in 2004 and a Certificate of Recognition from the Environmental Management Authority in 2021, in recognition of his environmental stewardship.

== Early life and education ==
On 25 August 1932, Ramsawack was born in Sangre Grande in northeast Trinidad, near Santa Estella Estate, one of the largest cocoa estates in the Caribbean. He was the sixth child of nine children. The family moved to Siparia when Ramsawack was 11, and later moved to Princes Town. He attended Presentation College in San Fernando, before attending teachers' training college in Port of Spain. He later returned to south Trinidad, settling in La Romaine and Marabella, before finally settling in Rousillac.

== Career ==
Ramasawack began teaching at San Fernando Government Secondary School in 1962. In 1971, he started writing and illustrating articles about local folklore for the Trinidad and Tobago Guardian. Ramsawack wrote more than 300 children's stories, and created Monkey Polo, an original character which starred in many of his stories.

Ramsawack died in San Fernando on 25 September 2021, aged 91.
