= Buzz Johnson =

Tobago-born poet and activist (1951–2014)

- Born: Norris Chrisleventon Johnson; 2 November 1951; Buccoo, Tobago
- Died: 11 February 2014 (aged 62); London, England, UK
- Education: Middlesex Polytechnic; City of London Polytechnic; London School of Printing
- Occupations: Publisher and community activist
- Known for: Founder of Karia Press

Norris Chrisleventon "Buzz" Johnson (2 November 1951 – 11 February 2014), generally known as Buzz Johnson, was a Tobago-born publisher and activist who in the 1970s relocated to England, UK. There he set up a small publishing company called Karia Press, based in east London, producing books relevant to community and race relations, and making available and better known the work of many key writers, including Claudia Jones, whom he is credited with having "rediscovered".

Johnson was involved with such organisations as Caribbean Labour Solidarity (CLS), Liberation and the Institute of Race Relations, and helped set up community support centres, such as the Claudia Jones Organisation, and supplementary schools. His other campaigning work included support for the anti-apartheid movement and for progressive politics in Grenada and Saint Vincent.

== Early years and move to England ==
Norris Johnson was born in the small fishing village of Buccoo on the island of Tobago in 1951. At a young age, along with his two sisters, and their parents, Adwina (née Phillips) and Cornelius Arthur Johnson, he moved to Fyzabad in the south-west of Tobago's sister island, Trinidad, where his father worked in the oilfields and, "having been politicised by the trade unionist legacy of powerful local labour leaders such as Tubal Uriah 'Buzz' Butler, bestowed on his son the name by which everyone came to know him."

Johnson was educated in Trinidad, attending San Fernando Government Secondary School and then technical college in Point Fortin. He subsequently worked with Alcoa in north Trinidad and with the Neal and Massey group, which manufactured cars.

He won a scholarship to continue his studies as a mechanical engineer in Britain, where he migrated in 1971, living in London variously in Stoke Newington, Clapton and Homerton. He studied at Middlesex Polytechnic (now Middlesex University) and gained a master's degree at City of London Polytechnic, subsequently becoming a student at the London School of Printing.

=== Karia Press ===
Having learned about publishing and printing, Johnson set up the small venture Karia Press as an outlet for black and progressive writers. Among his early publications was the one for which he is particularly noted, "I Think of My Mother": Notes on the Life and Times of Claudia Jones (1984; ISBN 978-0946918027), which Johnson himself compiled — the first book on journalist and activist Claudia Jones, who had been largely forgotten at the time.

Though operating with meagre resources, Johnson managed to command respect for his publishing imprint. The Voice newspaper noted:

"Fiercely independent and fearless, his Karia Press, which he ran virtually single-handed, was an autonomous voice challenging neo-colonialism, injustice and all forms of discrimination, as well as promoting self-awareness, culture and the arts.

With very little money, the publisher managed to box above its weight, publishing more than 50 books during a period when so-called 'Third World' publishing enjoyed its heyday of speaking truth to 'First World' power; demanding international human rights, an end to Apartheid, social justice.

Karia managed to more than hold its own alongside John la Rose's New Beacon Books, Eric and Jessica Huntley’s Bogle L'Ouverture, Allison and Busby, and Karnak House, the other pioneering black publishers."

The press published influential titles dealing with community relations in the UK, including Lord Gifford's independent report into the Broadwater Farm uprising, The Broadwater Farm Inquiry (1986), followed by Broadwater Farm Revisited (1989). Names on Karia's international list include Chris Searle, Merle Collins, Elean Thomas, Richard Hart, George Lamming, Bernard Coard, Ralph Gonsalves, Amos Ford, Brother Resistance, Hollis Liverpool, Sekai Nzenza, Eintou Pearl Springer, Jacob Ross and Marika Sherwood.

=== Activism ===
Johnson continued his concern with the struggles of Black people in Britain and elsewhere, as Chris Searle has written:

"I first met him when we were both involved in the campaign to free the trade union militant and organiser of the unemployed, Desmond Trotter of Dominica, who had been framed on a murder charge and condemned to hang by the neocolonial government of Patrick John, much dominated by the Geest and Cadbury/Schweppes monopolies which owned most of the island's banana, cocoa and citrus plantations. We worked closely with Liberation (formerly the Movement for Colonial Freedom) and frequently met at its north London office in Caledonian Road.... Trotter was eventually reprieved and released, largely through intense international pressure, in April 1976."

Johnson worked closely with such organisations as Caribbean Labour Solidarity (CLS), Liberation, and the Institute of Race Relations and was involved with the setting up of the Claudia Jones Organisation of Stoke Newington (founded in 1982 to provide support for women and families of African-Caribbean heritage), Hackney Black People's Association, supplementary schools and community advice centres.

Johnson was also an original member of the award-winning Ebony Steel Band in London.

== Death ==
Johnson died on 11 February 2014, survived by three children, including journalist Amandla Thomas-Johnson. A memorial service was held in London on 1 March 2014 at All Saints Church, Haggerston Road, Hackney, followed by a reception at the West Indian Cultural Centre in Haringey, and his funeral took place in Tobago on 11 March 2014.

== Awards ==
In September 2014, Buzz Johnson was posthumously given the Adiaha Antigha Lifetime Achievement Award by Hackney Council for Voluntary Service (Hackney CVS) in tribute to his work as a "community champion".
