= Patrick Grant (moderator) =

Scottish minister

Patrick Grant (1706–1787) was a Scottish minister who served as Moderator of the General Assembly in 1778.

== Life ==
He was born in 1706, and was licensed to preach (by the Presbytery of Haddington) until March 1734.

In July 1735, he was ordained as minister of Cawdor near Inverness. In March 1748, he was "called" to Urray in place of the late Rev John Morison of Bragar, and formally translated to this role in May 1749. He remained in this post for 38 years.

In 1778, he succeeded the James Brown as Moderator of the General Assembly of the Church of Scotland the highest position in the Scottish Church. He was succeeded in turn by James Gillespie.

He died in the manse of Urray on 14 April 1787. His position at Urray was filled by John Downie.

== Family ==
In March 1738 he married Anne Spence (d.1793).

== Publications ==
- The Spirit of Moderation in Religion Recommended (1779)
