= Urray =

Village and parish in Highland, Scotland

Coordinates: 57.54011°N 4.49495°W

Urray: Scottish Gaelic: Urrath
- Location within the Ross and Cromarty area
- OS grid reference: NH507527
- Council area: Highland
- Country: Scotland
- Sovereign state: United Kingdom
- Post town: Marybank
- Postcode district: IV6 7
- Police: Scotland
- Fire: Scottish
- Ambulance: Scottish

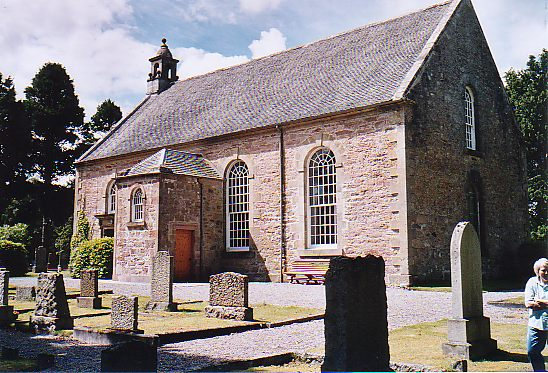
Urray Parish Church

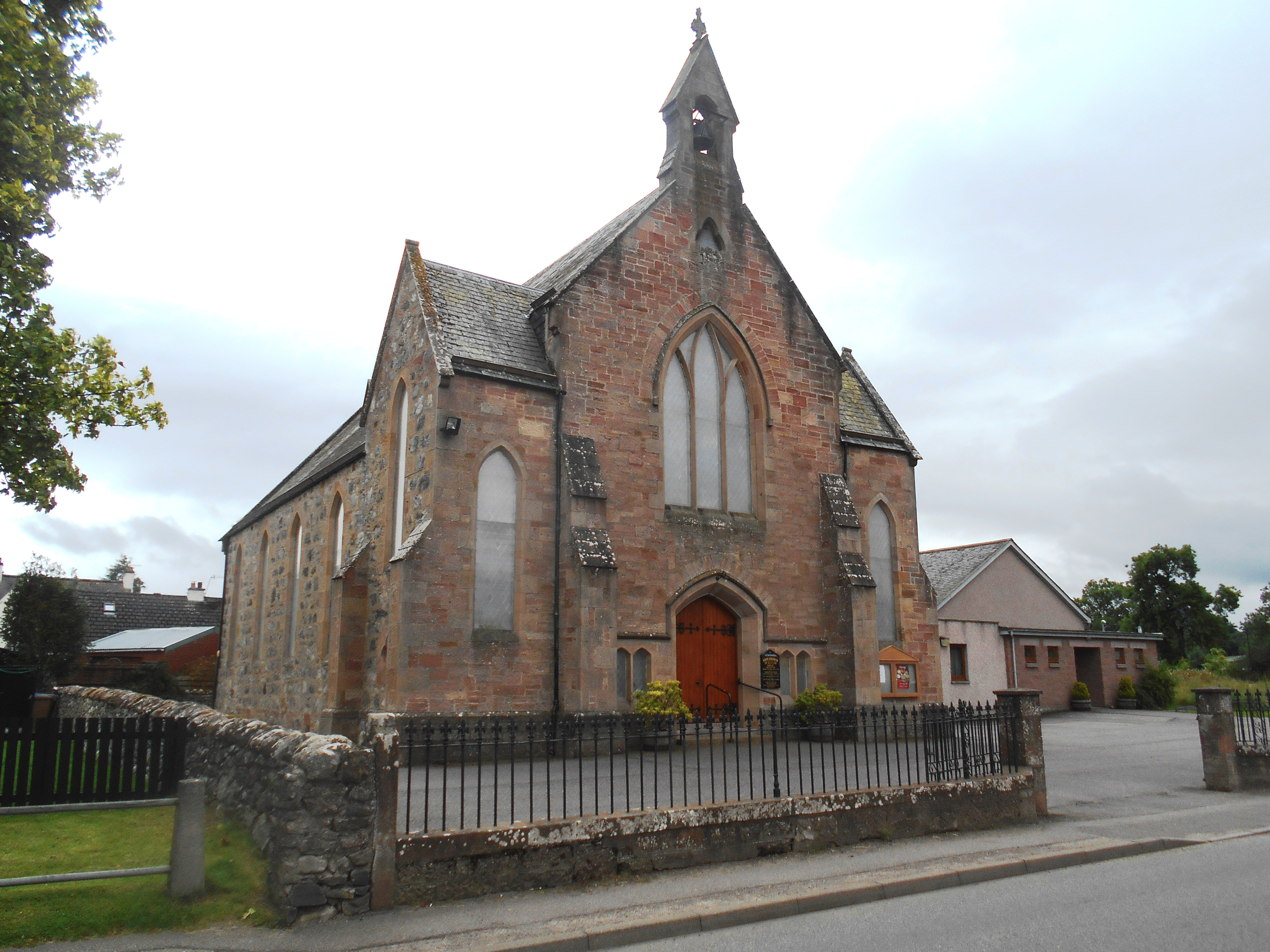
Free Church of Scotland, Urray

Urray (Scottish Gaelic: Urrath) is a scattered village and coastal parish, consisting of Easter, Old and Wester Urray and is located in the county of Ross in the Scottish council area of the Highland. Urray is also a parish in the district of Wester Ross and Cromarty. It comprises the parishes of Carnoch and Kinlochlychart, with the ancient parish of Kilchrist.

Urray is located 2 miles northwest of Muir of Ord and 1.5 miles east of Marybank. The closest town is Dingwall to the north-east.

The ruined Fairburn Tower was a castle of the Clan Mackenzie.

During the war, the Newfoundland Overseas Forestry Unit had a sawmill and camp named Fairburn nearby, at Aultgowrie. A NOFU member who died during his time in Scotland is buried at Urray Cemetery.

== Churches ==
A church dedicated to St Constantine existed since medieval times and was under the control of Fortrose Cathedral.

As with many Highland parishes Urray gravitated to the Free Church of Scotland after the Disruption of 1843.

These links provided three Moderators of the General Assembly for the Free Church (see below).

The Church of Scotland parish churchyard remains the main place of burial for the parish.

The Free Church serves the wider parish of Muir of Ord.

== Notable people ==
- Very Rev Patrick Grant Moderator of the General Assembly of the Church of Scotland in 1778
- Rev Archibald Donald Cameron, Moderator of the General Assembly of the Free Church of Scotland 1928/29 was born and raised in Urray
- Rev Roderick Finlayson, minister of Urray, was Moderator of the General Assembly of the Free Church of Scotland 1945/6
- Very Rev John Macleod Moderator of the Free Church in 1918
- Duncan Mackenzie, archaeologist, from nearby Aultgowrie
