= Cleston Taylor =

Jamaican civil rights activist (1926–2010)

- Born: 1926; Colony of Jamaica, British Empire
- Died: 2010 (aged 83–84)
- Organization(s): West Indian Committee of the Communist Party of Great Britain. Amalgamated Society of Woodworkers
- Known for: Communist politics, trade union leadership
- Political party: People's National Party; Communist Party of Great Britain

Cleston Taylor (1926–2010) was a communist and Black civil rights activist, political prisoner, and trade unionist, who was most notable for his activities in Jamaica and the United Kingdom. Taylor was also a founding member of the British organisation Caribbean Labour Solidarity, and a member of the Communist Party of Great Britain. He held close personal connections with many leading Black British and Caribbean civil rights leaders such as Billy Strachan, Trevor Carter, Richard Hart, and Claudia Jones.

== Early life ==
Taylor was born in the year 1926 in the Jamaican parish of Saint Catherine. His mother was a house wife and his father was a peasant farmer. Taylor attended school until sixth form and travelled to the United States to find work.

Taylor became attracted to communist political theory in 1945 following contact with African Americans in Toledo, Ohio, who taught him about anti-colonial struggles in Africa and how they believed that capitalism gave rise to anti-black racism. Later he returned to Jamaica, where he met Marxist political activist Richard Hart and the British Marxist Dr Audley Lewis. Both Hart and Audley had a profound effect on Taylor's political beliefs, inspiring him to join the People's National Party (PNP) and the PNP's trades union wing known as the Trades Union Congress.

== Trade unionism in Jamaica ==
Taylor organised a strike of sugar workers against the British Empire's occupation of Jamaica. The strike was crushed by armed British troops and riot squads who tear-gassed and injured the workers organised by Taylor.

Taylor was imprisoned for thirty days and then placed on trial by the British colonial occupation. He was tried on a series of charges that carried a thirty-year sentence. Despite being found innocent and the charges dropped, he was blacklisted from work and found it impossible to obtain stable employment. During this time, Taylor was expelled from the People's National Congress along with all other left-wing and Marxist members due to the influences of the Cold War. These events pushed him to move to Britain to find employment.

== Life in Britain ==
=== Joining the Communist Party of Great Britain (CPGB) ===
Taylor arrived in Britain for the first time in March 1952, and joined the Communist Party of Great Britain (CPGB) less than a week after his arrival. He quickly came into contact with Billy Strachan, a fellow Jamaican communist and one of the pioneers of Black civil rights in Britain. Through Strachan, Taylor joined an anti-colonial and anti-imperialist organisation called the Caribbean Labour Congress (CLC). Taylor and Billy Strachan formed a lifelong friendship, with Taylor recalling him as follows: "Billy’s flat became a university of the left in the UK. Billy and the Caribbean Labour Congress gave me my real education." Recalling his friendship with Strachan, Taylor claimed that Strachan would visit local cinemas and would stand on the stage and denounce the movie to the audience if the film showed a racist scene.

Taylor became a member of the CPGB's West Indian Committee, alongside famous black civil rights figures, among them Claudia Jones and her cousin Trevor Carter. During the mid-1960s and onwards, Taylor often found himself disagreeing with members of the CPGB on political matters but chose to never publicly display his disagreements and disapproved of those who did so. Despite disagreements on colonial matters, Taylor said that he had never experienced any racism within the CPGB, and spoke fondly of the vast majority of members whom he had met. Some historians have credited Taylor with bringing American perspectives of African-American activists on race to the attention of CPGB members.

=== Trade Union activity ===
Upon his arrival to Britain, Taylor joined the Amalgamated Society of Woodworkers (ASW) and began working on construction sites throughout the United Kingdom. He was elected to become a shop steward during his first job, helping to build a police station in south London. In a testament to his leadership skills and popularity, Taylor was then elected to become a shop steward at ever subsequent job he worked on, overcoming the anti-black racism that permeated British society during this time period despite being a part of an overwhelmingly white British workforce. During his life he played a role as a trade union activist; he struggled to improve the pay of his fellow workers and fought to improve work conditions and against discrimination. Fellow members of the ASW began to give Cleston Taylor the nickname "Chris".

=== Later activity ===
In 1974, Taylor became a founding member of an anti-imperialist organisation called Caribbean Labour Solidarity. The organisation's journal, Cutlass, was first published from Taylor's home in 1976.

== Death ==
Taylor died in 2010. His obituary written by David Horsley was published in the Morning Star on 8 April 2010, and his funeral was attended by Richard Hart (Jamaican politician).
