= Sgùrr a' Chaorachain (Munro) =

Mountain in Scotland

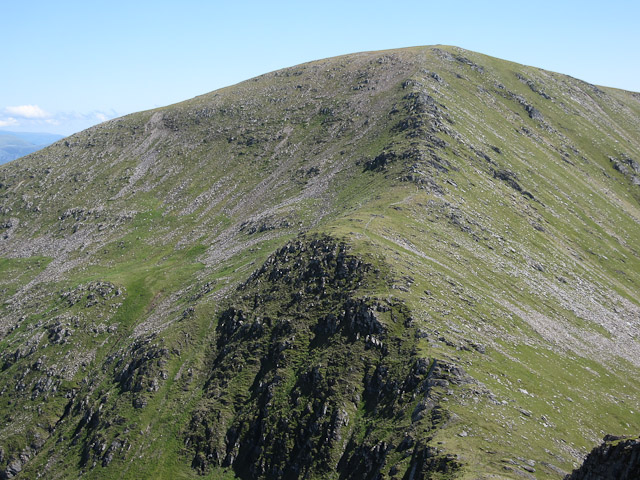
- The summit of Sgùrr a' Chaorachain

Highest point
- Elevation: 1,053 m (3,455 ft)
- Prominence: 568 m (1,864 ft)
- Listing: Munro, Marilyn
- Coordinates: 57°27′09″N 5°11′22″W

Naming
- Native name: Sgùrr a' Chaorthachain (Scottish Gaelic)
- English translation: peak of the rowan

Geography
- Location: Wester Ross, Scotland
- Parent range: Northwest Highlands
- OS grid: NH087447
- Topo map: OS Landranger 25

Sgùrr a' Chaorachain (Scottish Gaelic: Sgùrr a' Chaorthachain) is a mountain with a height of 1,053 metres (3,455 ft) in the Northwest Highlands, Scotland. It lies in Wester Ross.

A remote mountain, it is near the Glen Carron, and at the head of Loch Monar.
