= Loch Dùghaill =

Loch Dùghaill Loch Doule Loch Doughaill
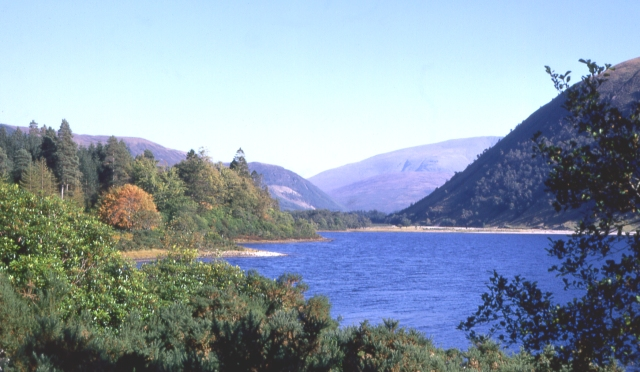

- Location within Highland
- Location: Wester Ross, Scotland
- Coordinates: 57°28′19″N 5°20′26″W
- Type: freshwater loch
- Primary inflows: River Carron
- Primary outflows: River Carron
- Basin countries: United Kingdom
- Max. length: 2 kilometres (1.2 mi)
- Max. width: 0.6 metres (2 ft 0 in)
- Average depth: 174 feet (53 m)
- Surface elevation: 93 feet 1 inch (28.37 m)
- Settlements: Achnashellach

Loch Dùghaill (also anglicised as Loch Doule or Loch Doughaill) is a freshwater tidal loch on the River Carron in Wester Ross, Scotland. The A890 road and the Kyle of Lochalsh Line a branch of the Highland railway both run along its northwest shore. Loch Carron is located 8 km downriver.

== Geography ==
The loch has a southwest to northeast orientation. The lochside contains two contrasting land features on the east and west sides, with the north side on a shallow climbing slope. The southend of the loch has an opening, containing the outflow to the River Carron, with several small lochans on the flat plain at the southern end of the loch. On the east side, the cliff face rising to the plateau of Creag An Eilein rising almost vertically on the east coast of the loch, starting beyond the northeast end of the loch and continuing down past the end of the loch, rising even higher before levelling out at Strathcarron. The slope rises to Creag Dhubh Mhor at 612 metres. At the east side of the loch, is the mountain of Sgurr na Feartaig at 862 m. The west side, that contains both the railway and road, is a shallow slope which becomes increasing steep rising to Fuar Tholl at 907 m.

== Gallery ==
Images of Loch Dùghaill and surrounding areas

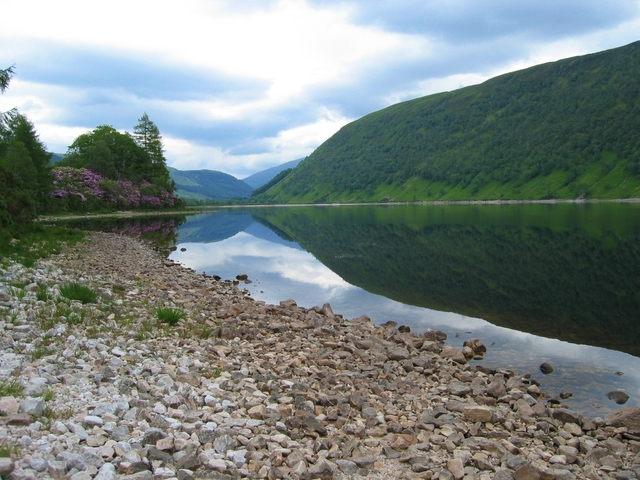
Loch Dùghaill Looking towards Achnashellach. The steep rise leading to the plateau of Creag An Eilein is visible to the right.

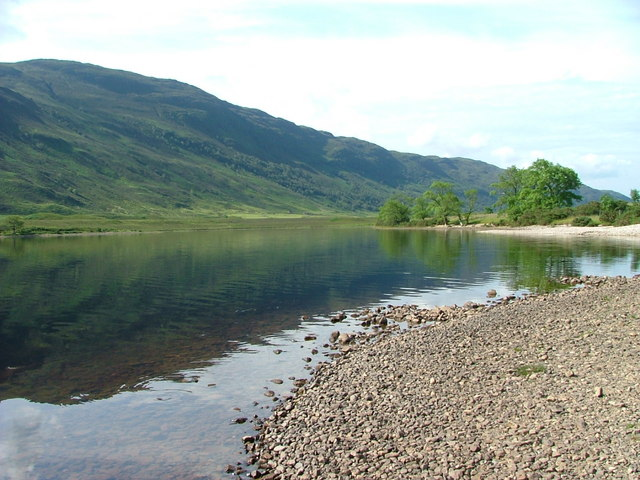
Loch Dùghaill Looking southwest from near Balnacra.

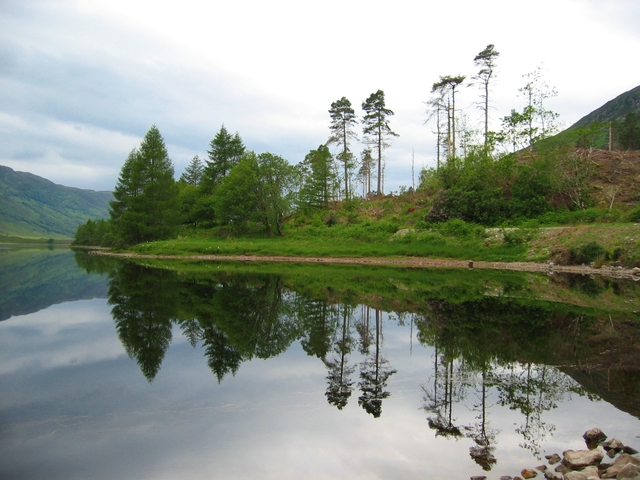
Shoreline of Loch Dùghaill Looking across a small bay on the north shore of the loch.

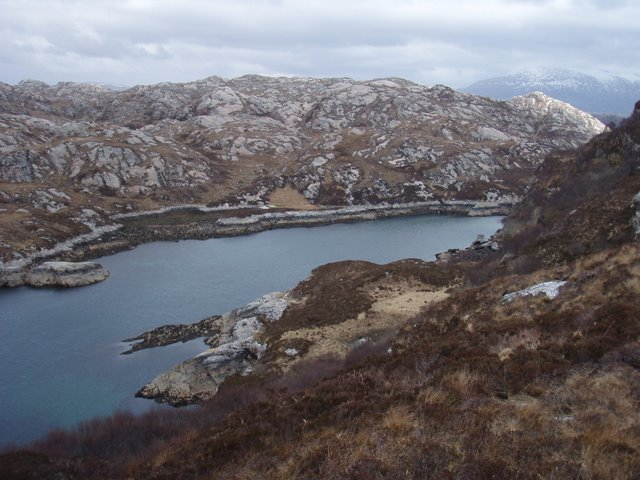
Looking down on Loch Dùghaill

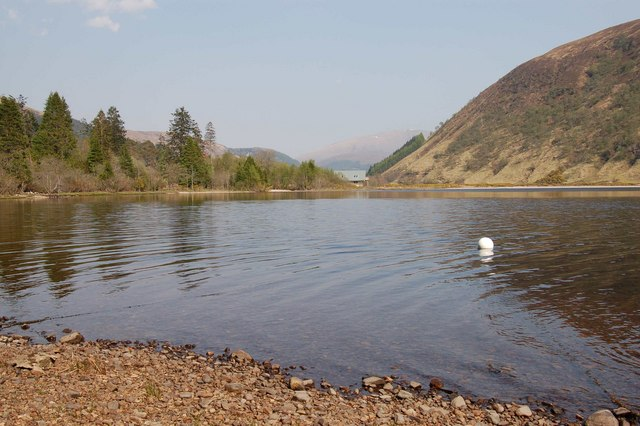
Loch Dughaill. The eastern end of the loch

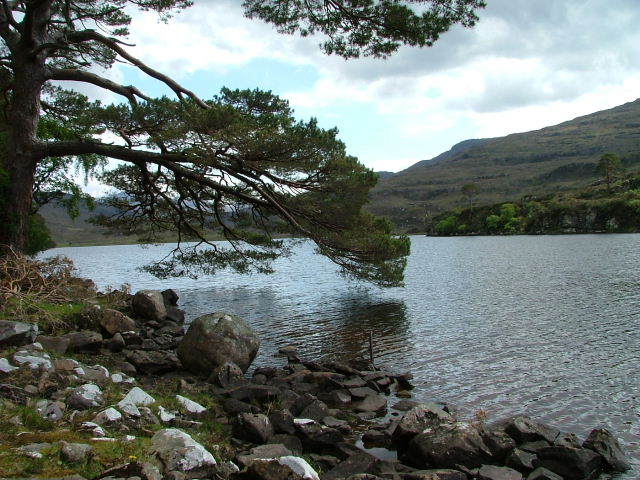
Loch Dughaill. Looking southeast from the boathouse.

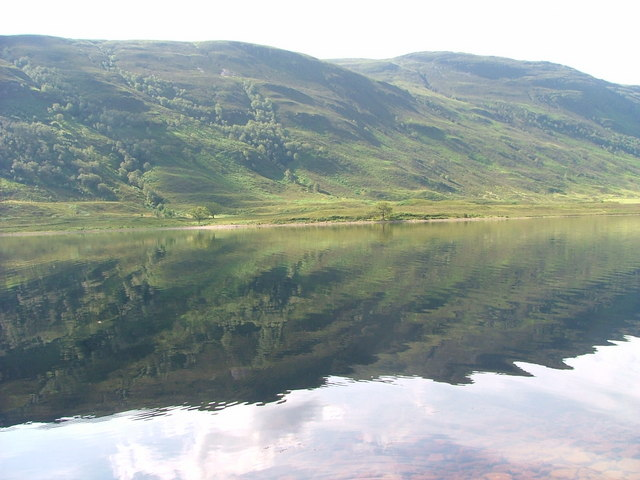
Looking over Loch Dùghaill From the shore near Balnacra.

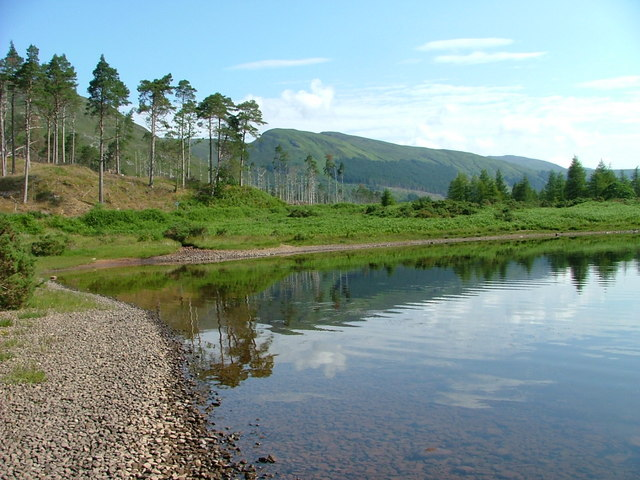
Small bay on Loch Dùghaill

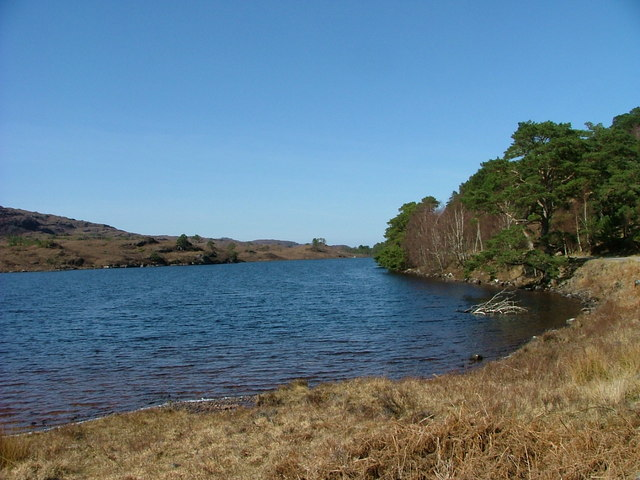
Loch Dughaill In Glen Shieldaig.
