= Archibald Donald Cameron =

Minister of the Free Church of Scotland

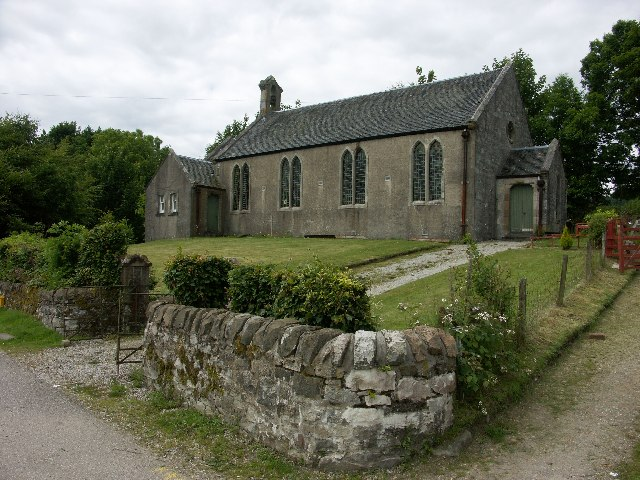
Lochfyneside Free Church

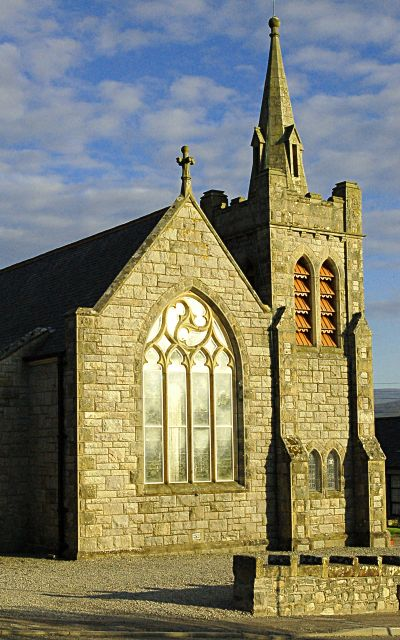
Creich Church

Archibald Donald Cameron (1866–1946) was a minister of the Free Church of Scotland who served as Moderator of the General Assembly in 1928/29.

== Life ==
He was born in Urray, Ross and Cromarty in 1866. His religious education is unclear but he was licensed to preach by the Free Presbytery of Dingwall in 1897 and he was ordained as minister of Lochfyneside in 1898.

At the Union of 1900 he remained in the Free Church of Scotland. He also then served as Clerk to the Free Presbytery of Inverary. In 1908 he was translated from Lochfyneside to Creich.

In 1928 he succeeded Very Rev Alexander Dewar as Moderator of the General Assembly the highest position in the Free Church of Scotland.

He died in Morningside, Edinburgh in 1946.

== Family ==
In 1919 (aged 53) he married Euphemia MacDonald Munro (1884-1922), and 18 years his junior, niece of Lord Alness and granddaughter of Rev Alexander Rose Munro (b.1835), in St Giles Cathedral in Edinburgh.

Euphemia died aged only 38, and Archibald greatly outlived her despite his greater age. He instituted the Euphemia Cameron Book Prize, awarded annually by the Free Church College, in her memory.
