= Achnashellach Forest =

Forest in Scotland

Achnashellach Forest Scottish Gaelic: Ach nan Seileach
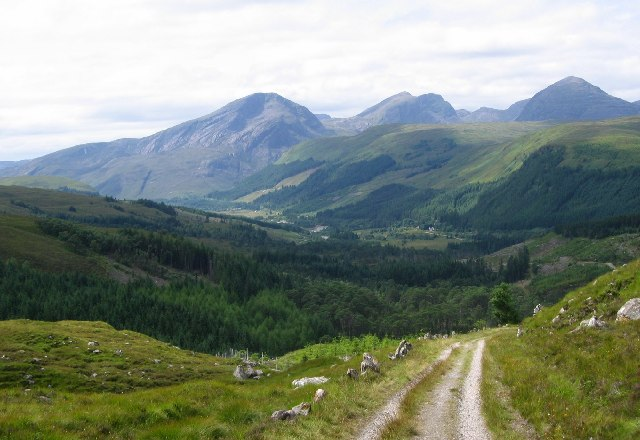
- Achnashellach Forest

- Location within Scotland
- Interactive map of Achnashellach Forest

Geography
- Location: Highlands, United Kingdom
- Coordinates: 57.48°N 5.3°W

Achnashellach Forest (Scottish Gaelic: Ach nan Seileach field of the willows) is a large area of the Scottish Highlands lying between Glen Carron and Loch Monar.

It is accessible from the A890 road, which runs through it and from Achnashellach railway station.
