= Newfoundland Volunteer War Service Medal =

WWII military campaign medal

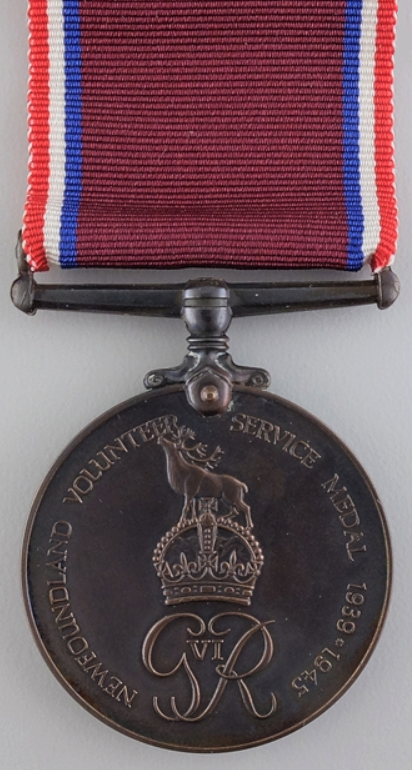
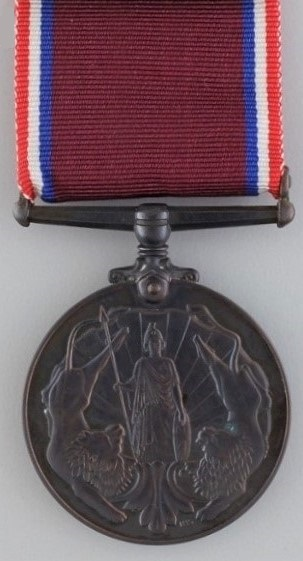
- Obverse and Reverse of the medal
- Type: Campaign medal
- Awarded for: Voluntary service overseas during the Second World War in British Imperial Forces, where no other volunteer service medal was received
- Presented by: United Kingdom for Newfoundland and Labrador
- Eligibility: World War II veterans from Newfoundland & Labrador
- Clasps: None
- Established: November 6, 1981

Highlights
- Total recipients: 7,500
- Ribbon bar

Precedence
- Next (higher): Defence Medal
- Equivalent: Canadian Volunteer Service Medal
- Next (lower): War Medal

The Newfoundland Volunteer War Service Medal is a medal created to honour those from the Dominion of Newfoundland who served in British Forces outside of the Dominion during World War II. It was issued to those who did not receive a volunteer war service medal from another country, including Canada, and who had volunteered and served in units or organizations contributed by the Dominion to the allied war effort. The period of qualifying service was from September 3, 1939 through September 2, 1945, but was not established until 1981. It was designed by Ian H. Stewart CM (who was at that time Senior Designer in Residence at Memorial University of Newfoundland in St. John's).

== Institution ==
The medal was established November 6, 1981 by the Volunteer War Service Medal Regulations, 1981, Newfoundland Regulation 204/81, and further amended by the Volunteer War Service Medal Act, 1993.

During World War II, Newfoundland was a separate Dominion of the British Empire, only joining the Canadian Confederation in 1949. Accordingly, Newfoundland servicemen who volunteered to serve with British Imperial Forces, including Newfoundland units, did not qualify for the Canadian Volunteer Service Medal. The Newfoundland Medal was instituted to address this deficiency. Those who had served with Canadian forces and already held the Canadian award were not eligible for the new medal.

A total of 7,500 medals were awarded, including those issued to next-of-kin, who could claim on behalf of those who died both in or since the war.

== Criteria ==
The medal was specifically created to honour service with the British Imperial Forces, the Newfoundland Overseas Forestry Unit, the Merchant Navy and the Newfoundland Regiment, or any other unit or organization prescribed by the Lieutenant Governor in Council. Those individuals who received a volunteer war service medal from another country are ineligible for this medal.

== Description ==
The medal was struck at the British Royal Mint. It is circular, struck in bronze and 36 millimetres (1.4 in) in diameter, the following design:
The obverse has the Crown and cypher of King George VI surmounted by a Newfoundland stag caribou, baying. Around the edge is the legend NEWFOUNDLAND VOLUNTEER SERVICE MEDAL 1939-1945.
The reverse bears a depictions of Britannia standing on a scallop shell, with a spear in her right hand and the sun's rays behind her. Two lions encircle each side with their heads towards the bottom of the medal. The rim is uniquely numbered to each recipient.

The medal is mounted on a single claw with a single-curl mounts. It is suspended from a ribbon is 36 millimetres (1.4 in) wide and consists of 7 coloured stripes: red (1.5 mm), white (2 mm), blue (1.5 mm), maroon centre stripe (26 mm), blue (1.5 mm), white (2 mm), and red (1.5 mm).
