= Canadian Forestry Corps =

Administrative corps of the Canadian Army

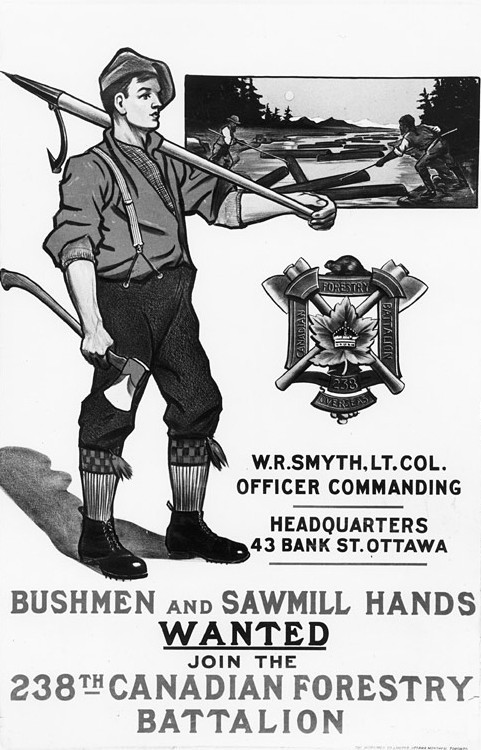
- Recruitment poster
- Active: 14 November 1916 – 1920; 1940–1945
- Country: Canada
- Branch: Canadian Expeditionary Force; Permanent Active Militia; Canadian Army
- Role: Forestry
- Size: Corps
- Mottos: Labor omnia vincit, 'Work conquers all'

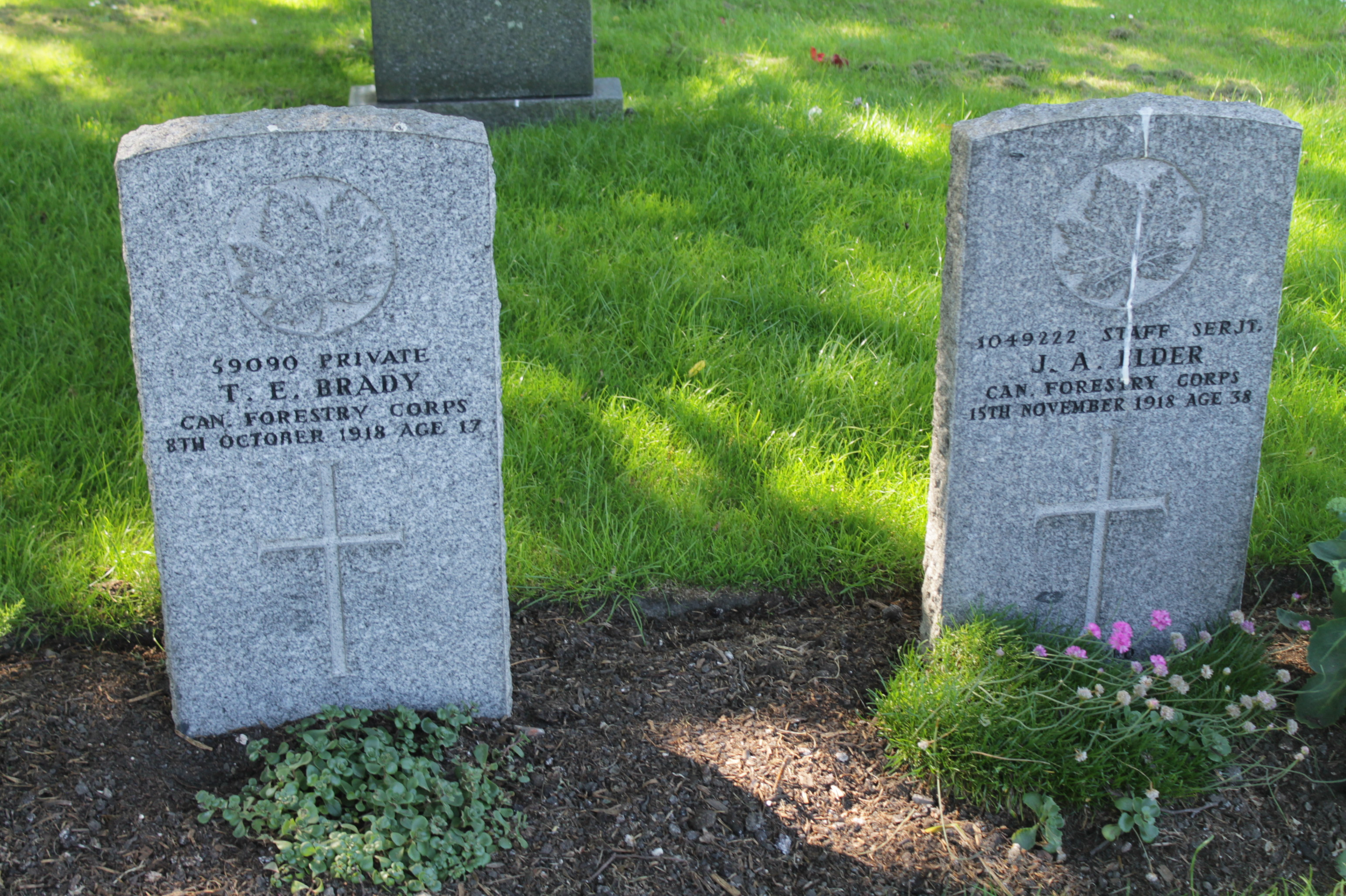
Pair of Canadian Forestry Corps graves from 1918 in Seafield Cemetery, Edinburgh including 17-year-old T. E. Brady

The Canadian Forestry Corps (French: Corps forestier canadien) was an administrative corps of the Canadian Army with its own cap badge and other insignia and traditions.

The Canadian Forestry Corps was created 14 November 1916. The badge of the Canadian Forestry Corps consists of a circle, with a beaver on top, superimposed on a pair of crossed axes, with the text "Canadian Forestry Corps" around the edge. At the centre of the circle is a maple leaf with the Imperial State Crown. Their nickname was the "Sawdust Fusiliers".

The Canadian Forestry Corps was disbanded in 1920. It was reformed in 1940 then disbanded again in 1945.

== First World War ==
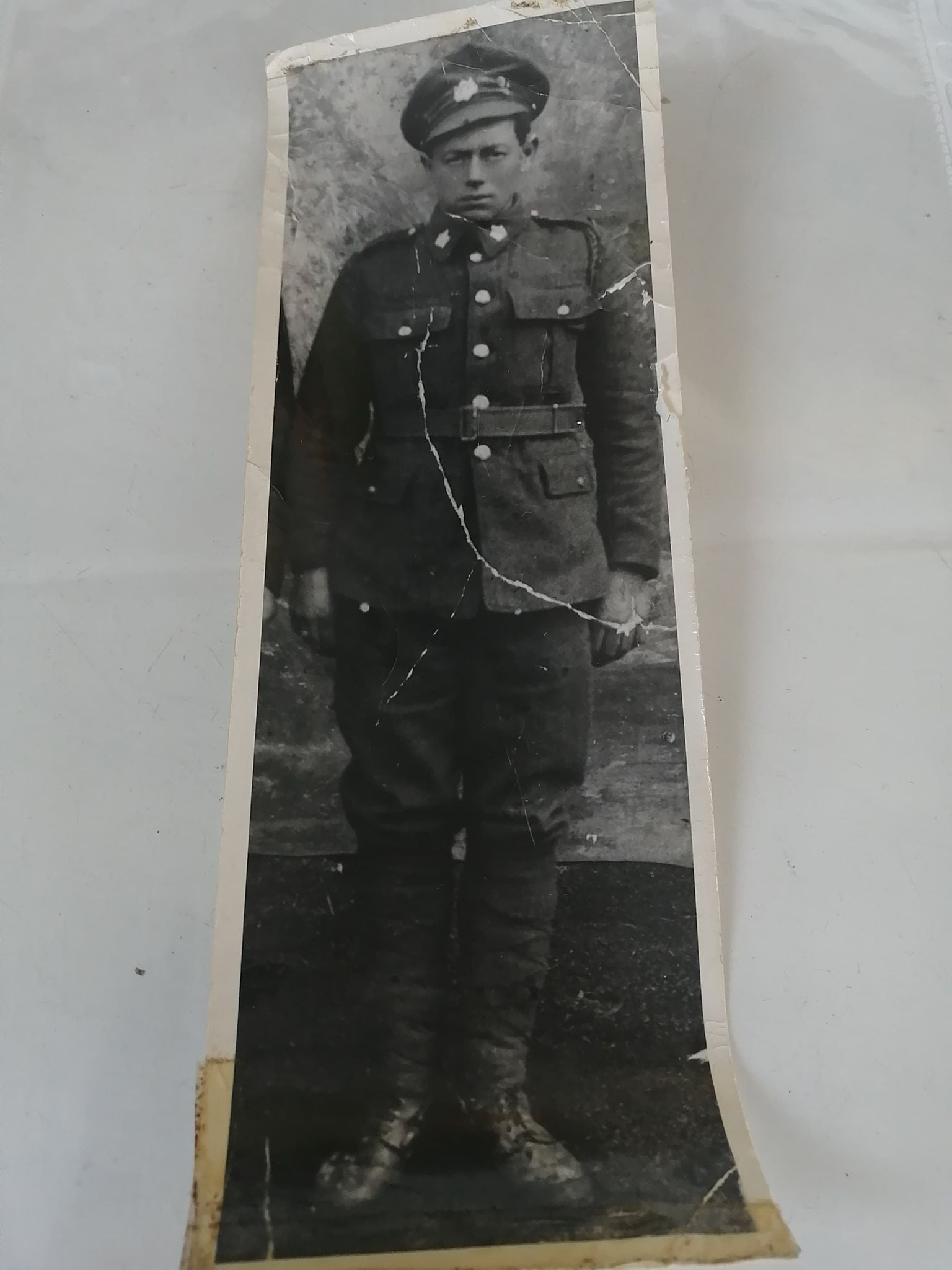
Alfred Degrâce (1888–1967), who served as a soldier with the Canadian Forestry Corps during the First World War

The Forestry Corps was created during the First World War when it was discovered that huge quantities of wood were needed for use on the Western Front. Duckboards, shoring timbers, crates, anything that needed wood had to be provided. The British government concluded that there was nobody more experienced or qualified in the British Empire to harvest timber than the Canadians. At first the idea was to harvest the trees from Canada's abundant forests and bring them overseas. But space aboard merchant ships was at a premium, so rather than stuff ships' holds with timber, it was decided to use the Canadians over in Europe, cutting down forests in the UK and France.

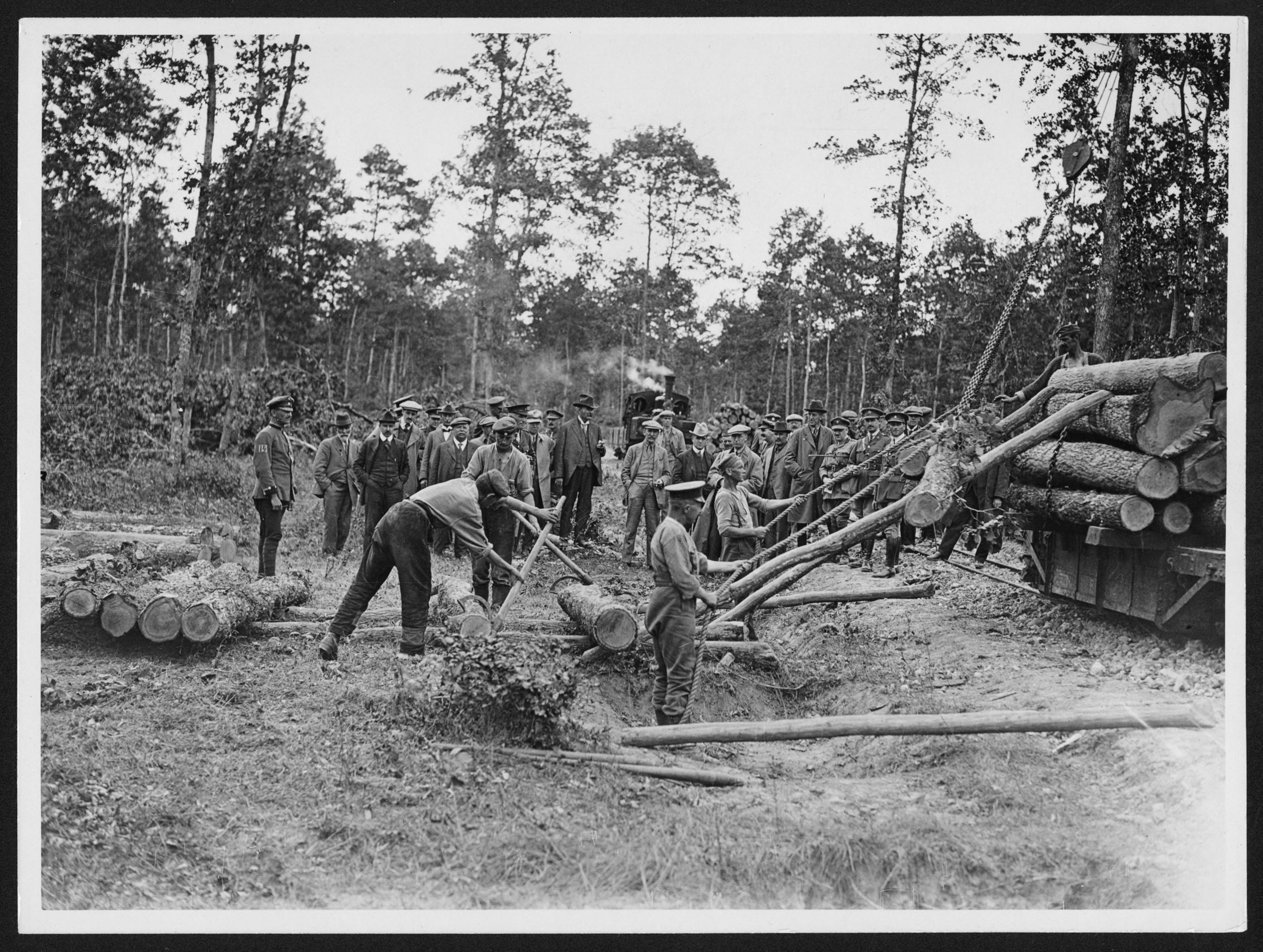
Canadian Journalists in France viewing the work of the Canadian Forestry Detachment

Several regiments originally slated for the front lines became military lumberjack units instead. Canadian troops with their coniferous-tree cap badges identifying them as the Canadian Forestry Corps cut trees in forests in England, Scotland and France, where the timber was squared, sawed and transported. The CFC also built aerodromes in France for the burgeoning Royal Flying Corps.

Two Companies, (110 and 121) were deployed to cut in Glemore, Scotland where they built multiple light railways to facilitate movement of lumber.

Altogether, some 35,000 Canadians served in the Forestry Corps, which eventually was composed of dozens of companies (each composed of several hundred workers). Although individual troops in emergency situations were sent to fight on the front lines the CFC usually served well back of the fighting. Occasionally, Forestry Corps units were employed as labour units for the Canadian Corps on the front lines with duties such as stockpiling artillery ammunition, assisting in the quick construction of rail and road systems in the wake of attacking troops, or in helping to evacuate the wounded.

Towards the final two years of the war, more and more Canadian soldiers volunteered for the Forestry Corps, as it was viewed by many as a way to serve the country without facing the German Army in direct conflict. Many members were underaged volunteers, who had lied about their age in order to be accepted for overseas service, but were below the age of 19 and not legally allowed to serve in combat. However, the Corps was not without casualties: accidents like those which would occur in a forestry camp in Canada were not uncommon: power saws, machinery and transport all took lives. Additionally, particularly during the last 100 days of the War, the Forestry Corps was repeatedly combed for volunteers for transfer into the infantry.

War artist Alfred Munnings was invited by the Corps to tour work camps, and he produced drawings, watercolors and paintings, including Draft Horses, Lumber Mill in the Forest of Dreux in France in 1918. This painting was amongst the 45 canvasses which were shown at the Canadian War Records Exhibition at the Royal Academy after the war's end.

== Second World War ==
The disbanded Forestry Corps was reinstated for service in the Second World War. They were deployed first to England, later cutting trees in Scotland and France. The CFC in World War II were only provided basic training and not expected to be in combat roles.

== Canadian National War Memorial ==
The Canadian National War Memorial in Ottawa has a statue figure of a member of the Canadian Forestry Corps upon it near the back of the memorial. The CFC is largely forgotten today but played an important role in the eventual Allied victory in World War I.

== Newfoundland ==
Newfoundland did not join Canada until 1949 but was at the time a separate Dominion of the British Empire and had its own wartime forestry unit. During World War I, the Newfoundland Forestry Battalion was formed on 2 April 1917, comprising about 500 men. During World War II, a unit was formed known as the Newfoundland Overseas Forestry Unit (NOFU) with about 3,680 men. Many Newfoundlanders stationed in Scotland in the NOFU worked on their education to be eligible for enlistment in the Royal Air Force and Royal Navy.
