= Fir Vale School =

Fir Vale Academy

Location
- Owler Lane; Sheffield, South Yorkshire, S4 8GB; England
- Coordinates: 53.407293°N 1.447256°W

Information
- Type: Academy
- Motto: Making dreams a reality
- Established: 1998
- Closed: Open
- Local authority: City of Sheffield
- Trust: United Learning
- Department for Education URN: 138925 Tables
- Ofsted: Reports
- Head teacher: Danny Bullock
- Staff: ~115
- Gender: Coeducational
- Age: Year 7 Age 11 to Year 11 Age 16
- Enrolment: ~1018
- Publication: Fir Vale Newsletter
- Website: Fir Vale Academy

Fir Vale Academy is a comprehensive secondary school in Sheffield, South Yorkshire, England.

== History ==
The previous Fir Vale School was opened in 1998 and formally opened in 2004 by the Elizabeth II and Prince Philip, Duke of Edinburgh. The present converted Academy School was formed in 2012, and accepts approximately 1000 pupils from the local area.

The present Fir Vale Academy school was judged Grade 2 'Good' in its 2015 Ofsted report following a Grade 3 'Requires Improvement' judgement in 2013.

Fir Vale is one of 300 national Leading Edge schools in the country. A new building project began in December 2010 which was finished in December 2011; a new teaching block was constructed and existing spaces were converted, allowing the annual intake to increase from 150 to 210 students. The main school is a PFI build.

In September 2018 a large fight outside the school gates required more than 15 police vehicles, dog teams and a police helicopter to disperse. Two people were injured.

In July 2025, the school became part of the United Learning trust, as Fir Vale Academy.

== Academic performance ==
In 2015 the school Progress 8 figure was +0.2; 78% of pupils made 3 or more Levels of Progress in English and 23% A*-A grades, some of the highest figures in Sheffield. In 2016, Progress 8 was just below national in 2016 with a P8 figure of -0.17. This placed the academy in the top 40% of secondaries in Sheffield.

== Admissions ==
The school refused places to 91 children in 2015.

The school has received publicity for work with Romani pupils.

== Specialism ==
The school is a Business and Enterprise College, and uses the Master Cutlers Curriculum started in 2014 to give pupils a skill set for employment.

The school is a Microsoft Academy running courses for staff, pupils and the local community.

In 2013 Fir Vale pupils successfully bid for a Fir Vale radio station which they now run under their director of specialism.
