= Newfoundland Overseas Forestry Unit =

Newfoundland civilian unit which operated during the Second World War

- Active: 1939–1945
- Disbanded: July 1946
- Countries: Dominion of Newfoundland; United Kingdom
- Branch: Civilian
- Role: Forestry
- Size: Unit
- Mascot: Caribou (unofficial)
- Website: http://nofu.ca/

Commanders
- Chief Forestry Officer: Captain Jack Turner OBE MC

The Newfoundland Overseas Forestry Unit (NOFU) was a civilian unit composed of skilled forestry workers who came from Newfoundland to Scotland to support the war effort during the Second World War. It was formed on 17 November 1939 and was disbanded in 1946.

Newfoundland was not the only British colony to send forestry workers, British Honduras sent a smaller number of workers in the form of the British Honduras Forestry Unit.

== Establishment and history ==
The Secretary of State for Dominion Affairs communicated via telegram to Newfoundland Governor Sir Humphrey Walwyn on 9 November 1939, requesting 2,000 skilled men who were "capable of good work with axe and hand saw" to be sent to Britain to aid in forestry efforts. The British government proposed forming a civilian unit due to time constraints preventing the recruitment, outfitting, and training of a military unit.

Recruitment commenced promptly as per the agreement of the Commission of Government, who gathered the required labor force. On 17 November, the Commissioner of Natural Resources made a public appeal for volunteers from across Newfoundland through a radio broadcast. Subsequently, on November 19, the Newfoundland Forestry Act was enacted, enabling the establishment of the Newfoundland Overseas Forestry Unit (NOFU) and outlining its operations.

Officials implemented an interview process and medical evaluations to assess applicants' suitability. Within two months, approximately 2,150 volunteers aged between 18 and 55 were chosen, numbers increased to about 3,600 during the war. Its members were engaged in six-month contracts, receiving equivalent pay to their wages back home, totaling two dollars per day or twelve dollars weekly, men had their accommodation and medical services provided for them as part of their contract however personal needs, such as clothing, were their own responsibility.

In 1941, NOFU forrester Edgar Baird told Illustrated London News that: "They are needed here on work of national importance, and cannot be replaced. Moreover, it is not easy to train a man, however strong and fit he may be, to become a good lumberjack."

Many of these volunteers also enlisted in the Home Guard, balancing their duties with camp work and local service. In 1942, the NOFU formed their own Home Guard unit, the 3rd Inverness (Newfoundland) Battalion Home Guard which was composed of over seven hundred men and, uniquely, all foreign recruits.

== Voyage from Newfoundland ==
Transport from Newfoundland to Scotland was provided by independent shipping companies as it was arranged at short notice. The first boat to set sail carrying the first members was RMS Antonio which left St. John's on 13 December 1939 carrying 300 men on board. The ship arrived at Liverpool on 18 December 1939. These men were under the command of Cpt. Jack Turner. RMS Antonio made a further three trips. Other ships which took foresters from Newfoundland to Britain were SS Chrobory, SS Duchess of Richmond and SS Scythia. Many NOFU members and their families returned to Newfoundland following the end of the war and many made the journey on the RMS Aquitania and SS Drottningholm.

== 3rd Inverness (Newfoundland) Battalion Home Guard ==
The NOFU not only supplied timber to the United Kingdom but also contributed to defence efforts. When the threat of a Nazi invasion loomed in 1940, the British government called for civilian volunteers to form a Home Guard. Many Newfoundland foresters answered this call and by 1942, their presence in northern Scotland allowed for the establishment of a Newfoundland-based Home Guard unit. On September 30, 1942, the 3rd Inverness (Newfoundland) Battalion Home Guard was formed, comprising over 700 individuals.

These volunteers underwent training on weekends and evenings. Like other British Home Guard units, the battalion was disbanded at the end of the war, with each member receiving the Defence Medal.

Defence Medal

== Forestry Camps ==
The Headquarters of the Newfoundland Overseas Forestry Unit were located in Edinburgh and in operation during the duration of the war until 1946. The NOFU were split up into districts 1, 2, 3, 4, A, B and C.

District	Superintendent (Tenure)	Headquarters
1	Joseph Curran (-1943) J.G Martin (1943-1944) Tom Curran (1944-1946)	Beauly, then Muir of Ord
2	A. R Hubbard	Carrbridge
3	Edgar Baird	Ballater
4	B. A Fraser Charles Cahill	Kershopefoot, then Galasheils
A	B. Davis	Muir of Ord
B	Tom Curran (-1944) J.G Martin (1944-1946)	Carrbridge
C	Pete Petipas	Kingussie

Each district accommodated a population of approximately 400 to 600 men. Each camp was overseen by one foreman and one assistant foreman, while a sub foreman supervised every group of twenty men. Every camp managed its administrative and catering needs independently. Essential supplies were sourced from the District Office, supplemented by perishables procured from local vendors.

There were 71 NOFU camps across Scotland with sawmills in Dounie Hill, Fairburn, Whitebridge, Grantown-on-Spey and Laggan and base camps in Kielder, Kershopefoot, Glenfinart, Glenbranter and Lochgilphead.

At the end of the war and the disbandment of the unit, many camps were taken down and in some areas there are no visible indications that the camp existed. Many archaeological surveys carried out by Historic Environment Scotland have been carried out at the sites of camps including Strathmasie (near Laggan) and Dalmochie.

== Deaths ==
During their time in Scotland, 34 members of the NOFU died with the majority of them being buried in cemeteries local to their camps. An example of cemeteries where members are buried are Urray, Carrbridge and Grantown-on-Spey. However, 335 members of the unit were sent back to Newfoundland due to injuries or illness. They travelled together in small groups between 20 April 1940 and 29 April 1946, overall making 47 crossings.

== Postwar ==
After the Second World War ended in May 1945, the British government released all foresters from their contracts, but some 1,200 Newfoundlanders continued working until Britain's timber imports returned to pre-war levels. The Newfoundland Overseas Forestry Unit (NOFU) disbanded by July 1946, with most members returning home. However, reintegrating into society was tough as they weren't recognized as veterans by the British or Canadian governments.

== Newfoundland Volunteer War Service Medal ==
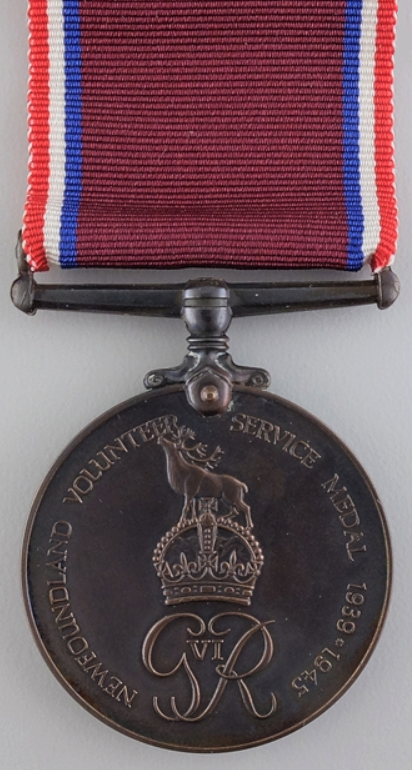
Newfoundland Volunteer War Service Medal, obverse

The Newfoundland Overseas Forestry Unit was not officially recognised by the Government of Newfoundland, however with the passing of the Newfoundland Volunteer War Service Medal Act 1993, medals were authorised to be issued to members of those:

1. who volunteered and served in units which were the contribution of the Dominion of Newfoundland to the allied war effort during the Second World War (1939 - 1945). This includes Newfoundland Veterans of the Royal Navy, the British Army, the Royal Air Force, the Newfoundland Overseas Forestry Unit, the Newfoundland Militia and the Merchant Navy.
2. who is ineligible for or has not received a volunteer war services medal from another country.
