= ModSec =

Modsec (San Fernando Central Secondary School)
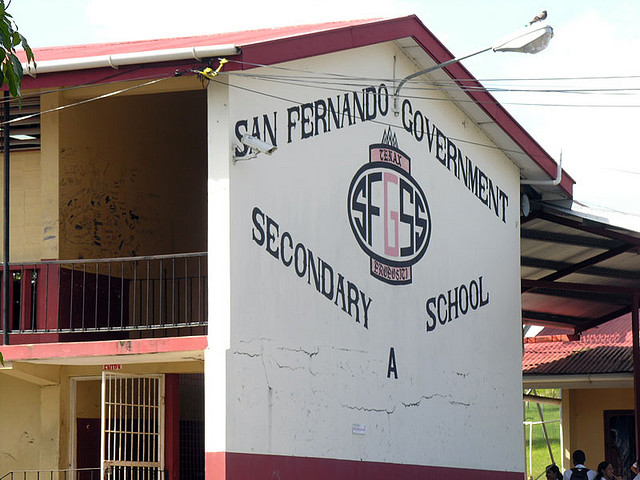
- SFGSS (ModSec)

Location
- Todd Street, San Fernando; Trinidad and Tobago

Information
- Type: Co-ed Government-run Secondary School
- Motto: Tenax Propositi "Be steadfast in your endeavors"
- Established: 1962

Modsec (officially San Fernando Central Secondary School since 2009) is a government run co-educational secondary school in San Fernando, Trinidad and Tobago. It has also been known as San Fernando Modern Secondary School (1962) (hence "Modsec"), and San Fernando Government Secondary School (1966). It was founded on the Les Efforts pond (previously owned by the sugar-cane estate) and is located at 40 Todd Street in San Fernando, Trinidad. The school was officially opened in September, 1961 but classes did not commence until 19 February 1962. In 1962 the school population was 106 students; in 2011 (49 years later) the school population (comprising a melting pot of ethnicities and creeds) is almost 800 students.

== Principals ==
The following is a chronological list of principals who have served at Modsec.

Name	Served
Aubrey Garcia	1962–1967
Ruby Thompson	1967–1984
Gibbons Joseph	1984–1994
George Ramdial	1994–1996
Deonarine Ramsumair	1996–2004
Janice Clifford	2004–2009
Joy Arjoonsingh	2009–2010
Farial Ali	2010–2013
Cindy Khan	2014–present

== Notable alumni ==
- Roodal Moonilal, former Senator and former Minister of Housing and the Environment and Leader of the House
- Buzz Johnson, publisher of Karia Press

== Gallery ==
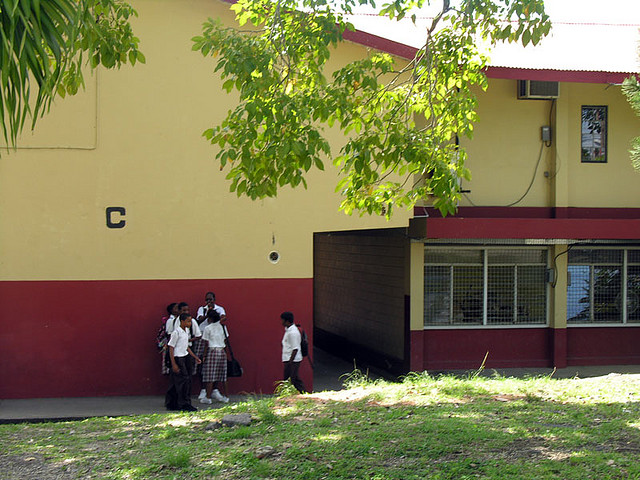

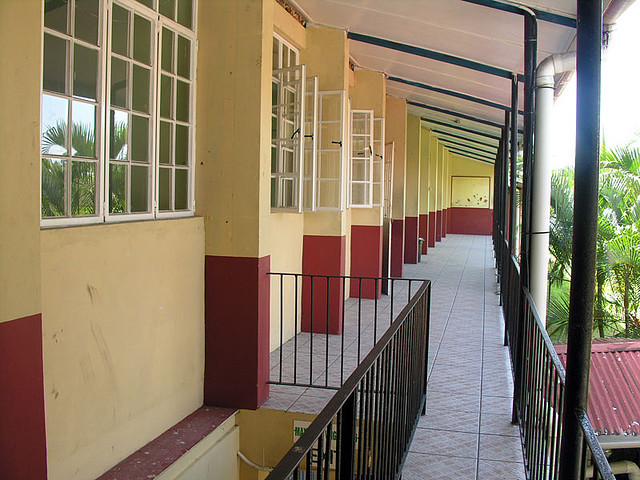

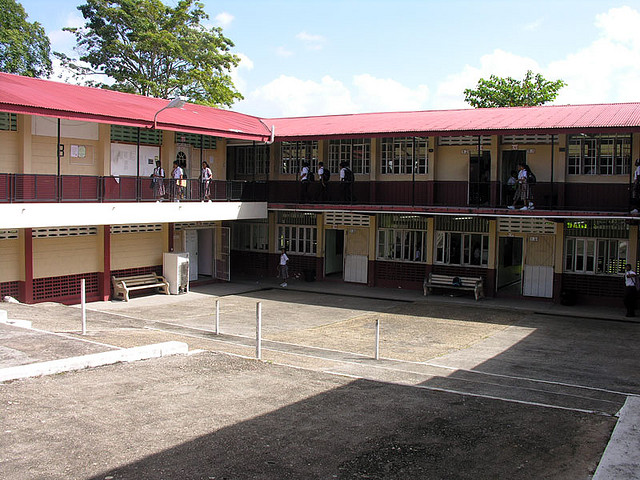

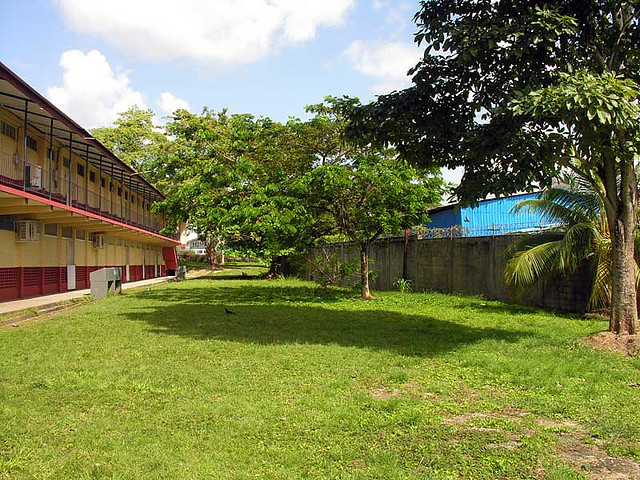

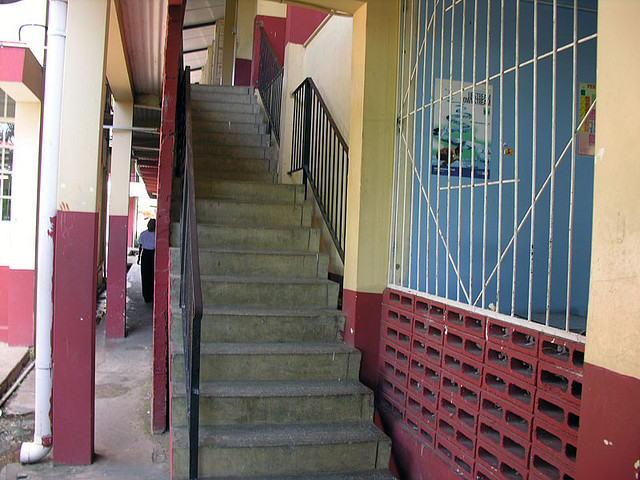
