= Achnashellach =

Coordinates: 57.46933°N 5.32631°W

Achnashellach: Scottish Gaelic: Achadh nan Seileach
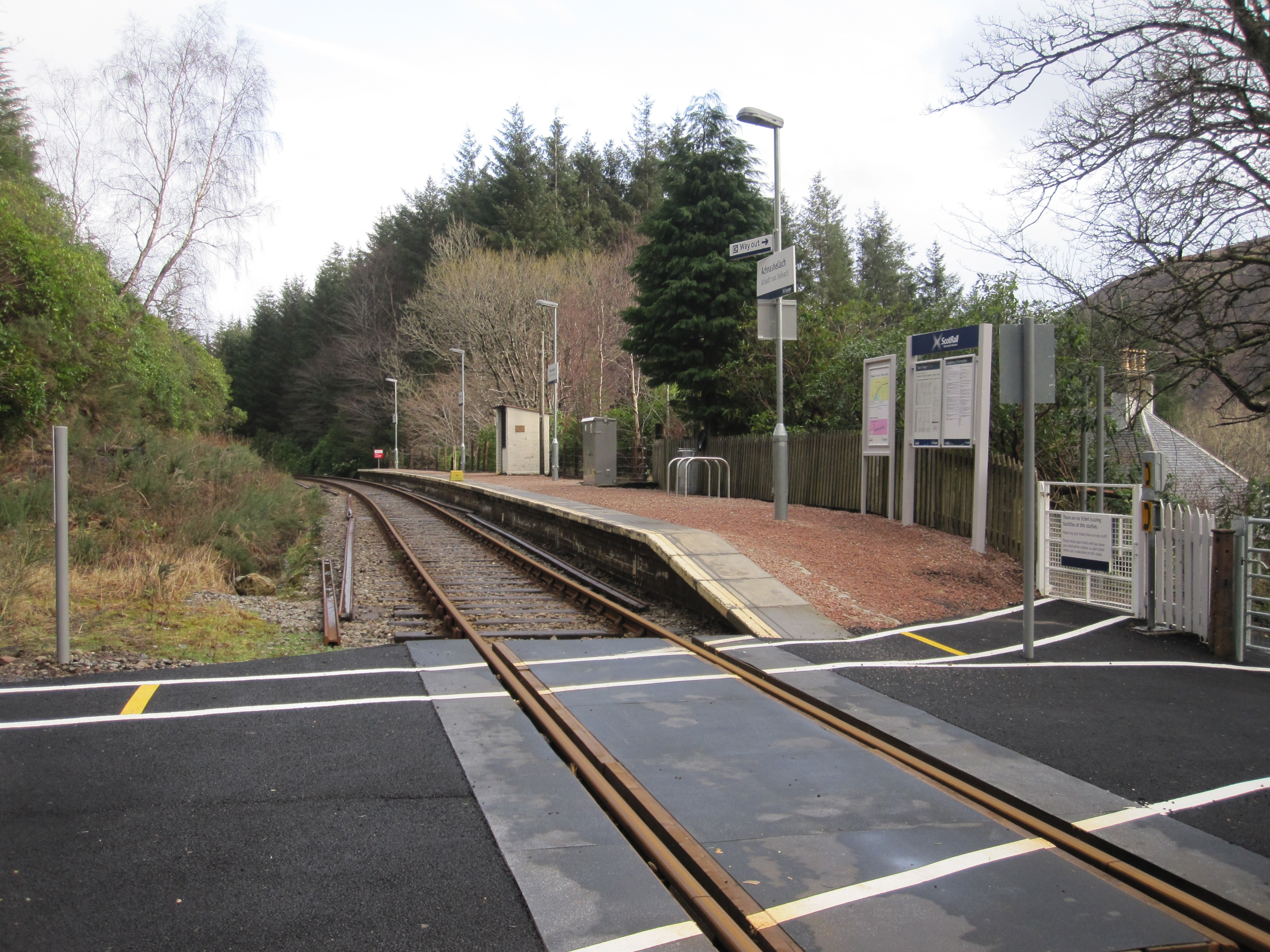

- Location within the Highland council area
- OS grid reference: NH006470
- Council area: Highland
- Country: Scotland
- Sovereign state: United Kingdom
- Post town: STRATHCARRON
- Postcode district: IV54
- Police: Scotland
- Fire: Scottish
- Ambulance: Scottish
- UK Parliament: Inverness, Skye and West Ross-shire
- Scottish Parliament: Caithness, Sutherland and Ross

Achnashellach (Gaelic: Achadh nan Seileach) is an area in Wester Ross in the Highlands of Scotland, and within the Highland council area. It is at the eastern end of Loch Dùghaill, and on the A890 road. It has a railway station on the Kyle of Lochalsh Line.

The name is from the Gaelic for 'field of the willows'. It is recorded in 1584 as Auchinsellach.

The Battle of Achnashellach is said to have taken place in 1505.

It was visited on 1 September 1773 by Samuel Johnson and James Boswell during their tour of the Highlands. Johnson wrote:

The lough at last ended in a river broad and shallow like the rest, but that it may be passed when it is deeper, there is a bridge over it. Beyond it is a valley called Glensheals, inhabited by the clan of Macrae. Here we found a village called Auknasheals, consisting of many huts, perhaps twenty, built all of dry-stone, that is, stones piled up without mortar. We had, by the direction of the officers at Fort Augustus, taken bread for ourselves, and tobacco for those Highlanders who might show us any kindness. We were now at a place where we could obtain milk, but we must have wanted bread if we had not brought it. The people of this valley did not appear to know any English, and our guides now became doubly necessary as interpreters. A woman, whose hut was distinguished by greater spaciousness and better architecture, brought out some pails of milk. The villagers gathered about us in considerable numbers, I believe without any evil intention, but with a very savage wildness of aspect and manner. When our meal was over, Mr. Boswell sliced the bread, and divided it amongst them, as he supposed them never to have tasted a wheaten loaf before. He then gave them little pieces of twisted tobacco, and among the children we distributed a small handful of halfpence, which they received with great eagerness. Yet I have been since told, that the people of that valley are not indigent; and when we mentioned them afterwards as needy and pitiable, a Highland lady let us know, that we might spare our commiseration; for the dame whose milk we drank had probably more than a dozen milk-cows. She seemed unwilling to take any price, but being pressed to make a demand, at last named a shilling. Honesty is not greater where elegance is less. One of the bystanders, as we were told afterwards, advised her to ask for more, but she said a shilling was enough. We gave her half a crown, and I hope got some credit for our behaviour; for the company said, if our interpreters did not flatter us, that they had not seen such a day since the old laird of Macleod passed through their country. The Macraes, as we heard afterwards in the Hebrides, were originally an indigent and subordinate clan, and having no farms nor stock, were in great numbers servants to the Maclellans, who, in the war of Charles the First, took arms at the call of the heroic Montrose, and were, in one of his battles, almost all destroyed. The women that were left at home, being thus deprived of their husbands, like the Scythian ladies of old, married their servants, and the Macraes became a considerable race.

== See also ==
- Achnashellach Forest
