= People's Freedom Movement (Jamaica) =

The People's Freedom Movement was a political party in Jamaica. It first contested national elections in 1955, but received only 647 votes and failed to win a seat. It did not contest any further elections. The party made a submission to the Joint Select Committee considering Jamaica's independence constitution, arguing for the inclusion of a provision that would allow for a referendum on becoming a republic. The submission was not accepted.
