= Socialist History Society =

British organization founded in 1992

The Socialist History Society (SHS) is a British organisation which publishes a twice-yearly journal, Socialist History, mainly about the history of the socialist and labour movements in Britain. It also publishes a series of pamphlets on single themes once or twice a year, and a members' newsletter. It hosts lectures online and in-person, and organises occasional symposia and similar events.

It was founded in 1992 as the successor to the Communist Party Historians Group. However the SHS is not now linked to any political party or ideological tendency, and full membership is available to anybody regardless of party affiliation.
