= River Carron, Wester Ross =

Coordinates: 57.42592°N 5.43377°W

River Carron (Scottish Gaelic: Carrann, pronounced [ˈkʰaᵲən̴̪]) is a west coast river in Wester Ross, in the Highlands of Scotland. The river rises in Ledgowan Forest. It gathers its head-streams through Carron Bog, then enters Loch Scaven and flows out from there, passing Loch Dùghaill and eventually reaching Loch Carron.

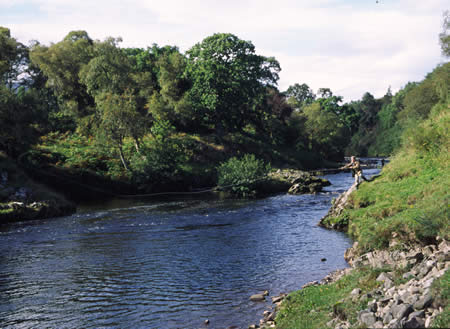
Fly fishing on the River Carron

From Achnashellach the river meanders 19 kilometres (12 mi) southwest through the broad strath of Glen Carron and expands at one part into Loch Doule (or Doughaill). About 4 km (2 mi) further southwest, it enters the Inner Sound at the head of Loch Carron near Strathcarron.

The A890 and a branch of the Highland railway, which extends to Kyle of Lochalsh, runs along part of the river's southeast shore.

Stocking of juvenile Atlantic salmon into the River Carron has brought this fish back from the brink of local extinction. Having made a dramatic recovery, the salmon has contributed to an improvement in the biodiversity of the whole area with kingfishers now established locally, as well as increased numbers of ospreys visiting.

== See also ==
- Glencarron Platform railway station
