= Loch Scaven =

- Loch Sgamhain
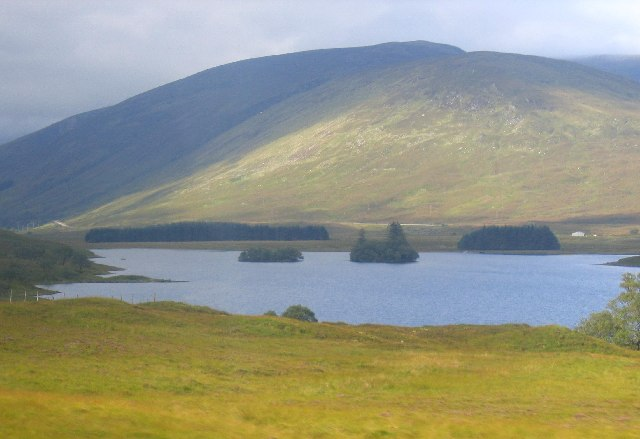
- Loch Scaven looking west

- Location within Highland
- Location: Wester Ross, Scotland
- Coordinates: 57°31′31″N 5°10′35″W
- Type: freshwater loch
- Primary inflows: River Carron
- Primary outflows: River Carron
- Basin countries: Scotland
- Max. length: 1 mi (1.6 km)
- Max. width: 0.33 mi (0.53 km)
- Surface area: 58.7 ha (145 acres)
- Average depth: 27 ft (8.2 m)
- Max. depth: 72 ft (22 m)
- Water volume: 165,000,000 ft^{3} (4,700,000 m^{3})
- Shore length^{1}: 4.6 km (2.9 mi)
- Surface elevation: 152 m (499 ft)
- Islands: 2 islets
- ^{1} Shore length is not a well-defined measure.

Loch Scaven (Scottish Gaelic: Loch Sgamhain) is a small freshwater loch at the head of Glen Carron near the source of the River Carron, Wester Ross, Scotland. It is about 6.4 km (4.0 mi) southwest of Achnasheen and 3.2 km (2.0 mi) upstream from Loch Gowan.

The loch's name derives from a local legend involving a kelpie. The Scottish Gaelic sgamhan means "lungs": according to custom, when a kelpie devoured its unfortunate victim, their lungs would float to the loch's surface.

The loch tends in a northeast to southwest direction and its shore is relatively simple. At the west end there is a significant promontory known as 'Cnoc nan Sguad' which projects into the loch on the northern shore.

There are two small manmade islands in the centre of Loch Scaven opposite Cnoc nan Sguad. The islands were supposedly built to attract insects for salmon to feed on, and there may have been a house on one in the late-16th century.

The loch was surveyed on 8 August 1902 by R.M. Clark and James Murray and later charted as part of the Sir John Murray and Laurence Pullar's Bathymetrical Survey of Fresh-Water Lochs of Scotland 1897-1909.
