= Loch Monar =

Lake in the United Kingdom

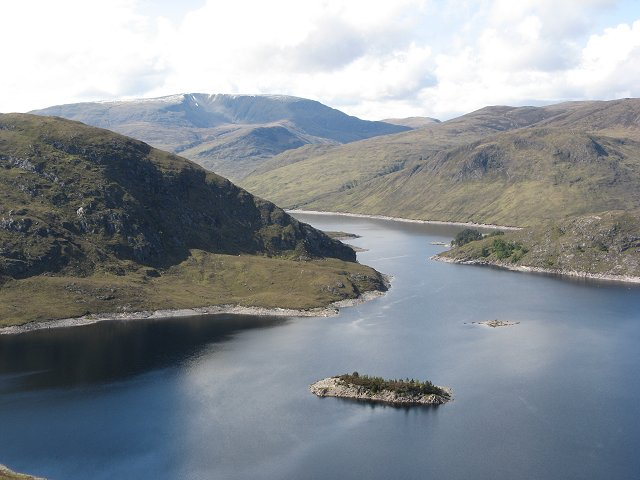
- Southern end of Loch Monar

- Location within Highland
- Location: Glen Strathfarrar, Highland, Scotland
- Coordinates: 57.42°N 5.10°W
- Type: freshwater loch, reservoir
- Primary outflows: Garbh-uisge
- Basin countries: Scotland
- Max. length: 12 km (7.5 mi)
- Max. width: 0.54 miles (0.87 km)
- Islands: numerous islets

Loch Monar is a freshwater loch situated at the head of Glen Strathfarrar, in the West Highlands of Scotland. Since the 1960s, it has been dammed as part of the Affric-Beauly hydro-electric power scheme.

The loch is fed by a number of small burns running off the surrounding hills. The loch's primary outflow is the Garbh-uisge, which joins with the Uisge Misgeach to form the River Farrar.

Much of the area around Loch Monar is remote and mountainous. This include the Munros of Sgùrr a' Chaorachain, Sgùrr Choinnich, Maoile Lunndaidh, Lurg Mhòr and Bidein a' Choire Sheasgaich.

== See also ==
- List of reservoirs and dams in the United Kingdom
