= Achmore, Highland =

Coordinates: 57.3420°N 5.5649°W

Achmore: Scottish Gaelic: Acha Mòr
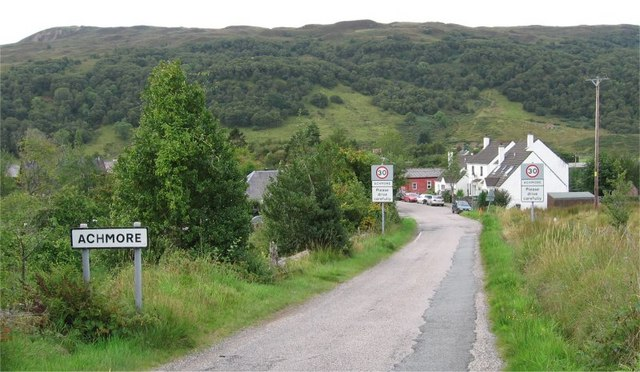
- Achmore

- Location within the Highland council area
- OS grid reference: NG856335
- Council area: Highland
- Country: Scotland
- Sovereign state: United Kingdom
- Postcode district: IV53 8
- Police: Scotland
- Fire: Scottish
- Ambulance: Scottish
- UK Parliament: Ross, Skye and Lochaber
- Scottish Parliament: Skye, Lochaber and Badenoch

Achmore (Scottish Gaelic: Acha Mòr, lit. 'big field') is a hamlet located close to the south shore of Loch Carron, approximately seven miles (eleven kilometres) east of Plockton near Stromeferry in the historic county of Wester Ross and within the Highland council area, Scotland.

It is known for its shinty-playing family, the 'Ach' Macraes, who use the diminutive 'Ach' to distinguish themselves from other septs of Macraes in the area. Members of the family include Neil 'Ach' Macrae, his brother Johnny 'Ach' Macrae, who both played for Kinlochshiel Shinty Club, and Neil's daughter, award-winning chef and author Fenella Renwick

The community lies just to the west of the A890 between Auchtertyre and Achnasheen, about 1 1/2 miles (2.5 kilometres) (as the crow flies) southwest of Stromeferry.

The only facilities within the community are a public phone box and the local Stromeferry & Achmore Village Hall mainly covering the Achmore, Stromeferry and Braeintra communities, which at the 2011 census only recorded 153 individuals. The community is served locally by the Stromeferry & Achmore Community Council.

Local children attend Auctertyre Primary School and then Plockton High School. The closest railway station is Stromeferry railway station.

The Scottish actor and comedian, Greg McHugh was married in a yurt built in a field beside the community of Achmore on 13 May 2013.

The Minister, Duncan Macrae, who served in Ardgour (1894-1909) and then Grantully (1909-1918) was born in Achmore.
