= Duncraig Castle =

Castle in Lochalsh, Scotland

Coordinates: 57.338°N 5.633°W

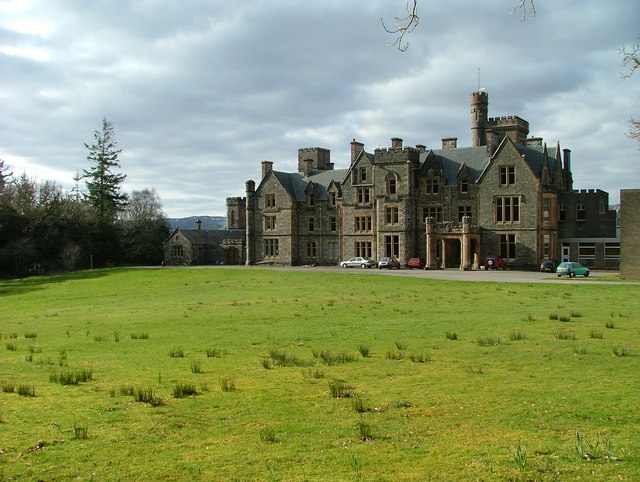
Duncraig Castle

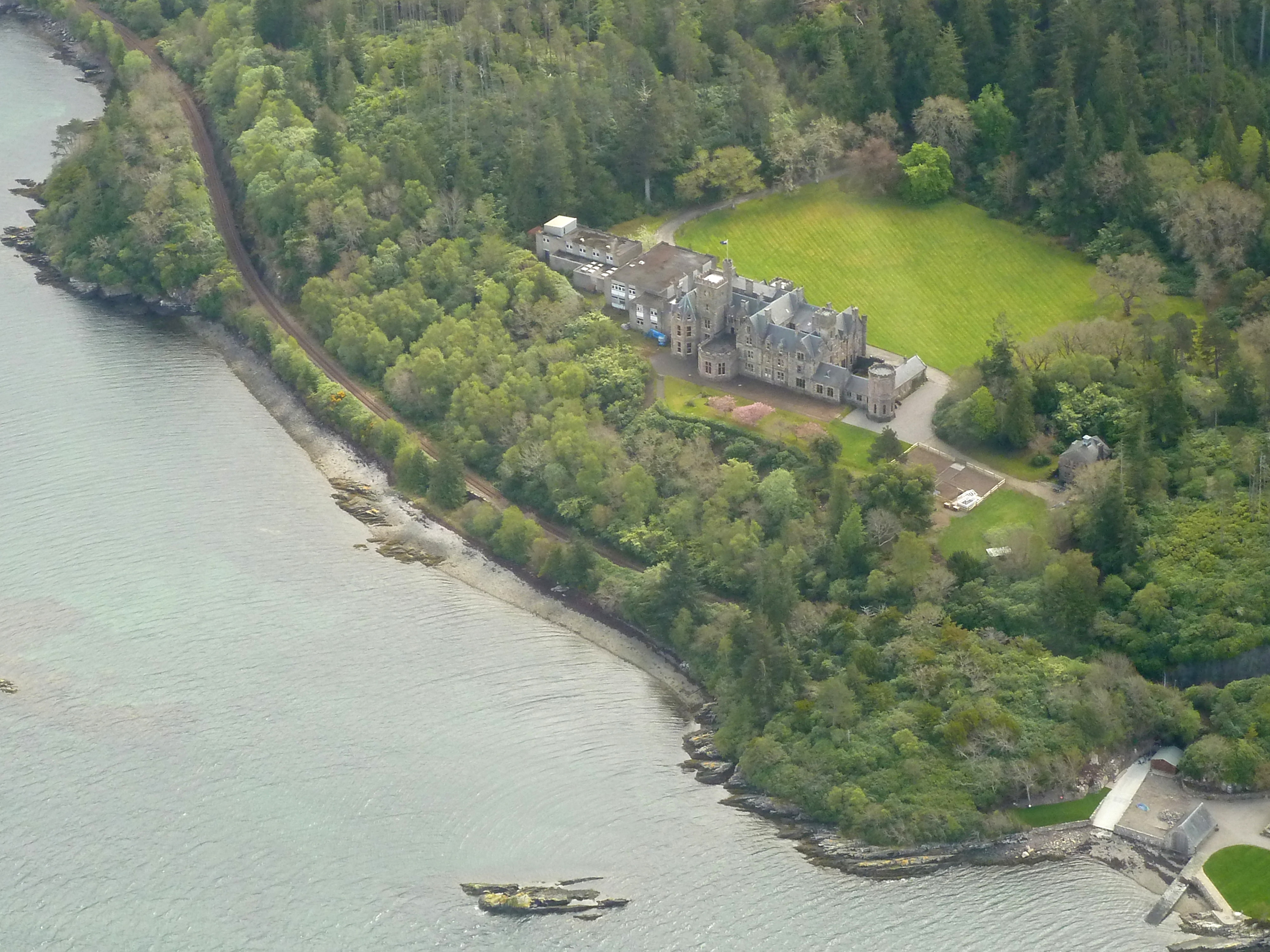
Aerial view of the castle

Duncraig Castle is a mansion in Lochalsh, in the west of the Scottish Highlands. A category-C listed building, it is situated in the Highland council area, east of the village of Plockton on the south shore of Loch Carron. It was built in 1866 in the Scottish baronial style, to designs by Alexander Ross, for Scottish Member of Parliament and businessman Alexander Matheson. The castle remained in the Matheson family until the 1920s, when it was sold to Sir Daniel Hamilton and his wife Margaret, who owned the neighbouring estate. The Hamiltons intended to use the castle for educational purposes in the local community, but this never came to fruition and following the outbreak of World War II, the castle was used as a naval hospital. By the end of the war, Daniel Hamilton had died, and Margaret bequeathed the castle to the local council, which converted it for use as a home economics college for girls, operating in this capacity until its closure in 1989.

After standing derelict for more than a decade, the castle was bought by the Dobson family of England in 2002, seventeen of whom moved in. Faced with huge renovation costs, the family had several disputes, and sold their story to a television company, who produced a five-part series which aired on BBC1. In 2009, after most of the family had moved away, the Dobsons sold the castle. It was bought with the intention of converting it to a bed and breakfast, which operated for two years but then closed, as the castle remained in need of major renovation. The castle operated as a Bed and Breakfast and wedding venue in 2021 and 2022. It was sold into private ownership in late 2022 and the bed and breakfast is permanently closed.

The castle is served by Duncraig railway station, on the Kyle of Lochalsh line. This was originally opened in 1897 as a private station, and is now open to the public.

== Description ==
Duncraig Castle is located on Loch Carron, part of the west coast of Scotland, in the Highlands. It is on the northern shore of the Lochalsh peninsula, northeast of the town of Kyle of Lochalsh and east of the Isle of Skye. It is close to the village of Plockton.

The three-storey building was constructed in the Scottish baronial style, and has an asymmetrical nine-bay layout with gables and crenellations. The building has eighty rooms including a large dining room, and features a chapel as well as an octagonal water tower and a large modern extension. It has been designated as a category-C listed building since 1982.

The castle's estate consists of 40 acres (16 hectares) of land, much of it forest, as well as a boathouse and two private islands. The castle is operated as a bed and breakfast as well as being the home of the owner and her family, although as of 2020 the B&B is yet to reopen following extensive renovation work.

The castle is served by Duncraig railway station, which is unstaffed and operated by ScotRail. It is on the Kyle of Lochalsh line, which runs from Inverness to Kyle of Lochalsh, lying between Stromeferry and Plockton on that line. The station features a single concrete platform and an unusual hexagonal shelter with pyramid-shaped roof. The station received a category-B listing in 1997.

== History ==
Duncraig Castle was built in 1866 by Sir Alexander Matheson, who had returned to Britain after making a large sum of money through the Chinese opium trade, as a country home suitable for hosting large gatherings. The building is located close to the Mathesons' family seat at Attadale, and was designed by the architect Alexander Ross. Matheson died in 1886 and the castle initially remained with his family, who rented it to wealthy tenants continuing its use as a hosting venue for summer entertainment.

In 1897, the Highland Railway built the Kyle of Lochalsh Extension to their existing line to Stromeferry, which included a dedicated station for Duncraig Castle. At the time of opening, it was a private-use only station for the Matheson family, but it later opened for public use.

By the 1920s the Matheson family were in financial difficulty and they sold the castle to Sir Daniel Hamilton and his wife Lady Margaret Hamilton, owners of the neighbouring Balmacara Estate. The Hamiltons, supporters of social reform, planned to use the castle as a community education centre for local people to receive training in activities such as weaving. In 1938 the local authority began discussions with the Hamiltons about using the castle for education purposes, but these did not come to fruition before the outbreak of World War II in 1939. Sir Daniel Hamilton died during the early stages of the war, and the castle was used during the hostilities by the government, as a naval hospital.

At the end of the war, Lady Margaret Hamilton, whose principal residence was at Balmacara House, bequeathed the castle to Ross-shire council, for use as a technical school for the Highlands. The building went on to be operated by the education authority as a home economics college for girls. A wing was added in modernist style in 1969, and the council made other alterations such as the removal of fireplaces and installation of a central heating system throughout the building. The college closed in 1989 and the building remained empty and neglected for the next fourteen years, apart from a period in the mid-1990s during which it was used as a base for the filming crew of the BBC comedy-mystery-drama Hamish Macbeth.

In 2002, the castle was bought by Sam and Perlin Dobson, a couple who ran a business in Nottingham, England. Seventeen members of the Dobsons' extended family moved into the castle in the summer of 2003, including Sam and Perlin's daughter as well as Sam's parents and three of his siblings, each bringing their own spouses and children, leaving jobs in England and occupying a different wing of the castle. The castle was in need of major renovation at the time, with none of its bathrooms operational and several collapsed ceilings, and the Dobsons found they had to spend large sums of money and devote much of their time to repair work. This burden, coupled with the difficulty of living in a derelict building through the winter months, caused increasing disputes amongst the family. They decided to sell their story to a television company, which filmed the family's lives during their first year in the castle and produced a five-part reality television series called The Dobsons of Duncraig, which aired on BBC1 from December 2004. The stress and financial pressures of renovating the castle took its toll on the family and by 2008 only Sam and Perlin's family were still residing there, after the other siblings had left, and Sam's parents evicted following a court order. In 2009 the Dobsons decided to sell the castle and move on.

The castle was bought from the Dobson family by Suzanne Hazeldine, who began operating a bed and breakfast in the castle. After opening and running the B&B operations in the existing building for two years, she closed the castle in 2010 to renovate and convert it into luxury accommodation. The work was still in progress in 2016, when Hazeldine informed The Press and Journal newspaper that she had given the building a "complete overhaul". The reopening was planned at the time for the spring of 2017, but it had still not reopened by 2020. As of 2021, the castle was once again open for bed and breakfast or weddings.

The 40 acre property was listed for sale in August 2022 described as a "15 bedroom coastal castle ... with additional coach house, private island, jetty and boathouse". Of the bedrooms, 12 could be let out, each with an en suite bathroom.
