= Duncraig =

Duncraig may refer to:

- Duncraig Castle in Scotland
  - Duncraig railway station, near this castle
- Duncraig, Western Australia, a suburb of Perth, Western Australia
  - Duncraig Senior High School
