= Port an Eòrna =

Settlement in Scotland

Coordinates: 57°19′31″N 5°41′40″W

Port an Eòrna is the Scottish Gaelic name for the small settlement of Barleyport, situated almost midway between Plockton and the Kyle of Lochalsh, in Ross-shire, Scotland, in the Western Highlands. Port an Eòrna was once a fishing community near Duirinish, an area of common grazing for sheep and Highland cattle. Now it is a cluster of a few houses on National Trust for Scotland land. Port an Eòrna is a natural sandy beach. Eòrna means "barley" in Scottish Gaelic.

It has views across to the Cuillin on the Isle of Skye, as well as of Loch Carron, to the Applecross Peninsula. Port an Eòrna is approximately 1 mile (1.5 kilometres) from the railway station at Duirinish (on the Kyle to Inverness rail service).

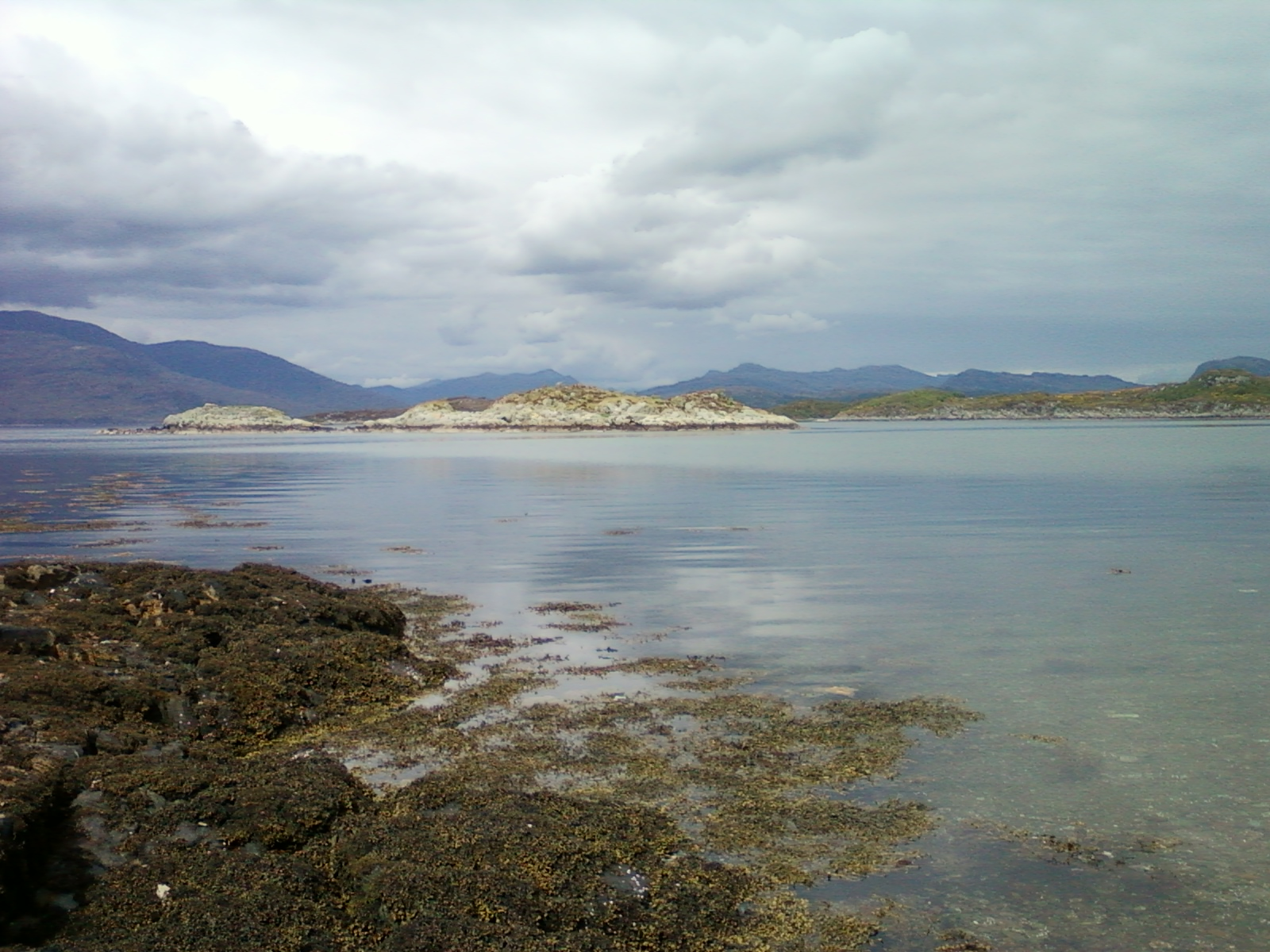
Looking across the mouth of Lochs Carron and Kishorn to the Applecross peninsula

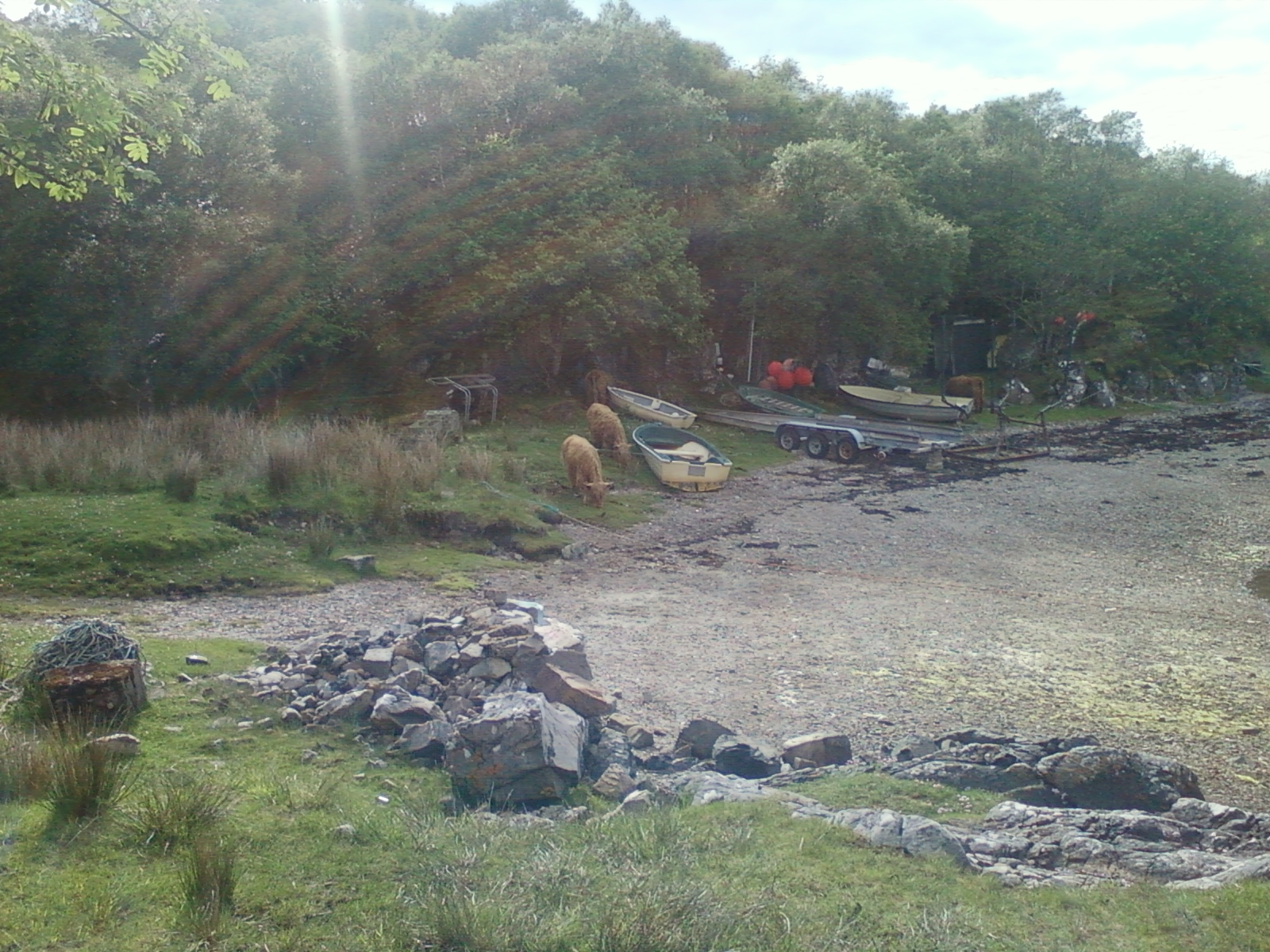
Highland cattle

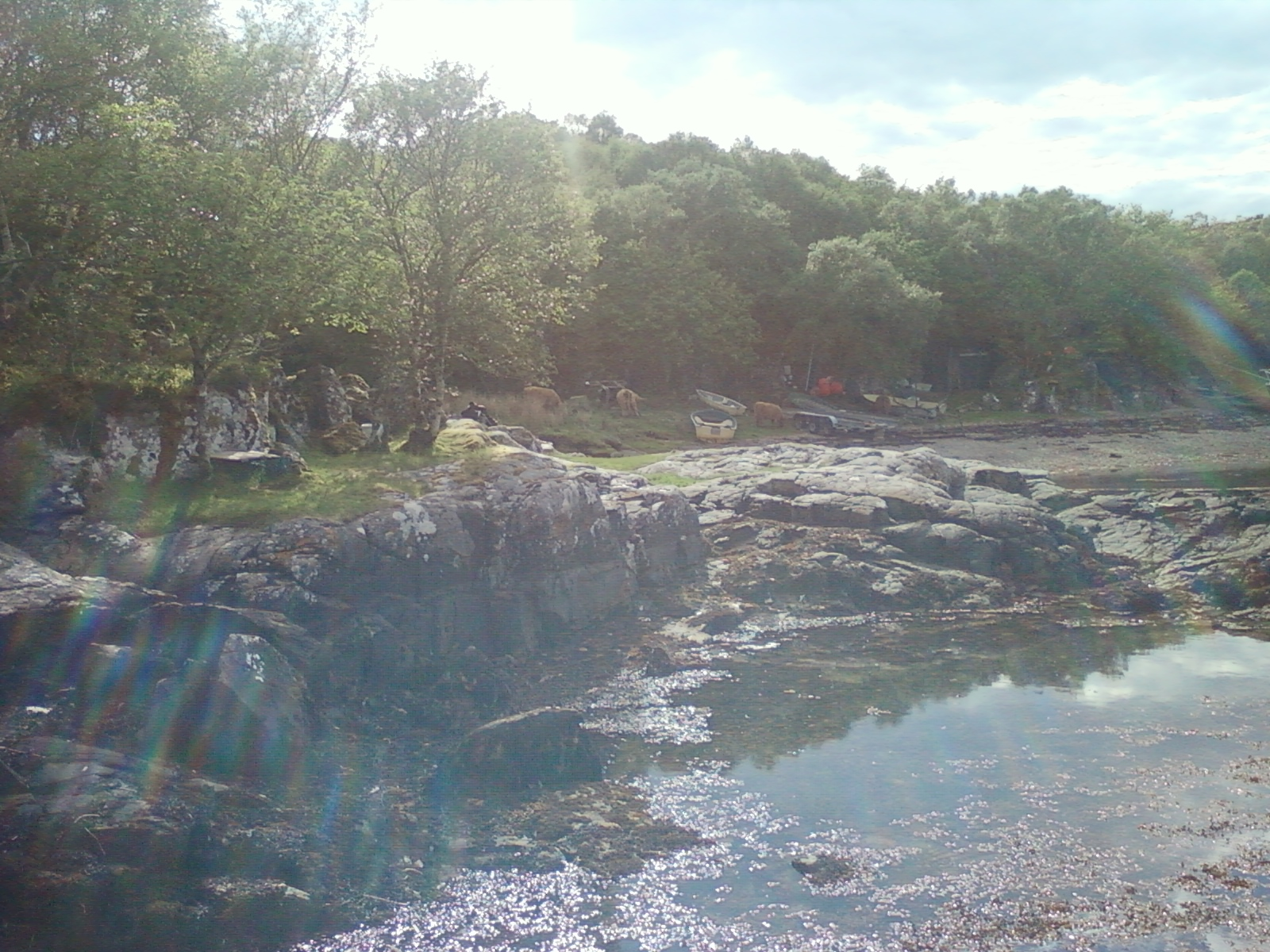
In the past, fishing boats pulled ashore here

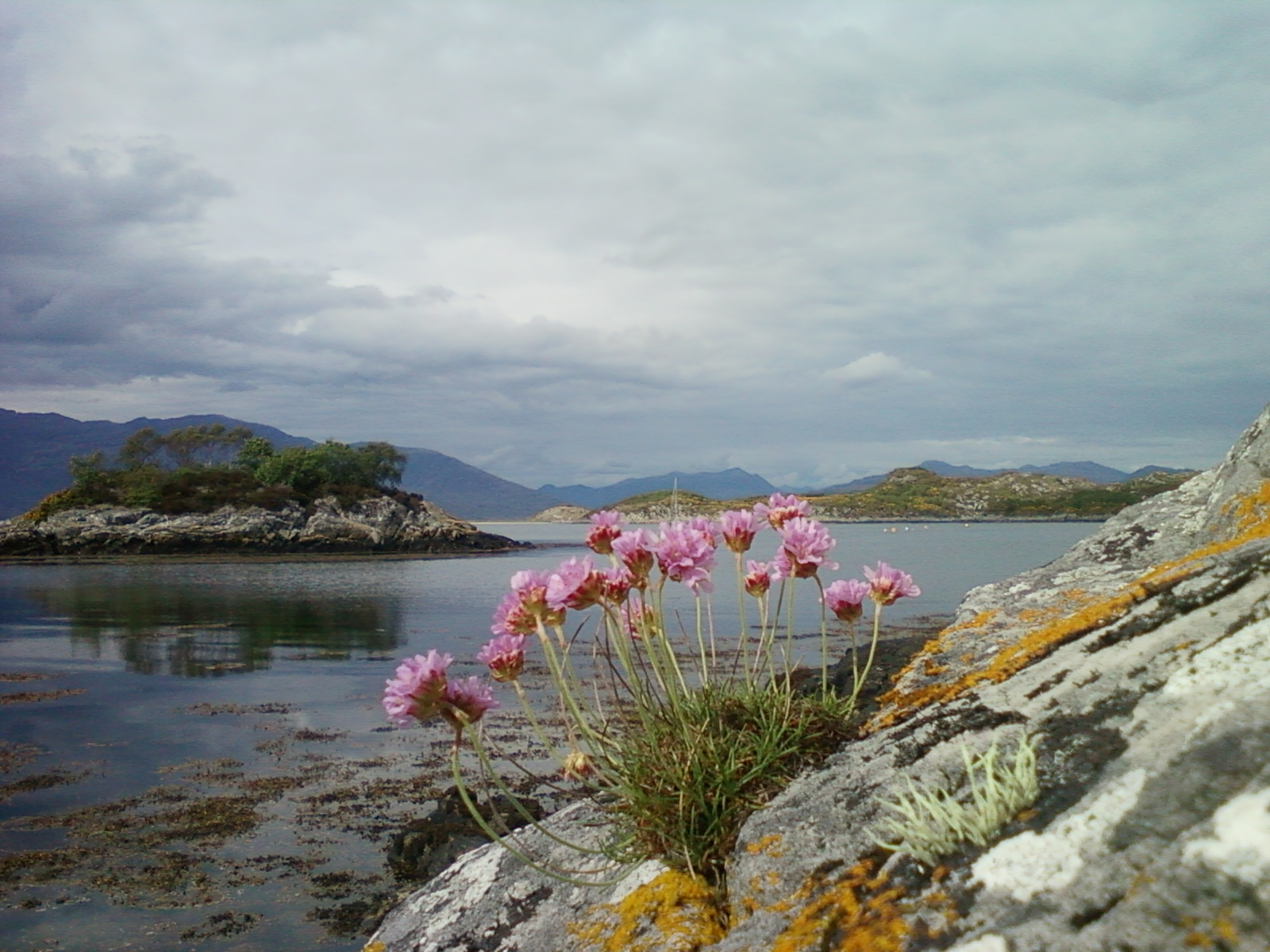
Flora on rocks

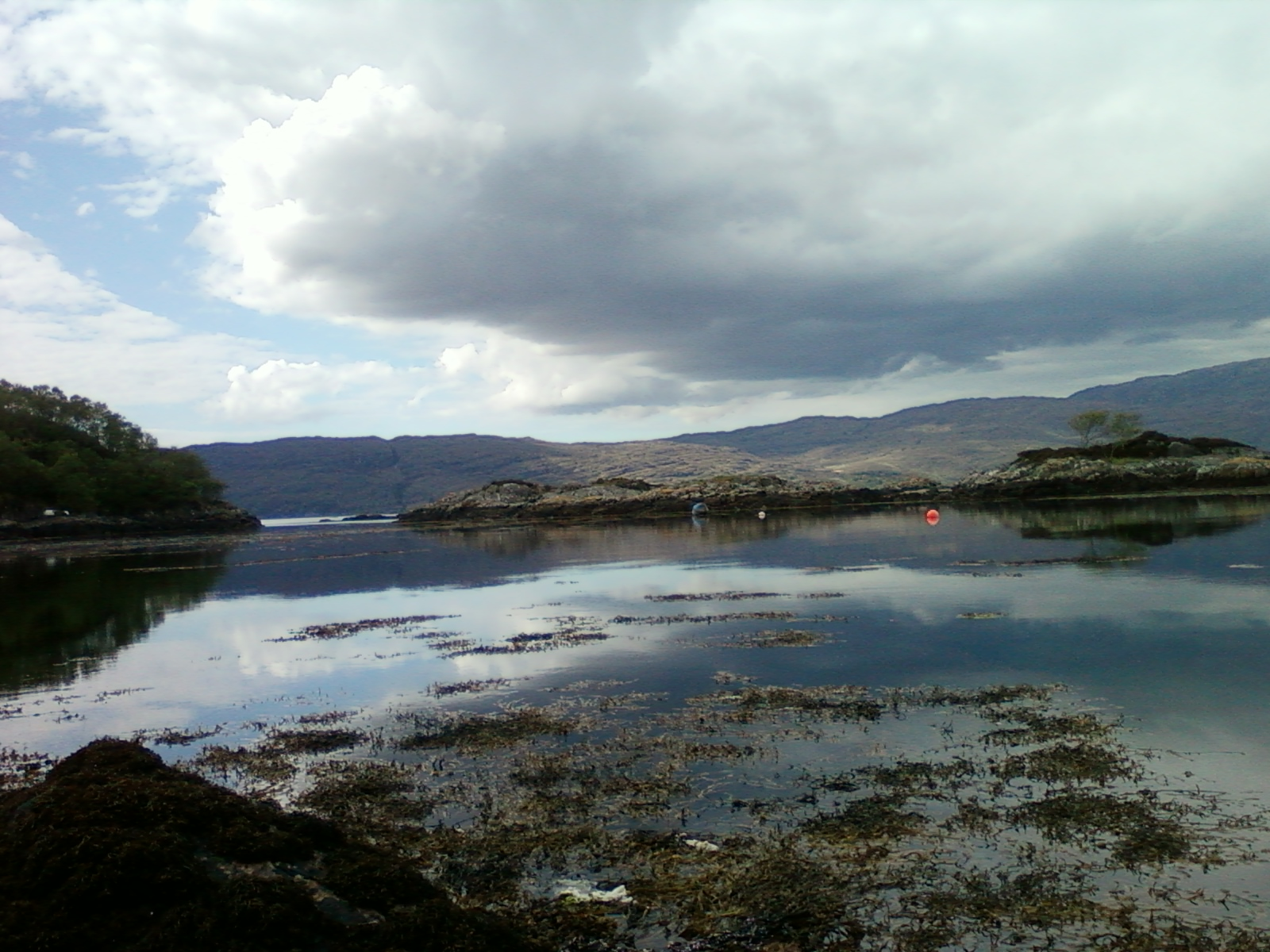
Buoys mark the position of creels below

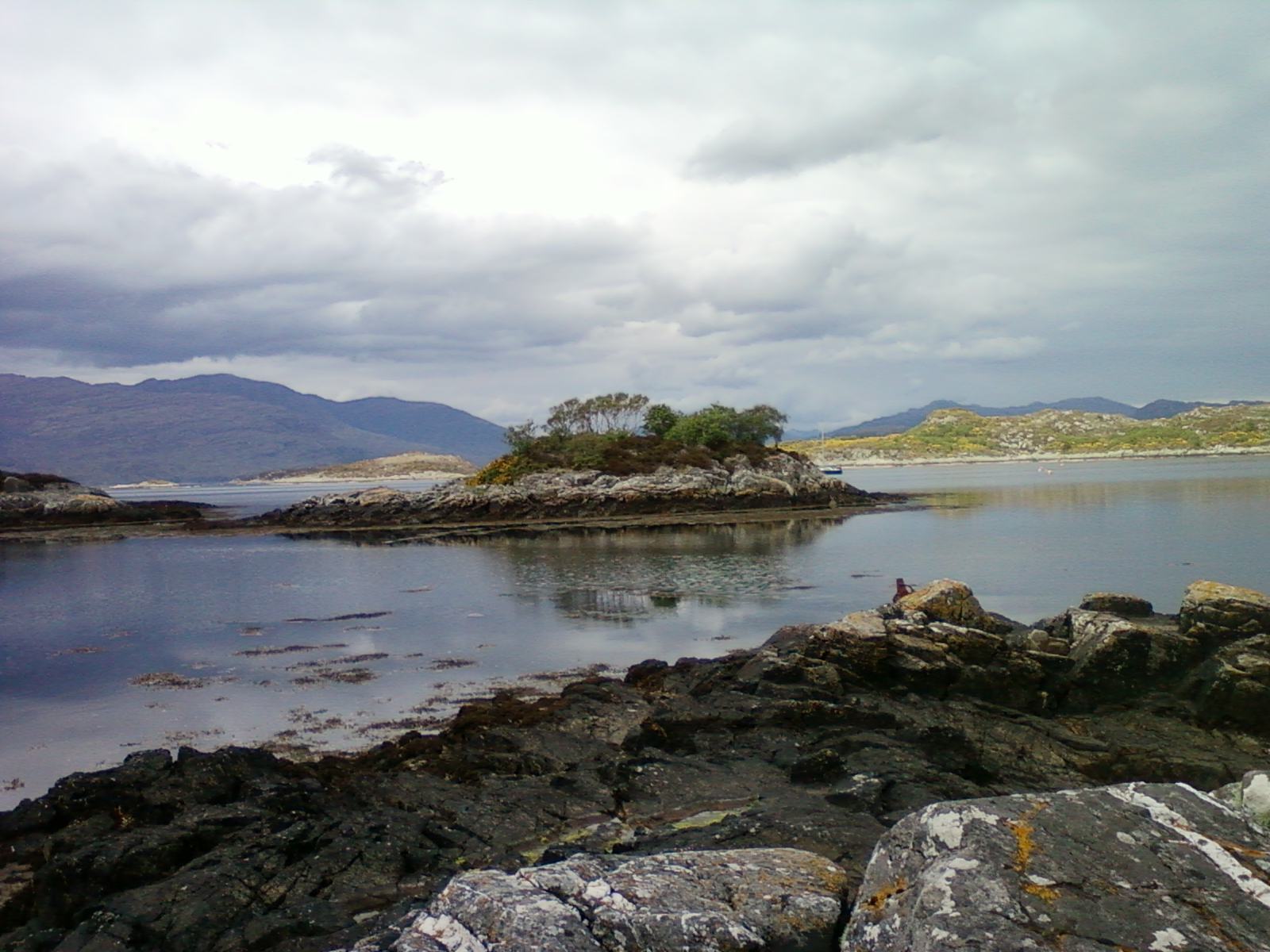
Island offshore

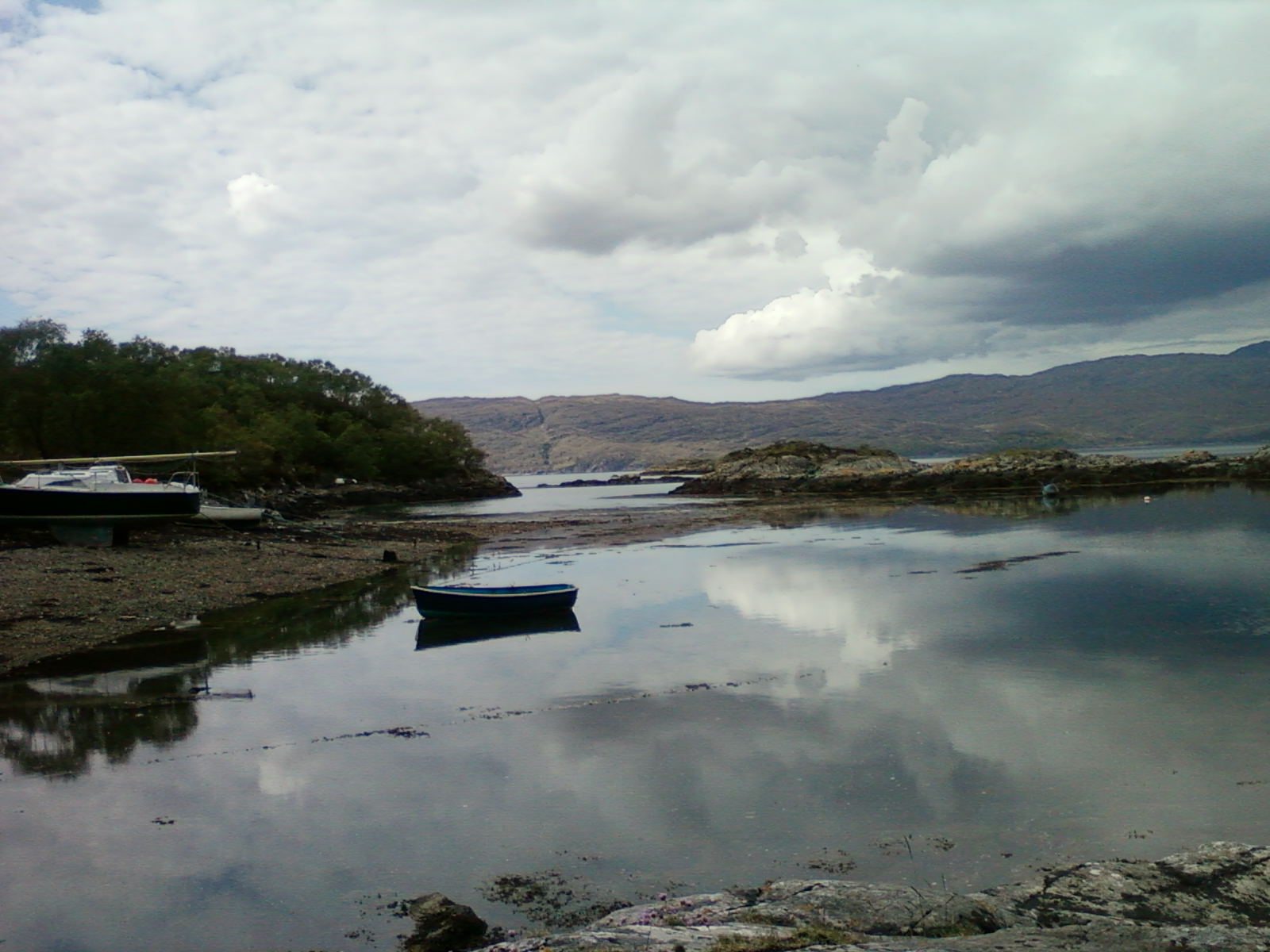
Boats operated from here in the past
