= James Fraser (university administrator) =

British academic

James Mackenzie Fraser CBE (born July 1948) is a former university administrator who was the first principal and vice-chancellor of the University of the Highlands and Islands, in the north of Scotland. He held senior management roles in Scottish educational institutions for over 23 years, working at three colleges that went on to achieve University status.

== Early life and education ==
Fraser was born in July 1948. He was brought up in Inverinate, near Kyle of Lochalsh, he was educated at Plockton High School in Ross-shire under the reign of Sorley MacLean, the Scottish Gaelic poet. Fraser studied at the University of Edinburgh and graduated in 1971 with a MA honours summa cum laude in mental philosophy, having also been a class medallist in moral philosophy and metaphysics. During his working life, he completed a master's degree in education and a further education teaching qualification.

== Early career ==
Fraser began his career as a lecturer in English and liberal studies at the former Inverness Technical College, now Inverness College UHI. During this time, he was an active member of the Educational Institute of Scotland (EIS) and was elected to the newly formed Highland Regional Council Education Committee as one of three teacher members representing Further Education staff.

He took up an administrative post in the Academic Registry of the University of Stirling in 1977 and gained promotion to assistant registrar three years later. From 1972 to 1979 Fraser also worked part-time with The Open University as a tutor on some on its arts foundation and other courses in the faculty of arts.

In 1987 Fraser was appointed secretary of Queen Margaret College in Edinburgh. In 1989 Fraser took up the position of secretary of Paisley College of Technology. The college was granted university status as the University of Paisley. Fraser remained there until 2002 and during his time there the organisation went through much change: expanding its student numbers, undertaking a building programme and merging with the former Craigie College of Education in Ayr.

== University of Highlands and Islands ==
In September 2002 he was appointed as secretary of the UHI Millennium Institute. In January 2007 his post was redesignated as deputy principal-secretary of UHI. Fraser became UHI principal in October 2009, following the retirement of Professor Robert (Bob) Cormack. In February 2011 the UHI was awarded university title and became the University of the Highlands and Islands. Fraser became the university’s first principal and vice-chancellor, with academic robes being presented to him at a special ceremony being held to celebrate the event in August 2011.

While in this position Fraser spoke about the need to consider alternatives to traditional models of educating students. Speaking to Times Higher Education he said: “Our networked delivery and technology must bring a social enrichment to learning that overcomes the constraints imposed on our students by geography.” He gave the University's Christmas lecture in December 2013. before he retiring as principal.

He was a member of the Commission on the Delivery of Rural Education, set up by Scottish Government and COSLA which published a report in April 2013.

== Honours ==
He was appointed Commander of the Order of the British Empire (CBE) in the 2014 Birthday Honours for services to higher education in Scotland and to the Free Church of Scotland.
