= Loch Carron =

Sea loch on Scotland's west coast

Loch Carron MPA
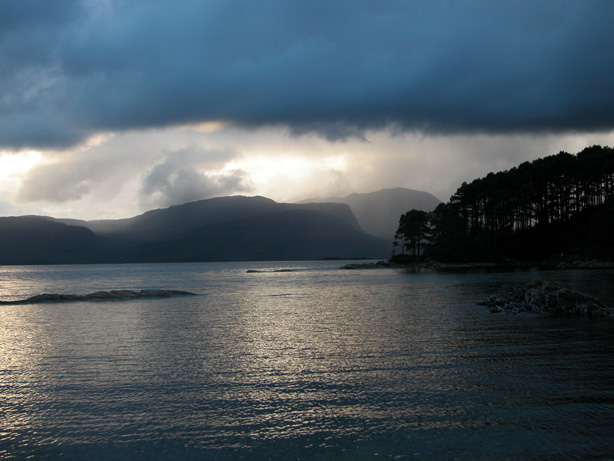
- Looking across Loch Carron to the Applecross peninsula.

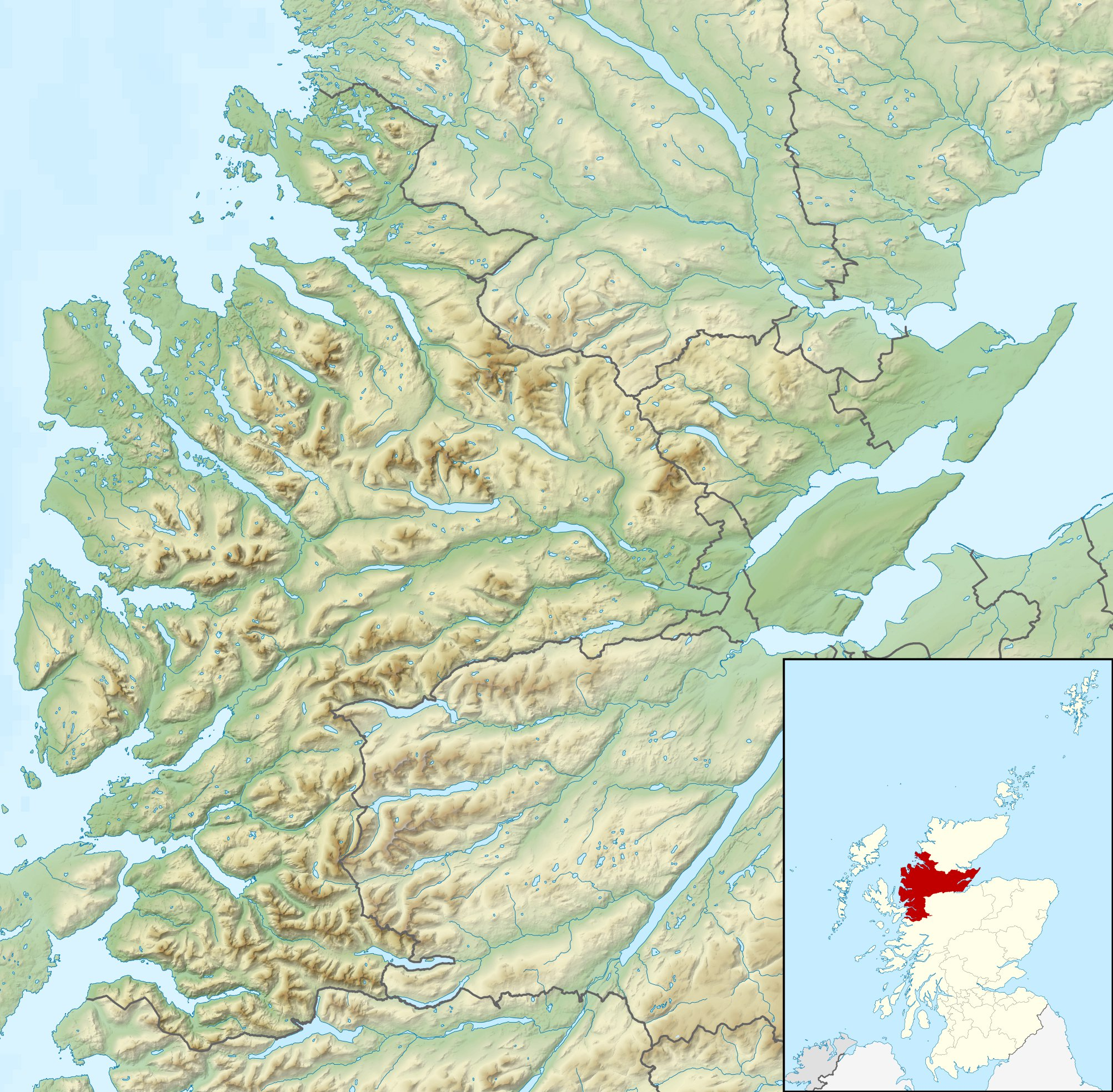
- Location within Ross and Cromarty
- Location: Ross and Cromarty, Scotland
- Coordinates: 57°22′N 5°31′W
- Area: 2,284.47 ha (8.8204 sq mi)
- Designation: Scottish Government
- Established: 2019
- Operator: Marine Scotland

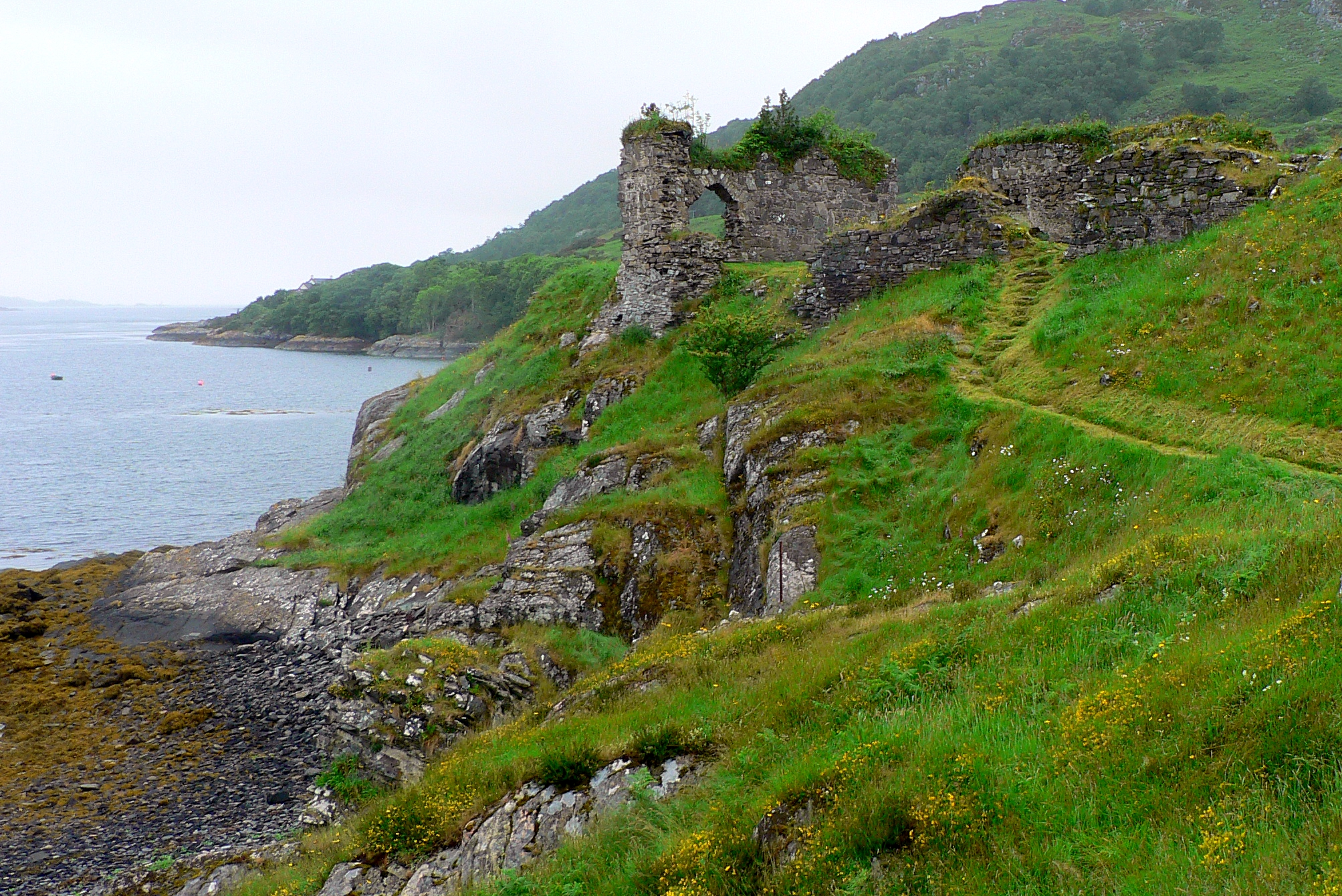
Strome Castle on the shore of Loch Carron.

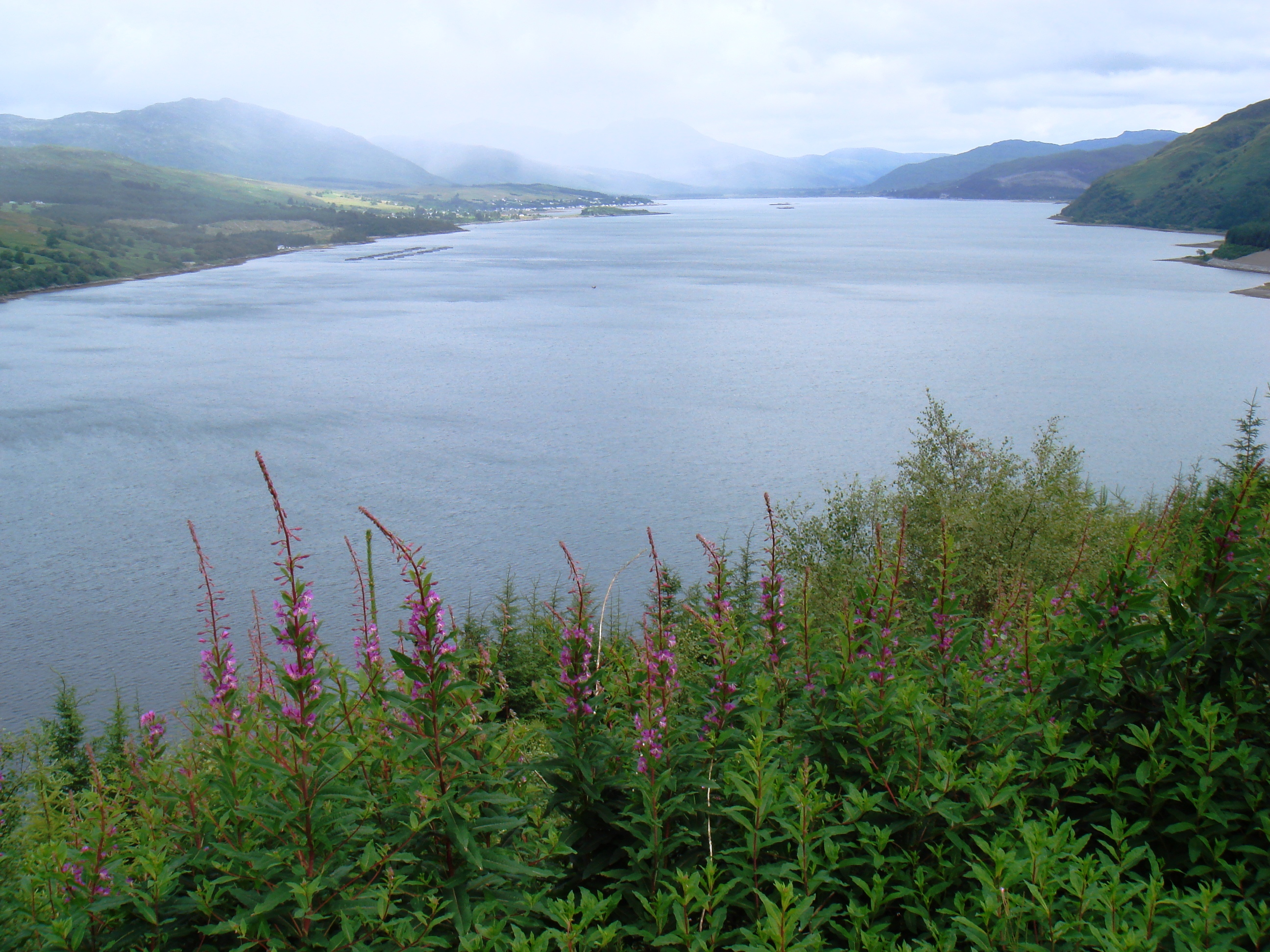
Loch Carron (Scottish Highlands)

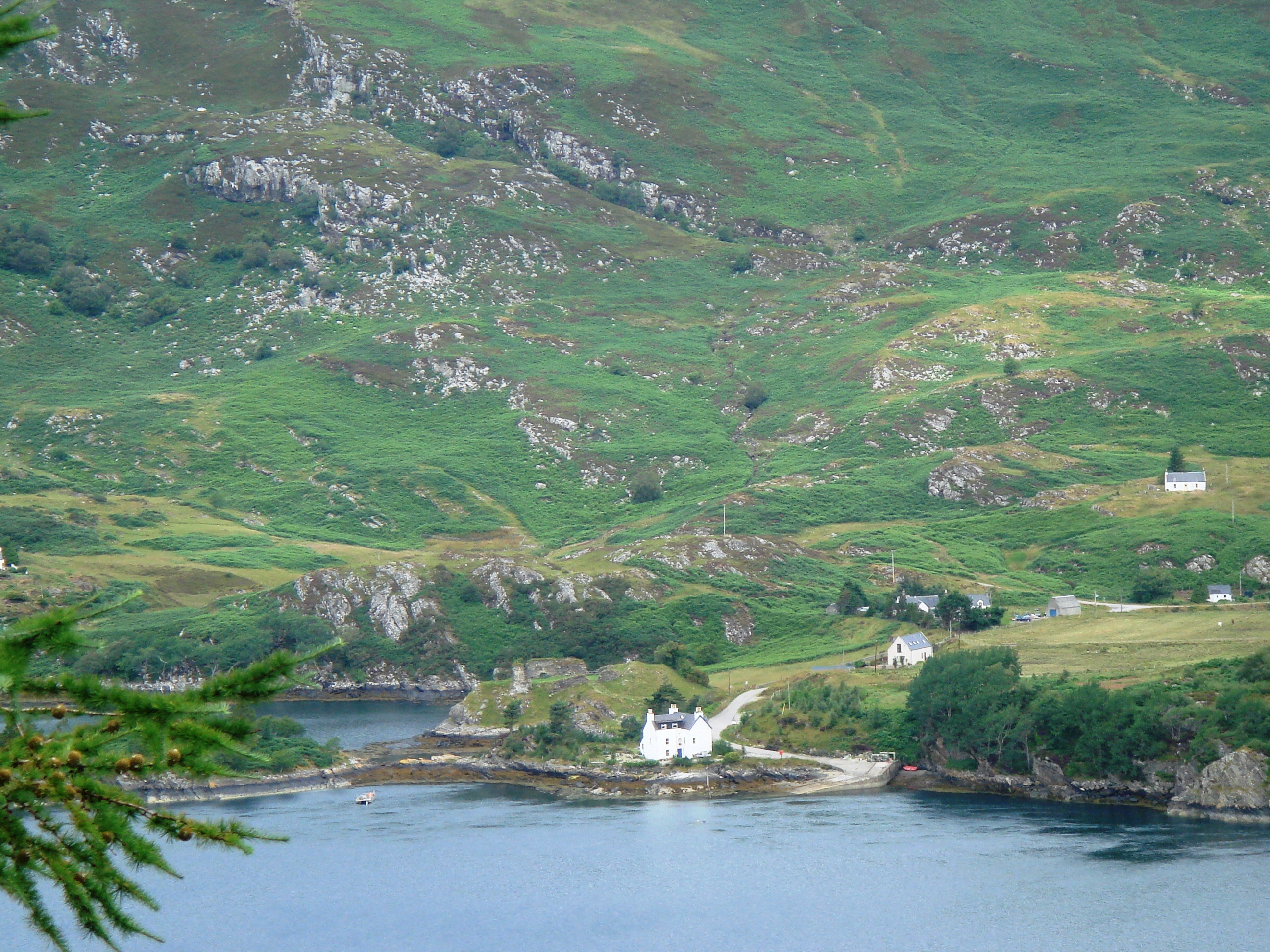
Loch Carron (Scottish Highlands)

Loch Carron (Scottish Gaelic: "Loch Carrann") is a sea loch on the west coast of Ross and Cromarty in the Scottish Highlands, which separates the Lochalsh peninsula from the Applecross peninsula, and from the Stromeferry headland east of Loch Kishorn. It is the point at which the River Carron enters the North Atlantic Ocean.

According to the marine charts, the tidal currents reach 3 knots (5.6 km/h; 3.5 mph) in the narrows, although not much water disturbance is visible in the flow. At the narrows, the depth of water is less than 20 metres, but in the basins on either side, it extends to a depth of more than 100 metres. Beneath the cliffs at Strome Castle is a colony of flame shells; with a population of over 250 million the loch is the world's largest flame shell bed, and was designated as a Nature Conservation Marine Protected Area (NCMPA) in 2017, with the protection being made permanent in 2018. The new MPA of 23 km^{2} took effect on 19 May 2019. Within the MPA the use of fishing gear that may damage the seabed is prohibited, although rod and line fishing and creeling are permitted.

== Tourism ==
Tourism is a significant industry in the Highlands of Scotland and one that generates important local economic activity. It provides employment for local people and attracts many visitors to Wester Ross in general and Lochcarron in particular because of its traditional seaside location.

The Kyle of Lochalsh Line runs along the south side of the loch, with railway stations at Attadale, Stromeferry, Duncraig, and Plockton.

== Archaeology ==
Between 1999 and 2004. a large scale archaeological project was undertaken, to locate and examine sites relating to the Mesolithic period, in the Inner Sound. In 2002, an offshoot project, the Sea Loch Survey was run by the same archaeologists to survey the sea lochs of Carron and Torridon. Between both projects they found 129 new archaeological sites in the strait. At Loch Carron, nine new sites were found, five caves/rock shelters and four stone tool scatters.

== See also ==
- River Carron
- Lochcarron, a village on the loch
- Stromeferry, situated on the south side at the narrows
- Plockton, village with harbour at the west end from which boat service takes tourists to the seal colony on the islands

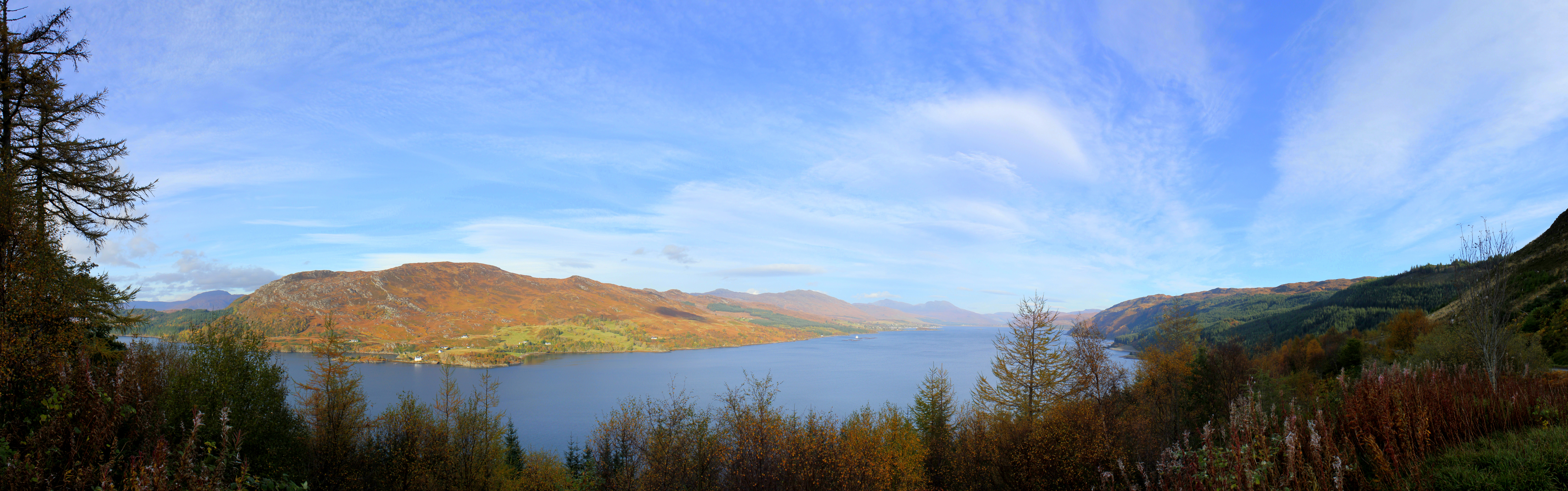
Loch Carron from the viewing point above Stromeferry

== Bibliography ==
- 2528 Loch Gairloch, Loch Kishorn and Loch Carron (Map) (2007 ed.). UK Hydrographic Office.
