= Daniel Hamilton (businessman) =

British businessman (1860 – 1939)

Daniel Mackinnon Hamilton
- Born: 6 December 1860; Arran, Scotland
- Died: 6 December 1939 (aged 79); Scotland
- Occupations: Businessman, landlord
- Spouse: Lady Margarete Elizabeth Hamilton

Sir Daniel Mackinnon Hamilton (6 December 1860 – 6 December 1939) was a Scottish businessman who made Bengal his second home. He established a zamindari in Gosaba, where he experimented with programmes of rural and social upliftment. He was a visionary and builder of rural reconstruction programmes at a time when the Indian national movement was gaining momentum, and gave importance to rural upliftment and self-help.

== Early life ==
Hamilton was brought up in a business family on the Isle of Arran, off the West coast of Scotland. He was sent out to Bombay in 1880 to look after the branch of the mercantile firm Mackinnon-Mackenzie.

He was married to Margaret Elizabeth Hamilton (later Lady).

== Career ==
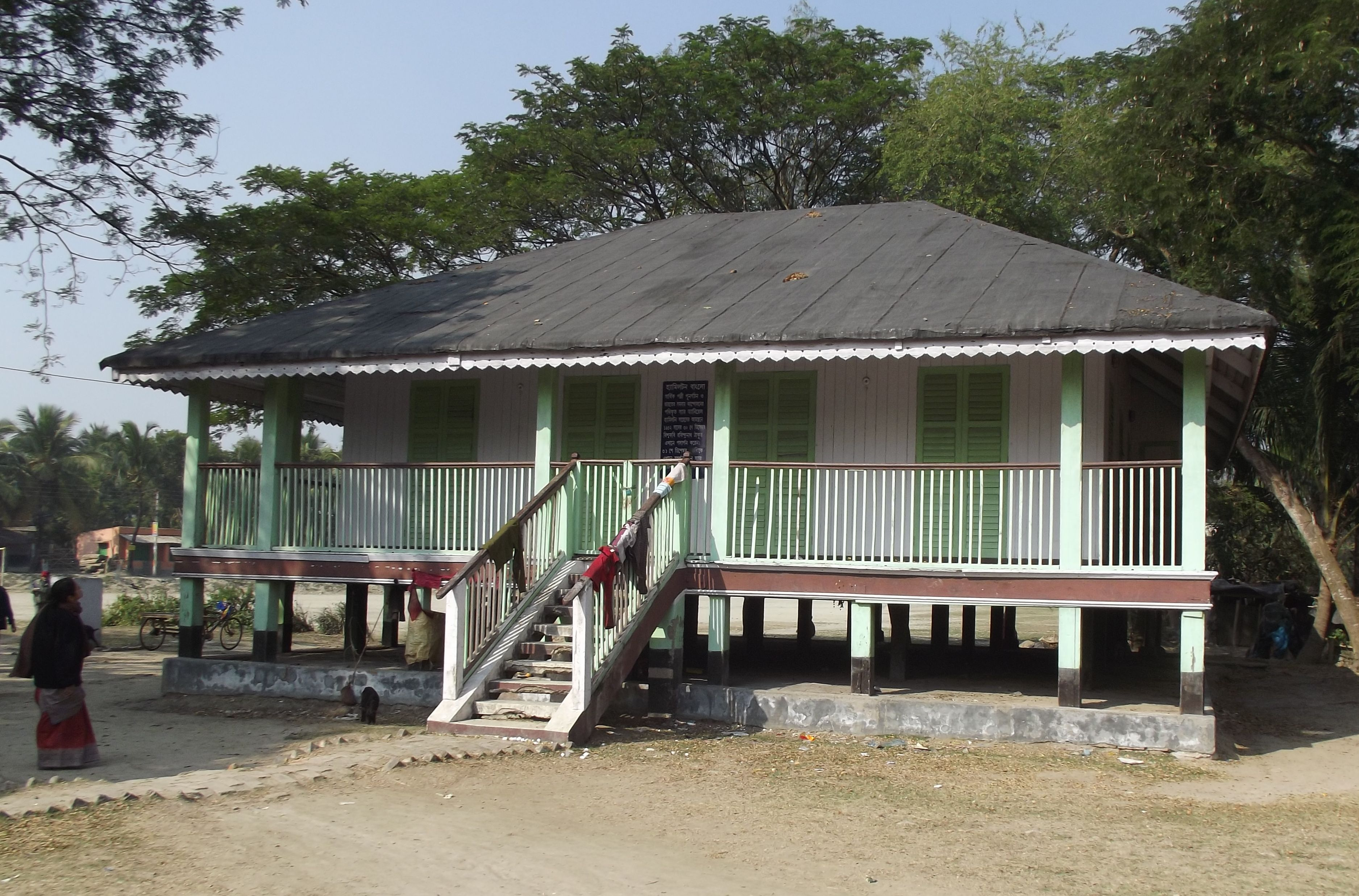
Bungalow of Sir Daniel Hamilton at Gosaba

He became the chief of Mackinnon Mackenzie in Calcutta in the early twentieth century. In 1903 he bought land of "... about 9000 acres in Gosaba and had it reclaimed by felling the woods and raising embankment on the riverside". His involvement with Gosaba was motivated by his desire to improve the living conditions of the poverty stricken people of British India. He introduced the cooperative system in Gosaba, and in all of Sunderbans, and thus educated the people to share responsibility. His championing of the cooperative society in the Sunderbans ran parallel with the growth of the cooperative movement in India. He also established the cooperative credit society with 15 members in Gosaba. He provided an initial capital of Rs. 500 for the society, forming "...a nucleus of a group of rural credit societies...". In 1918 he started a Consumers' Cooperative Society. In 1919 he set up a central model farm to experiment with paddy, vegetables and fruits. A Cooperative Paddy Sales Society was established in 1923. In 1924 he established the Gosaba Central Cooperative Bank, and in 1927 he established the Jamini Rice Mill. In 1934 he started the Rural Reconstruction Institute, and two years later he began the issue of one rupee notes in Gosaba.

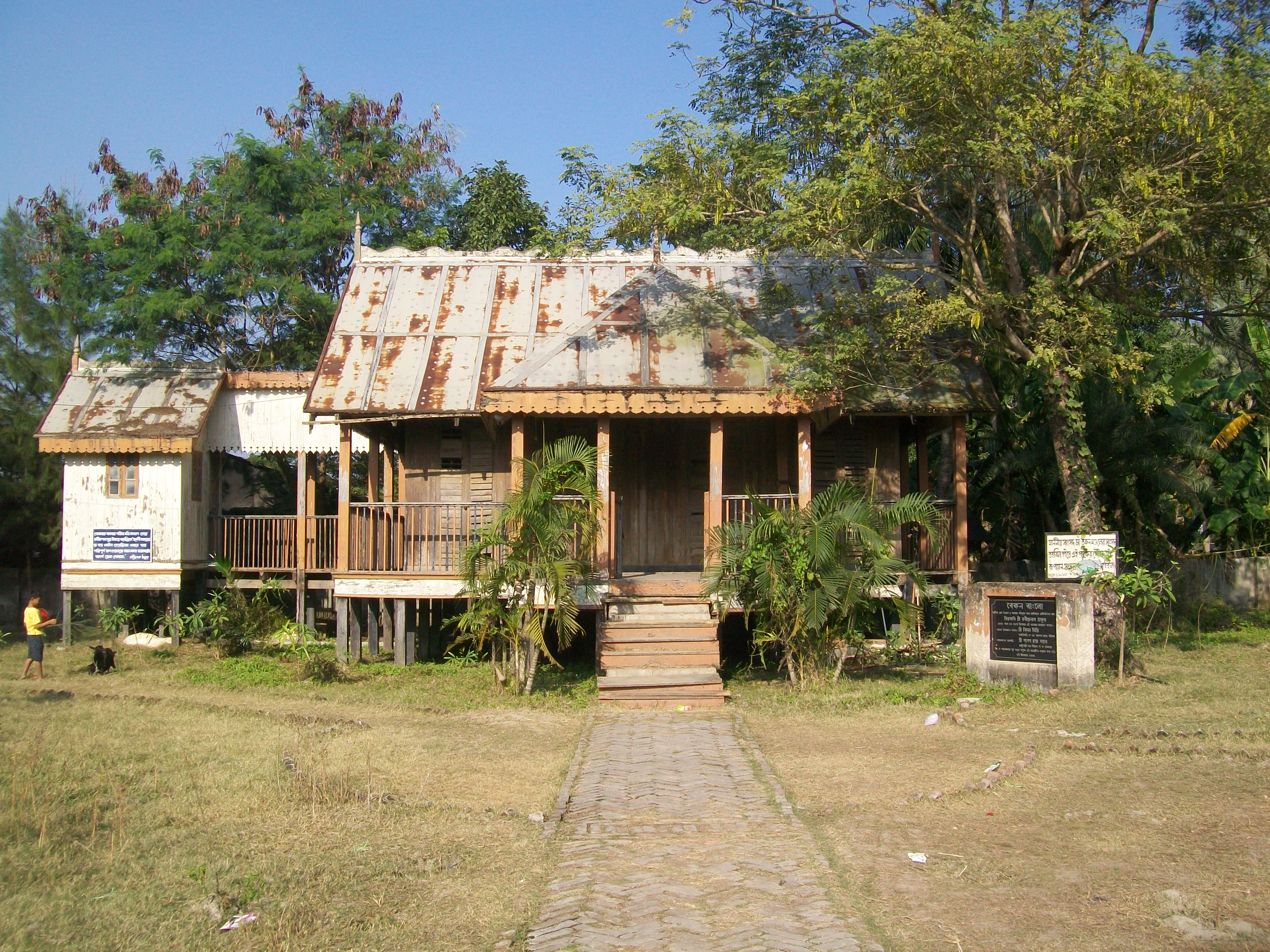
A view of Daniel Hamilton's Bungalow

He was a contemporary and close associate of the Nobel Laureate poet, Rabindranath Tagore, with whom he exchanged several letters on the need for village reconstruction and cooperative societies.

As his Gosaba project neared completion in the 1930s, Hamilton invited both Tagore and Mahatma Gandhi to visit it. Tagore did so in December 1932.

Gandhi never did visit, but in 1935, just as he was getting deeply involved in his own quite different experiment in village revitalization, he sent his secretary, Mahadev Desai, in his place. Desai spent about a week with Hamilton at Gosaba in early February and wrote about the visit in a four-part series in Harijan, the Gandhian weekly. Desai was impressed with both Hamilton (“a remarkable man” of “lofty idealism”) and the Gosaba project. Desai was there on 7 February 1935, when the final clod of earth was placed to complete 130 miles of dikes. Over the previous 30 years Gosaba had gone from easily flooded jungle to a prosperous estate of 10,000 people in twenty-five villages, linked by a network of cooperative societies, dispensaries and schools. All disputes were settled locally and there was no alcohol in evidence. It showed what a benevolent and reform-minded landlord could achieve. But Gosaba only pointed “toward” an ideal estate, and Desai ends his series with several suggested improvements including lower rates of rent.

== Death ==
Hamilton died on his 79th birthday.
