= Duncraig railway station =

Railway station in Highland, Scotland

Duncraig Scottish Gaelic: Dùn na Creige
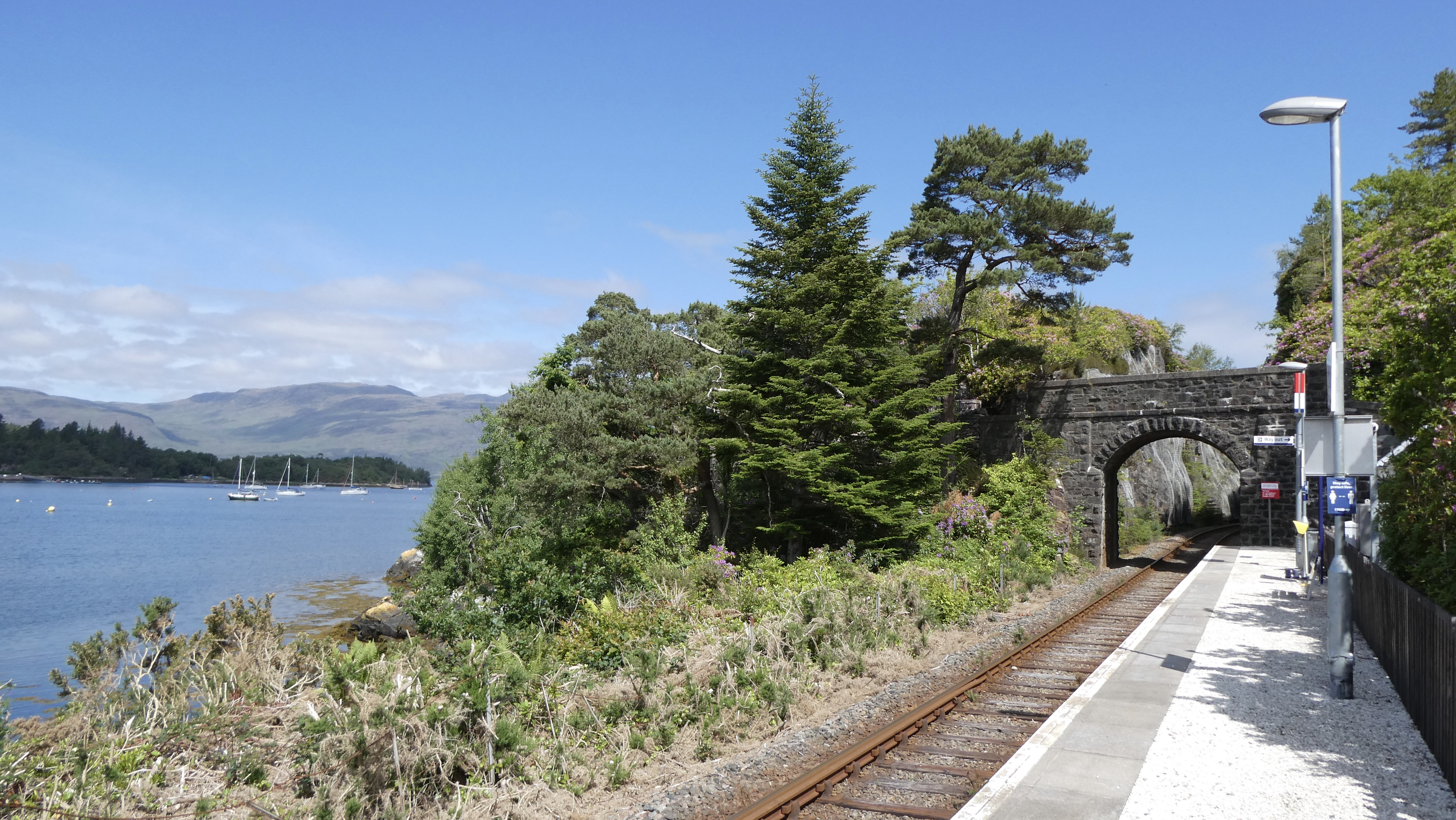
- The platform alongside Loch Carron, looking northeast

General information
- Location: Duncraig Castle, near Plockton, Highland; Scotland
- Coordinates: 57.3369°N 5.6372°W
- Grid reference: NG812332
- Manager: ScotRail
- Platforms: 1

Other information
- Station code: DCG

History
- Original company: Highland Railway
- Pre-grouping: Highland Railway
- Post-grouping: LMSR

Key dates
- 1897: Opened as private station Duncraig Platform
- 23 May 1949: Opened to the public
- 10 September 1962: Renamed
- 7 December 1964: Closed
- 5 January 1976: Reopened

Passengers
- 2021/22: ▲376
- 2022/23: ▲462
- 2023/24: ▼448
- 2024/25: ▼354
- 2025/26: ▲422

Listed Building – Grade II
- Feature: Duncraig Railway Station
- Designated: 7 April 1997
- Reference no.: LB44180
Location
Notes
- Passenger statistics from the Office of Rail and Road

Duncraig railway station is a remote railway station by the shore of Loch Carron on the Kyle of Lochalsh Line, originally (privately) serving Duncraig Castle, a mansion near Plockton, in the Highland council area of northern Scotland. The station is 57 miles 9 chains (91.9 km) from Dingwall, between Stromeferry and Plockton. ScotRail, who manage the station, operate all services at the station. It is often regarded as one of the most idyllic railway stations in Great Britain.

== History ==
The station was built as a private station for Duncraig Castle by the Kyle of Lochalsh Extension (Highland Railway), opening on 2 November 1897.

It became a public station in 1949. As a result of the Beeching cuts, Duncraig was closed between 7 December 1964 and 5 January 1976; it was reopened after local train drivers refused to acknowledge the station's closure for the intervening 11 years. One of the drivers is quoted as saying:

"We thought that if the English wanted to close a railway station they should pick on Euston or King's Cross"

The station is a Category B listed building.

== Facilities ==
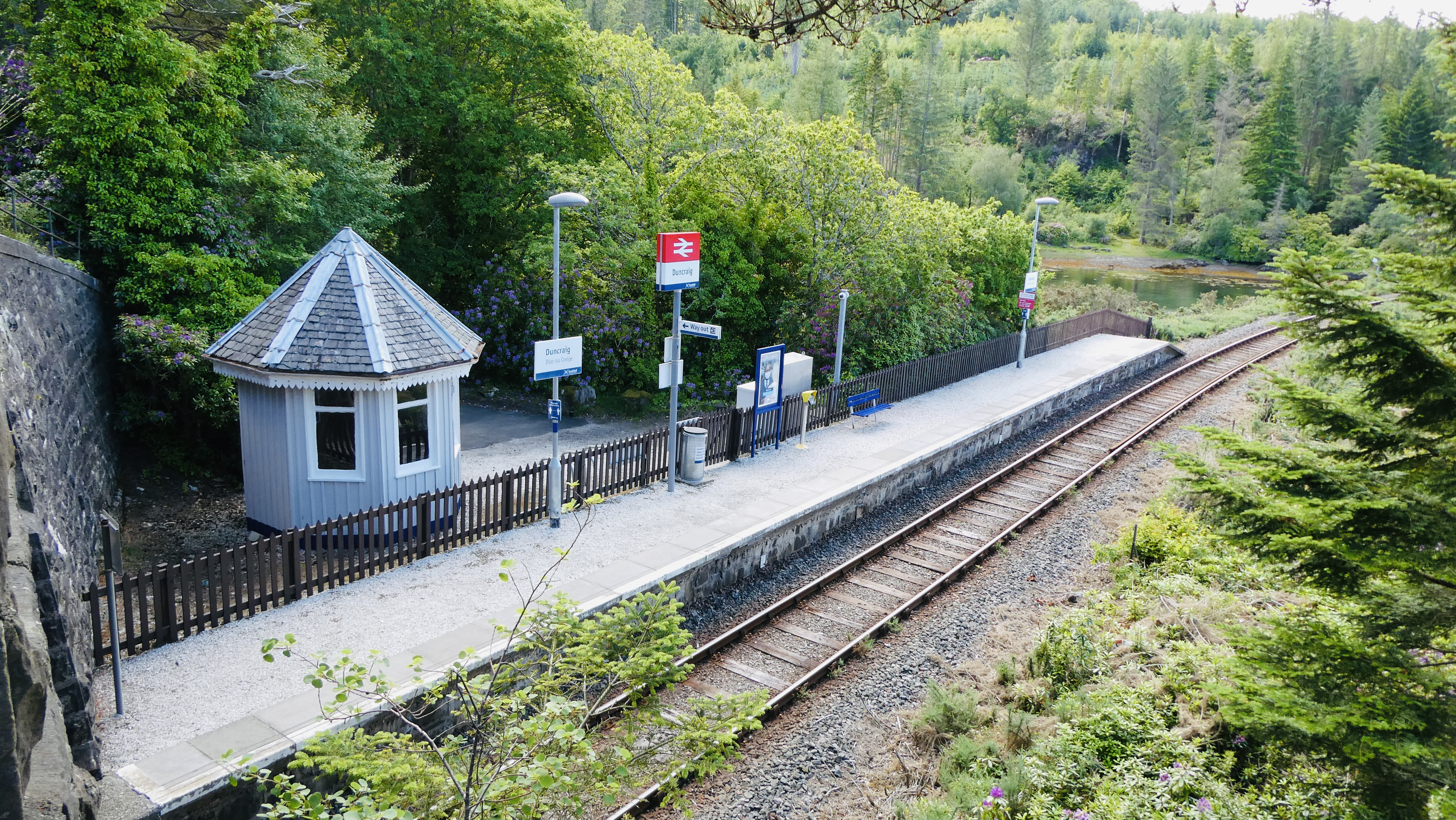
View down onto the platform, looking southwest. Note the unique octagonal waiting room just outside the platform.

The only facilities at the station are a unique octagonal waiting room, a bench and a help point. The station, however, has step-free access. As there are no facilities to purchase tickets, passengers must buy one in advance, or from the guard on the train.

== Passenger volume ==
Passenger Volume at Duncraig
| | 2004–05 | 2005–06 | 2006–07 | 2007–08 | 2008–09 | 2009–10 | 2010–11 | 2011–12 | 2012–13 | 2013–14 | 2014–15 | 2015–16 | 2016–17 | 2017–18 | 2018–19 | 2019–20 | 2020–21 | 2021–22 | 2022–23 | 2023–24 | 2024–25 |
|---|---|---|---|---|---|---|---|---|---|---|---|---|---|---|---|---|---|---|---|---|---|
| Entries and exits | 463 | 391 | 342 | 485 | 388 | 394 | 602 | 722 | 784 | 534 | 448 | 494 | 348 | 408 | 484 | 500 | 30 | 376 | 462 | 448 | 354 |

The statistics cover twelve month periods that start in April.

== Services ==
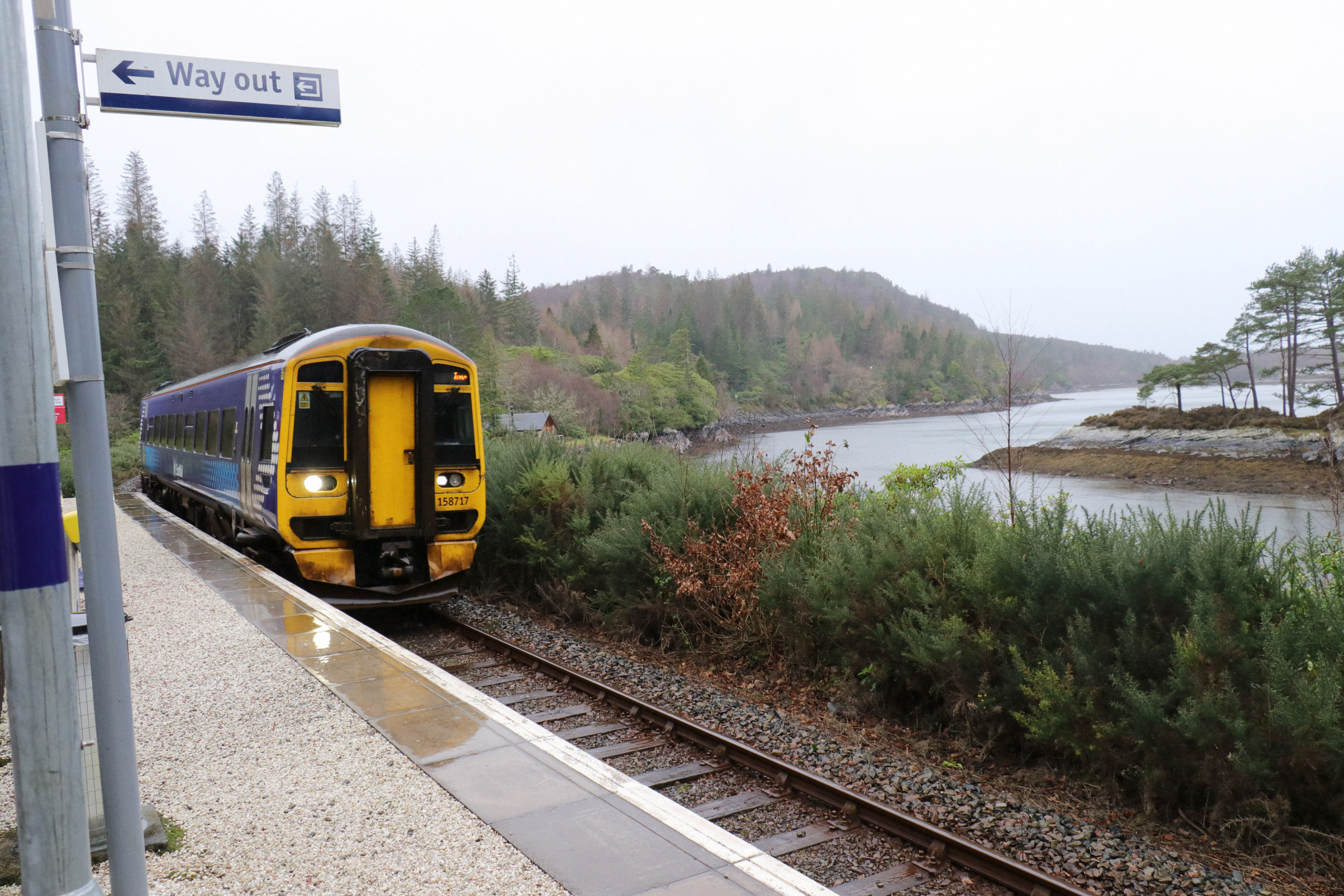
A Abellio ScotRail service approaching Duncraig bound for Inverness

Four trains each way call (on request) on weekdays and Saturdays. On Sundays, there is only one train each way, plus a second from May to late September only.

| Preceding station | National Rail | Following station |
|---|---|---|
| Stromeferry | ScotRail; Kyle of Lochalsh Line | Plockton |
| | Historical railways | |
| Stromeferry; Line and station open | Highland Railway; Dingwall and Skye Railway | Plockton; Line and station open |

== Bibliography ==
- Brailsford, Martyn, ed. (December 2017) [1987]. Railway Track Diagrams 1: Scotland & Isle of Man (6th ed.). Frome: Trackmaps. ISBN 978-0-9549866-9-8.
- Butt, R. V. J. (October 1995). The Directory of Railway Stations: details every public and private passenger station, halt, platform and stopping place, past and present (1st ed.). Sparkford: Patrick Stephens Ltd. ISBN 978-1-85260-508-7. OCLC 60251199. OL 11956311M.
- Caton, Peter (2018). Remote Stations. Leicestershire: Matador. ISBN 978-1-78901-408-2.
- Vallance, H.A.; Clinker, C.R.; Lambert, Anthony J. (1985). The Highland Railway : The History of the Railways of the Scottish Highlands - Vol 2 (4th ed.). David St John Thomas. ISBN 0946537232.
