= Plockton High School =

- Àrd-sgoil a' Phluic
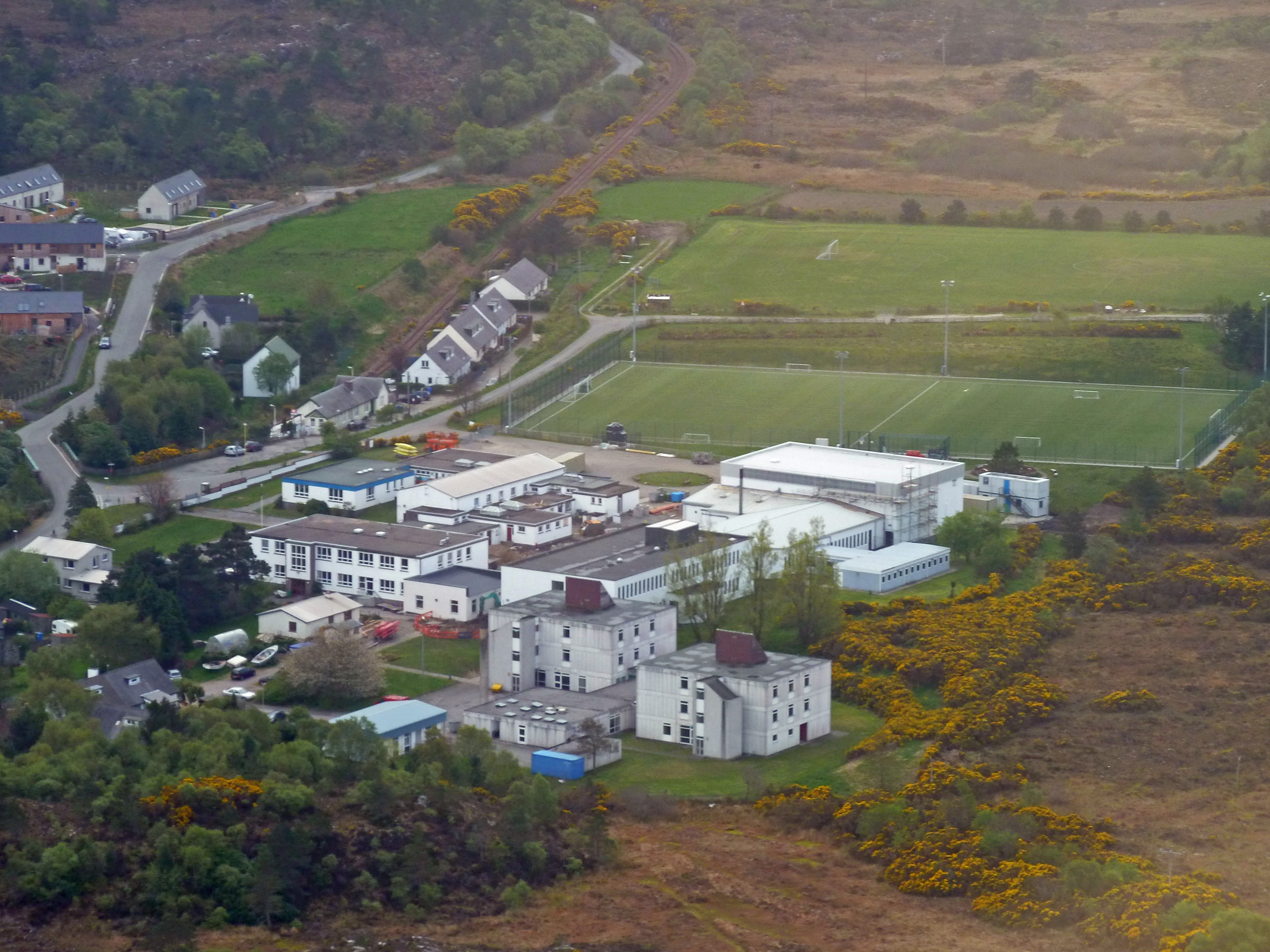
- The school building from the air, 2011

Location
- Plockton, Ross-shire, Scotland, IV52 8TU
- Coordinates: 57.335°N 5.665°W

Information
- Type: Secondary
- Motto: An T-Ionnsachadh Og, An T-Ionnsachadh Boidheach (Learn Young, Learn Well)
- Local authority: Highland Council
- Rector: Jo Scott-Moncrieff
- Gender: Boys and girls
- Age: 11 to 18
- Enrolment: 221
- Language: English, Gaelic
- Houses: Alba, Caledonia & Dalriada
- Website: plocktonhighschool.wixsite.com/amploc

Plockton High School is an 11–18 high school in the village of Plockton, Scotland. The catchment area for the school stretches from Applecross in the north to Corran in the south. Since the opening of the Skye Bridge, increasing numbers of pupils from South Skye, who would have traditionally gone to Portree High School, have instead attended Plockton High School. The school has a small hostel to cater for pupils who live far away.

The school is currently part of the Plockton 3-18 Education Campus, which also contains Plockton Primary School, Sgoil Araich, and the National Centre of Excellence in Traditional Music.

== History ==
The original school building dated from 1858. In 1964 the school moved to a purpose-built building. The building was extended in 1980. The Education Act of 1872 required every Scottish parish to provide a school which was funded and regulated for children up to the age of 13. Plockton Public School, as it was originally known, was administered by a School Board, elected from local ratepayers, answerable to the Scotch Education Department in London. The first school built in the village opened in the 1870s and was designed by architect Alexander Ross of Dingwall. The first Rector of the school was John Sorley, who served as Rector until 1920. By the end of the 1950s, it was deemed the school building in the village was no longer suitable to meet the requirements for secondary education.

From 1956 to 1972 the school's Rector was the Scottish Gaelic poet Sorley MacLean. MacLean introduced Scottish Gaelic as a subject to the school, and the sport of shinty. He supervised the relocation of the school to the present site in 1964.

In 2023, the local council said that children from Plockton Primary School would be educated on the secondary school site, because of declining numbers.

== Overview ==
As the school serves a largely rural Highland area, it has a wide catchment area which stretches from Applecross in the north to Glenelg in the south. The school campus grounds feature a Hostel which is also the location for the National Centre of Excellence in Traditional Music based at the school. Between 2024–2025, the school roll was 219 pupils. As a Highland school, Gaelic language and culture are strongly promoted in the school, with Gaelic-medium pupils having separate Gaelic classes provided. The school is committed to the promotion of both Highland and Scottish Gaelic culture, pledging to ensure that the culture is "embedded in a range of activities and aspects of school life".

The associated primary schools for Plockton High School are currently Plockton Primary, Loch Duich Primary, Auchtertyre Primary, Glenelg Primary, Kyle Primary, Lochcarron Primary, Applecross Primary and Kyleakin Primary School.

The school currently features three school houses – Alba, Caledonia, and Dalriada – all of which are ancient names for Scotland, with siblings from the same family being allocated to the same house.

== Sgoil Chiùil na Gàidhealtachd ==
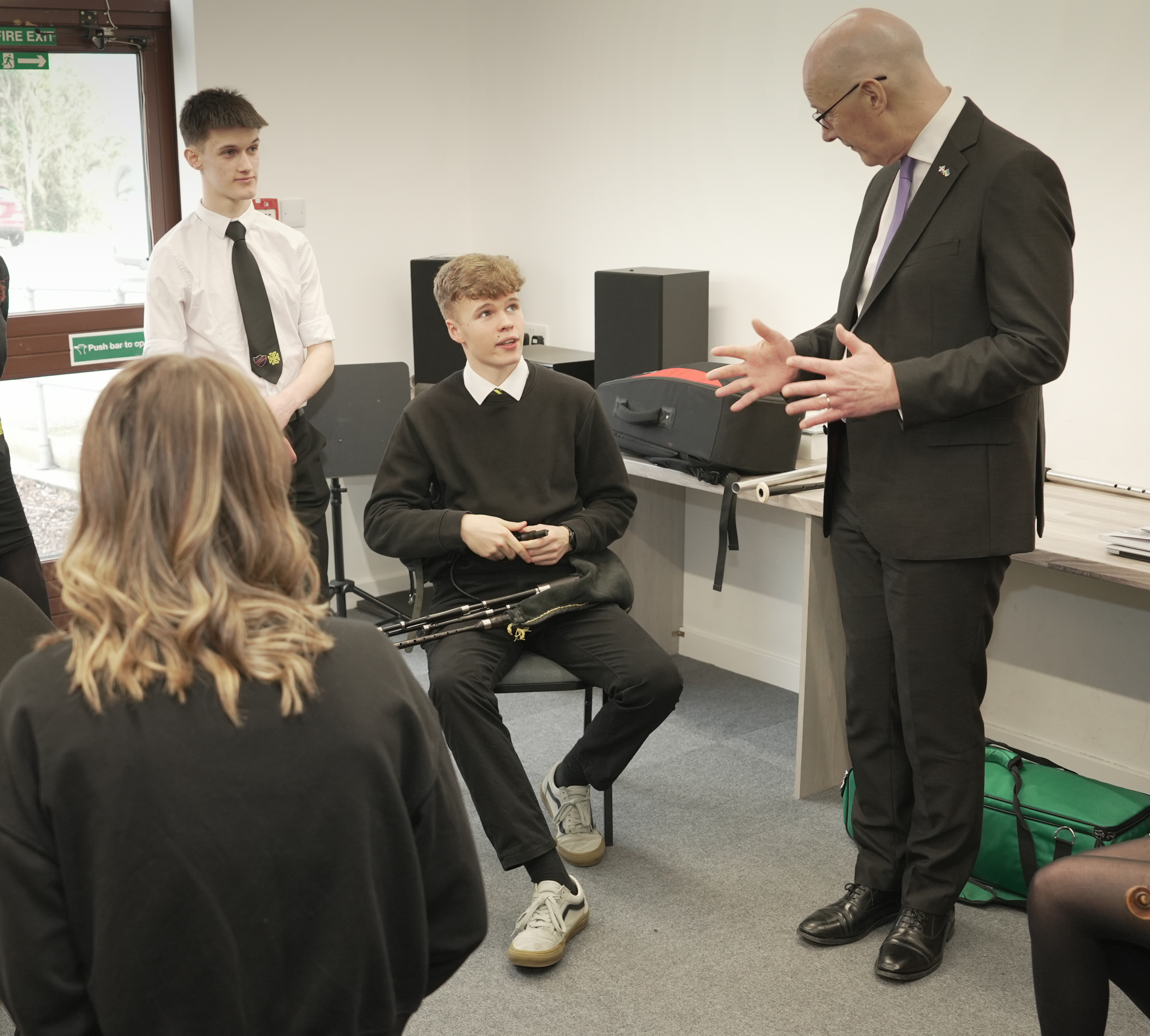
First Minister John Swinney with pupils at the National Centre of Excellence in Traditional Music

In 1999, the Scottish Government established an Excellence Fund for education, inviting each of Scotland's 32 local authorities to submit plans for projects which could be benefited from additional funding from the government. The Highland Council submitted a bid which consisted of plans to create a residential Centre of Excellence which would specialise in traditional music. The bid was ultimately successful, with the Scottish Government providing funding of £500,000 over three years, with additional funds being made available from The Highland Council.

Since its inauguration in 2000, Sgoil Chiùil na Gàidhealtachd (National Centre of Excellence in Traditional Music) has been located at the High School and is a music school. Any secondary school age pupil in Scotland can apply, and students from all over Scotland attend, most of whom stay in the school's hostel. The centre is unique amongst the other Excellence Centre's which were established under the Scottish Government's Excellence Funding scheme, in that the National Centre of Excellence in Traditional Musical focuses solely on one genre of music. It has since been regarded as a "testament to the huge growth in popularity and intrinsic importance and value of Scotland’s native musical culture".

Since 2008, the centre has been fully funded solely by The Highland Council.

== Performance and attainment ==
Since 2019, attainment in Fourth year (S4) at the school has typically been below the average of other similar schools across Scotland based on a virtual comparator method used by the Scottish Government to record school attainment data. The number of pupils in S4 attaining 5 or more awards at National 3 was 38% compared to 37% of a virtual comparator school. The school performed lower in 2020, with 70% attaining in the same category compared to 87% of a comparator school. By 2021, it had increased to 86%, the same as the comparator school in which it was compared. In 2022 and 2023, it fell below the percentage of the comparator school in which it was compared, with 79% and 81% of pupils respectively at Plockton High School attaining 5 or more awards at National 3. In contrast, the number of pupils at the school attaining 5 or more awards at National 5 was typically higher than that of comparator schools.

Attainment of pupils in Fifth year (S5) attaining 5 or more awards at National 4 were largely in line with the average of other comparator schools across Scotland, as was the percentage of pupils in Sixth year (S6) attaining 5 or more awards at National 4, National 5 and Higher.

== Notable former pupils ==
- James Fraser, first principal and vice-chancellor of the University of the Highlands and Islands
- Rhoda Grant, Member of the Scottish Parliament (MSP)
- John Farquhar Munro, MSP
