= Stromeferry railway station =

Railway station in Highland, Scotland

Stromeferry Scottish Gaelic: Port an t-Sròim
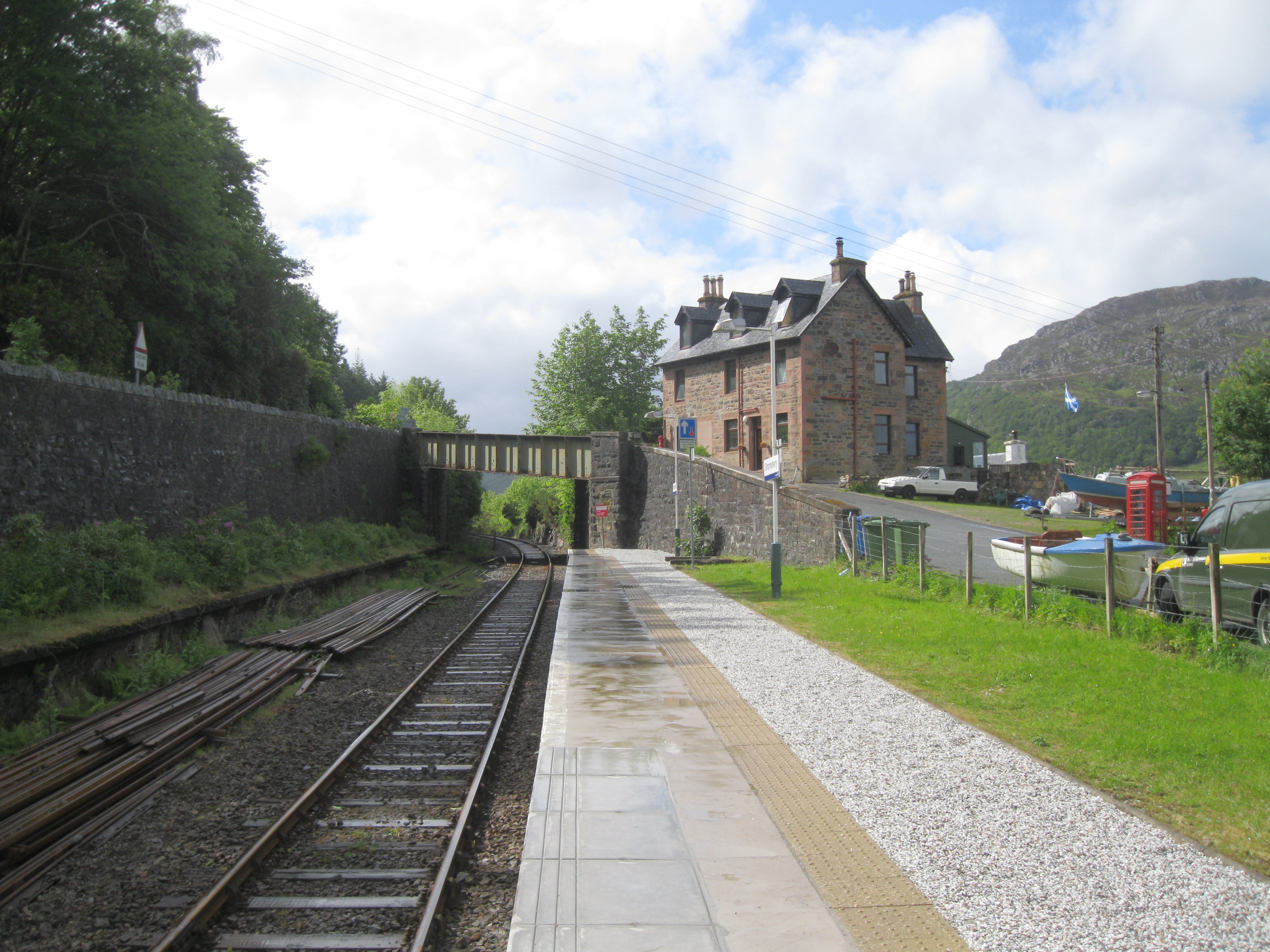
- The station seen in 2011. The second platform is still visible on the left.

General information
- Location: Stromeferry, Highland; Scotland
- Coordinates: 57.3523°N 5.5509°W
- Grid reference: NG865346
- Manager: ScotRail
- Platforms: 1

Other information
- Station code: STF

History
- Original company: Dingwall and Skye Railway
- Pre-grouping: Highland Railway
- Post-grouping: LMSR

Key dates
- 19 August 1870: Opened

Passengers
- 2021/22: ▲918
- 2022/23: ▲1,144
- 2023/24: ▼1,104
- 2024/25: ▲1,132
- 2025/26: ▼964
Location
Notes
- Passenger statistics from the Office of Rail and Road

Stromeferry railway station is a station on the Kyle of Lochalsh Line, serving the village of Stromeferry in the Highlands, northern Scotland. Stromeferry lies on the southern shore of Loch Carron, across from the ruined Strome Castle, near the west coast. The station is 53 miles 15 chains (85.6 km) from Dingwall, between Attadale and Duncraig. ScotRail, who manage the station, operate all services.

== History ==
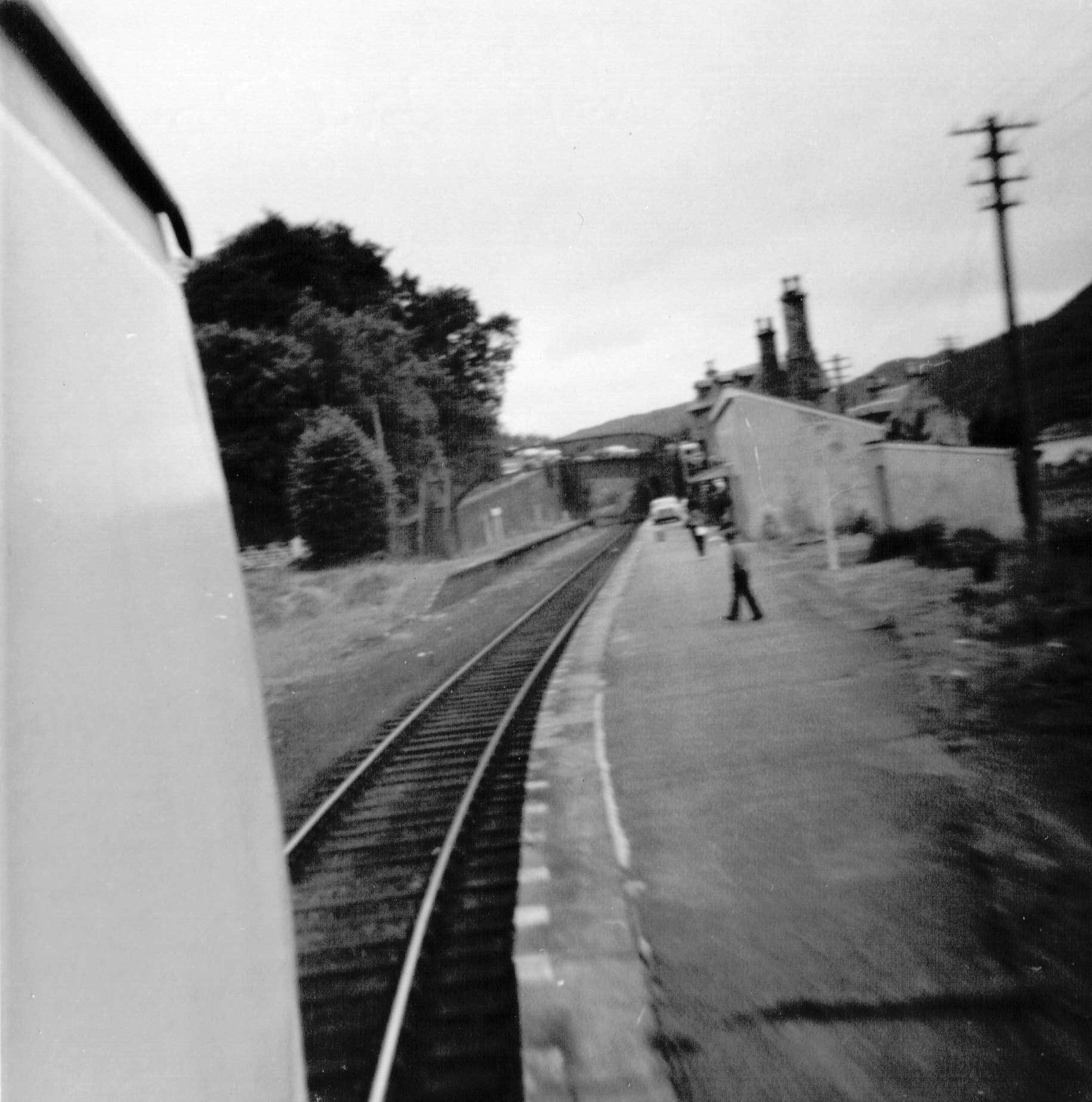
The station in 1970

The station opened for passenger traffic on 19 August 1870. For the first 27 years of its existence it was the terminus for the Dingwall & Skye Railway, bringing prosperity to the village when passengers and cargo could be moved to the ships.

The line was later extended beyond Stromeferry, to Kyle of Lochalsh, in 1897. This has been the original plan, but finances prevented Dingwall & Skye from completing the line until 1897. Only with government assistance, was the line completed. With the line no longer terminating at Stromeferry, the station lost much of its original significance.

The station was host to an LMS caravan from 1935 to 1939. A camping coach was positioned here by the Scottish Region from 1952 to 1967, although for the last two years a Pullman camping coach was used.

In the 1970s the station was revived when it became the railhead for materials arriving for the oil rig construction yard at Kishorn. To facilitate the increase of traffic, land was reclaimed in the mid-70's for four cement silos, five sidings (three looed alongside silos, two by Stromeferry Pier), as well as a new pier with cranes.

The railway depot closed in 1977, with the fabrication yard remaining open until 1987. The sidings were disconnected in 1982, and were lifted in 1988, leaving only a single-track line.

=== Accidents and incidents ===
On 3 June 1883 the station was occupied by 150 Sabbatarians, defeating the local police force and railway employees, to prevent the despatch of fish to London. They were objecting to the transport of fish on a Sunday.

The station was destroyed by fire along with a train of 14 vehicles, and some luggage vans, on 16 October 1891.

== Facilities ==
Facilities at the station are minimal, consisting of a shelter, a help point, a bench and cycle racks. The station is step-free. As there are no facilities to purchase tickets, passengers must buy one in advance, or from the guard on the train. The original station buildings no longer exist. The former stationmaster's house is available as accommodation for large groups.

== Passenger volume ==
Passenger Volume at Stromeferry
	2004–05	2005–06	2006–07	2007–08	2008–09	2009–10	2010–11	2011–12	2012–13	2013–14	2014–15	2015–16	2016–17	2017–18	2018–19	2019–20	2020–21	2021–22	2022–23	2023–24	2024–25
Entries and exits	1,035	1,163	1,146	1,012	1,000	1,064	1,438	2,218	2,074	1,874	1,634	1,560	1,254	1,378	1,274	1,508	136	918	1,144	1,104	1,132

The statistics cover twelve month periods that start in April.

== Services ==
Four trains each way call on weekdays/Saturdays and one each way all year on Sundays, plus a second from May to late September only.

Preceding station	National Rail	Following station
Attadale	ScotRail; Kyle of Lochalsh Line	Duncraig
	Historical railways	
Attadale; Line and station open	Highland Railway; Dingwall and Skye Railway; Kyle of Lochalsh Extension	Duncraig; Line and station open

== Bibliography ==
- Brailsford, Martyn, ed. (December 2017) [1987]. Railway Track Diagrams 1: Scotland & Isle of Man (6th ed.). Frome: Trackmaps. ISBN 978-0-9549866-9-8.
- Butt, R. V. J. (October 1995). The Directory of Railway Stations: details every public and private passenger station, halt, platform and stopping place, past and present (1st ed.). Sparkford: Patrick Stephens Ltd. ISBN 978-1-85260-508-7. OCLC 60251199. OL 11956311M.
- McRae, Andrew (1997). British Railway Camping Coach Holidays: The 1930s & British Railways (London Midland Region). Vol. Scenes from the Past: 30 (Part One). Foxline. ISBN 1-870119-48-7.
- McRae, Andrew (1998). British Railways Camping Coach Holidays: A Tour of Britain in the 1950s and 1960s. Vol. Scenes from the Past: 30 (Part Two). Foxline. ISBN 1-870119-53-3.
