= Plockton railway station =

Railway station in Highland, Scotland

Plockton Scottish Gaelic: Am Ploc
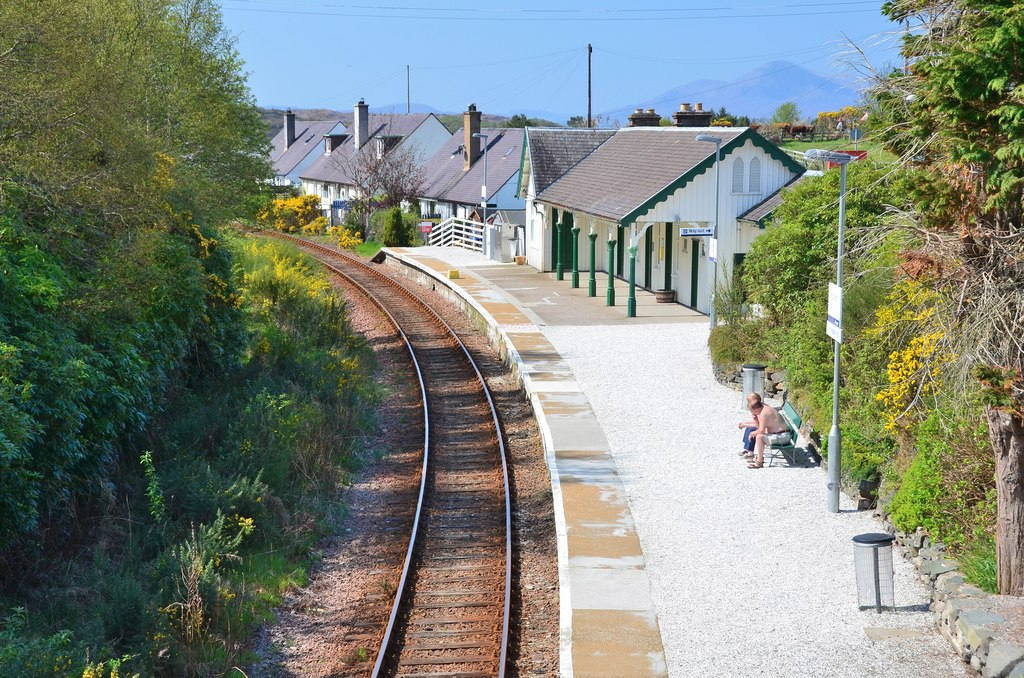

General information
- Location: Plockton, Highland; Scotland
- Coordinates: 57.3336°N 5.6659°W
- Grid reference: NG794329
- Manager: ScotRail
- Platforms: 1

Other information
- Station code: PLK

History
- Original company: Highland Railway
- Pre-grouping: Highland Railway
- Post-grouping: LMSR

Key dates
- 2 November 1897: Opened

Passengers
- 2021/22: ▲9,476
- 2022/23: ▼8,530
- 2023/24: ▲10,816
- 2024/25: ▼10,396
- 2025/26: ▲10,852

Listed Building – Category B
- Designated: 16 December 1986
- Reference no.: LB6932
Location
Notes
- Passenger statistics from the Office of Rail and Road

Plockton railway station is a railway station on the Kyle of Lochalsh Line, serving the village of Plockton in the Highlands, north-west Scotland. The station is 58 miles 22 chains (93.8 km) from Dingwall, between Duncraig and Duirinish. ScotRail, who manage the station, operate all services here.

== History ==
The station was built by the Kyle of Lochalsh Extension (Highland Railway) between Stromeferry and Kyle of Lochalsh, opening on 2 November 1897.

The station building was built by the Highland Railway, and designed by engineer Murdoch Paterson. It was B-listed by Historic Scotland in 1986. A camping coach was positioned here by the Scottish Region from 1956 to 1964, for the last two years a Pullman camping coach was used.

The building was completely renovated during 2009/2010 and is now a privately owned self-catering holiday cottage.

== Facilities ==
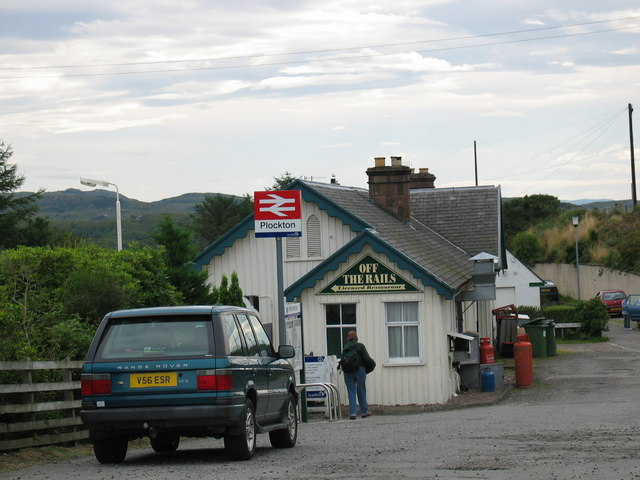
The station building

The only facilities at the station are a car park, a help point, a bench and bike racks. The station has step-free access. As there are no facilities to purchase tickets, passengers must buy one in advance, or from the guard on the train.

== Passenger volume ==
Passenger Volume at Plockton
	2004–05	2005–06	2006–07	2007–08	2008–09	2009–10	2010–11	2011–12	2012–13	2013–14	2014–15	2015–16	2016–17	2017–18	2018–19	2019–20	2020–21	2021–22	2022–23	2023–24	2024–25
Entries and exits	8,934	7,992	8,295	8,605	9,230	10,716	11,186	13,038	12,886	13,876	12,826	11,574	9,998	10,592	11,482	11,616	1,784	9,476	8,530	10,816	10,396

The statistics cover twelve month periods that start in April.

== Services ==
Four trains each way call on weekdays and Saturdays. On Sundays, there is only one train each way, plus a second from May to late September only.

Preceding station	National Rail	Following station
Duncraig	ScotRail; Kyle of Lochalsh Line	Duirinish
	Historical railways	
Duncraig; Line and station open	Highland Railway; Kyle of Lochalsh Extension	Duirinish; Line and station open

== Bibliography ==
- Brailsford, Martyn, ed. (December 2017) [1987]. Railway Track Diagrams 1: Scotland & Isle of Man (6th ed.). Frome: Trackmaps. ISBN 978-0-9549866-9-8.
- Butt, R. V. J. (October 1995). The Directory of Railway Stations: details every public and private passenger station, halt, platform and stopping place, past and present (1st ed.). Sparkford: Patrick Stephens Ltd. ISBN 978-1-85260-508-7. OCLC 60251199. OL 11956311M.
- McRae, Andrew (1998). British Railways Camping Coach Holidays: A Tour of Britain in the 1950s and 1960s. Vol. Scenes from the Past: 30 (Part Two). Foxline. ISBN 1-870119-53-3.
