= Plockton =

Village in the Scottish Highlands

Coordinates: 57.33801°N 5.65231°W

Plockton: Scottish Gaelic: Am Ploc
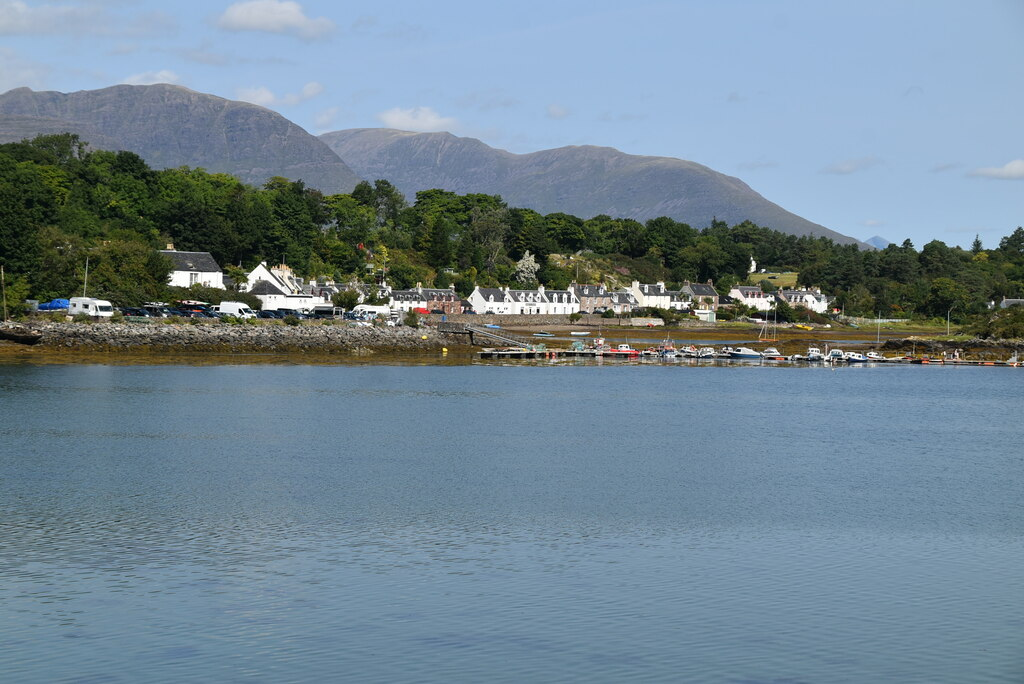
- Plockton as viewed from the bay

- Location within the Highland council area
- Population: 378
- OS grid reference: NG803334
- Community council: Plockton
- Council area: Highland
- Lieutenancy area: Ross and Cromarty
- Country: Scotland
- Sovereign state: United Kingdom
- Post town: PLOCKTON
- Postcode district: IV52
- Dialling code: 01599
- Police: Scotland
- Fire: Scottish
- Ambulance: Scottish
- UK Parliament: Inverness, Skye and West Ross-shire
- Scottish Parliament: Skye, Lochaber and Badenoch
- Website: Plockton & District Community website

Plockton (Scottish Gaelic: Am Ploc/Ploc Loch Aillse) is a village in the Lochalsh, Wester Ross area of the Scottish Highlands with a 2020 population of 468. Plockton settlement is on the shores of Loch Carron. It faces east, away from the prevailing winds; this, together with the North Atlantic Drift, gives it a mild climate despite the far-north latitude, allowing the Cordyline australis cabbage tree to prosper.

== History ==
Plockton was established as a planned fishing village on the northern edge of the Lochalsh, built "when introducing sheep farming in 1814-20 and removing the population from their old hamlets in Glen Garron, founded the villages of Jeantown and Plockton on Loch Carronside" (Geddes: 1945, pp38).

A local laird transformed the community into a prosperous fishery, and in the process, funded the planned village. Most of the houses date from the nineteenth and twentieth centuries.

Some maritime charts, including MacKenzie (1776) and Heather (1804), mark the peninsula where the village sits as 'Plack'; however, it is generally considered that the village was built on the 'Ploc' of Lochalsh, with 'Ploc' being understood in Gaelic as pimple or bump (of Lochalsh). This usage is shared with other places such as the Plock of Kyle and Plocrapool on the Isle of Harris. Until the end of the eighteenth century, the fishing hamlet, as it was then, was known as Am Ploc (meaning 'blunt promontory' in Gaelic). The ‘-ton’ (from 'town') was added to designate it as such in the English language, following the construction of the planned village around 1800.

== Facilities ==
The village has a small general store with a café; a takeaway; a restaurant; newsagent and craft shop; three hotels with pubs; numerous B&Bs; library with free internet access and a village hall, which holds community events and art exhibitions. The Church of Scotland house of worship in the village, also used by the Free Church of Scotland, was designed by Thomas Telford. The village is served by Plockton railway station, on the Kyle of Lochalsh Line, and the short Plockton Airfield, operated by the Highland Council, is for light aircraft and microlights.

Nearby is Duncraig Castle, a nineteenth-century stately home built by the Matheson family. The castle was derelict for many years, having had a variety of commercial uses.

Plockton has been a popular location for many artists including those from The Edinburgh School (Adam Bruce Thomson, David Macbeth Sutherland) and continues to attract artists.

== Geography and tourism ==
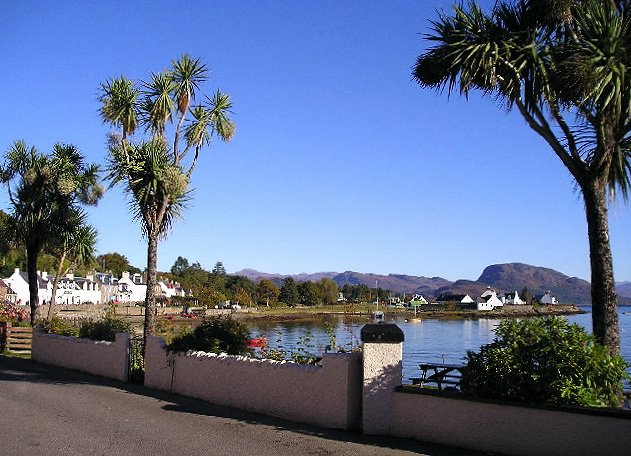
The mild climate permits cultivation of palm-like cabbage trees

Situated on a sheltered inlet of Loch Carron, and due to the series of New Zealand cabbage trees which have dominated Harbour Street since the 1960s, Plockton has been described as having a distinctive "sub-tropical appearance". Most of the land around Plockton is within the Balmacara Estate, owned by the National Trust for Scotland.

Plockton lies about 10km (6miles) northeast of Kyle of Lochalsh, and is reached by road along single-track roads that go between Kyle of Lochalsh on the A87, and Achmore on the A890.

The village is a tourist resort, often having many tourists and day-trippers in peak season. It has been deemed "arguably the prettiest village in the highlands". The television series Hamish Macbeth, starring Robert Carlyle, was filmed there, substituting for the fictional Lochdubh. Plockton was also used for various scenes in the film The Wicker Man and the Inspector Alleyn Mysteries television series.

== Education ==
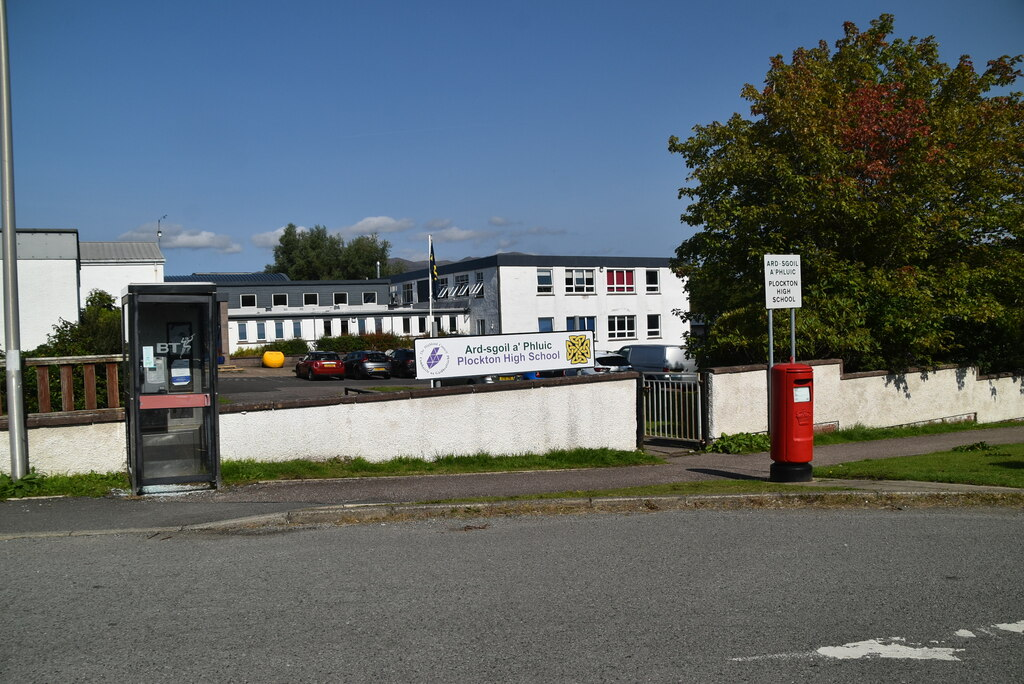
Plockton High School in the village

Plockton is home to Sgoil Chiùil na Gàidhealtachd - the National Centre For Excellence in Traditional Music at Plockton High School, which also serves the village and a wide surrounding area. The school also hosts the Am Bàta project, teaching pupils in the art of boat building, from which a number of 'local' style boats have been produced. Some have been donated to the local sailing club - Plockton Small Boat Sailing Club - whilst others have been sold to the public. Plockton was home between 1956 and 1972 to the Gaelic scholar Sorley MacLean, (Somhairle MacGill-Eain) whilst headmaster at the high school, who introduced the teaching of Gaelic and championed shinty.

Since 1991 Plockton Primary School has accommodated a Gaelic-medium education unit (GMU), where instruction is through the medium of Gaelic. 24.4% of the population in the catchment area of Plockton Primary School reports being able to speak Gaelic – the highest incidence of Gaelic-speaking on the mainland of Scotland.

== Football club ==
From 1954 the village played host to Plockton Amateur Football Club. However, from 2016, the club has been in abeyance. Plockton FC played at the Alasdair Ross Memorial Park and competed in yellow and black strips - reflected in their "Bumble Bees" nickname. They were formerly members of the West Highland Amateur Football Association.

== Media ==
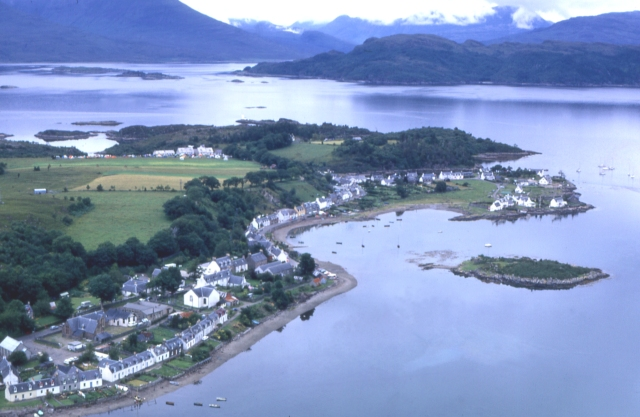
Aerial view of Plockton

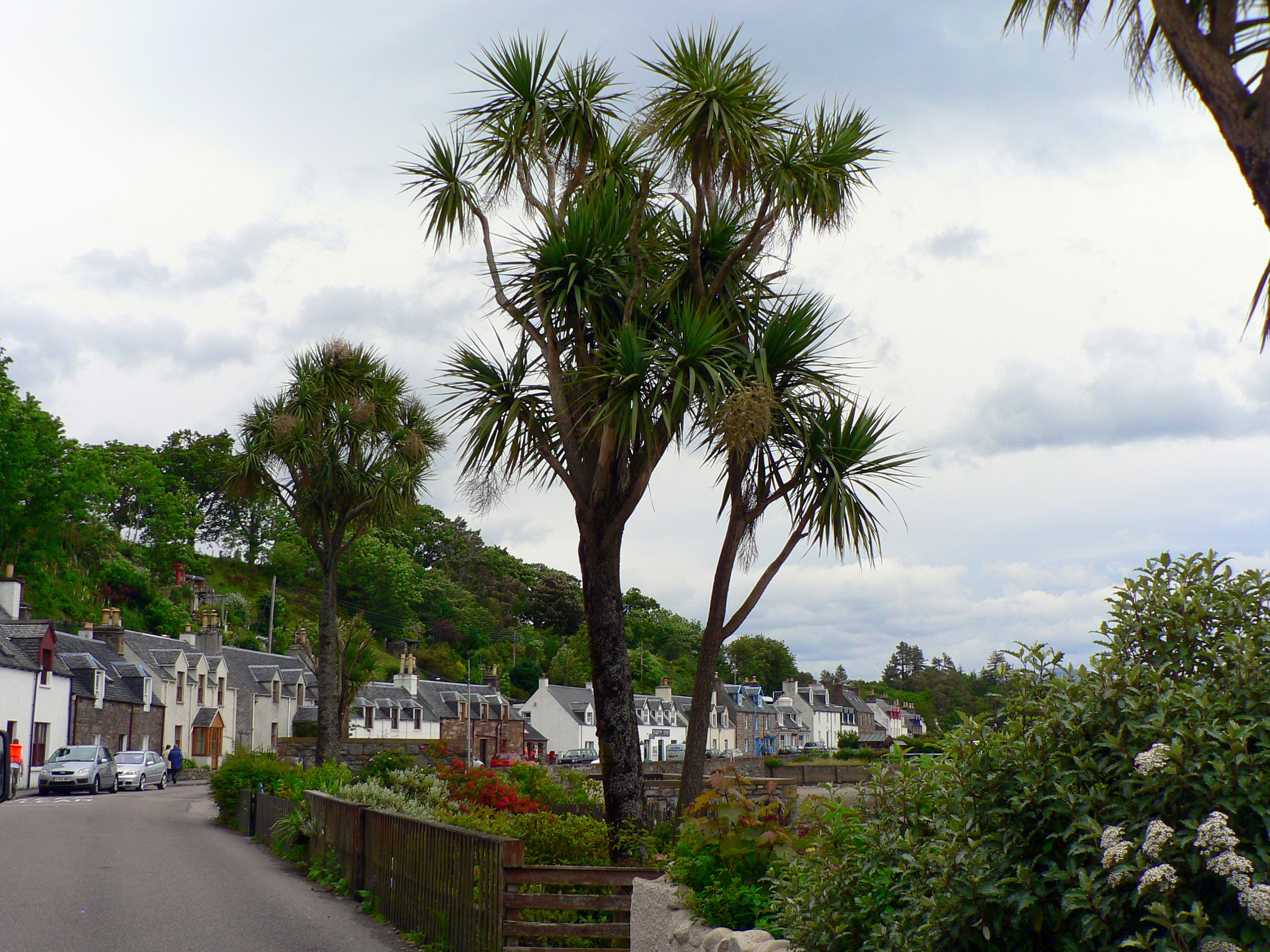
Harbour Street, the main street in Plockton

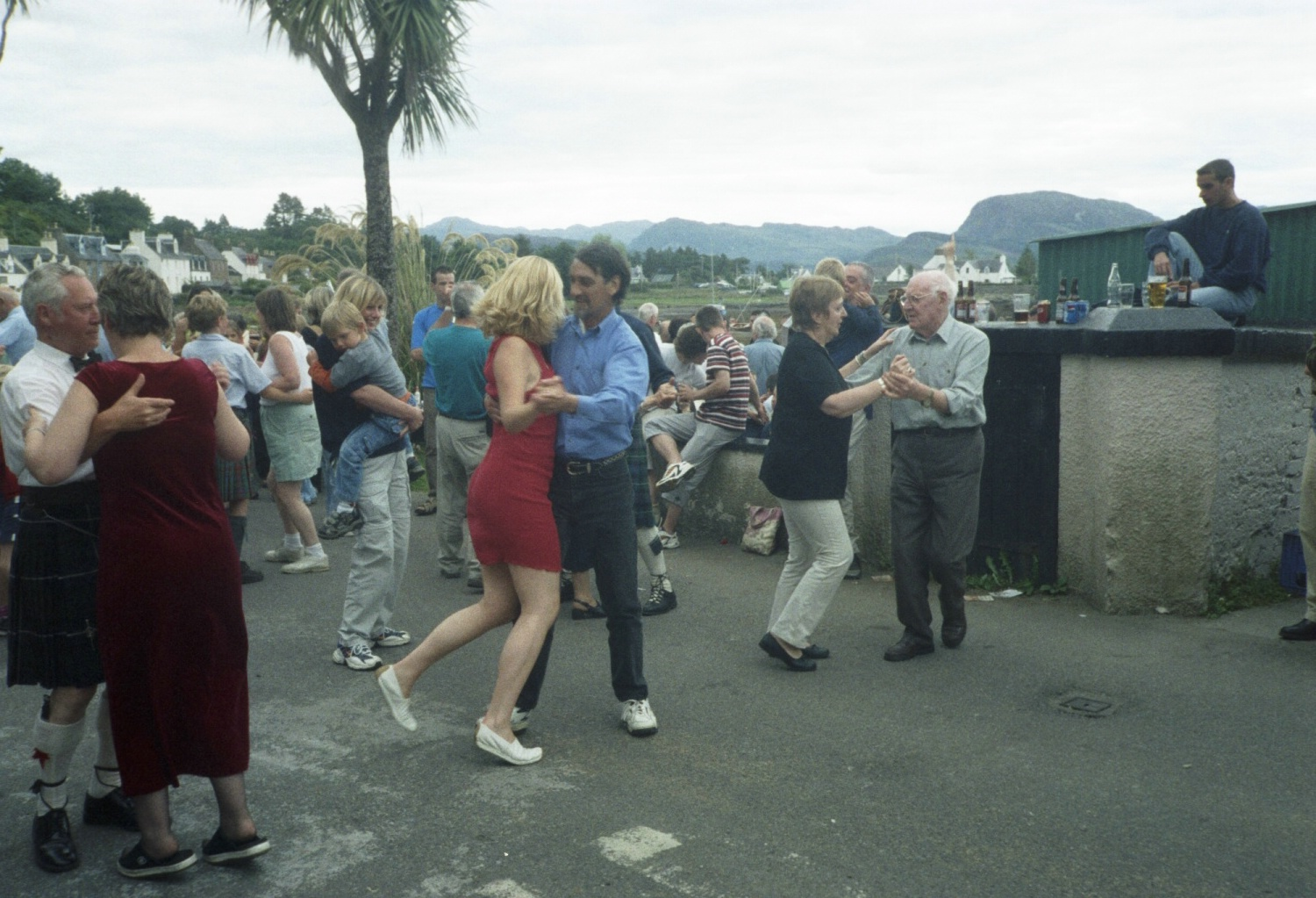
Street dancing on the last day of the Regatta fortnight

== Climate ==
The Met Office operates a weather station at Plockton, for which 30 year averages are available. As with the rest of the British Isles, Plockton experiences a maritime climate with cool summers and mild winters. The highest temperature was 27.7 °C recorded on 9 May 2016, and the lowest was –9.8 °C.

Climate data for Duirinish-Plockton, 18m asl, (average highs and lows 1971-2000)
Month	Jan	Feb	Mar	Apr	May	Jun	Jul	Aug	Sep	Oct	Nov	Dec	Year
Record high °C (°F)	14.9 (58.8)	11.3 (52.3)	17.9 (64.2)	18.9 (66.0)	27.7 (81.9)	20.8 (69.4)	22.1 (71.8)	22.1 (71.8)	19.6 (67.3)	15.9 (60.6)	12.3 (54.1)	17.2 (63.0)	29.4 (84.9)
Mean daily maximum °C (°F)	7.2 (45.0)	7.5 (45.5)	8.9 (48.0)	11.2 (52.2)	14.7 (58.5)	16.2 (61.2)	17.7 (63.9)	17.5 (63.5)	15.2 (59.4)	12.5 (54.5)	9.4 (48.9)	7.7 (45.9)	12.1 (53.9)
Mean daily minimum °C (°F)	2.0 (35.6)	2.1 (35.8)	2.9 (37.2)	4.1 (39.4)	6.4 (43.5)	8.7 (47.7)	10.8 (51.4)	10.7 (51.3)	8.9 (48.0)	6.9 (44.4)	4.1 (39.4)	2.7 (36.9)	5.9 (42.5)
Record low °C (°F)	−8.3 (17.1)	−7.3 (18.9)	−8.2 (17.2)	−9.8 (14.4)	−9.3 (15.3)	−5.5 (22.1)	1.8 (35.2)	−3.0 (26.6)	−5.0 (23.0)	−5.5 (22.1)	−8.2 (17.2)	−9.4 (15.1)	−9.8 (14.4)
Source 1: 1971-2000 averages
Source 2: Met Office and Voodoo Skies

== See also ==
- Port an Eòrna
