= List of listed buildings in Lochalsh =

This is a list of listed buildings in the parish of Lochalsh in Highland, Scotland. It includes the area around Kyle of Lochalsh, Plockton, Duirinish, Stromeferry, Ardelve Balmacara and Auchertyre.

== List ==
| Name | Location | Date Listed | Grid Ref. (Note: Sometimes known as OSGB36, the grid reference (where provided) is based on the British national grid reference system used by the Ordnance Survey. • "Guide to National Grid". Ordnance Survey. • "Get-a-map". Ordnance Survey.) | Geo-coordinates | Notes | LB Number (Note: Historic Environment Scotland assign a unique alphanumeric identifier to each designated site in Scotland, for listed buildings this always begins with "LB", for example "LB12345".) | Image |
|---|---|---|---|---|---|---|---|
| Plockton 42 Harbour Street "Heatherstone" | | | | 57°20′18″N 5°39′05″W | Category C(S) | 6919 | Upload Photo |
| Plockton Innes Street The Craft Shop | | | | 57°20′16″N 5°39′05″W | Category C(S) | 6924 | Upload another image |
| Plockton 4 And 5 Innes Street The Free Church Manse And The Old Schoolhouse | | | | 57°20′15″N 5°39′08″W | Category B | 6926 | Upload Photo |
| Plockton Tulloch Ard (Detached Single Storey Portion Only) | | | | 57°20′25″N 5°38′49″W | Category B | 6931 | Upload another image |
| Plockton 24 And 24A Harbour Street | | | | 57°20′25″N 5°38′59″W | Category C(S) | 6940 | Upload Photo |
| Plockton, 1, 2, 3 Bank Street | | | | 57°20′12″N 5°39′09″W | Category C(S) | 6955 | Upload Photo |
| Plockton, 8, 9, 10 Bank Street | | | | 57°20′11″N 5°39′11″W | Category C(S) | 6958 | Upload Photo |
| Plockton 6 Harbour Street | | | | 57°20′32″N 5°38′58″W | Category C(S) | 6964 | Upload Photo |
| Plockton 7 Harbour Street | | | | 57°20′32″N 5°38′58″W | Category C(S) | 6965 | Upload Photo |
| Plockton 8 Harbour Street "Ulluva", And 8A Harbour Street "Struan" | | | | 57°20′31″N 5°38′58″W | Category C(S) | 6966 | Upload Photo |
| Duirinish No 287 | | | | 57°19′06″N 5°40′47″W | Category C(S) | 6978 | Upload Photo |
| Duirinish No 293 (Executors Late Mr Nicholson) | | | | 57°19′08″N 5°40′45″W | Category C(S) | 6986 | Upload Photo |
| Duirinish Byre/Barns | | | | 57°19′08″N 5°40′52″W | Category B | 6988 | Upload Photo |
| Duncraig Castle, Laundry, Stables And Walled Garden | | | | 57°20′07″N 5°37′56″W | Category C(S) | 6989 | Upload another image See more images |
| Kirkton Of Lochalsh, Tulloch Ard (Former Lochalsh Manse) And Steading | | | | 57°16′40″N 5°36′32″W | Category C(S) | 6991 | Upload Photo |
| Balmacara Farm Square | | | | 57°17′32″N 5°38′35″W | Category B | 7002 | Upload Photo |
| Duirinish Mr D Maclennan | | | | 57°19′05″N 5°40′39″W | Category C(S) | 7004 | Upload Photo |
| Plockton 41 Harbour Street Plockton Hotel | | | | 57°20′18″N 5°39′06″W | Category B | 6918 | Upload Photo |
| Plockton 28 Harbour Street | | | | 57°20′24″N 5°39′01″W | Category C(S) | 6944 | Upload Photo |
| Plockton 6, 7 Bank Street | | | | 57°20′11″N 5°39′11″W | Category C(S) | 6957 | Upload Photo |
| Plockton 4 And 5 Harbour Street | | | | 57°20′32″N 5°38′58″W | Category C(S) | 6963 | Upload Photo |
| Plockton 17 Harbour Street | | | | 57°20′28″N 5°38′57″W | Category C(S) | 6973 | Upload Photo |
| Duirinish, Ardross | | | | 57°19′05″N 5°40′41″W | Category C(S) | 6974 | Upload Photo |
| Duirinish Sir Torquil And Lady Matheson | | | | 57°19′09″N 5°40′47″W | Category C(S) | 6982 | Upload Photo |
| Kirkton Of Lochalsh, Tulloch Ard (Former Lochalsh Manse) Barn | | | | 57°16′42″N 5°36′31″W | Category C(S) | 6992 | Upload Photo |
| Achmore Fernaig Farm Barn | | | | 57°20′36″N 5°34′50″W | Category B | 6995 | Upload Photo |
| Achmore Farm Farmhouse And Steading | | | | 57°20′34″N 5°33′44″W | Category C(S) | 6996 | Upload Photo |
| Ardelve, 12 Lower Ardelve | | | | 57°16′52″N 5°31′43″W | Category A | 6999 | Upload another image |
| Plockton 1 Innes Street The Studio | | | | 57°20′17″N 5°39′07″W | Category B | 6921 | Upload Photo |
| Plockton 21 (Post Office) And 21A Harbour Street | | | | 57°20′26″N 5°38′58″W | Category C(S) | 6937 | Upload Photo |
| Plockton 22 Harbour Street | | | | 57°20′26″N 5°38′58″W | Category C(S) | 6938 | Upload Photo |
| Plockton 37 Harbour Street | | | | 57°20′20″N 5°39′05″W | Category C(S) | 6950 | Upload Photo |
| Plockton, 11, 12, 13, 14 Bank Street | | | | 57°20′10″N 5°39′14″W | Category C(S) | 6959 | Upload Photo |
| Plockton 15 And 16 Harbour Street | | | | 57°20′28″N 5°38′57″W | Category C(S) | 6972 | Upload Photo |
| Duirinish Miss Macrae's House | | | | 57°19′06″N 5°40′46″W | Category C(S) | 6977 | Upload Photo |
| Duirinish Mr Roddy Morris' House | | | | 57°19′09″N 5°40′48″W | Category C(S) | 6981 | Upload Photo |
| Duirinish Dun Caan (Mrs Frost) | | | | 57°19′09″N 5°40′47″W | Category C(S) | 6983 | Upload Photo |
| Kyleakin Lighthouse, Eilean Bàn | | | | 57°16′40″N 5°44′33″W | Category B | 6994 | Upload another image See more images |
| Ardelve, Slipway | | | | 57°16′41″N 5°31′11″W | Category B | 6998 | Upload another image See more images |
| Plockton Rudha Mor | | | | 57°20′38″N 5°38′56″W | Category C(S) | 6930 | Upload Photo |
| Plockton 19 Harbour Street | | | | 57°20′27″N 5°38′57″W | Category C(S) | 6935 | Upload Photo |
| Plockton 35 Harbour Street | | | | 57°20′21″N 5°39′05″W | Category C(S) | 6948 | Upload Photo |
| Plockton 38 Harbour Street "Sannachan" | | | | 57°20′20″N 5°39′05″W | Category B | 6951 | Upload Photo |
| Plockton Cooper Street Tigh-An-Fhaing | | | | 57°20′30″N 5°38′43″W | Category B | 6960 | Upload Photo |
| Plockton 9 Harbour Street "Alt Na Creag" | | | | 57°20′31″N 5°38′58″W | Category C(S) | 6967 | Upload Photo |
| Plockton 11, 12 Harbour Street | | | | 57°20′30″N 5°38′57″W | Category C(S) | 6969 | Upload Photo |
| Plockton 14 Harbour Street | | | | 57°20′29″N 5°38′57″W | Category C(S) | 6971 | Upload Photo |
| Duirinish, Drumfearn | | | | 57°19′05″N 5°40′43″W | Category C(S) | 6975 | Upload Photo |
| 43 Harbour Street | | | | 57°20′18″N 5°39′05″W | Category B | 6920 | Upload Photo |
| Plockton 2 Innes Street | | | | 57°20′16″N 5°39′07″W | Category B | 6922 | Upload Photo |
| Plockton 3 Innes Street "The Haven" | | | | 57°20′16″N 5°39′08″W | Category C(S) | 6923 | Upload Photo |
| Plockton, Innes Street, Plockton Church (Church Of Scotland) And Graveyard Including Drystone Wall | | | | 57°20′14″N 5°39′09″W | Category A | 6927 | Upload another image See more images |
| Plockton Railway Station | | | | 57°20′01″N 5°39′58″W | Category B | 6932 | Upload another image See more images |
| Plockton 36 Harbour Street | | | | 57°20′20″N 5°39′05″W | Category C(S) | 6949 | Upload Photo |
| Plockton 39 Harbour Street | | | | 57°20′19″N 5°39′05″W | Category B | 6952 | Upload Photo |
| Plockton 40 Harbour Street | | | | 57°20′19″N 5°39′05″W | Category B | 6953 | Upload Photo |
| Plockton 3 Harbour Street | | | | 57°20′34″N 5°38′58″W | Category C(S) | 6962 | Upload Photo |
| Duirinish Mrs Gunn's House | | | | 57°19′07″N 5°40′44″W | Category C(S) | 6987 | Upload Photo |
| Kirkton Of Lochalsh Lochalsh Parish Church (Church Of Scotland) And Walled Graveyard | | | | 57°17′02″N 5°36′13″W | Category B | 6990 | Upload another image See more images |
| Kirkton Of Lochalsh, Barn | | | | 57°17′03″N 5°36′08″W | Category C(S) | 6993 | Upload another image |
| Duncraig Halt | | | | 57°20′13″N 5°38′13″W | Category B | 44180 | Upload another image See more images |
| Innes Street Plockton Free Church And Churchyard Walls | | | | 57°20′16″N 5°39′06″W | Category B | 6925 | Upload Photo |
| Plockton, Innes Street, Old Manse Including Drystone Wall | | | | 57°20′15″N 5°39′11″W | Category B | 6928 | Upload Photo |
| Plockton 20 Harbour Street | | | | 57°20′26″N 5°38′57″W | Category C(S) | 6936 | Upload Photo |
| Plockton 27 Harbour Street | | | | 57°20′24″N 5°39′00″W | Category C(S) | 6943 | Upload Photo |
| Kyle Of Lochalsh Railway Station and Pier | | | | 57°16′48″N 5°42′50″W | Category B | 6954 | Upload another image See more images |
| Duirinish An Lios | | | | 57°19′07″N 5°40′50″W | Category C(S) | 6979 | Upload Photo |
| Duirinish Sycamore | | | | 57°19′07″N 5°40′48″W | Category C(S) | 6980 | Upload Photo |
| Duirinish Colonel And Mrs Walker's House | | | | 57°19′08″N 5°40′46″W | Category C(S) | 6985 | Upload Photo |
| Auchtertyre Farm, Barn And Steading | | | | 57°17′15″N 5°35′26″W | Category C(S) | 7000 | Upload Photo |
| Plockton 23 Harbour Street | | | | 57°20′25″N 5°38′59″W | Category B | 6939 | Upload Photo |
| Plockton 32, 33 Harbour Street | | | | 57°20′22″N 5°39′04″W | Category C(S) | 6946 | Upload Photo |
| Plockton 34 Harbour Street | | | | 57°20′22″N 5°39′04″W | Category B | 6947 | Upload Photo |
| Plockton 4, 5 Bank Street | | | | 57°20′12″N 5°39′10″W | Category C(S) | 6956 | Upload Photo |
| Plockton 2 Harbour Street | | | | 57°20′34″N 5°38′59″W | Category C(S) | 6961 | Upload Photo |
| Plockton 10 Harbour Street | | | | 57°20′31″N 5°38′57″W | Category B | 6968 | Upload Photo |
| Duirinish Mrs Nicolson's House | | | | 57°19′08″N 5°40′46″W | Category C(S) | 6984 | Upload Photo |
| Achmore Farm Barn | | | | 57°20′33″N 5°33′44″W | Category B | 6997 | Upload Photo |
| Duirinish Bridge Over Allt Duirinish | | | | 57°19′05″N 5°40′35″W | Category C(S) | 7003 | Upload another image See more images |
| Stromeferry, Former Free Church | | | | 57°21′09″N 5°33′19″W | Category C(S) | 48207 | Upload Photo |
| Plockton Innes Street Primary School | | | | 57°20′12″N 5°39′13″W | Category B | 6929 | Upload Photo |
| Stromeferry, Former Church Of Scotland Mission Church | | | | 57°21′05″N 5°33′14″W | Category C(S) | 6933 | Upload Photo |
| Plockton 18 Harbour Street "Silver Knowes" | | | | 57°20′27″N 5°38′57″W | Category C(S) | 6934 | Upload Photo |
| Plockton 25 Harbour Street | | | | 57°20′25″N 5°39′00″W | Category C(S) | 6941 | Upload Photo |
| Plockton 26 Harbour Street | | | | 57°20′24″N 5°39′00″W | Category B | 6942 | Upload Photo |
| Plockton 13 Harbour Street | | | | 57°20′29″N 5°38′57″W | Category C(S) | 6970 | Upload Photo |
| Duirinish Cleveden | | | | 57°19′06″N 5°40′45″W | Category C(S) | 6976 | Upload Photo |
| Auchtertyre, Former Poorhouse | | | | 57°17′11″N 5°35′04″W | Category C(S) | 7001 | Upload Photo |

== Key ==
The scheme for classifying buildings in Scotland is:

- Category A: "buildings of national or international importance, either architectural or historic; or fine, little-altered examples of some particular period, style or building type."
- Category B: "buildings of regional or more than local importance; or major examples of some particular period, style or building type, which may have been altered."
- Category C: "buildings of local importance; lesser examples of any period, style, or building type, as originally constructed or moderately altered; and simple traditional buildings which group well with other listed buildings."

In March 2016 there were 47,288 listed buildings in Scotland. Of these, 8% were Category A, and 50% were Category B, with the remaining 42% being Category C.

== See also ==
- List of listed buildings in Highland
