= Balmacara Bay =

Remote wide mouthed embayment in Scotland

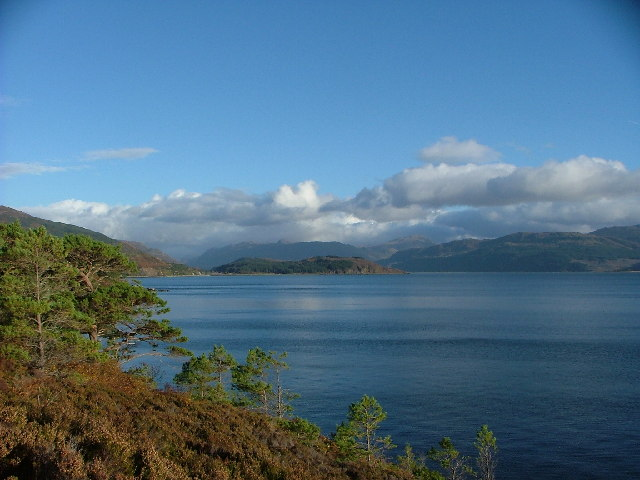
- Ard Hill across Balmacara Bay, Loch Alsh, Scotland. This view along the coast of Loch Alsh was taken from Donald Murchison's Monument

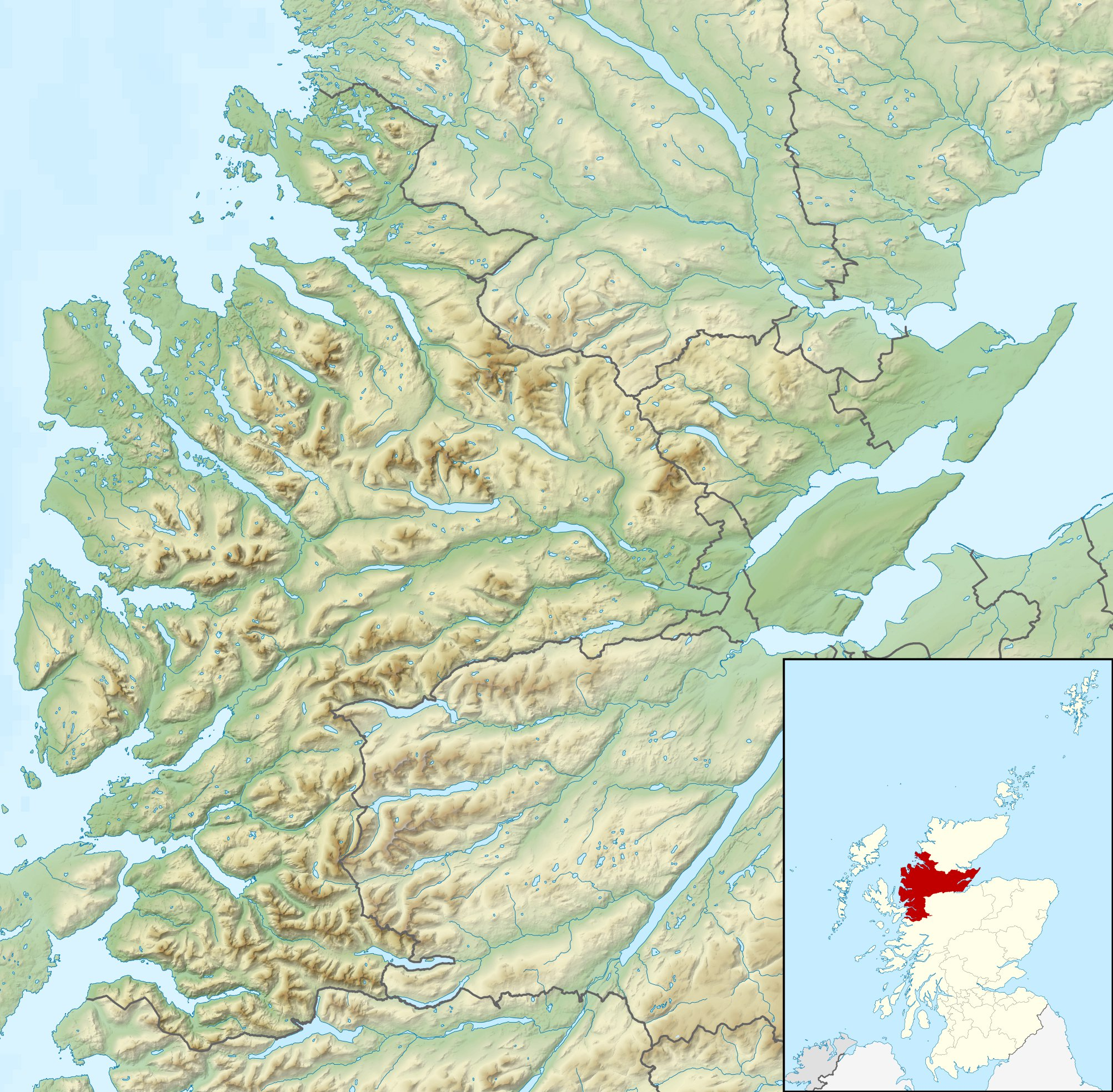
- Location within Ross and Cromarty
- Location: Ross and Cromarty, Scotland
- Coordinates: 57°17′06″N 5°38′49″W
- Ocean/sea sources: Loch Alsh
- Basin countries: Scotland
- Max. length: 0.8 km (0.50 mi)
- Max. width: 3.35 km (2.08 mi)
- Average depth: 60 feet (18 m)
- Settlements: Balmacara

Balmacara Bay is a remote wide mouthed embayment on a 193° orientation, located on the north shore of the Lochalsh peninsula, on the north coast of sea loch of Loch Alsh, and is situated next to the scattered village of Balmacara in the Scottish Highlands on the west coast of Scotland.

== Settlements ==
The 2750-hectare crofting estate of Balmacara Estate was bequeathed to the people of Scotland via the National Trust of Scotland. The estate was bequeathed in 1946 by Lady Margaret Hamilton after her death. In 1954, the Lochalsh House was conveyed to the Trust.

The A87 road passed Balmacara and the bay, following the northern coast of Lochalsh. The Balmacara Hotel, overlooking the Isle of Skye, is located on Balmacara Bay. To the west of the bay is Kyle of Lochalsh and further west, heading north on the peninsula is Erbusaig Bay, to the east is Nostie Bay.

== Geography ==
Balmacara Bay is on the north shore of Loch Alsh, lying on a 193° orientation. To the south of the bay, at about 1 km can be seen the opening of Kyle Rhea that separates the mainland of Scotland from the Isle of Skye, with Beinn na Caillich at 732 metres to the right of the opening. Further to the east of the opening is the small hill of Glas Bheinn at 397 metres. Further east again, and clearly visible from the bay, is the village of Ardintoul and Ardintoul Bay and Ardintoul Point.

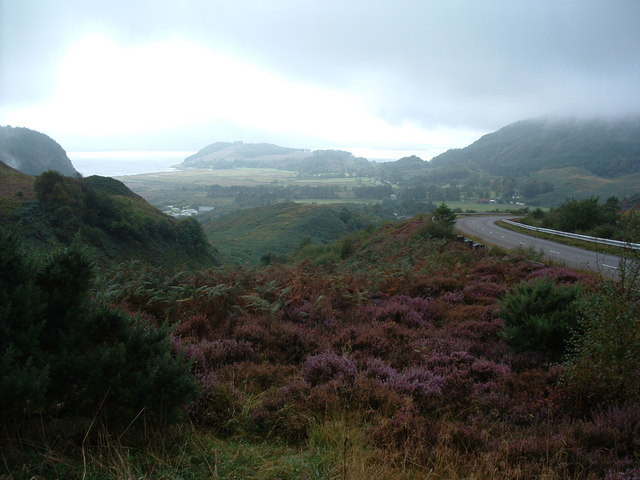
On the road to Auchtertyre

Auchtertyre Hill, at 452m, is the most imposing feature behind the bay. To the west of the bay is the opening of the sea loch, Kyle Akin, which has a small number of islands, including Eileanan Dubha and Eilean Bàn which the A87 road to Kyle of Lochalsh travels over, although not visible from the bay. Slightly south of Kyle of Lochalsh is Kyleakin (Scottish Gaelic: Caol Acain) peninsula and the Rubha Àrd Treisis point, is the opening for the sea loch Loch na Beiste, which is visible from the bay. Behind and to the west of the bay, on the Lochalsh peninsula, is mostly flat.

== Gallery ==
The following images detail the surrounding area, including the village of Balmacara, the bay and views from the bay.

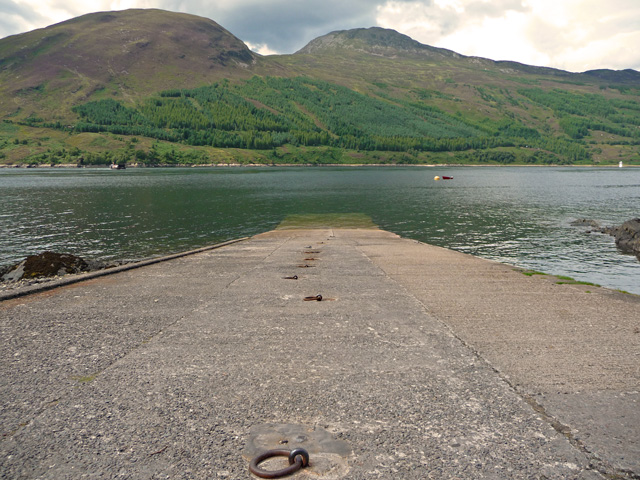
Beinn na Caillich from the slipway at Kyle Rhea

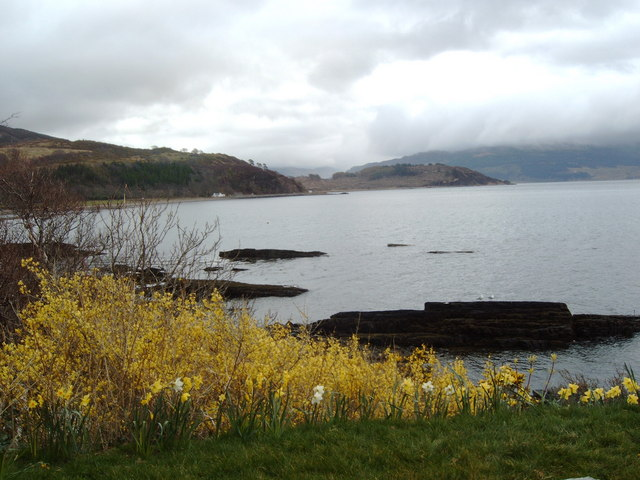
Balmacara Bay.

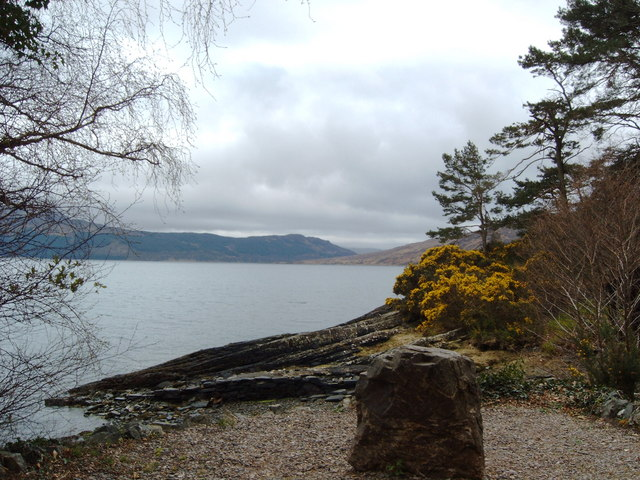
Balmacara Bay from the sunken garden at the Scottish National Trust property.

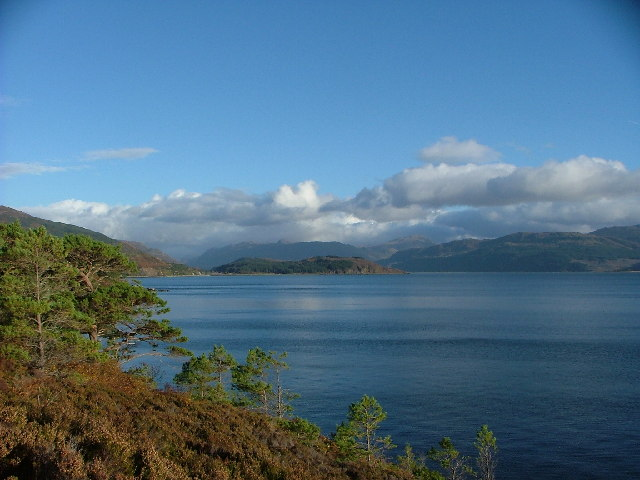
Ard Hill across Balmacara Bay, Loch Alsh, Scotland. This view along the coast of Loch Alsh was taken from Donald Murchison's Monument.

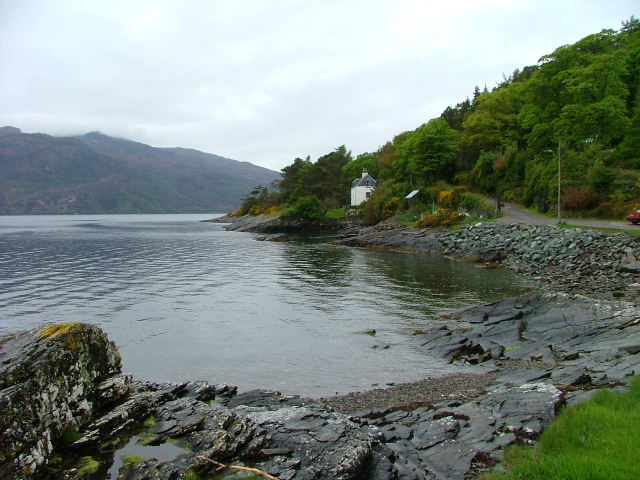
Lochalsh House. In Balmacara Bay.

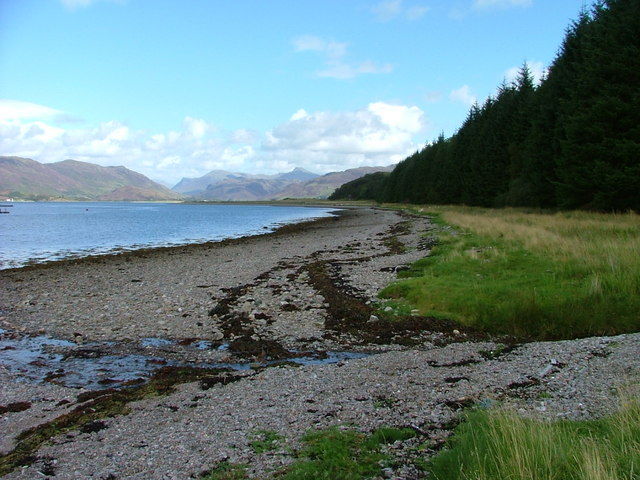
Camas nan Gall Looking east towards Ardintoul Point.

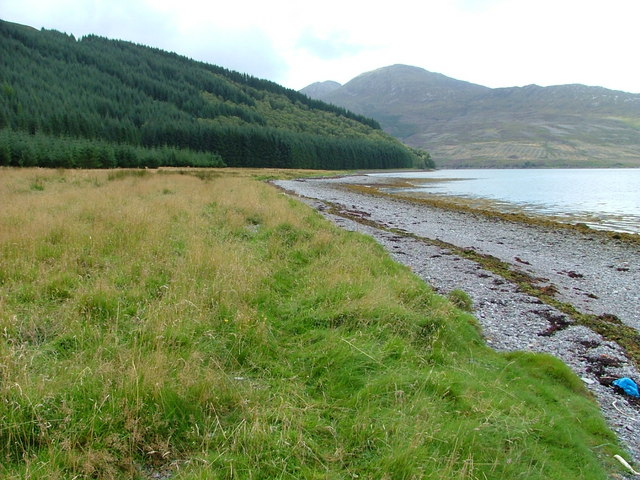
Camas na Gall Looking west towards Skye.

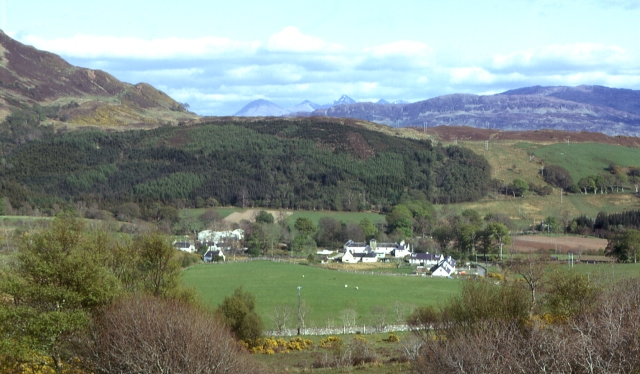
Balmacara Square

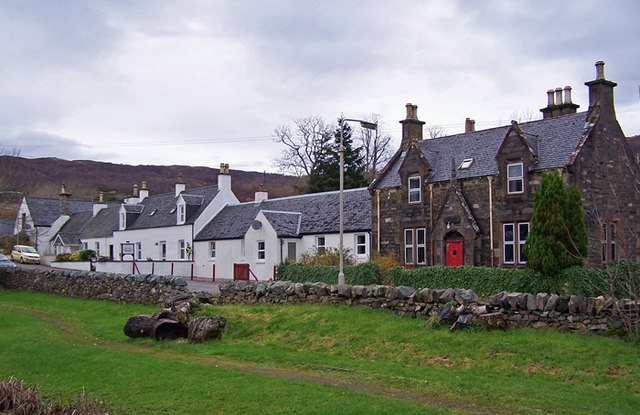
Balmacara Square These buildings face south west across the restored millpond in the centre of The Square.

== See also ==
- List of lochs in Scotland
- List of reservoirs and dams in the United Kingdom
