= Erbusaig Bay =

Bay in Ross and Cromarty, Scotland

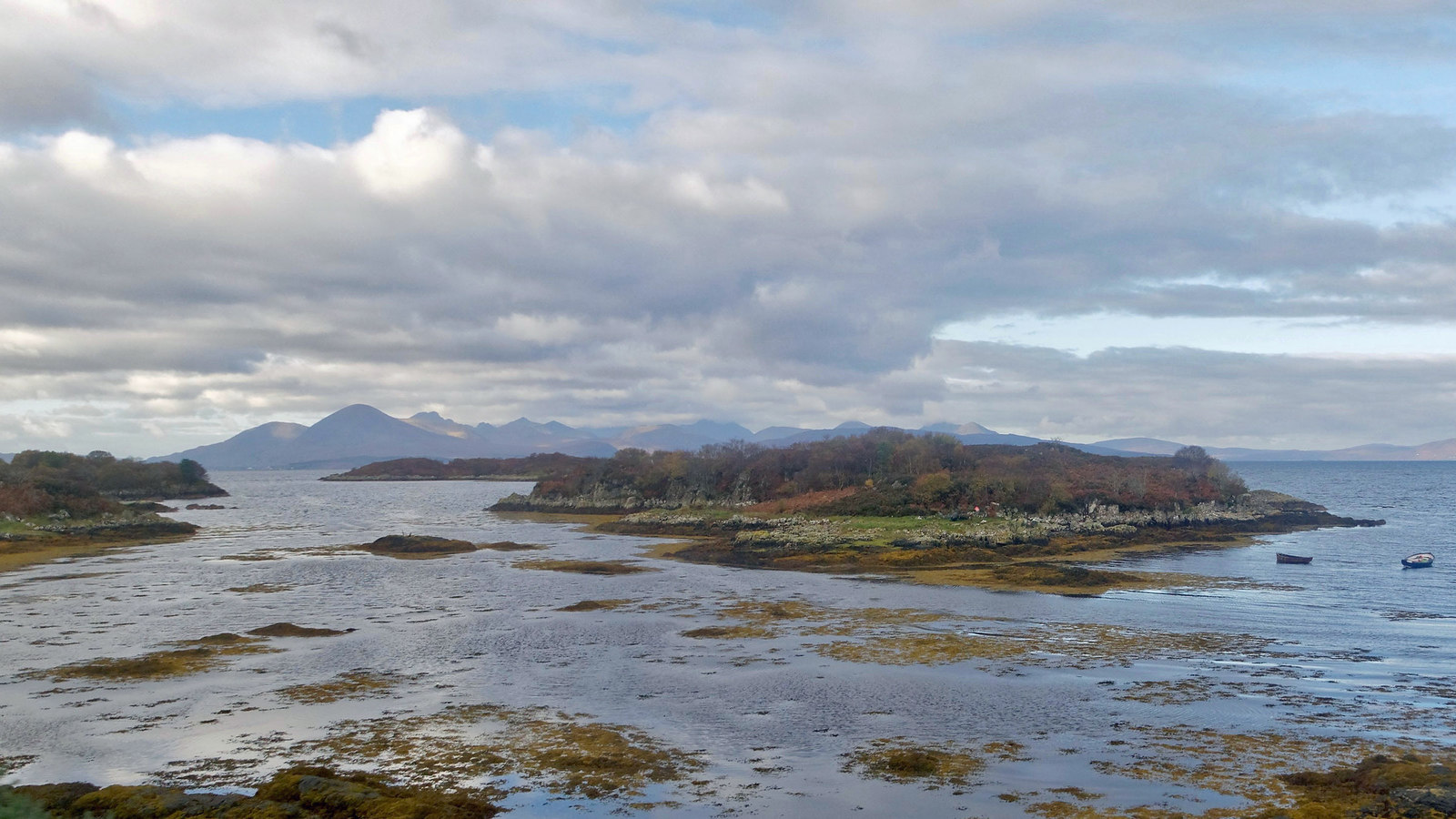
- A view towards the Cuillin Mountains on Skye from the Kyle-bound train as it passes beside Erbusaig Bay.

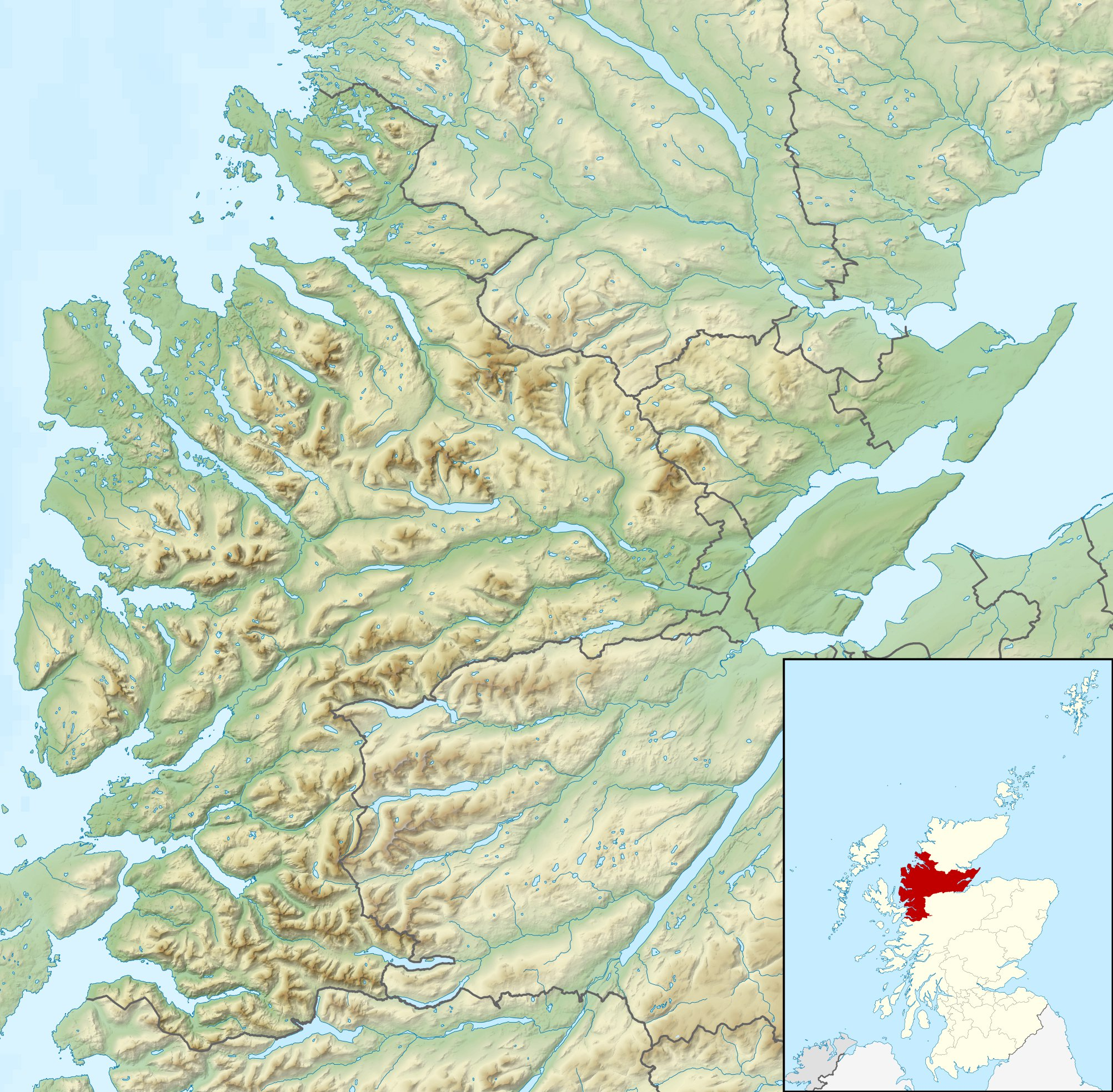
- Location within Ross and Cromarty
- Location: Lochalsh peninsula, Scotland
- Coordinates: 57°18′7.560″N 5°43′26.700″W
- River sources: Erbusaig Burn
- Ocean/sea sources: Inner Sound
- Basin countries: Scotland
- Max. length: 7.4 km (4.6 mi)
- Max. width: 8.85 km (5.50 mi)
- Islands: Black Islands
- Settlements: Erbusaig

Erbusaig Bay is a remote coastal embayment, on a 266° orientation, located on the west coast of the Lochalsh peninsula, in Ross and Cromarty in Scottish Highlands in the west coast of Scotland. At the western side of Erbusaig Bay is the small township of Erbusaig.

== Geography ==
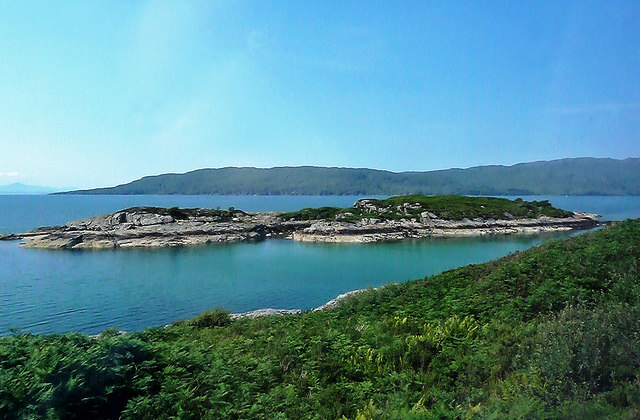
Another view of the islands in Erbusaig Bay

Erbusaig Bay has a classic half circle shape, that faces the island of Scalpay, with the small twin Black Islands in the bottom half of the bay looking north, obscuring the view. The area is dominated by two enormous flat rock hills which plateau in the area. The southern plateau is the higher, rising to 215 feet, while the northern rock plateaux is slightly lower. Both have a slight covering of heather and bracken with bare rock showing regularly. The village of Erbusaig sits at the head of the bay, in a V-shaped plain, which has been eroded from the rock plateau by the Erbusaig Burn. The plain is several feet above the bay. Whitewashed houses dot the plain.

The west coast of Scotland close to Erbusaig Bay is highly fragmented and populated with many hundreds of small islets. Erbusaig Bay has perhaps two dozen itself. the biggest being the Black Islands.

== Settlements ==
Erbusaig is the main settlement at the head of the bay. The main westcoast rail line, passes the bay, and as it passes, the follows the bowl shaped curve of the bay. To the south, is the opening at Kyle of Lochalsh into the sea loch Loch Alsh. Further southwest is the northern shore of Skye on a SW to NE orientation, is Broadford Bay and the village of Broadford. Directly south is the opening of Kyle Rhea, which separates the mainland from Skye.

Access to the bay is by rail or the A87 road, which runs west from its junction with the A82 road at Invergarry (NH307011), along the north shores of Loch Garry and Loch Cluanie, then down through Glen Shiel and along Loch Duich to Kyle of Lochalsh before crossing the Skye Bridge to Kyleakin, Broadford, and Portree, and terminating at Uig in the north of the Isle of Skye. An unnamed B road leaves the A87 at Kyle of Lochalsh, and travels north passing the bay.

== See also ==
- List of lochs in Scotland
- List of reservoirs and dams in the United Kingdom
