= Duirinish =

Duirinish or Diùirinis can refer to several places in Scotland:

- Duirinish, Skye - a peninsula on the island of Skye
- Duirinish, Lochalsh - a settlement in Lochalsh
  - Duirinish railway station - a station at this settlement
