= Loch Anna =

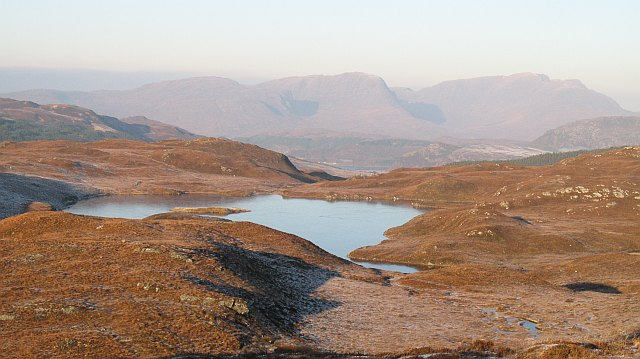

- Location within Highland
- Location: Lochalsh, Scotland
- Coordinates: 57.304000°N 5.524300°W
- Type: freshwater loch
- Primary inflows: Allt Loch Anna
- Basin countries: Scotland
- Max. length: 0.5 km (0.31 mi)
- Surface area: 9.9 ha (24 acres)
- Average depth: 4 m (13 ft)
- Max. depth: 8.2 m (27 ft)
- Water volume: 13,000,000 ft^{3} (370,000 m^{3})
- Shore length^{1}: 1.8 km (1.1 mi)
- Surface elevation: 317 m (1,040 ft)
- Islands: 1
- ^{1} Shore length is not a well-defined measure.

Loch Anna is a small, upland, freshwater loch approximately 2.4 km (1.5 mi) north of Loch Alsh at Ardelve, in Lochalsh, Scotland. It lies in a northwest to southeast direction, is approximately 0.5 km (0.31 mi) in length, and is at an altitude of 317 m (1,040 ft). The loch is irregular in shape, is on average 4 m (13 ft) deep, with a maximum depth of 8.2 m (27 ft). It was surveyed in 1904 by James Murray as part of Sir John Murray's Bathymetrical Survey of Fresh-Water Lochs of Scotland 1897-1909.
