= Erbusaig =

Coordinates: 57.30014°N 5.71451°W

Erbusaig: Scottish Gaelic: Earbarsaig
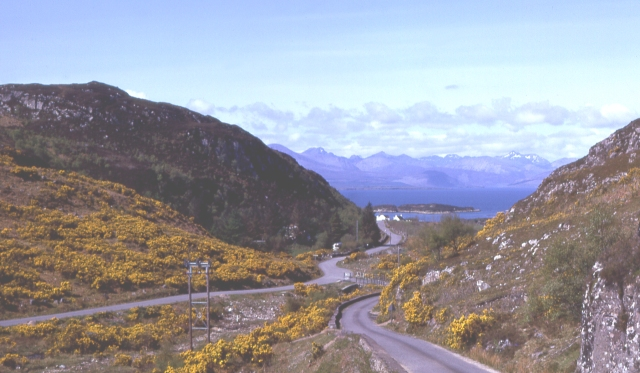

- Location within the Ross and Cromarty area
- OS grid reference: NG763293
- Council area: Highland
- Country: Scotland
- Sovereign state: United Kingdom
- Post town: Kyle of Lochalsh
- Postcode district: IV40 8
- Police: Scotland
- Fire: Scottish
- Ambulance: Scottish

Erbusaig (Scottish Gaelic: Earbarsaig) is a small remote township, situated on Erbusaig Bay near Kyle of Lochalsh, Scottish Highlands and is in the council area of Highland. In the language of Gaelic, the village is named after Erb, a Viking who landed in the Bay. Erbusaig was initially a fishing village, but became cut off from the shore when the railway was extended to Kyle of Lochalsh in 1897.

== Settlements ==
The fishing hamlets of Drumbuie and Duirinish, are situated less than 1 mile northeast.
