= Drumbuie =

Coordinates: 57.31549°N 5.69135°W

Drumbuie: Scottish Gaelic: An Druim Buidhe
- Location within the Ross and Cromarty area
- OS grid reference: NG778310
- Council area: Highland
- Country: Scotland
- Sovereign state: United Kingdom
- Post town: Kyle
- Postcode district: IV40 8
- Police: Scotland
- Fire: Scottish
- Ambulance: Scottish

Drumbuie is a settlement situated less than 1 mile southwest of Duirinish in Lochalsh, Scottish Highlands and is in the council area of Highland.

The fishing hamlet of Erbusaig is located less than one mile to the southwest. Much of the area is within the Balmacara Estate, owned by the National Trust for Scotland.

== Proposed Oil Rig Construction Yard ==
In the 1970s Drumbuie was proposed as the site for an oil rig construction yard. This was opposed by Ross and Cromarty County Council, the National Trust for Scotland, Friends of the Earth, The Conservation Society, and other eco groups. Following a public inquiry, the proposed development was rejected.
