= Eilean Bàn =

Island in Highland council area, Scotland

Eilean Bàn (Gaelic)
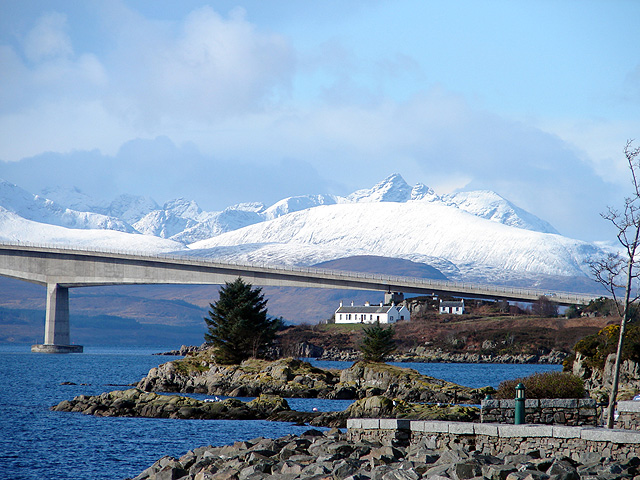
- Eilean Bàn with the Skye Bridge behind

Location
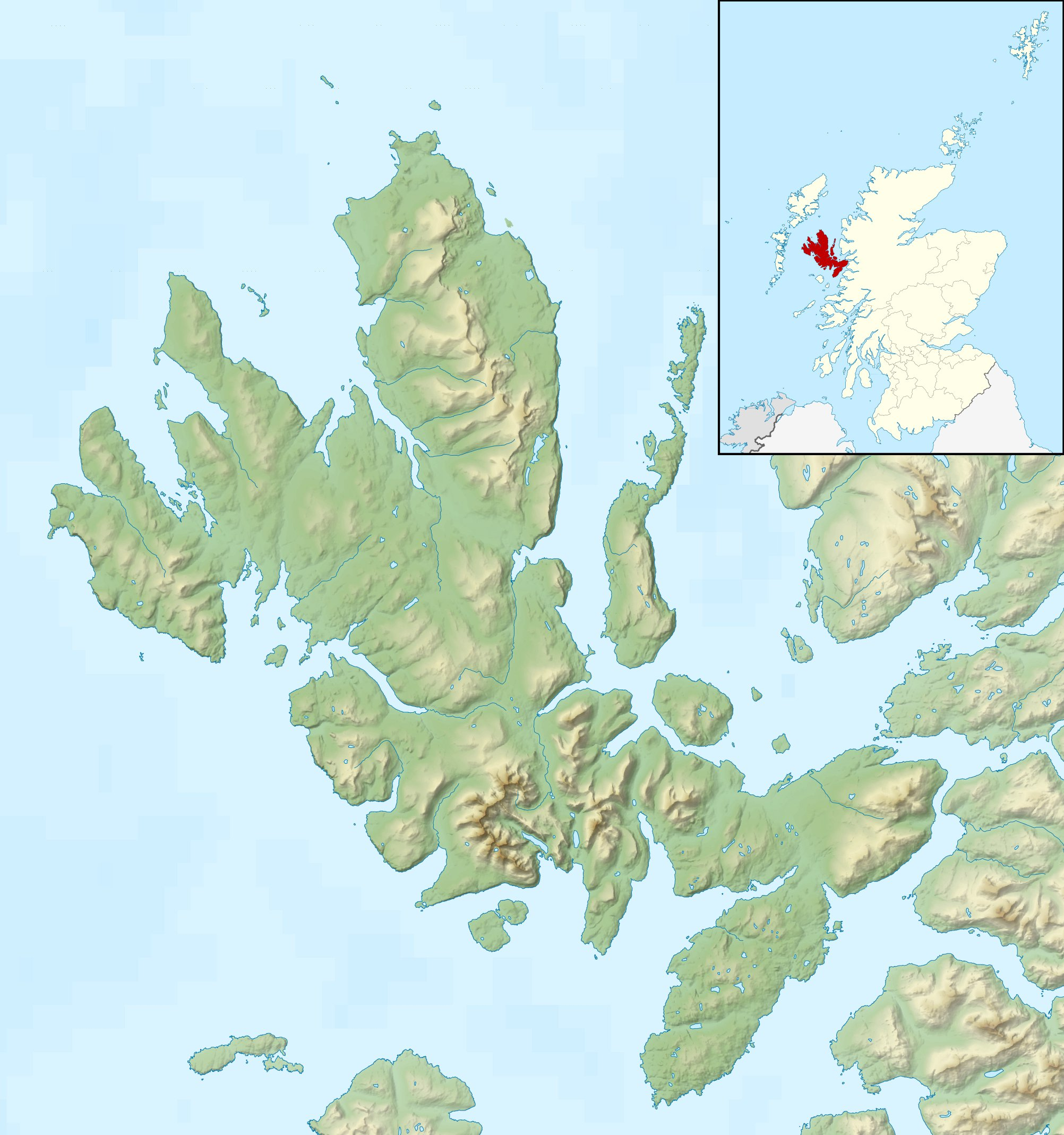
- Location within Isle of Skye
- OS grid reference: NG746271
- Coordinates: 57.28°N 5.74°W

Name
- Gaelic pronunciation: [ˈelan ˈpaːn]
- Name meaning: White Island

Physical geography
- Island group: Skye
- Area: 2.4 ha (6 acres)
- Highest elevation: m

Administration
- Council area: Highland
- Country: Scotland
- Sovereign state: United Kingdom

Demographics
- Population: 0
- Eilean Bàn Lighthouse; Kyleakin
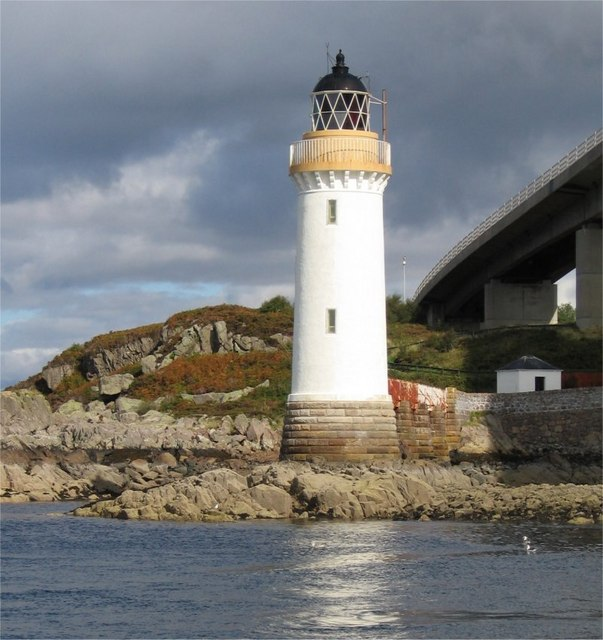
- View of the lighthouse and Skye Bridge above
- Coordinates: 57.277745°N 5.742434°W
- Constructed: 1857
- Construction: masonry tower
- Height: 21 metres (69 ft)
- Shape: cylindrical tower with balcony and lantern
- Markings: white tower, black lantern, ochre trim
- Operator: Eilean Bàn Trust
- Heritage: category B listed building
- Deactivated: 1993 maintained as daybeacon

Eilean Bàn (Scottish Gaelic meaning White Island) is a six-acre (2.4 ha) island between Kyle of Lochalsh and the Isle of Skye, in the historic county of Ross and Cromarty in the Highland local government area. The Skye Bridge uses the island as a stepping-stone as it crosses the mouth of Loch Alsh from the mainland to Skye.

Eilean Bàn was the last home of the author of Ring of Bright Water, Gavin Maxwell. He moved here after his home at Sandaig, which he called Camusfeàrna in his books, was destroyed by fire in 1968. He invited John Lister-Kaye to join him on the island to help build a zoo and work on a book about British wild animals. Both of these had to be abandoned after Maxwell's death in 1969. Lister-Kaye wrote his account of working with Maxwell in his book, The White Island.

Since 1998 the island has been owned by the Eilean Bàn Trust who run it as a nature reserve and holiday lets.

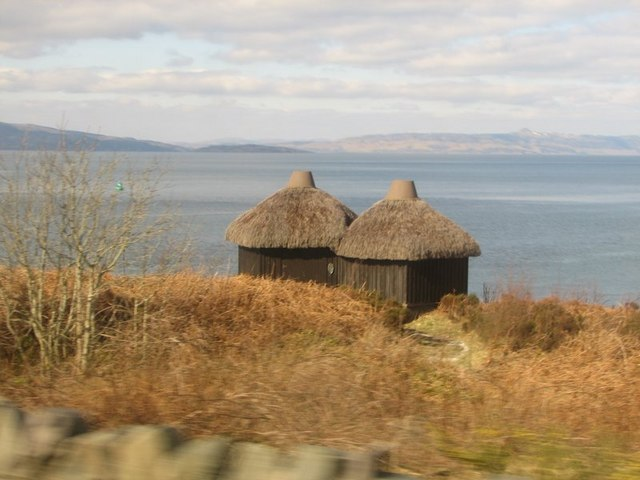
Otter and bird watching hides on Eilean Ban

In 2001 the island had a population of two as recorded by the census but in 2011 there were no "usual residents" living there.

== Kyleakin Lighthouse ==
Kyleakin Lighthouse is situated at the south-western end of Eilean Bàn. It was built by David and Thomas Stevenson in 1857, and is linked to a pair of keepers' houses. The lighthouse was automated and converted to use acetylene gas in 1960. Following the start of construction of the Skye Bridge, the lighthouse was decommissioned in 1993. It is a Category B listed building.

== See also ==
- List of lighthouses in Scotland
- List of Northern Lighthouse Board lighthouses
