= Skye Bridge =

Bridge connecting the Isle of Skye to the island of Eilean Bàn, Scotland

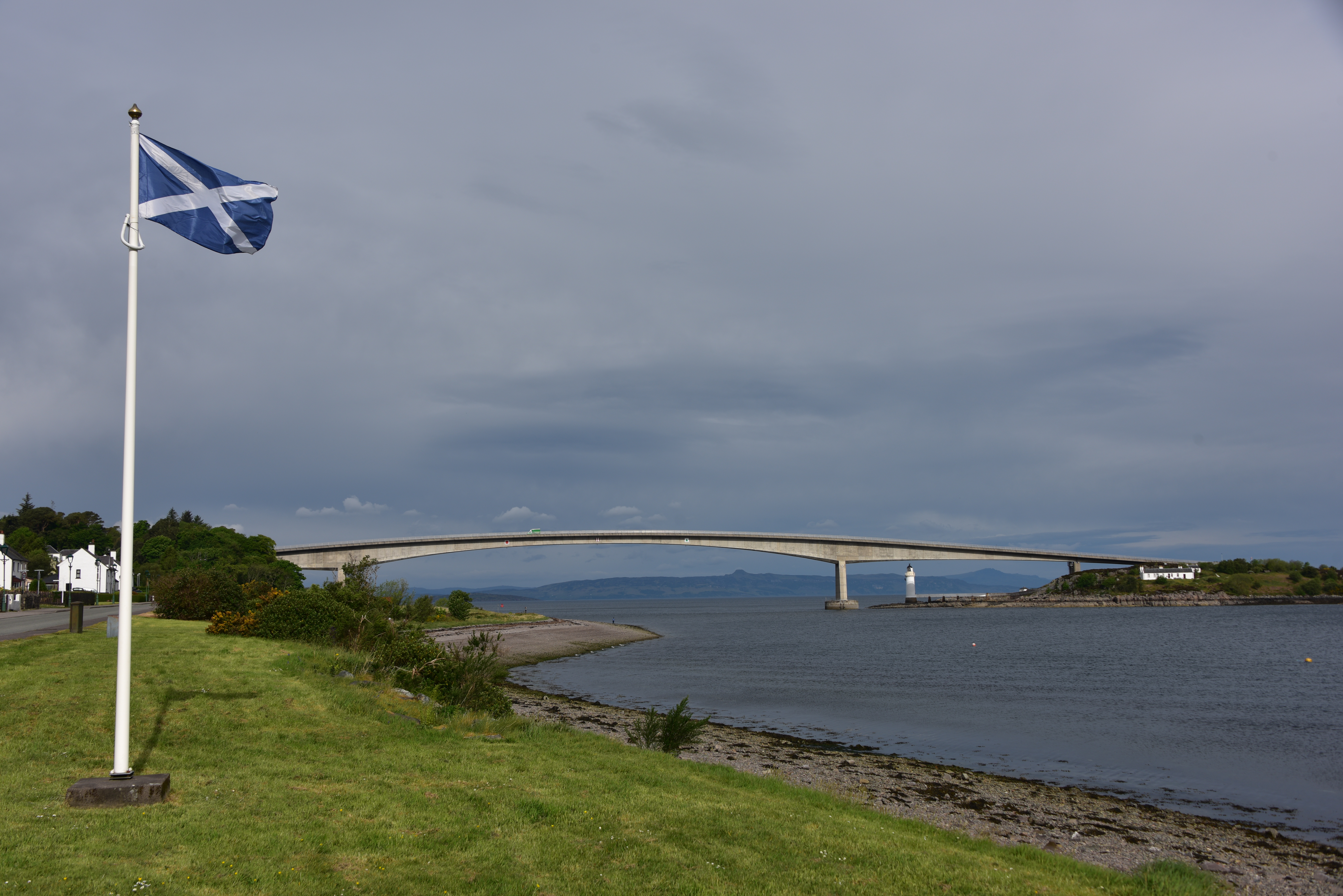
- Skye Bridge from Kyleakin
- Coordinates: 57.27958°N 5.73972°W
- Carries: A87 , Station Road
- Crosses: Loch Alsh

Characteristics
- Material: Concrete and steel

History
- Designer: Miller-Dywidag and Arup
- Construction start: 1992
- Opened: 16 October 1995
- Replaces: Caledonian MacBrayne Kyle of Lochalsh ferry

Location
- Interactive map of Skye Bridge

The Skye Bridge (Scottish Gaelic: Drochaid an Eilein Sgitheanaich) is a road bridge over Loch Alsh, Scotland, connecting the Isle of Skye to the island of Eilean Bàn. The name is also used for the whole Skye Crossing, which further connects Eilean Bàn to the mainland across the Carrich Viaduct. The crossing forms part of the A87.

Historically, the usual route from the mainland to Skye was the shortest sea crossing, with a length of around 500 metres (1,640 ft), across the sound between the villages of Kyle of Lochalsh on the mainland and Kyleakin on the island's east coast. A ferry service operated from around 1600, run by private operators and latterly by Caledonian MacBrayne.

The bridge cost £27 million to build.

== Background ==
Road and rail connections to Kyle of Lochalsh were constructed towards the end of the nineteenth century, and various parties proposed building a bridge to the island. Although the engineering task was well within the capability of the age (the crossing is shorter and shallower than that bridged by the Forth Bridge), the island's remoteness and small population meant that the cost could not be justified.

By 1971, the two 28-car ferries carried more than 300,000 vehicles. Increased prosperity in the islands and a healthy summertime tourist traffic led to traffic queuing for the ferries. This brought renewed calls for the construction of a road bridge.

== Design and construction ==
In 1989, Conservative junior minister Lord James Douglas-Hamilton announced a bidding round, within the government's PFI, and requested tenders to construct a toll bridge. A variety of locations and designs were proposed, and the contract was awarded to Miller-Dywidag, a consortium composed of Scottish construction company Miller Construction, German engineering company DYWIDAG-Systems International, and financial partner the Bank of America. The Miller-Dywidag proposal (designed in collaboration with civil engineering firm Arup) was for a single-span concrete arch, supported by two piers resting on caissons in the loch and using Eilean Bàn as a stepping-stone. The plan was accepted, and received support from local MP Charles Kennedy and the local council in the full knowledge that it would be on a high-toll basis for a limited period. Although the bridge itself was built with PFI, the approach roads were the responsibility of the Scottish Office, which paid £15 million for the roads and associated improvements, and to cover the costs associated with decommissioning the ferry. Construction began in 1992 led by project director John Henderson, and the bridge was opened by Secretary of State for Scotland Michael Forsyth on 16 October 1995. The ferry service ceased afterwards, and the bridge and the Mallaig–Armadale ferry were the only year-round connections to the mainland.

The two caissons supporting the main span were cast as hollow cylinders in the old Kishorn Dry Dock and floated to the site, where they were sunk onto the prepared loch bed. Kishorn Dock had been built for the oil industry, but only built the one rig: Ninian Central.

== Toll controversy ==
This was the first major capital project funded by the Private Finance Initiative, and in exchange for the contractors funding the bridge's construction themselves (rather than being paid to do so from the public exchequer) they were granted a licence to operate the bridge and charge travellers tolls. When the contract was first awarded, the partnership estimated it would cost around £15,000,000, but delays and design changes added significantly to the cost (to around £25,000,000) by the BBC's estimate).

The tolls charged by the bridge concessionaire, Skye Bridge Ltd., were particularly unpopular. By 2004, a round trip cost visitors £11.40, fourteen times the round trip price charged by the Forth Road Bridge, a crossing over twice the length. Protesters claimed the toll made it the most expensive road in Europe. While the Skye bridge was being built, several other, smaller bridges in the Hebrides were also being built or planned. These bridges were to connect smaller islands either to larger ones or to the mainland, and were toll-free. Skye residents came to believe that the Skye bridge should also be a public road and free of tolls.

The ferry operator, Caledonian MacBrayne, had made a annual profit of over £1,000,000 on the route, but observers from the BofA and later the National Audit Office noted that many locals were excused the ferry fee by ferry crew members, with much of the ferry's revenue coming from the heavy summertime tourist traffic. In the bridge's first year of operation, it recorded traffic of 612,000 vehicles, one-third more than the ferry's official numbers.

The campaign included mass protests and a prolonged non-payment campaign, and continued as long as did the tolls. A toll-collector interviewed by the BBC said that abuse of collectors by motorists had been commonplace. Numerous toll opponents were cited for refusing to pay the toll; around 500 were arrested and 130 subsequently convicted of non-payment. Among those charged was Clodagh Mackenzie, an elderly lady from whom some land needed for the bridge had been compulsorily purchased; the charges against her were subsequently dropped without explanation. Of those convicted, only the first, the SKAT Secretary Andy Anderson, received a (brief) prison term. Those charged with non-payment had to make the 140-mile (230-kilometre) round trip to Dingwall Sheriff Court, again crossing the bridge and where again many refused to pay; incurring a further criminal charge.

A Scottish campaigner and former Scottish Parliamentary candidate, Robbie the Pict, argued that the legal paperwork for the tolls was incomplete, and that consequently the tolls themselves were illegal. In particular he said that the "assignation statement", a licence to charge a toll, had never been given. Interviewed later by the BBC, Fiscal David Hingston in Dingwall denied this claim, but admitted that he himself had been denied access to many government documents on the case, on the grounds of commercial confidentiality. Hingston told the BBC "As a fiscal I was stuck with that evidence but as a private individual I found it stunning", leading to renewed calls that the convictions of the toll protesters should be quashed; to this the Crown Office reiterated that appeals on these grounds had already been rejected by the courts.

The bridge, and the toll protest, became a continuing political issue. Following the 1997 general election, the Labour-run Scottish Office introduced a scheme whereby tolls for locals were subsidised (the scheme cost a total of £7,000,000). Following the creation of the Scottish Parliament, the Scottish Labour Party joined in coalition with the Scottish Liberal Democrats, who had made the abolition of the Skye Bridge toll one of their priorities. With responsibility for Scotland's road network transferred from Westminster to the Scottish Executive, increased political pressure was placed on the toll's future. On 3 June 2004, Jim Wallace, the Enterprise Minister in the Scottish Executive, announced that he hoped the bridge would be bought out, and tolls abolished, by the end of 2004. In line with this, on 21 December 2004, Scottish Transport Minister Nicol Stephen announced that the Skye Bridge had been purchased for approximately £27,000,000 and toll collection immediately ceased. During the preceding decade £33,300,000 in tolls had been collected.

An Drochaid, an hour-long documentary in Scottish Gaelic, was made for BBC Alba documenting the battle to remove the tolls.

== See also ==
- List of bridges in Scotland
