= Robbie the Pict =

Scottish political activist

Robbie the Pict (born Brian Robertson, 1945) is a Scottish political activist, notably campaigning for the removal of tolls from the Skye Bridge, and former Scottish Parliamentary candidate for the Highlands and Islands. He is the founder of the "Pictish Free State" micronation.

== Career ==
=== Pictish Free State ===
Robertson first gained exposure as the leader of the micronation of the Pictish Free State, established in 1977 as a means of promoting awareness of the Pictish culture. He started the project with one acre of his own land on the Isle of Skye. Since then the Pictish Free State has grown to over 1,000 acres (400 hectares) through supporters donations. Robbie, under 'Pictish High Commission' auspices, has in the past been in conflict with HM Government over his use of Pictish diplomatic registration plates and non-compliance with UK laws.

=== Skye Bridge toll campaign ===
Robbie the Pict was a leading figure in the ultimately successful campaign to abolish the toll on the Skye Bridge, during which he argued that the legal paperwork for the tolls was incomplete, and that consequently the tolls themselves were illegal. The toll was finally abolished in 2004 after the Scottish government bought the bridge from its private owners. Robbie the Pict also appealed unsuccessfully to Prince Charles to help overturn the criminal convictions of those who had been prosecuted for refusing to pay the toll.

=== Asylum seeking ===
For a time in the early 1990s Robbie was in Tallinn, Estonia, where he sought political asylum. Robbie ultimately felt that he had been undermined by the influence of the MI6 British intelligence agency on the serving Estonian Minister of Foreign Affairs, Trivimi Velliste, to prevent Robbie becoming a cause célèbre by being officially granted political asylum. Robbie believed, and still believes, that Velliste's Soviet past made it possible for him to be compromised by foreign intelligence services.

=== Political candidacy ===
Robertson was a candidate for Member of the Scottish Parliament in 1999, standing as additional member for the Highlands and Islands. He received 1,151 votes, securing 0.57% of the vote.

=== Speed cameras challenges ===
In 2006 Robbie the Pict launched a campaign to have traffic light surveillance cameras declared illegal on the grounds that they have not been formally approved by Parliament. He was convicted in Nottingham of running through a red light. In April 2009, his appeal to the High Court in London was rejected.

In May 2009 he lost a test case in the Scottish Court of Criminal Appeal challenging the legality of speed cameras.
