= Duirinish railway station =

Railway station in Highland, Scotland

Duirinish Scottish Gaelic: Diùranais
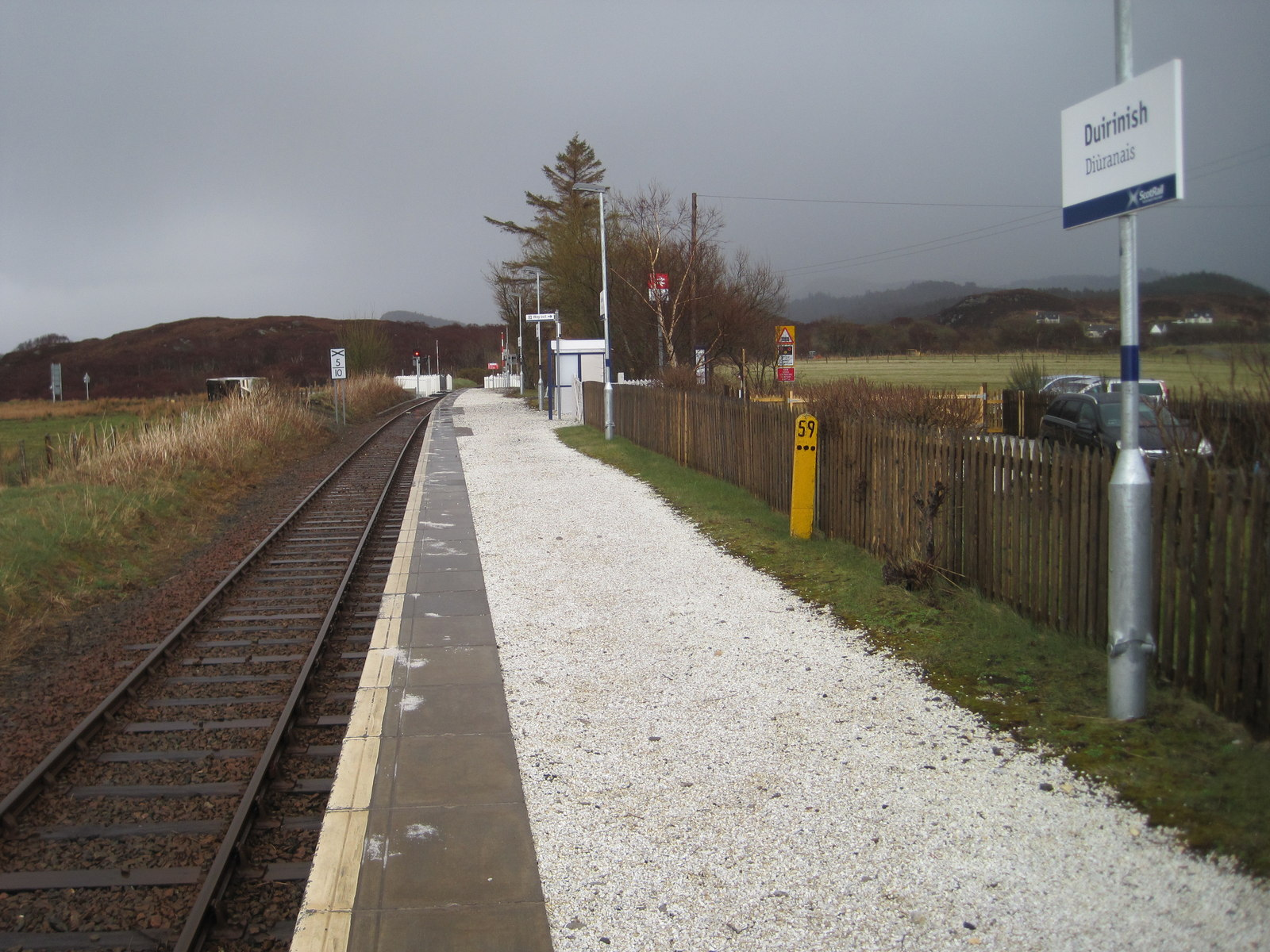

General information
- Location: Duirinish, Highland; Scotland
- Coordinates: 57.3199°N 5.6915°W
- Grid reference: NG777314
- Manager: ScotRail
- Platforms: 1

Other information
- Station code: DRN

History
- Original company: Dingwall and Skye Railway
- Pre-grouping: Highland Railway
- Post-grouping: LMS

Key dates
- 2 November 1897: Opened

Passengers
- 2021/22: ▲554
- 2022/23: ▲614
- 2023/24: ▲812
- 2024/25: ▲904
- 2025/26: ▼694
Location
Notes
- Passenger statistics from the Office of Rail and Road

Duirinish railway station is a remote railway station on the Kyle of Lochalsh Line near the settlement of Duirinish in the Highlands, northern Scotland. The station is approximately 2 miles (3 km) inland of Scotland's west coast, near Loch Lundie. The station is 59 miles 58 chains (96.1 km) from Dingwall, between Kyle of Lochalsh and Plockton. ScotRail, who manages the station, operates all services here.

== History ==
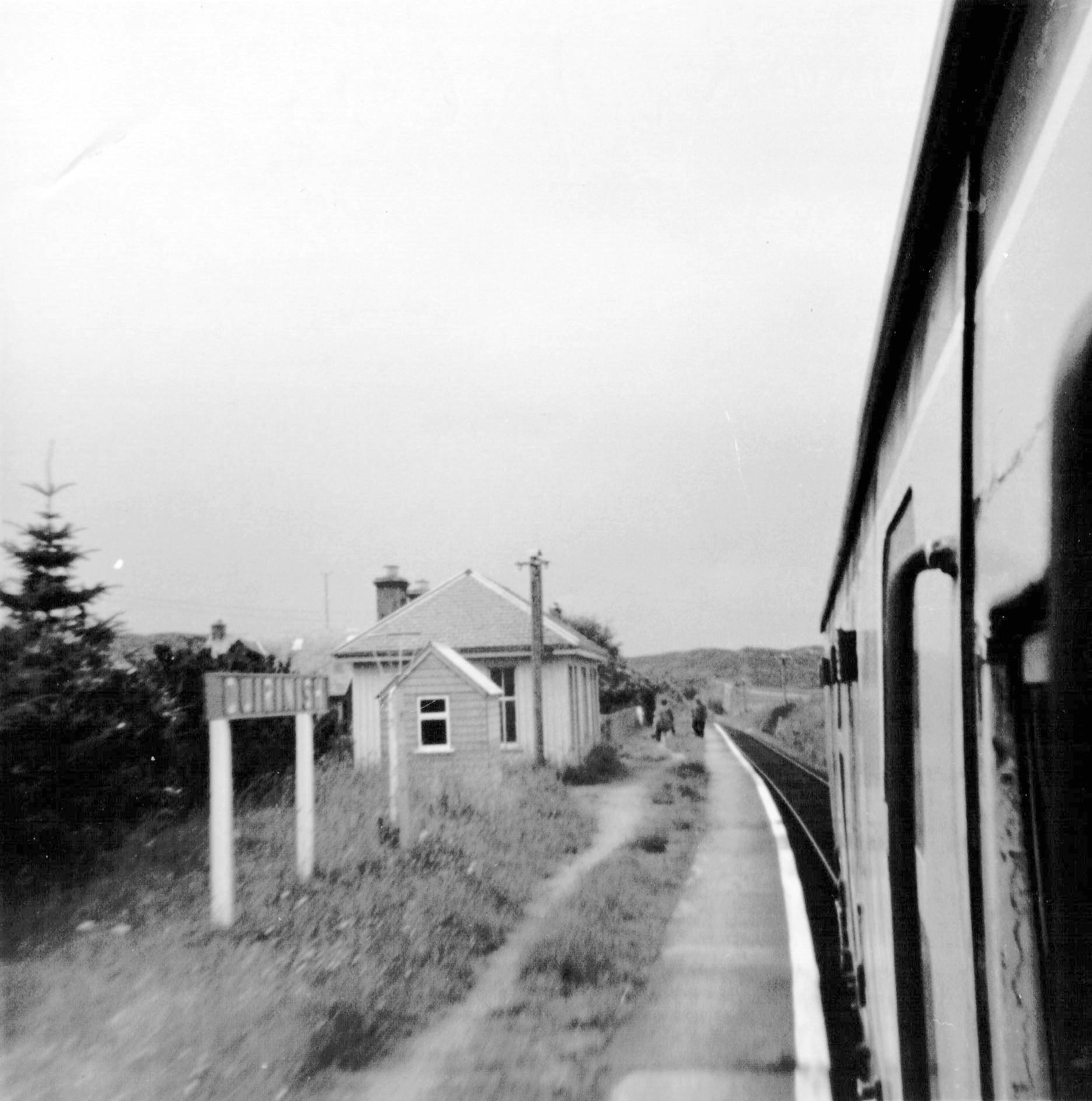
The station seen in 1970

The station was built by the Kyle of Lochalsh Extension (Highland Railway) between Stromeferry and Kyle of Lochalsh, opening on 2 November 1897.

== Facilities ==
Facilities here, like many other stations on the line, are very basic, consisting just of a shelter, a help point, some bike racks and a bench, although the station does have step-free access. As there are no facilities to purchase tickets, passengers must buy one in advance, or from the guard on the train.

== Passenger volume ==
Passenger Volume at Duirinish
	2004–05	2005–06	2006–07	2007–08	2008–09	2009–10	2010–11	2011–12	2012–13	2013–14	2014–15	2015–16	2016–17	2017–18	2018–19	2019–20	2020–21	2021–22	2022–23	2023–24	2024–25
Entries and exits	601	608	841	801	742	620	808	702	804	970	1,048	1,064	930	918	856	878	156	554	614	812	904

The statistics cover twelve month periods that start in April.

== Services ==
Four trains each way call (on request) on weekdays and Saturdays. On Sundays, there is only one train each way, plus a second from May to late September only.

Preceding station	National Rail	Following station
Plockton	ScotRail; Kyle of Lochalsh Line	Kyle of Lochalsh
	Historical railways	
Plockton; Line and station open	Highland Railway; Kyle of Lochalsh Extension	Kyle of Lochalsh; Line and station open

== Bibliography ==
- Awdry, Christopher (1990). Encyclopaedia of British Railway Companies. Sparkford: Patrick Stephens Ltd. ISBN 1-8526-0049-7. OCLC 19514063. CN 8983.
- Brailsford, Martyn, ed. (December 2017) [1987]. Railway Track Diagrams 1: Scotland & Isle of Man (6th ed.). Frome: Trackmaps. ISBN 978-0-9549866-9-8.
- Butt, R. V. J. (October 1995). The Directory of Railway Stations: details every public and private passenger station, halt, platform and stopping place, past and present (1st ed.). Sparkford: Patrick Stephens Ltd. ISBN 978-1-85260-508-7. OCLC 60251199. OL 11956311M.
- Jowett, Alan (March 1989). Jowett's Railway Atlas of Great Britain and Ireland: From Pre-Grouping to the Present Day (1st ed.). Sparkford: Patrick Stephens Ltd. ISBN 978-1-85260-086-0. OCLC 22311137.
- Jowett, Alan (2000). Jowett's Nationalised Railway Atlas (1st ed.). Penryn, Cornwall: Atlantic Transport Publishers. ISBN 978-0-906899-99-1. OCLC 228266687.
