= Balmacara Square =

Coordinates: 57.28394°N 5.62462°W

Balmacara Square: Scottish Gaelic: Ceàrnag Bhaile Mac Carra
- Location within the Highland council area
- OS grid reference: NG816272
- Council area: Highland
- Country: Scotland
- Sovereign state: United Kingdom
- Postcode district: IV40 8
- Police: Scotland
- Fire: Scottish
- Ambulance: Scottish

Balmacara Square (Scottish Gaelic: Ceàrnag Bhaile Mac Carra) is a small village, close to Balmacara, in Lochalsh, Scottish Highlands and is in the council area of Highland.

Balmacara Square was traditionally the centre of the Balmacara Estate, some 6,400 acres (26 km^{2}) in size, with a number of crofts, farmhouses and a steading being built, until it gradually developed to over 40 households. In 1946, the village was bequeathed to the National Trust for Scotland. It recently underwent extensive renovation which is still continuing.
