= Balmacara =

Coordinates: 57.2929°N 5.6429°W

Balmacara: Scottish Gaelic: Baile Mac Ara
- Location within the Ross and Cromarty area
- OS grid reference: NG816272
- Council area: Highland
- Country: Scotland
- Sovereign state: United Kingdom
- Postcode district: IV40 8
- Police: Scotland
- Fire: Scottish
- Ambulance: Scottish
- UK Parliament: Ross, Skye and Lochaber
- Scottish Parliament: Skye, Lochaber and Badenoch

Balmacara (Scottish Gaelic: Baile Mac Ara) is a scattered village on the north shore of Loch Alsh near Kyle of Lochalsh, Ross-shire, Highland and is in the Scottish council area of the Highland, Scotland.

In 1946, Lady Hamilton, bequeathed the 2,750-hectare (6,800-acre) Balmacara crofting estate to the people of Scotland, by donating it to the National Trust for Scotland. In 1954 the nearby Lochalsh House was conveyed to the Trust. The Balmacara Estate Visitor Centre is located in the centre of Balmacara.

The Shinty club, Kinlochshiel play in the hamlet.

The community of Balmacara lies on the edge of Balmacara Bay. Within the wider area of Balmacara and Balmacara Square lies the Balmacara Cemetery, the Lochalsh War Memorial, a number of hotels, B&Bs, and a local Spar shop.

Children from the area attend the primary school at Auctertyre, and then Plockton High School.
