= Loch Lundie =

Freshwater loch in Glen Garry, Scotland

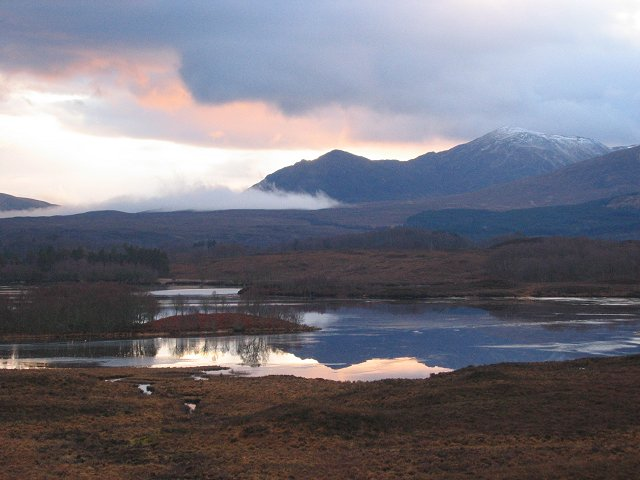
- Loch Lundie

- Location within Highland
- Location: Highland, Scotland
- Coordinates: 57.091500°N 4.814000°W
- Type: freshwater loch
- Primary inflows: Allt Lundie
- Primary outflows: Aldernaig Burn
- Basin countries: Scotland
- Max. length: 0.75 mi (1.21 km)
- Max. width: 0.33 mi (0.53 km)
- Surface area: 44.1 ha (109 acres)
- Average depth: 40 ft (12 m)
- Max. depth: 54 ft (16 m)
- Water volume: 78,000,000 ft^{3} (2,200,000 m^{3})
- Shore length^{1}: 5.5 km (3.4 mi)
- Surface elevation: 137 m (449 ft)
- Islands: 2
- ^{1} Shore length is not a well-defined measure.

Loch Lundie is a small, lowland freshwater loch in Glen Garry, about 1.5 miles (2.4 km) north-west of Invergarry in the Scottish Highlands. The loch is irregular in shape with a perimeter of 0.9 km (0.56 mi). It is approximately 0.75 mi (1.21 km) long, has an average depth of 40 ft (12 m) and is 54 ft (16 m) at its deepest. The loch was surveyed in 1903 by Sir John Murray and James Murray as part of the Bathymetrical Survey of Fresh-Water Lochs of Scotland 1897-1909.
