= Duirinish, Lochalsh =

Coordinates: 57.31457°N 5.67435°W

Duirinish: Scottish Gaelic: Diùirinis
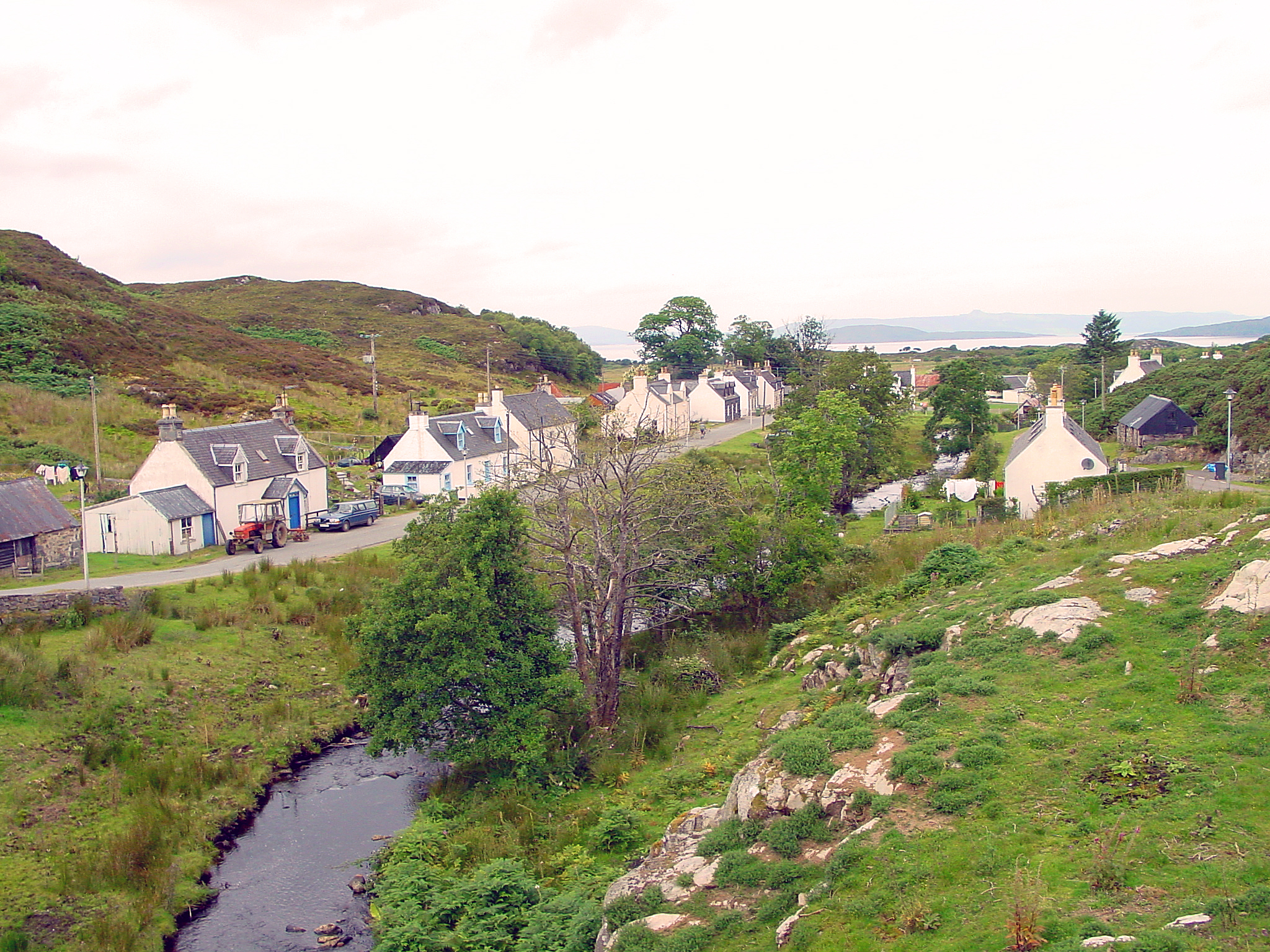
- Duirinish with the Allt Dhuirinish river.

- Location within the Ross and Cromarty area
- OS grid reference: NG788308
- Council area: Highland
- Country: Scotland
- Sovereign state: United Kingdom
- Post town: Kyle
- Postcode district: IV40 8
- Police: Scotland
- Fire: Scottish
- Ambulance: Scottish

Duirinish (Scottish Gaelic: Diùirinis) is a hamlet in Lochalsh near Plockton in Ross-shire, Scottish Highlands and is in the Scottish council area of Highland.

The hamlet is largely formed around the Allt Dhiuirnis river, which flows westward into the Inner Sound. Nearby is the hamlet of Drumbuie.

Duirinish is served by the Duirinish railway station which is located 1/2 mile (800 m) to the west. The addition of this railway service in 1897 brought a boost to the local economy.

In 1891, the population was over 107, and had three butchers, two grocery stores, an undertaker and a shirtmaker. However, after the First World War, it saw rapid decline.

Within the community lies a stone bridge built by Thomas Telford in 1826. It is now grade C listed.
