= Auchtertyre =

Coordinates: 57.286°N 5.585°W

Auchtertyre: Scottish Gaelic: Uachdar Thìre
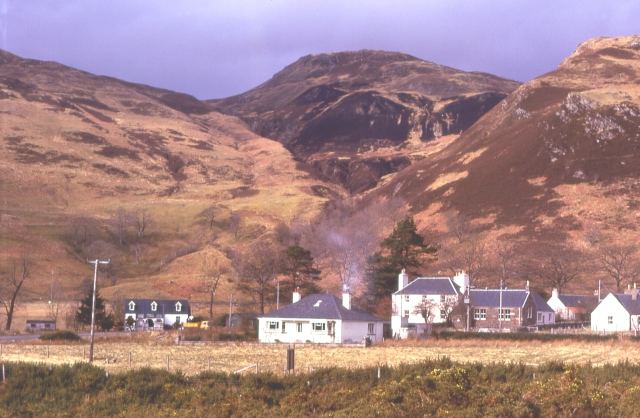
- Auchtertyre

- Location within the Ross and Cromarty area
- OS grid reference: NG839274
- Council area: Highland
- Lieutenancy area: Ross and Cromarty
- Country: Scotland
- Sovereign state: United Kingdom
- Post town: Kyle of Lochalsh
- Postcode district: IV40 8
- Dialling code: 01599
- Police: Scotland
- Fire: Scottish
- Ambulance: Scottish
- UK Parliament: Ross, Skye and Lochaber
- Scottish Parliament: Skye, Lochaber and Badenoch

Auchtertyre (Scottish Gaelic: Uachdar Thìre, "Upper Land") is a village, lying half a mile from the north shore of Loch Alsh near Kyle of Lochalsh, in the Highlands and in the Scottish council area of the Highland Council. Nearby Auchtertyre Hill, to the north of the village, has a height of 452 metres (1,483 ft).

Auchtertyre Primary School serves the surrounding area, including Achmore, Balmacara and Dornie.
