= Ardelve =

Coordinates: 57.27°N 05.55°W

Ardelve: Scottish Gaelic: Àird Eilbh
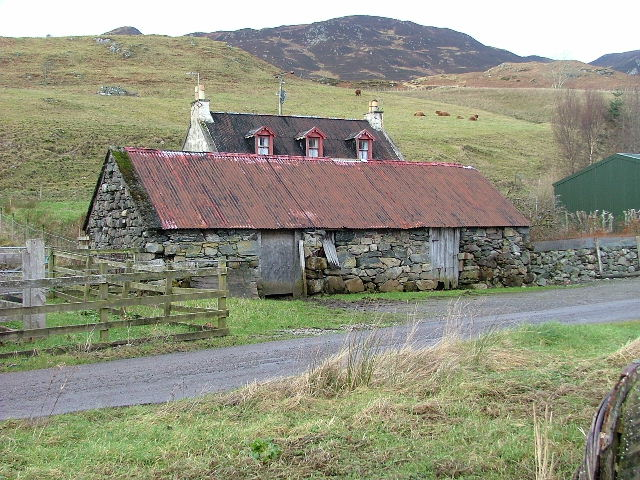
- A croft in Upper Ardelve

- Location within the Highland council area
- Population: 157
- OS grid reference: NG8626
- Council area: Highland
- Country: Scotland
- Sovereign state: United Kingdom
- Postcode district: IV
- Dialling code: 01599555
- Police: Scotland
- Fire: Scottish
- Ambulance: Scottish
- UK Parliament: Ross, Skye and Lochaber
- Scottish Parliament: Skye, Lochaber and Badenoch

Ardelve (Scottish Gaelic: Àird Eilbh) is a village in Highland, Scotland, on Loch Alsh. It overlooks the Eilean Donan Castle, which is in Dornie, also on Loch Alsh, to the east of Skye. A caravan park, several guest houses, a bakery, and pizzeria are located within Ardelve.

Willie McRae (18 May 1923 – 7 April 1985) was a Scottish lawyer, orator, naval officer, politician and anti-nuclear campaigner. His ancestors lived here and he used the family croft as a holiday home. He died in suspicious circumstances while en route here.

== Geography ==
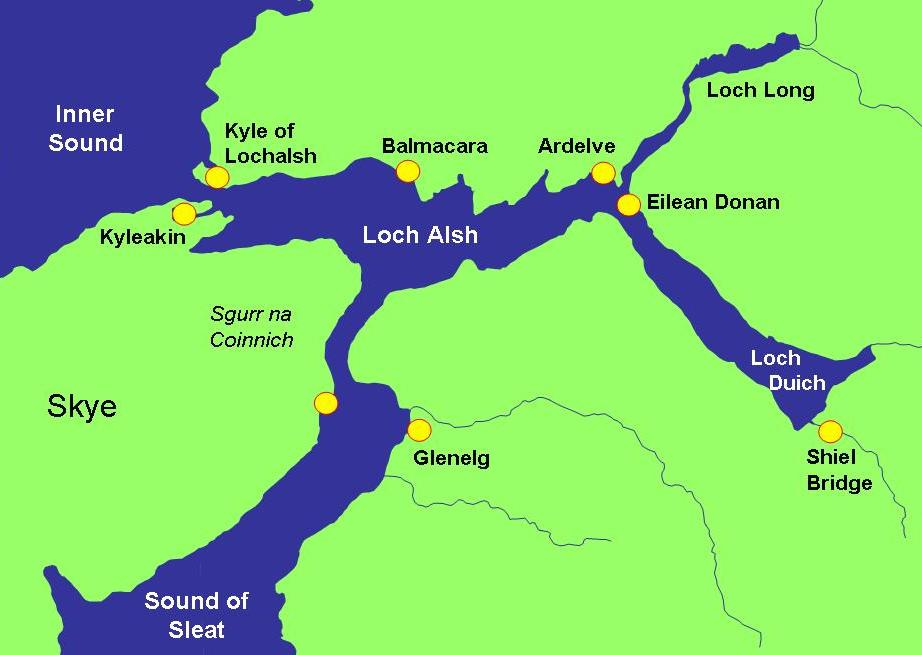
Map of Loch Alsh with Ardelve at start of the head reach

The road from Invergarry to Invermoriston, today the A87 road, passes through the village and once terminated at the ferry station (today the road crosses the water by a bridge). It connects the village to Auchtertyre in the west. In 1882 it had a post office and a school. The village is divided into Upper and Lower Ardelve. Important landmarks on the road to Ardelve are the Loch Cluanie, the Seven Sisters of Kintail, the Kintail Lodge Hotel and Loch Duich and Balmacara Gardens of the National Trust for Scotland (4 miles to the west of the village). A forest area with historic linkage to Bonnie Prince Charlie's hiding in 1746, is the Glen Shiel with Glen Affric Forest to the north of the village.

== Avifauna ==
During bird sighting tours to the Loch Alsh and the surrounding areas, sparrowhawk, whimbrel, house martin, sedge warbler and grebes have been sighted at Ardelve. Grebes were also sighted at Ardelve Point. Little grebes have also been seen all along the coast from Ardelve to Balmacara Bay. It is also inferred that little grebes seen at Ardelve in July or August could be migrants from the continent or Scandinavia.

== Governance ==
Ardelve is in the Ross, Skye and Lochaber UK Parliament constituency and the Ross, Skye and Inverness West Scottish Parliament constituency. It is in the Wester Ross, Strathpeffer and Lochalsh ward of the Highland council area, represented by four councillors.

== Attractions ==
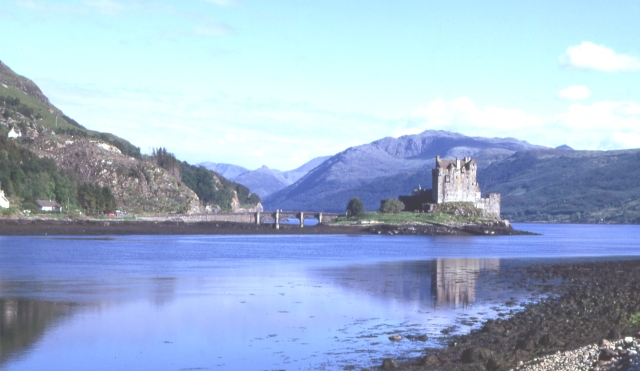
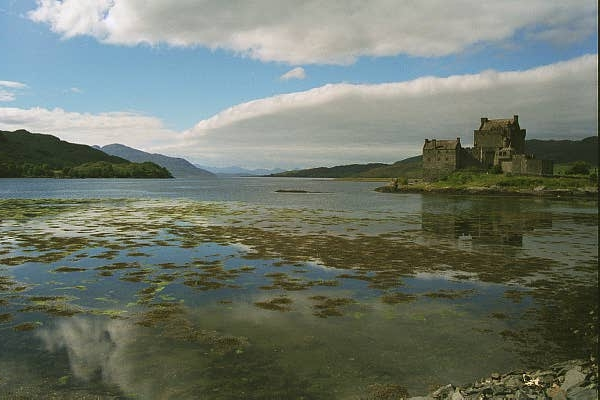
Left: Eilean Donan Castle from Ardelve Point. A stronghold of the Mackenzies of Kintail. Right: Eilean Donan Castle. Ardelve Point is the headland to the left of the picture.

The attractions in the precincts of Ardelve are the Ardelve Point that offers scenic views across to Eilean Donan Castle, about 400 metres off the point, Local Church and the bridge across the Loch.
