= Loch Alsh =

Sea inlet of Scotland

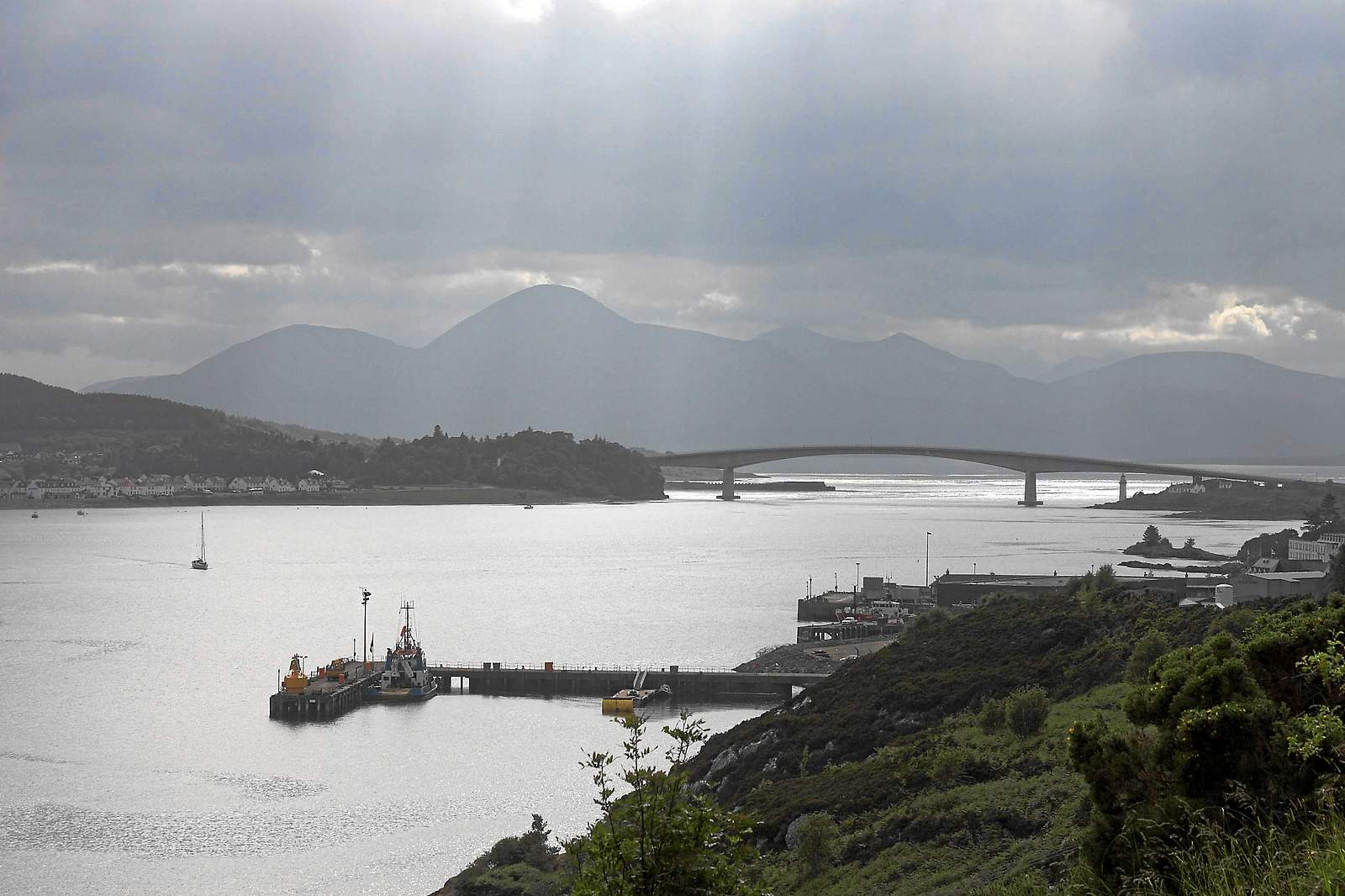
- The Kyle (narrows) of Loch Alsh and the Skye Bridge

- Location within Scotland
- Location: Wester Ross, Highland Region, Scotland
- Coordinates: 57.27°N 5.66°W
- Lake type: Sea loch
- Primary inflows: Loch Long (Highlands), Loch Duich
- Primary outflows: Inner Sound, Scotland
- Basin countries: Scotland
- Max. length: 12 km (7.5 mi)
- Max. width: 2.5 km (1.6 mi)
- Surface elevation: 0 m (0 ft)
- Settlements: Kyle of Lochalsh, Ardelve, Balmacara

Loch Alsh (Scottish Gaelic: Loch Aillse, "Loch of Aillse") is a sea inlet between the isle of Skye in the Inner Hebrides and the Northwest Highlands of Scotland. The name is also used to describe the surrounding country and the feudal holdings around the loch. The area is rich in history, and is increasingly popular with tourists.

The hilly country around Loch Alsh has a temperate, well-watered climate. There is some pasture and woodland, but much of the area is moorland. The rocks are ancient Precambrian Gneiss, some of the oldest in the world, much eroded.

== Location ==
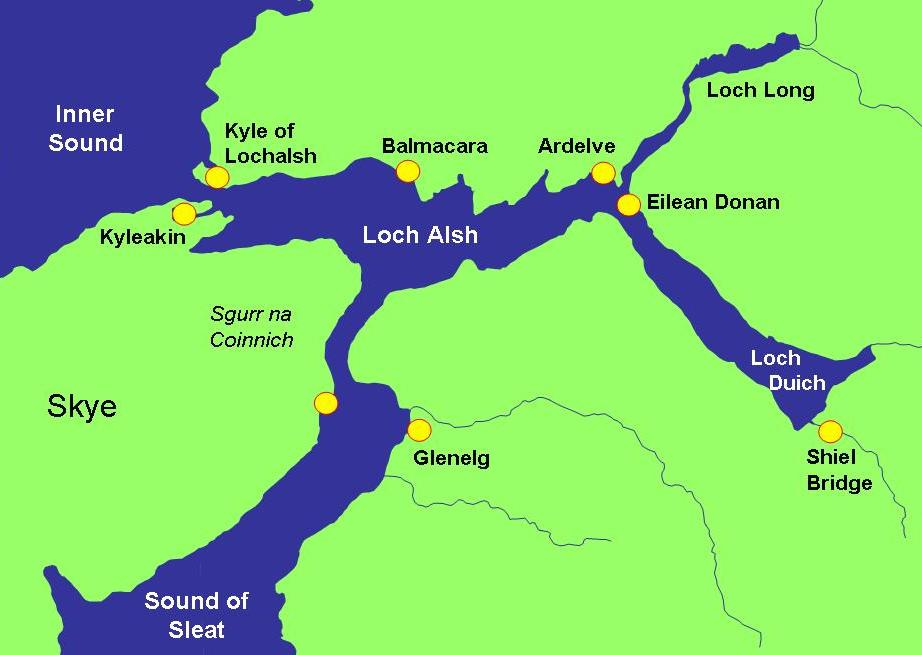
Sketch map of area

The loch runs inland about 12 kilometres (7 1/2 miles) from Kyle of Lochalsh to Ardelve. From there Loch Duich continues southeast another 10 km (6 mi) to Shiel Bridge while Loch Long runs deeper into the mountains to the northeast. A narrow strait from the south of Loch Alsh leads to the Sound of Sleat that separates the Isle of Skye from the mainland. The loch is overlooked by Sgurr na Coinnich, which rises to 739 metres (2,425 ft) on Skye. The mainland hills to the north reach 452 m (1,483 ft) at the summit of Auchtertyre Hill and 344 m (1,129 ft) on Sgurr Mor but are generally lower and slope gradually down to the west.

The ancient stronghold of Inverness is 50 mi (80 km) directly to the east over the Northwest Highlands.

The climate is temperate. Annual rainfall is around 2,300 mm (91 in) per year and temperatures range from 0–7 °C (32–45 °F) in January to 10–18 °C (50–64 °F) in July and August. On any given day of the year rain is more likely than not. Much of the countryside is moorland or pasture but there are lowland areas of deciduous forest with native birchwoods and oakwoods and some conifer plantations. At one time the forest would have been more extensive, but the early inhabitants converted parts of it to crofts (small farms) and when the Highland Clearances destroyed the crofts the land was kept as pasture.

The loch witnessed the last invasion on the UK by Spanish forces in 1719.

== Geology ==
The loch lies between hills just east of the Moine Thrust Belt, an unusual geological structure that runs from the Sleat peninsula in Skye on a northeast diagonal to Loch Eriboll on the north coast of Scotland. In this area, geologists found in 1907 that younger rocks from the west lay below the older rocks of the east, a discovery that helped lead to the modern theory of mountain building. The Lewisian gneisses around Loch Alsh were formed in the Precambrian period, about 2,800 million years ago, while the volcanic rocks, gabbro and granite that make up most of Skye, and that in some places lie under the older gneisses, are just 55 million years old. The ancient metamorphic rocks around Loch Alsh have been heavily eroded over the years, most recently by a series of ice ages.

== Fauna ==
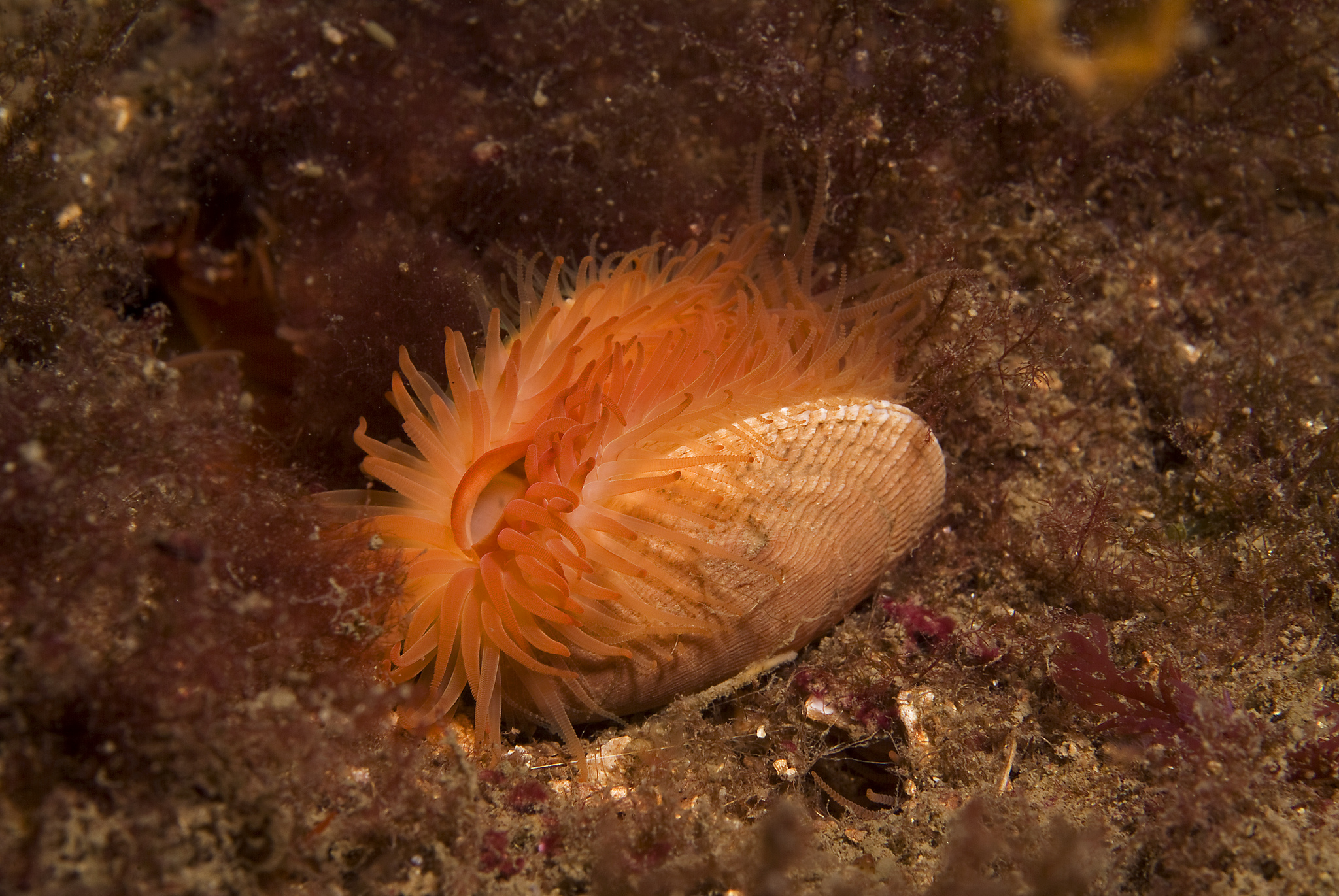
A flame shell taken in Scotland

In 2012, a large colony of flame shells was discovered in the loch following a Marine Scotland commissioned survey, carried out by Heriot-Watt University. The reef is thought to consist of over 100 million flame shells covering 75 hectares (190 acres), making it the largest known reef of its kind in the UK. In order to protect the flame shell beds the loch has since 2014 formed part of a Nature Conservation Marine Protected Area (NCMPA).
