= Kyle of Lochalsh =

Village in Highland, Scotland

Coordinates: 57.28°N 5.72°W

Kyle of Lochalsh: Scottish Gaelic: Caol Loch Aillse
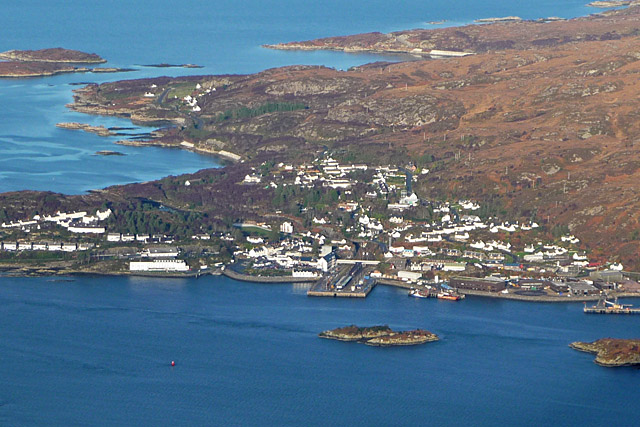

- Location within the Ross and Cromarty area
- Population: 590 (2020)
- Language: English; Scottish Gaelic
- OS grid reference: NG765275
  - Edinburgh: 133 mi (214 km)
  - London: 458 mi (737 km)
- Council area: Highland
- Lieutenancy area: Ross and Cromarty
- Country: Scotland
- Sovereign state: United Kingdom
- Post town: Kyle
- Postcode district: IV40
- Dialling code: 01599
- Police: Scotland
- Fire: Scottish
- Ambulance: Scottish
- UK Parliament: Inverness, Skye and West Ross-shire
- Scottish Parliament: Skye, Lochaber and Badenoch
- Website: http://www.lochalsh.com

Kyle of Lochalsh (Scottish Gaelic: Caol Loch Aillse [kɯːl̪ˠ l̪ˠɔx ˈaiʎʃə], "strait of the foaming loch") is a village in the historic county of Ross & Cromarty on the northwest coast of Scotland, located around 55 miles (90 km) west-southwest of Inverness. It is located on the Lochalsh peninsula, at the entrance to Loch Alsh, opposite the village of Kyleakin on the Isle of Skye. A ferry used to connect the two villages until it was replaced by the Skye Bridge, about a mile (2 km) to the west, in 1995.

== Geography ==
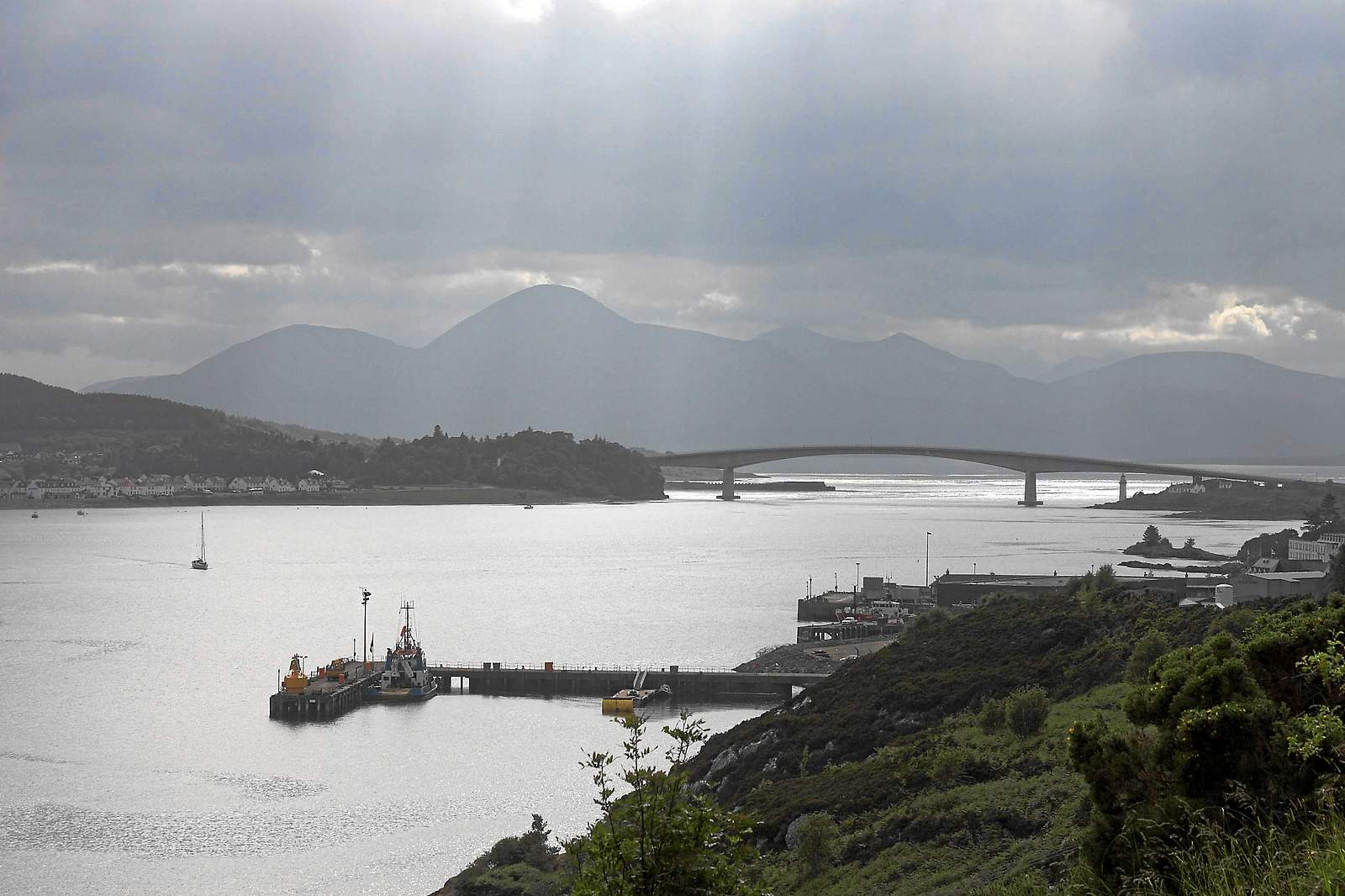
Kyle of Lochalsh

The village is the transport and shopping centre for the area as well as having a harbour and marina with pontoons for maritime visitors. The Plock offers a local woodland hike and viewpoint over the peninsula. The Plock was formerly home to a golf course. It is owned by the Kyle of Lochalsh Community Trust, who also own the adjacent building which was formerly the toll building for the Skye Bridge. The surrounding scenery and wildlife are regarded as attractions of the village, as is the slow pace of life. Crofting as well as more recent crofting pursuits like salmon farming are some of the activities taking place in Kyle of Lochalsh.

A land-based control centre of the Royal Naval BUTEC submarine range is based in Kyle of Lochalsh.

Kyle of Lochalsh lies almost precisely 500 miles (800 kilometres) due north of Land's End in Cornwall.

Kyle of Lochalsh is the mainland connecting point of the Skye Bridge, with Kyleakin on the Isle of Skye being at the opposite side of the bridge.

== History ==
A public hall in the centre of the village was completed in 1932.

Kyle of Lochalsh was the departure point, on New Year's Eve 1918, of the HMY Iolaire, which was bringing home soldiers returning from World War I to the Outer Hebrides. It sank close to its destination of Stornoway resulting in more than 200 deaths.

The Annual Reports of the Fishery Board for Scotland provide an insight into the state of fishing in Loch Alsh in the years before the First World War.

Fishery Statistics

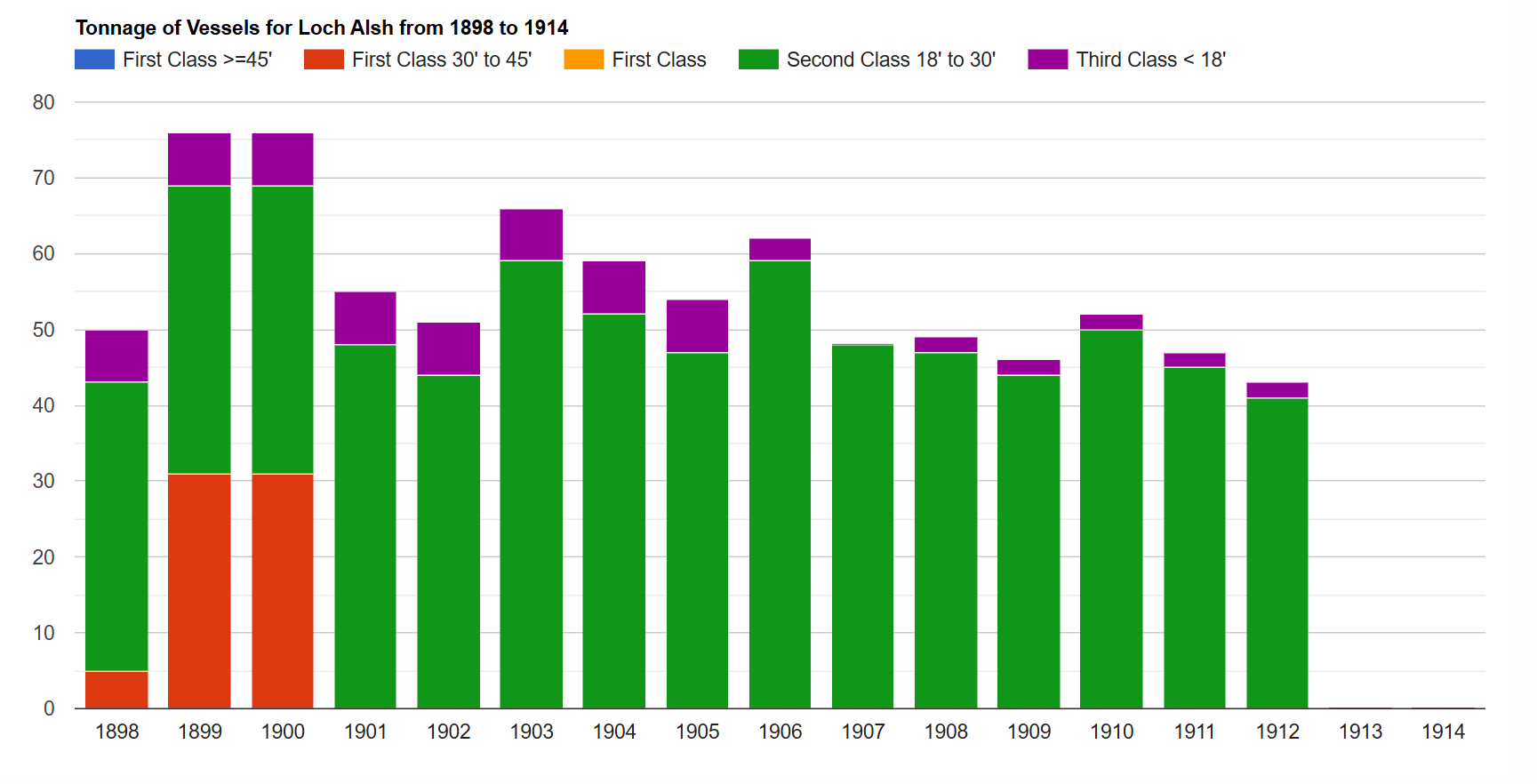
Tonnage of vessels

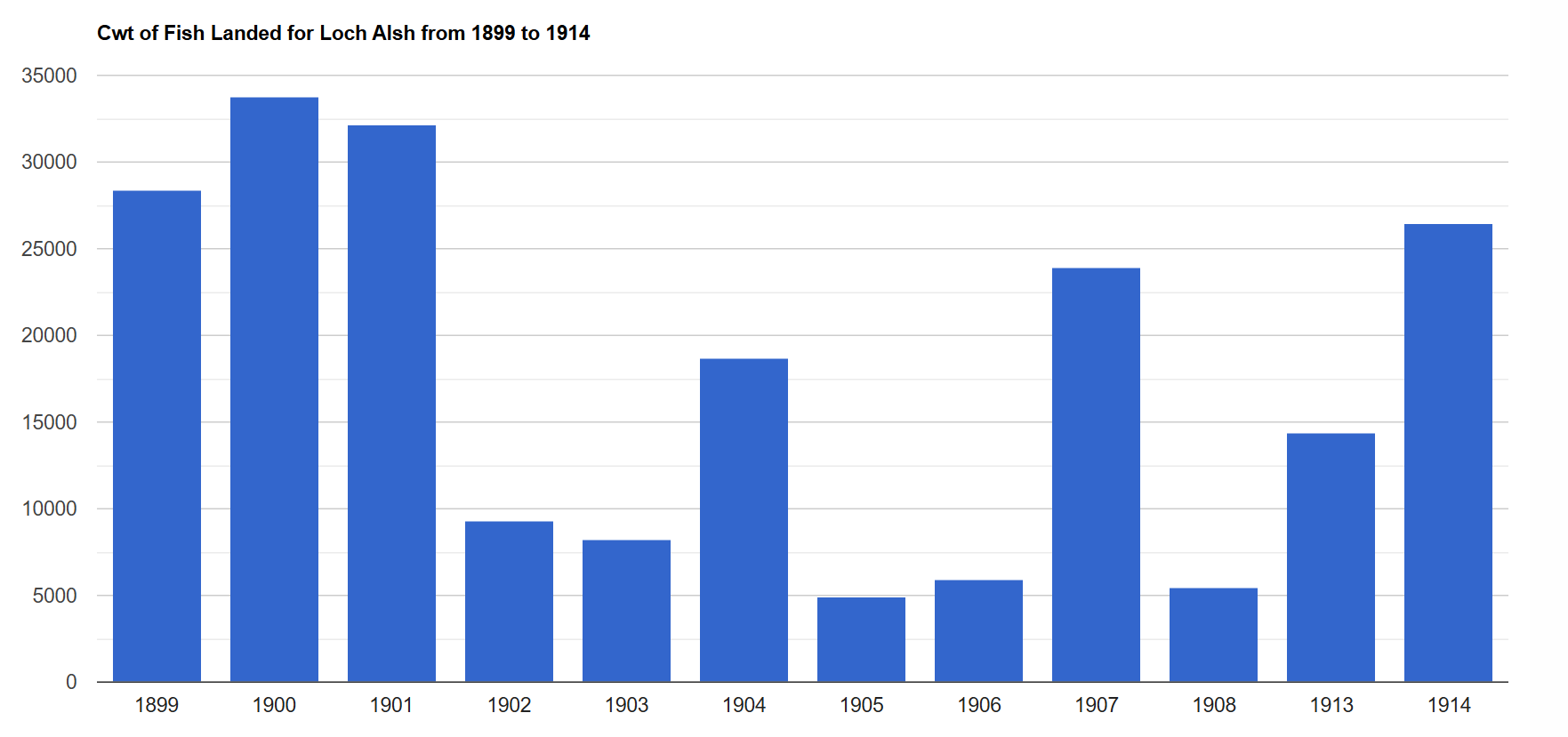
Cwt of fish landed

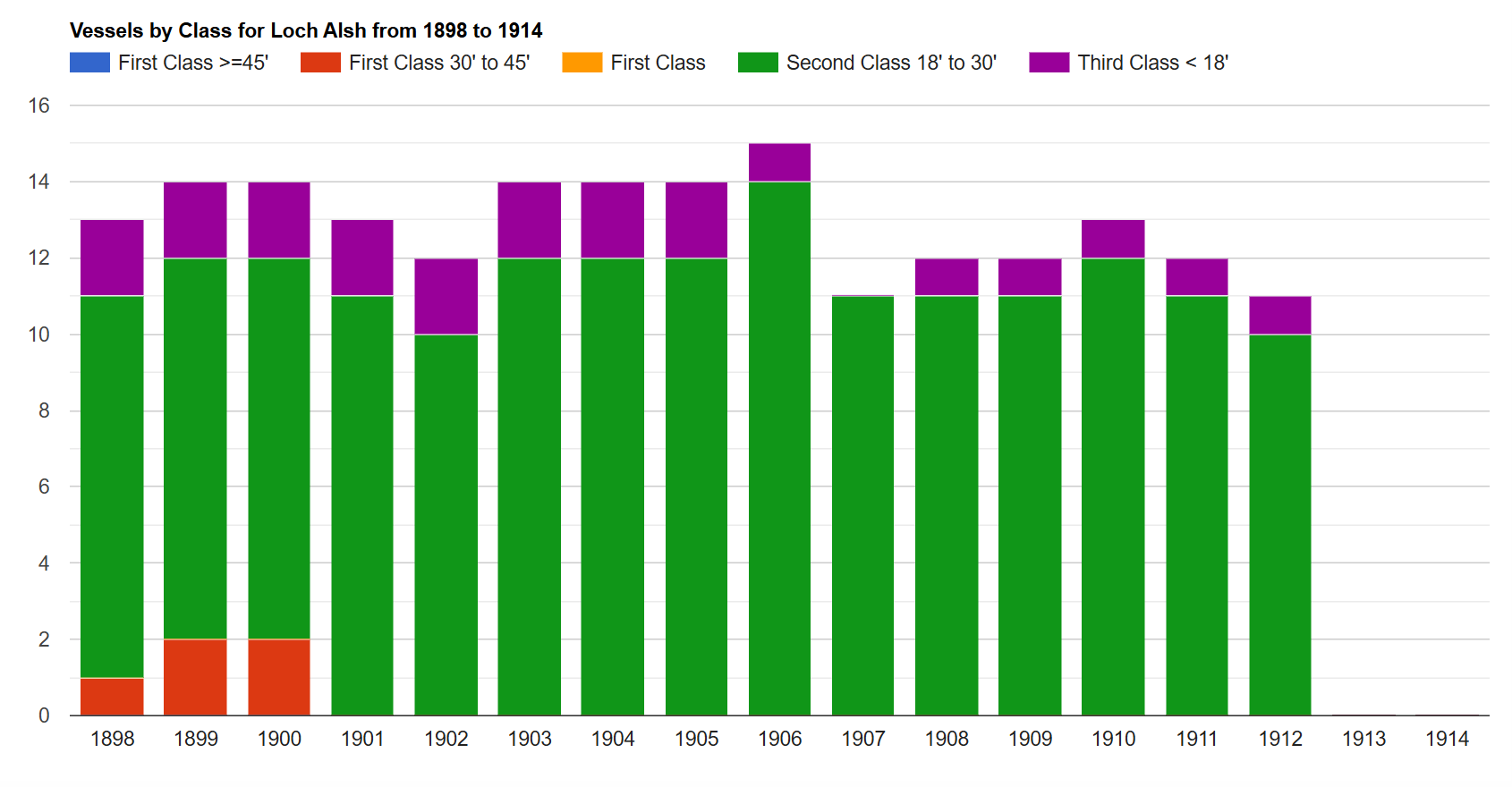
Vessels by class

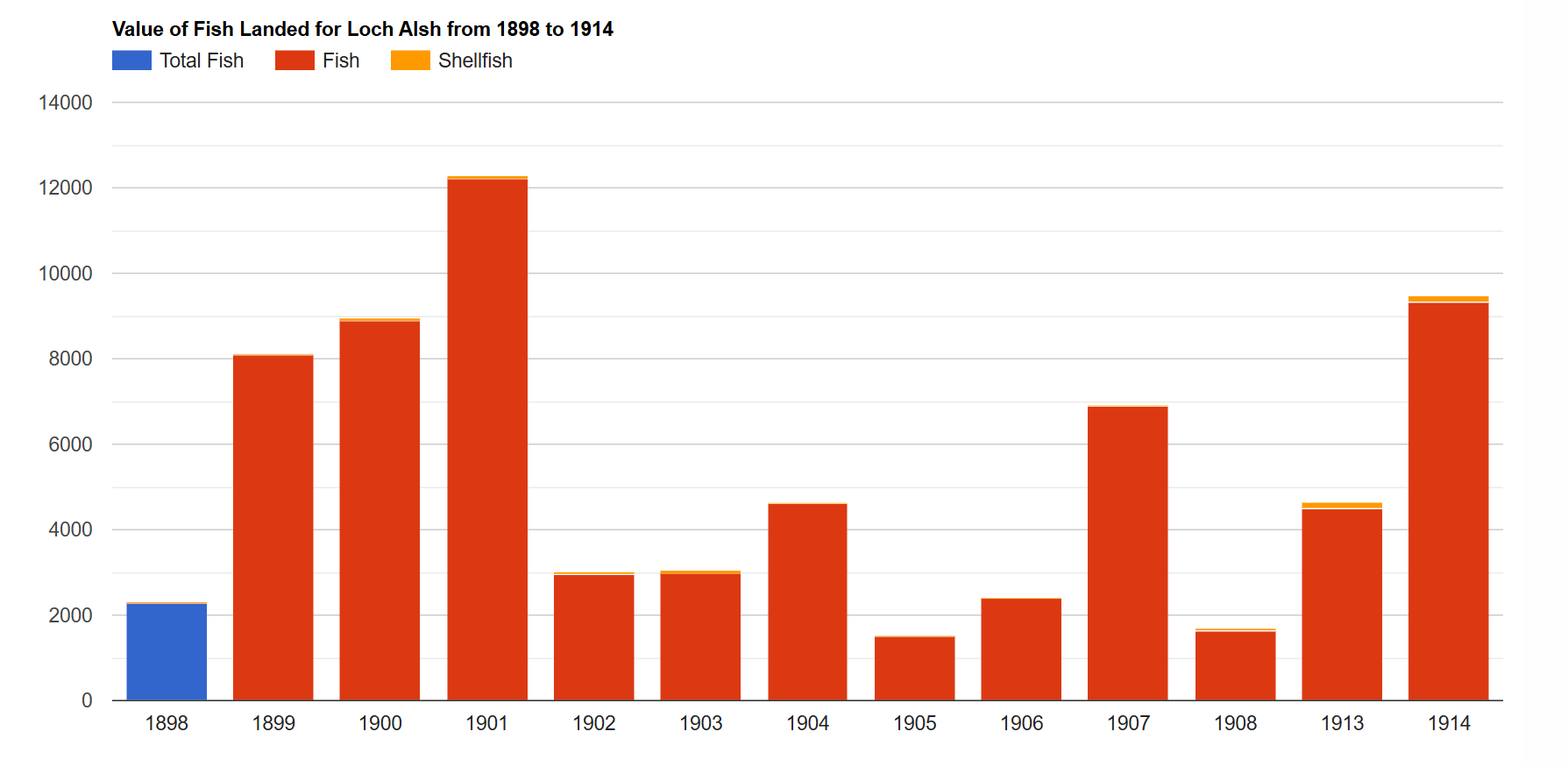
Value (£) of fish landed

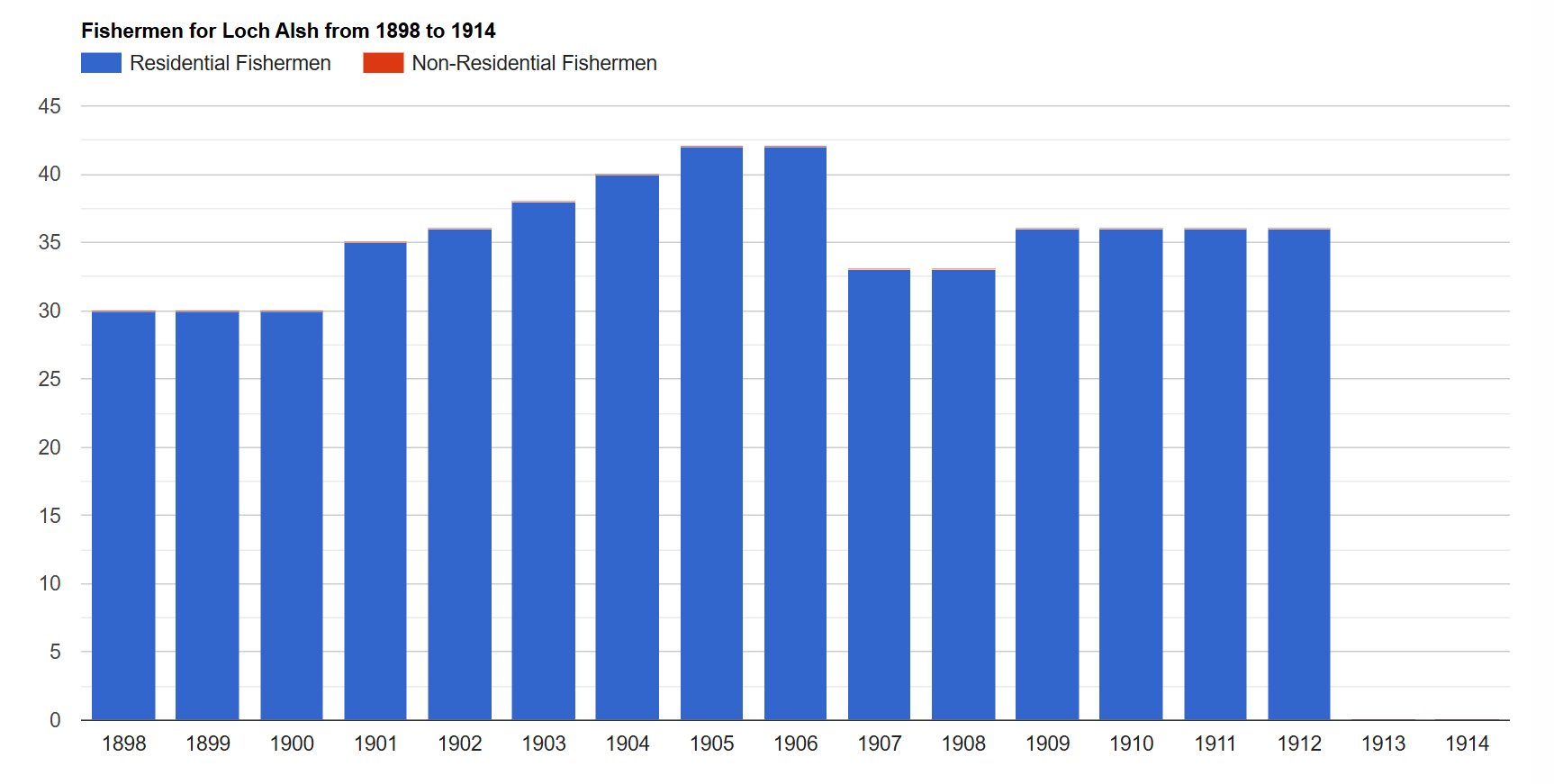
Fishermen

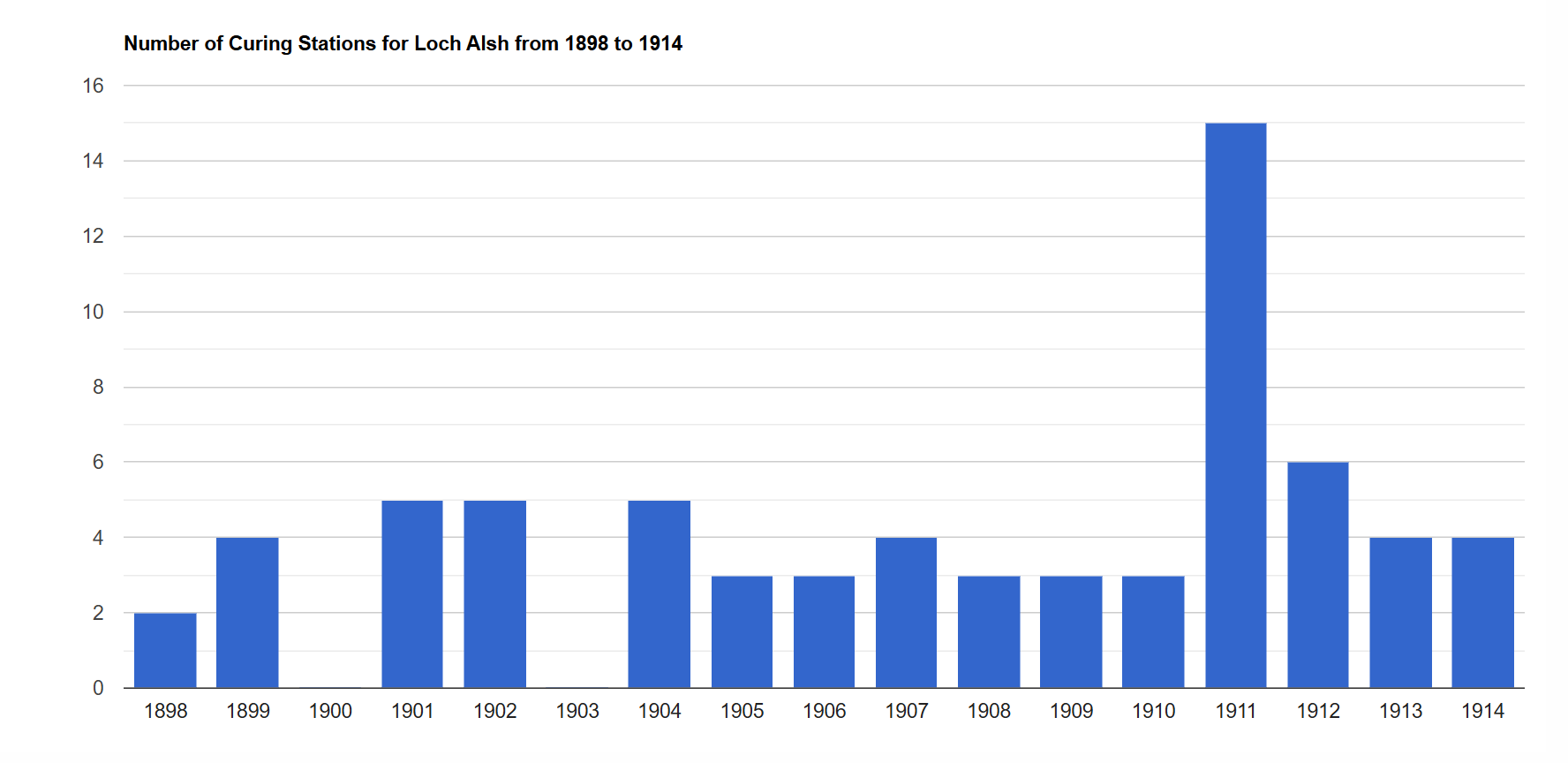
Placeholder- no curing stations

The report for 1902 states that "the quantity and value of the fish landed is less than one third of that landed in 1901. This is accounted for partly by the failure of the herring fishing in the lochs, and also owing to the boats running with their fish to Mallaig instead of Kyle , as in former years." The railway to Mallaig opened in 1901 .

In 1973, the ferry service which operated from Kyle of Lochalsh to Stornoway was discontinued, with services transferred to Ullapool instead.

During the 1990s, residents and workers in the area of Kyle of Lochalsh joined together with residents and workers on the Isle of Skye to form the SKAT (Skye and Kyle Against Tolls) anti-toll group movement, to protest against the Skye bridge tolls, which at the time were the highest in the country (£5 per crossing). The protestors were successful in having tolls abolished on the Skye Bridge.

== Transport ==
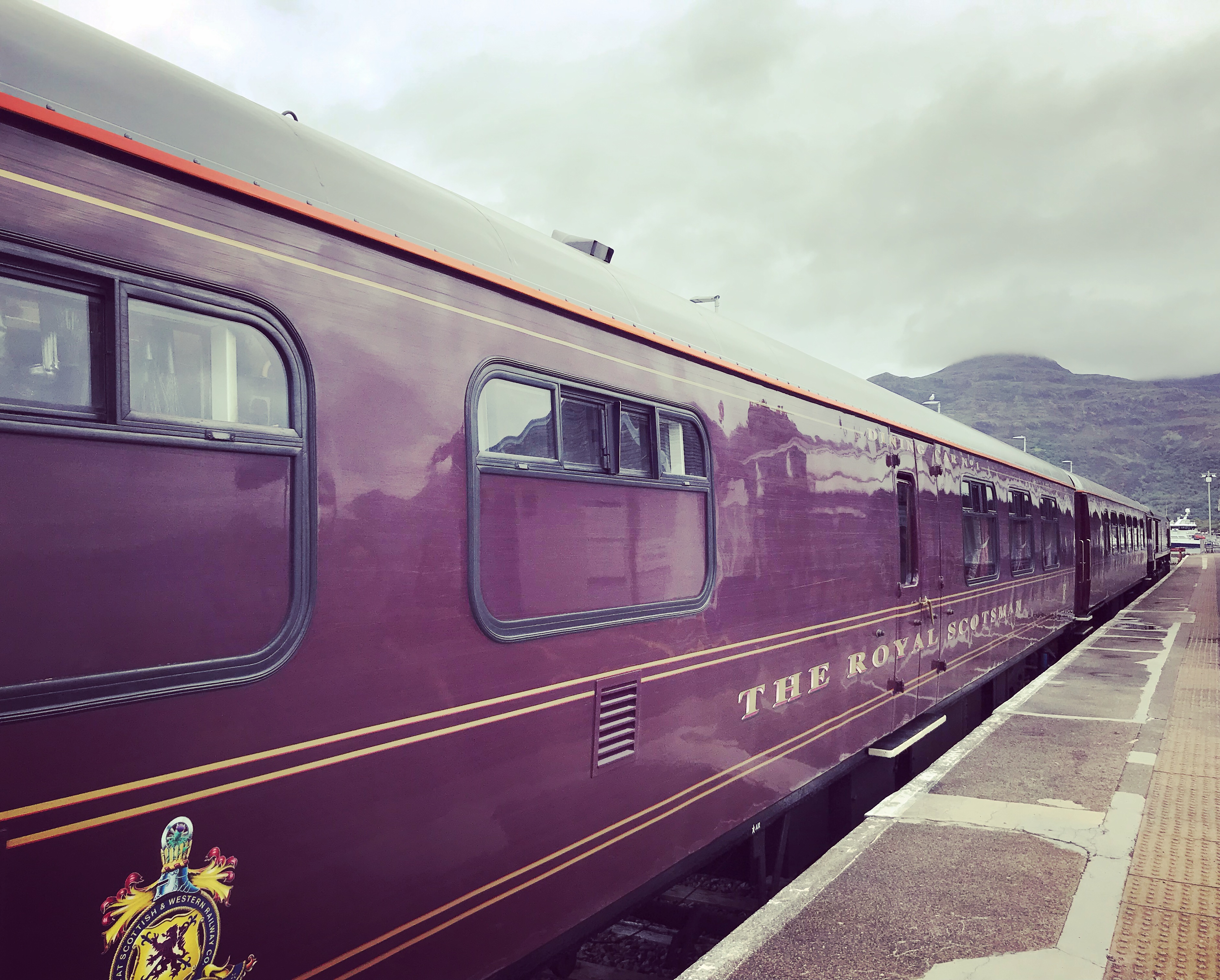
Kyle of Lochalsh Railway Station, with The Royal Scotsman train at a platform

Kyle of Lochalsh railway station is connected to Inverness by the Kyle of Lochalsh railway line, built in 1897 to improve public transport to the north-west of Scotland. The line ends on the water's edge, near where the ferry connection used to run.

Kyle of Lochalsh is a calling point for the Royal Scotsman service.

Scottish Citylink coaches also call at Kyle of Lochalsh, at the bus stop by the old ferry slipway - current routes are the 917 between Inverness and Skye and the 915 and 916 between Glasgow, Fort William and Skye (915 via Glasgow Airport). Both run at least twice a day, depending on the time of year. There are irregular local buses to Broadford and Elgol on Skye, school buses to Plockton and a taxibus service to Glenelg, Highland via Shiel Bridge (this only runs three days a week and in winter needs to be booked). Skye has additional buses in the high summer season, some of which run to Kyle.

The A87 road runs through Kyle to and from the Skye Bridge.

== In popular culture ==
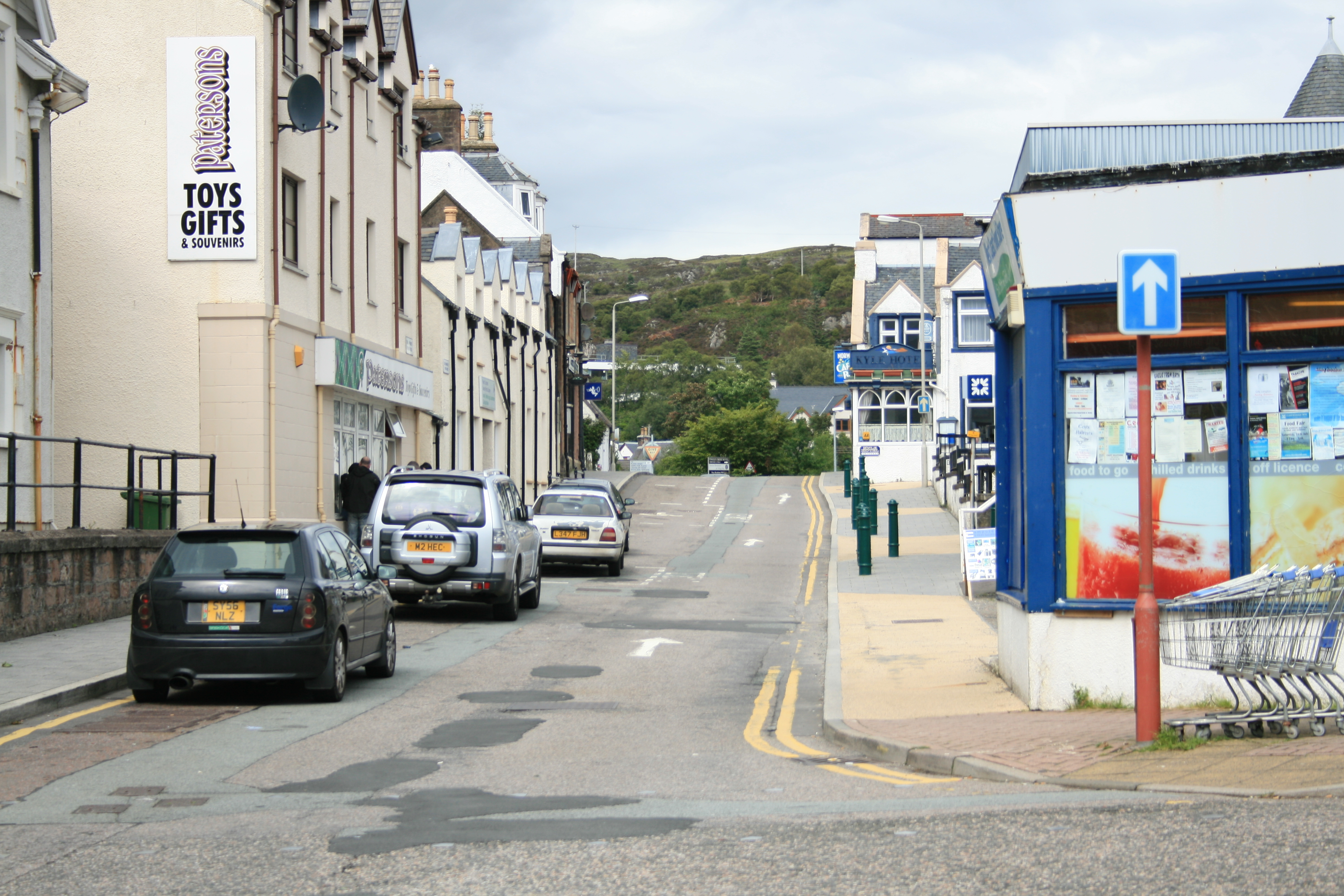
Main Street, Kyle of Lochalsh

- In 1980, the BBC did a series of documentaries, entitled Great Railway Journeys of the World. Kyle of Lochalsh appeared in an episode entitled "Confessions of a Trainspotter", presented by Michael Palin. In the segment, Palin travelled by various trains from London to Kyle of Lochalsh. Upon reaching Kyle of Lochalsh, he purchased a large piece of railway memorabilia—the Kyle of Lochalsh railway platform sign. The ending credits showed Palin taking the oversized sign with him back to London; he then hung it on his garden wall at home.
- Along with nearby village Plockton, the town became the backdrop to the BBC drama series Hamish Macbeth.
- Kyle of Lochalsh was visited by the characters in Mark Chadbourn's trilogy, Age of Misrule.
- It is the birth place of the character Roger Wakefield Mackenzie from the series of books and tv series Outlander.

== See also ==
- Port an Eòrna
