= Firth =

Scottish word used for various coastal inlets and straits

Firth is a word in the English and Scots languages used to denote various coastal waters in the United Kingdom, predominantly within Scotland. It is often used to refer to broad estuaries. In the Northern Isles, it more often refers to a smaller inlet. It is linguistically cognate to Scandinavian fjord and fjard (all from Proto-Germanic *ferþuz), with the original meaning of "sailable waterway". The word has a more constrained sense in English. Bodies of water named "firths" tend to be more common on the Scottish east coast, or in the southwest of the country, although the Firth of Clyde is an exception to this. The western Highland coast contains numerous estuaries, straits, and inlets of a similar kind, but not called "firth" (e.g. the Minch and Loch Torridon); instead, these are often called sea lochs. Before about 1850, the spelling "Frith" was more common.

A firth is generally the result of ice age glaciation and is very often associated with a large river, where erosion caused by the tidal effects of incoming sea water passing upriver has widened the riverbed into an estuary. Demarcation can be rather vague. The Firth of Clyde is sometimes thought to include the estuary as far upriver as Dumbarton, but the Ordnance Survey map shows the change from river to firth occurring off Port Glasgow. In navigation terms, the dredged River Clyde Channel for shipping meets the Firth of Clyde Channel at the Tail of the Bank, where the river crosses a sandbar off Greenock as the estuary widens at the junction to the Gare Loch. Locally, the river can be described as extending even further west to Gourock point.

However, some firths are exceptions. The Cromarty Firth on the east coast of Scotland, for example, resembles a large loch with only a relatively small outlet to the sea and the Solway Firth and the Moray Firth are more like extremely large bays. The Pentland Firth is a strait rather than a bay or an inlet.

== Scottish firths ==
=== Firths on the west coast of Scotland (from north to south) ===
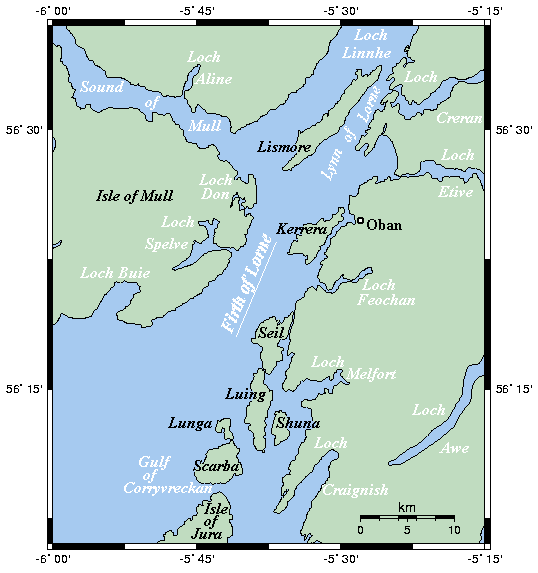
The Firth of Lorn and other nearby waterways

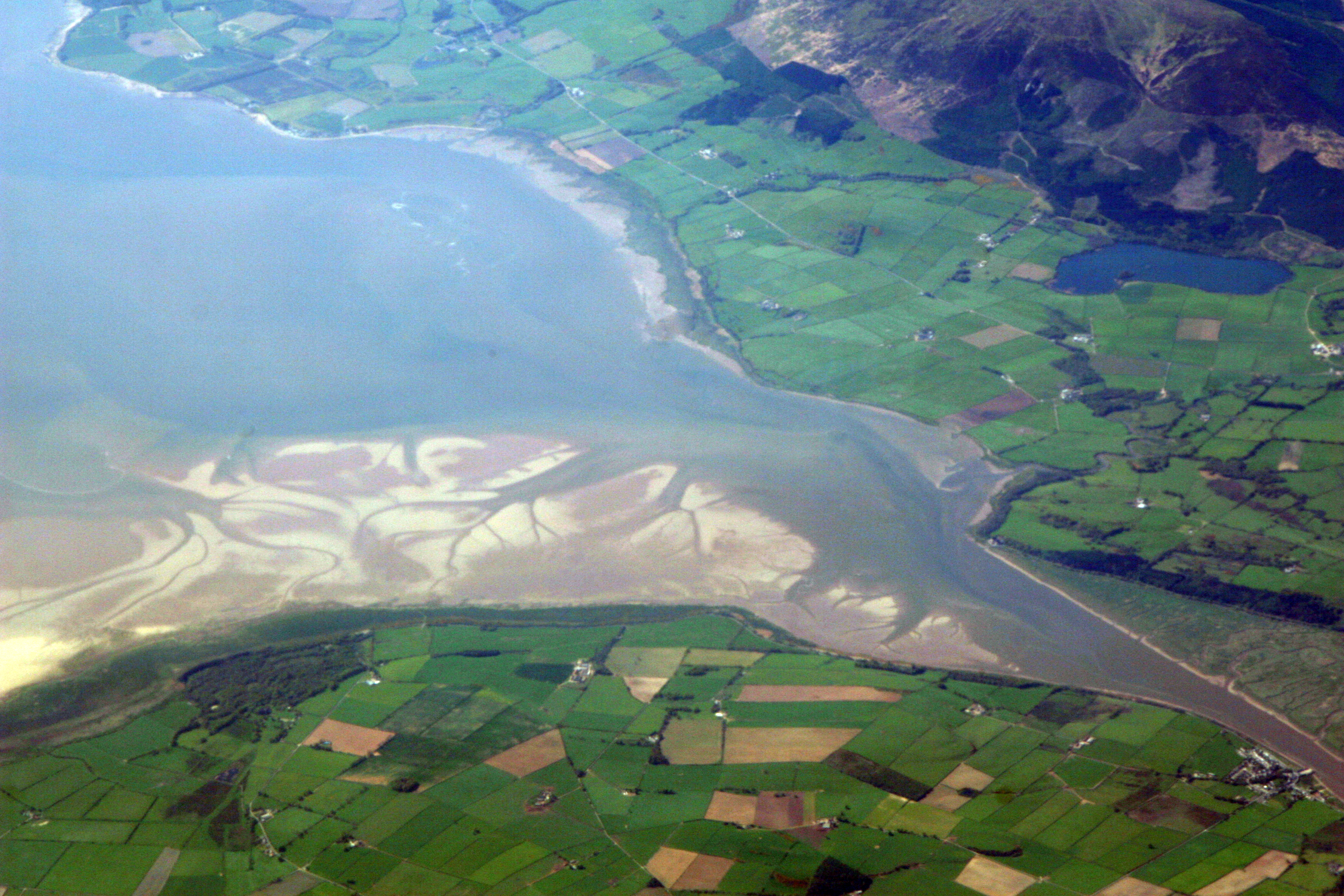
The estuary of the River Nith, opening into Solway Firth south of Dumfries.

- Firth of Lorn (connects with the Moray Firth via the Great Glen lochs and Caledonian Canal).
  - Lochs adjoining the Firth: Loch Lochy, Loch Linnhe, Loch Leven, Loch Oich.
  - Places: Oban, Fort William.
  - Islands: Isle of Mull, Lismore and Kerrera.
- Firth of Clyde (continuing from the River Clyde estuary).
  - Sea lochs adjoining the Firth of Clyde: Gare Loch, Loch Long, Holy Loch, Loch Striven, Loch Riddon off the Kyles of Bute, Loch Fyne and Campbeltown Loch.
  - Places: Helensburgh, Port Glasgow, Greenock, Gourock, Dunoon, Rothesay, Wemyss Bay, Largs, Brodick, Ardrossan, Troon, Ayr, Girvan and Campbeltown. Note that Glasgow is at the tidal limit of the River Clyde, and Clydebank, the Erskine Bridge and Dumbarton are on the river estuary as it widens out towards Port Glasgow.
  - Islands: Bute, Cumbrae, Arran
    In Scottish Gaelic, the Firth of Clyde is treated as two bodies, with the landward end being called Linne Chluaidh (IPA: [ˈʎiɲə ˈxl̪ˠuəj]; meaning the same as the English), while the area around the south of Arran, Kintyre and Ayrshire/Galloway is An Linne Ghlas Scottish Gaelic pronunciation: [ə ˈʎiɲə ˈɣl̪ˠas̪].
- Solway Firth (inlet with the rivers Eden, Esk and Nith).
  - The Firth is off the Solway Coast.
  - Rough Firth
  - Places: Carlisle, England on the River Eden, Annan and Gretna, both in Scotland. Luce Bay, Wigtown, St Bees, Aspatria

=== Firths on the east coast of Scotland (from north to south) ===
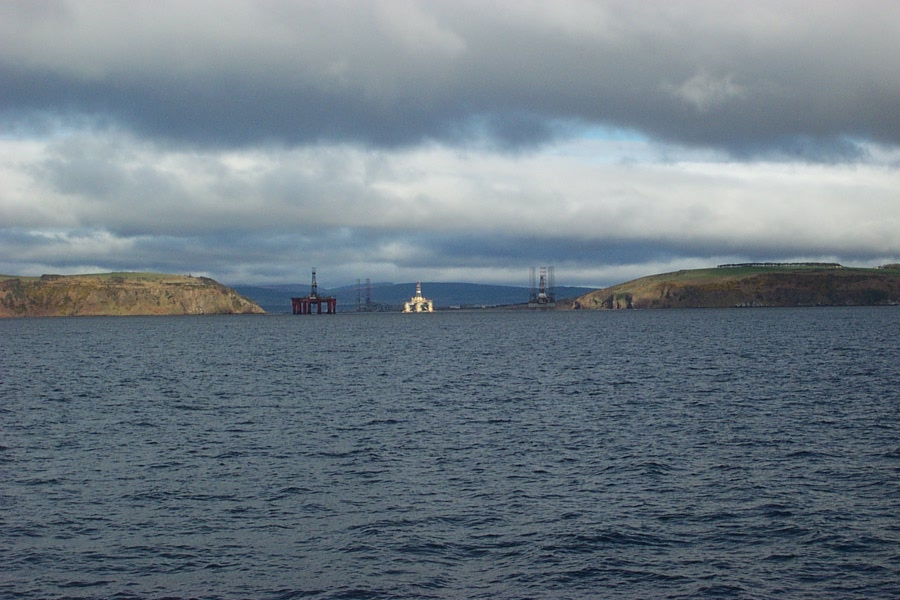
Entrance to the Cromarty Firth, with oil rigs behind

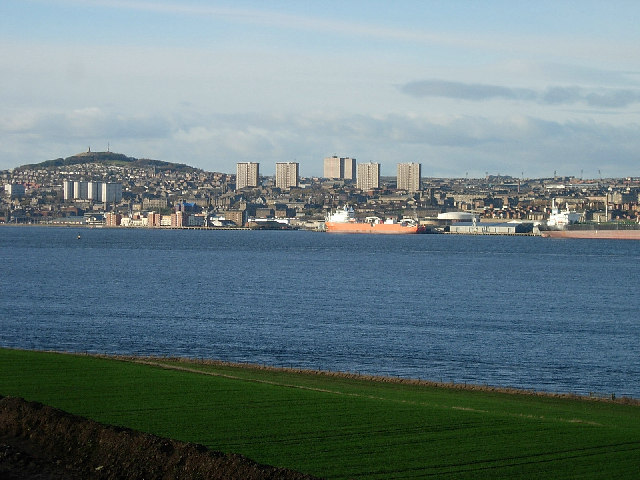
Dundee from the Fife shore of the Firth of Tay

These are connected to, or form part of, the North Sea.

- Dornoch Firth (northernmost of the eastern firths).
  - Places: Dornoch, Dornoch Firth Bridge (road bridge, 1/2 mi or 800 m long), Bonar Bridge, Kyle of Sutherland, Tain, Portmahomack on Tarbat Ness (fishing village facing west to northwest on the east coast).
  - Rivers: Oykel, Cassley, Shin and Carron
  - Headland: Tarbat Ness.
- Cromarty Firth (loch-type firth with relatively narrow opening to the sea). The Firth runs out into the Moray Firth.
  - Places: Cromarty, Dingwall, Invergordon.
  - Rivers: Conon, Orrin, Rusdale, Glass, Alness.
- Moray Firth and Beauly Firth (a loch-type firth) connected with the Firth of Inverness. The Firth of Inverness is rarely identified on modern maps, but forms a connection via the River Ness, Loch Ness and the other lochs of the Great Glen and stretches of the Caledonian Canal with the Firth of Lorne on the west coast of Scotland.
  - Places on the Moray Firth: Inverness, Nairn, Fortrose, Fort George.
  - Headlands: Whiteness Head, Chanonry Point, Alturlie Point.
  - Places on the Beauly Firth: Beauly.
- Firth of Tay (estuary of the River Tay).
  - Places: Perth, Dundee, Monifieth, Tayport, Newport on Tay, Newburgh, Fife.
  - Rivers: Tay, Earn.
  - Headland: Buddon Ness.
  - Islands: Mugdrum Island
- Firth of Forth (estuary of the River Forth).
  - Places: Edinburgh, Dunfermline, Kirkcaldy, Grangemouth, Rosyth, North Queensferry, South Queensferry, Musselburgh, Crail, Cellardyke, Anstruther, Pittenweem, St Monans, Elie, Earlsferry, Longniddry, Aberlady, Gullane, Dirleton, North Berwick. It is spanned by the Queensferry Crossing, 2,700 m (8,900 ft) long; the Forth Road Bridge, 2,512 m (8,241 ft) long; and the Forth Bridge, 2,498 m (8,196 ft) long.
  - Rivers: Forth, River Avon, Water of Leith, River Almond, River Esk, River Leven
  - Islands: Bass Rock, Craigleith, Eyebroughy, Fidra, Inchcolm, Inchgarvie, Inchkeith, Inchmickery, Isle of May, Lamb

=== Firths on the north coast of Scotland ===
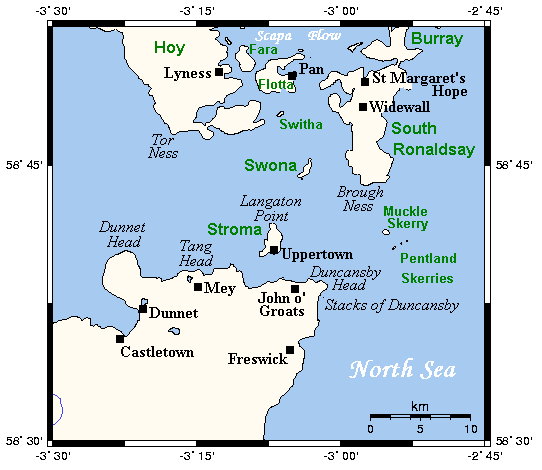
Map of the Pentland Firth and associated lands

- The Pentland Firth. This is a strait between the Scottish mainland and the Orkney Islands, and forms a link between the Atlantic Ocean and North Sea.
  - Places: John o' Groats, Canisbay, Gills Bay, Rattar (all Caithness)
  - Headlands: Brims Ness, Brough Ness, Duncansby Head, Dunnet Head
  - Islands: Hoy, Pentland Skerries, Swona, South Ronaldsay, South Walls (all generally considered to be part of Orkney); Stroma

=== Firths in the Northern Isles ===
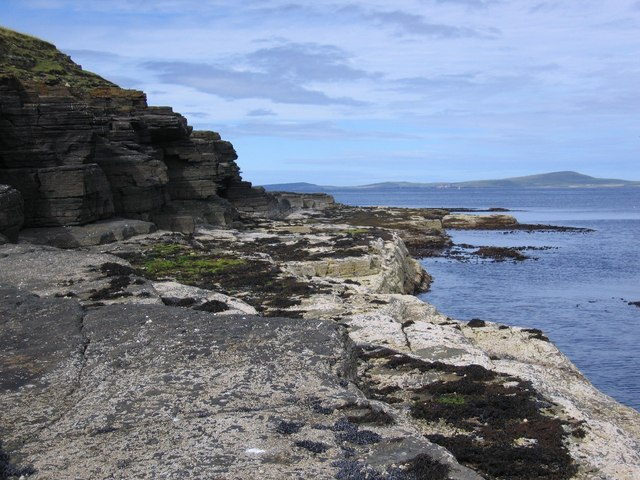
Cliffs in Saviskaill Bay on Rousay, looking northward to Westray across Westray Firth

The Northern Isles were part of Norway until the 15th century, and retain many Norse names. In Shetland in particular, "firth" can refer to smaller inlets, although geo, voe and wick are as common. In Orkney, "wick" is common.

- Orkney Islands
  - Bay of Firth (Firth, Orkney)
  - North Ronaldsay Firth
  - Stronsay Firth
  - Westray Firth
  - Wide Firth
- Shetland Islands (Mainland)
  - Lax Firth (Laxfirth) & Cat Firth near Nesting & Whiteness
  - Collafirth/Colla Firth (two places of this name)
  - Firths Voe, Firth
  - Gon Firth
  - Olna Firth
  - Olnes Firth
  - Quey Firth
  - Unie Firth
  - Ura Firth
  - Burra Firth/Burrafirth (a number of Shetland places with this name)
  - Effirth
- Shetland North Isles: Yell, Unst
  - Whale Firth
  - Burrafirth

=== Other similar waters in Scotland ===
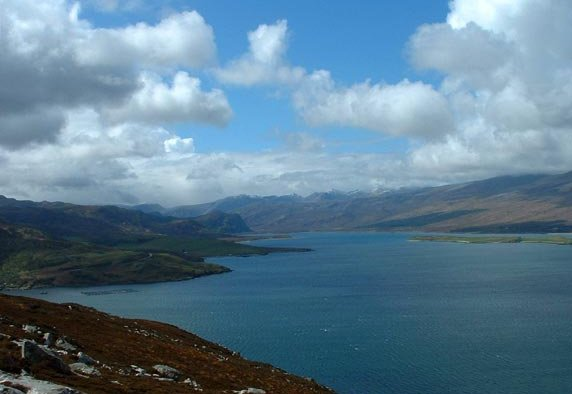
Loch Eriboll

In the Scottish Gaelic language, linne is used to refer to most of the firths above; it is also applied to the Sound of Sleat, Crowlin Sound, Cuillin Sound, Sound of Jura, Sound of Raasay, and part of Loch Linnhe.

The following is a selection of other bodies of water in Scotland which are similar to various firths, but which are not termed such –

- West coast
  - Loch Broom (fjord), Loch Eriboll (fjord), Loch Hourn (fjord), Loch Tarbert, Jura (fjord), Loch Torridon (fjord); Loch Sween, a fjord, The Minch (Strait, "Skotlandsfjörð" ("Scotland's fjord/firth") in Old Norse.)
- East coast
  - Eden Mouth (estuary, near St Andrews); Findhorn Bay, Montrose Basin (estuary/lagoon with narrow entrance); Tweed mouth (estuary, very near Scottish border)

Likewise, in the Northern Isles, the words "firth" and "sound" are often used arbitrarily or interchangeably. Bluemull Sound for example, is very similar to some of the firths in the Shetland Islands.

== English firths ==
- Solway Firth (inlet with the rivers Eden, Esk and Nith).
  - The Firth is off the Solway Coast.
  - Places: Carlisle, England on the River Eden, Annan and Gretna, both in Scotland. Luce Bay, Wigtown, St Bees, Aspatria

== Firths outside Britain ==
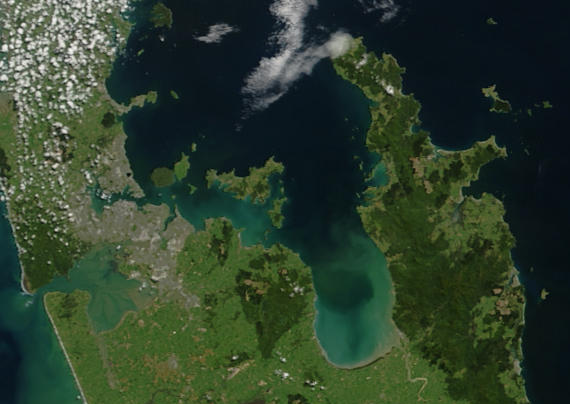
The Firth of Thames is the large bay to the southeast

- Flensburg Firth, an inlet forming part of the border between Denmark and Germany
- Kiel Firth, an inlet between Danish Wold and Wagria that forms part of Kiel Bay
- The Firth of Thames is a bay at the mouth of the Waihou River (formerly named the Thames) in New Zealand
- Firth of Tay, Antarctica. Named in conjunction with neighbouring Dundee Island, as the original Firth of Tay adjoins Dundee.

== See also ==
- List of waterways
- Loch
- Fjord
- Ria
