= Fuath =

Malevolent spirits in Scottish Highland folklore

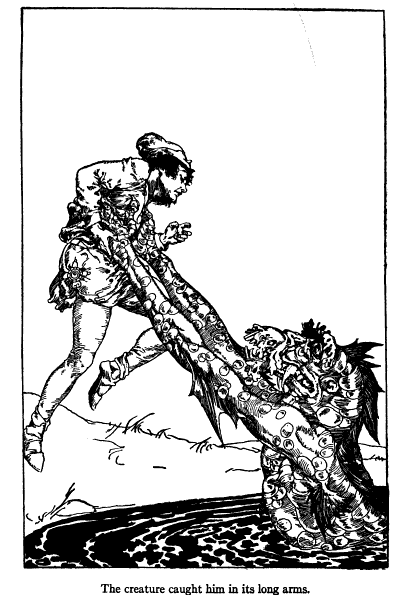
A "fua" of the river grabs hold of The King of Ireland's Son. —Illust. Willy Pogany. Colum, Padraic (1916). King of Ireland's son

A fuath (Scottish Gaelic: fuath; Scottish Gaelic pronunciation: [fuə]; lit. ‘hatred'; plural: fuathan; phonetic English: vough, vaugh) is a class of malevolent spirits in Scottish Highland folklore and Irish Folklore especially water spirits.

In Sutherland was the so-called Moulin na Vaugha/Fouadh, ‘Mill of the Fuath', haunted by the fuath and her son, the amorphous brollachan. The mill was along a stream off Loch Migdale, and belonged to the Dempster family (Skibo Castle) estate.

A fuath once seen at this mill was a nose-less banshee with yellow hair wearing a green silk dress; in the story of its capture (Note: Where the fuath is called a "kelpie") it was tormented into submission by use of steel (awl, and more effectively by a sewing needle), but it turned to a jellyfish-like mass when light was shone on it. A fuath on the estate farm, encountered on a different occasion, had webbed feet.

They sometimes reputedly intermarry with human beings (typically the female), whose offspring develop a mane and tail.

== Nomenclature ==
The term "fuath" has been explained to be a generic class of spirits inhabiting the sea, rivers, fresh water, or sea lochs, with several "subspecies" falling under it.

The Scottish Gaelic term fuath has been explained to mean 'hatred' or 'aversion', derived from Old Irish fúath 'hate, likeness'. The term is also glossed to mean 'ghost' or 'spectre'.

An alternative name for this class of monsters is the arrachd or fuath-arrachd.

== Generalization ==
=== Aquatic nature ===
J. F. Campbell characterized the fuath of Sutherland as a water spirit, but it has been stressed by John Gregorson Campbell that the term designates a spectre or goblin more generally, not necessarily of aqueous nature or habitat.

=== Conflated description ===
J. F. Campbell also conflated the traits of the fuath from different accounts in a generalized description of the fuath of Sutherland (Note: The traits are already enumerated above, in the leading paragraph.) and this has also fallen under criticism by Gregorson. (Note: Although the main tale and many of the variants he conflates are set in the same mill, as explained below)

Furthermore, J. F. Campbell ascribed the mane and tail to the fuath, though these traits had evidently developed in the human progeny of the Munroe family, to which there was attached a floating rumour that their ancestor had interbred with a fuath several generations back. (Note: Carol Rose's amalgamation has confers a "long spikey tail" on the fuath, emerging from the green robe.)

While it has been generalized that the fuath of the locality wears green, "golden and silken gear" was worn by the weird woman seen plunging into the River Shin was seen by a (games)keeper of the Charlotte Dempster's family.

== Tales ==
A fuath (in this instance spelled "fua") appears in the tale "The King of Ireland's Son". In it, the creature emerges from a body of water and attempts to steal the anvil of Goban Saor, a mythical craftsman. The King of Ireland's Son wrestles with the creature over the course of three nights in order to gain the favor of Goban Saor.

The story of "The Brollachan" (and several of its variant tales) from Sutherland were collected by Charlotte Dempster in 1859, and supplied to J. F. Campbell who printed it. The stories are set in locales within the Dempster family estate (otherwise known as Skibo) (Note: As mentioned in another variant, where it is explained that "from Skibo there is a lake.. Migdall.. at one end a burn runs out past Moulinna Vaugha, or the kelpie's mill".) The writer Charlotte was a relative of the Dempsters of the estate (being the granddaughter of Harriet, the illegitimate daughter of the captain).

- (1) J. F. Campbell ed. (1860) "The Brollachan" (Popular Tales II, Tale #37); Charlotte Dempster ed. (1888) "The Brolachan MacVaugh" (Sutherlandshire, Moulin na Gleannan "Mill of the Glenn") (Note: The same mill also is known as Moulin na Vaugha "Mill of the Fuath" according to the variant tale below about the capture, Campbell's variant 1 (Dempster's vii). This mill was within (or at least near) the expansion to the estate purchased by Captain John Hamilton Dempster, and on the purchased land's survey map the mill is labeled with the sprite's name spelt "fouah".)

Two redactions collected from the same storyteller. (Note: Marie Calder, aka Widow M. Calder) The brollachan is the son of a fuath, as the latter title indicates. (Note: The fuath and vough(vaugh) spellings are interchangeably used.) The brollachan possesses eyes and mouth, but a shapeless mass of a body, and capable of speaking only two words/phrases, "Myself" and "Yourself" (mi-phrein and tu-phrein). (Note: Dempster concludes that the brollachan is the equivalent of the Manx glashan or brounie, and also equatable to the Boneless bug or goblin mentioned by Reginald Scot in Discoverie of Witchcraft (1584).)
The brollachan was lying at the mill when the "Allay na Moulin" Murray, the resident alms-receiving crippled man around the mill came and stoked the fire with peat, causing burns on him. But due to the limits of his vocabulary, the blob could not properly speak the name of the perpetrator. (Note: Briggs refers to this tale as a Nemo type, where Nemo is Latin for "No One", referring to the name ("Outis" in Greek) that Odysseus employed on the isle of the Cyclops. Cf. Campbell's variant/parallel 9 (p. 198).)

- (2) J. F. Campbell ed. (1860) "Moulion na Fuadh"; Dempster ed. (1888) "The Vaugh of Moulinna Vuagha" (Sutherland, same mill as above.)

A man who lives in Inveran wagers he can go and capture the "kelpie" of the mill (also called the vough, vaugh) and return. He succeeds thanks to a black-muzzled dog, and binds the kelpie to a second horse. When fording the burn at the far end (south) of Loch Migdale the vough grows agitated, and the man pokes it with an awl and a sewing needle into submission. The creature declares the needle is worse. Upon arrival, when the others shine a light at it, it falls down, a shapeless jelly-like clump, which is much like the so-called "dropped stars" of the moors, strange objects like beached jellyfish.

- (3) J. F. Campbell ed. (1860), untitled variant; Dempster ed. (1888) "The Banshee, or Vaugh, or Weird Woman of the Water" (Sutherland, same mill as above.) (Note: Misspelt lake name in Campbell: "Nigdall", (recté Migdall), as confirmed in Dempster's redaction.)

At the mill haunted by the brollachan, a banshee was spotted who had yellow hair like ripened wheat, wearing a fine silk green dress, but she had no nose.

- (4) J. F. Campbell ed. (1860), untitled variant; Dempster ed. (1888) "The Web-footed Kelpie" (Sutherland, Dempster family sheep farm.) (Note: Though not specified, the Creich farm near mill is known for sheep-raising.)

The (family's) shepherd found a dirty and lamed banshee and piggybacked her, until he noticed her webbed feet, throwing her off and flinging away the plaid she lay on.

== Fuath tribe members ==
Below are the supposed "subspecies" of the fuath class, according to certain commentators.

- peallaidh
- fideal
- beithir, in modern oral tradition
- ùruisg, or at least many of them (Note: Mackenzie states categorically "Peallaidh was a fuath" and adds "a form of Peallaidh or the urisk on the east coast of Scotland in the Lowlands was shellycoat"）) (Note: Briggs states "many at least of the urisks, and presumably nuckelavee".)
- shellycoat
- nuckelavee

=== Similar beings ===
Similarity or equivalence to the bean nighe or Northern Ireland's uisges have been noted.
