= Invershin Castle =

Former Scottish castle

Coordinates: 57.93359°N 4.41212°W

- Invershin, Highland, Scotland
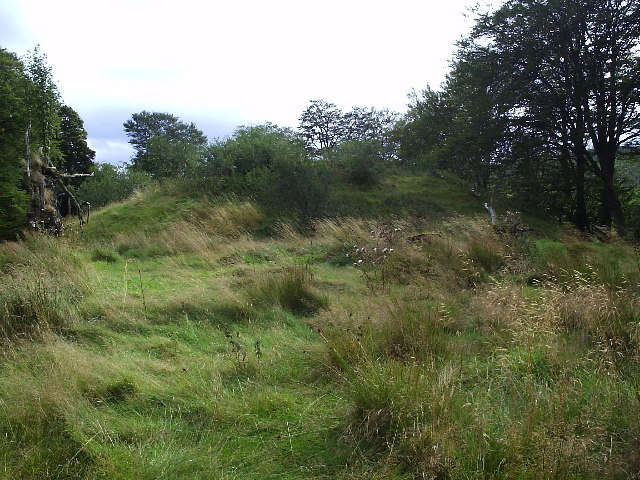
- Remains of the motte

Invershin Castle was a motte castle, located near Invershin, Highland in Scotland.

== History ==
The castle was constructed possibly in the 12th century, on a bank above the Kyle of Sutherland, close to the junction of the River Shin and the River Oykel.

The Murray of Culbin family held lands in Invershin in the 12th century and these passed by marriage of the heiress Gyles Murray to Thomas Kinnaird, in the 15th century.
