= Battle of Tuiteam Tarbhach =

Scottish clan battle c. 1406

- Part of the Scottish clan wars
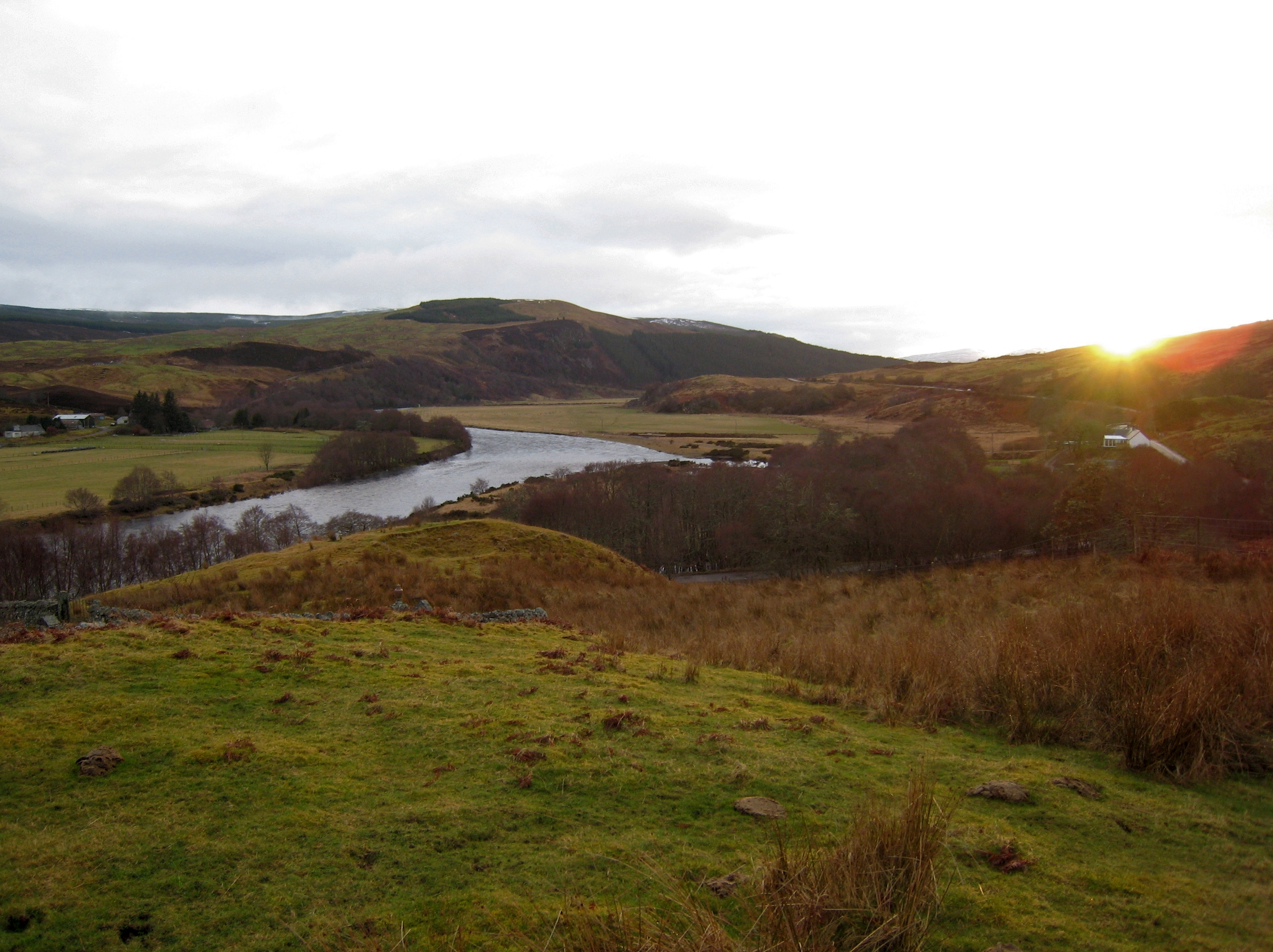
- Battlefield looking westwards from the cemetery. The Tutim Burn joins the Oykel roughly level with Tuiteam house, the white building on the right.
Date	1406?
Location	North bank of River Oykel 57°58′32″N 4°38′45″W
Result	Decisive Mackay victory

Belligerents
Clan Mackay; Clan Sutherland	Clan MacLeod of Lewis

Commanders and leaders
Angus Mackay; Hugh Mackay; Alexander Murray	Malcolm MacLeod

Strength
Unknown	Unknown

Casualties and losses
Unknown	1 survivor

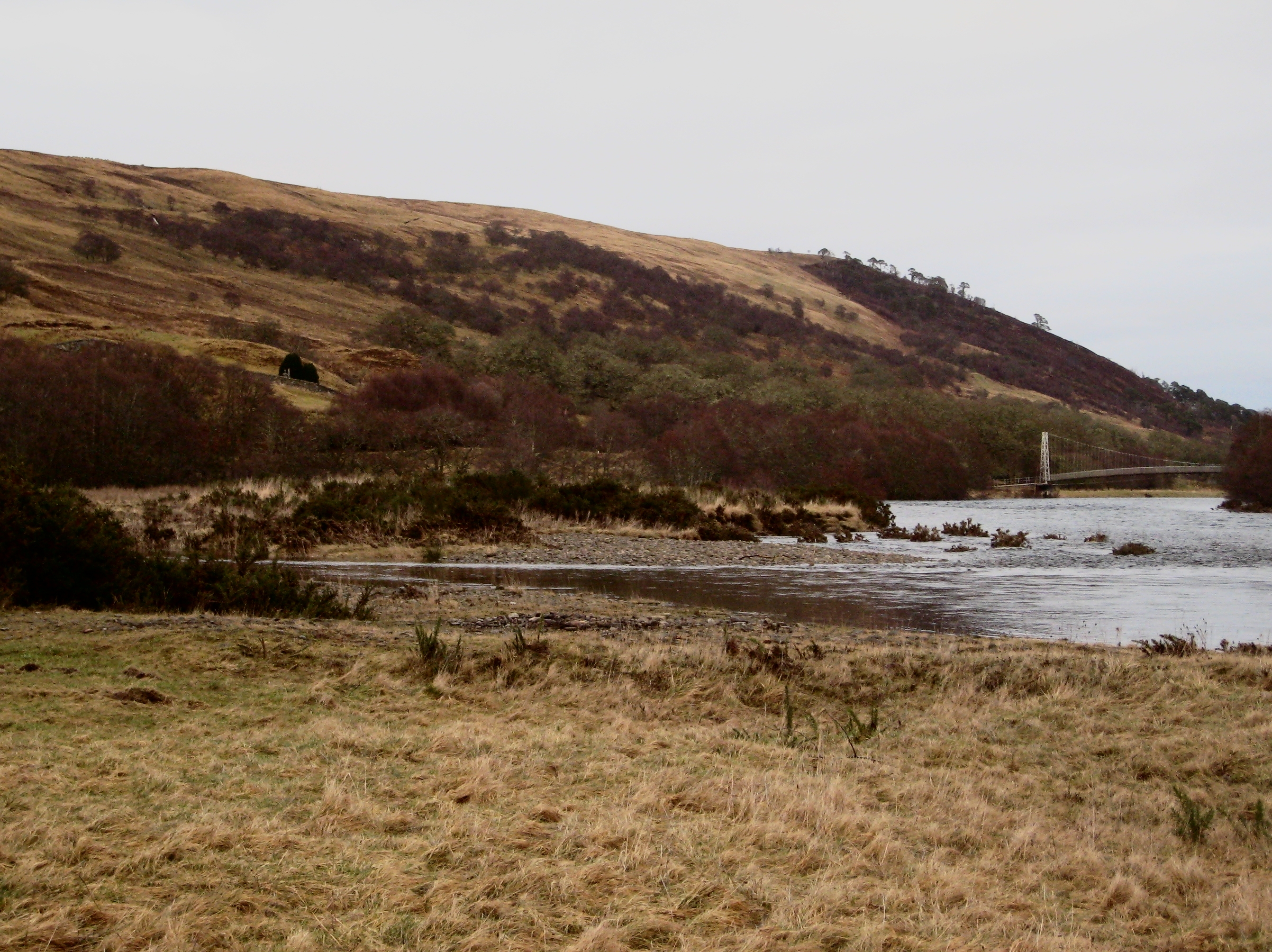
Mouth of the Tutim Burn looking east towards the cemetery

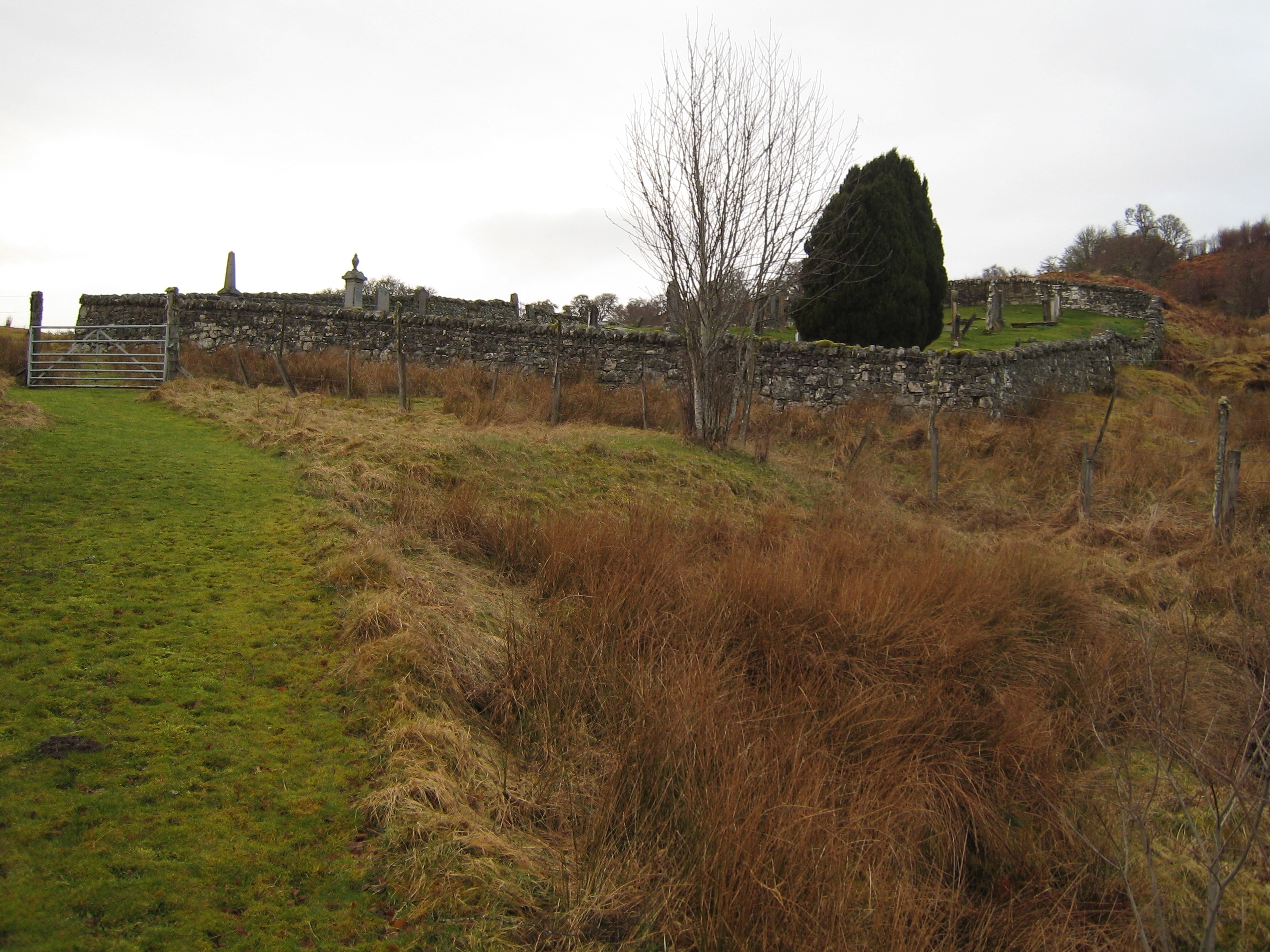
Tutim cemetery

The Battle of Tuiteam Tarbhach (Scottish Gaelic: "plentiful slaughter"; also known as Tuttim–Tarwach, Tuttim–Turwigh, Tuttim–Tarwigh or Tutim Tarvach) was a Scottish clan battle in which the Mackays wiped out raiders from the Clan MacLeod of Lewis who were returning from an attack on Mackay land in Strathnaver. The Mackays caught up with the raiders on the north bank of the River Oykel some three miles (five kilometres) west of where the river joins the River Cassley at the head of the Kyle of Sutherland. The battle probably took place in 1406, but the date is uncertain from the manuscripts.

== Background ==
Angus Mackay, 6th of Strathnaver had married Sidheag, sister of Roderick, chief of the MacLeods. When Angus died, he left his brother Black Hugh (Uistean Dow or Houcheon Dubh) as regent ("tutor") for his two sons Angus Dow (Dubh) and Rory Gald (Roderick Gald, "Lowland"). When Roderick heard that his sister was in dispute with Hugh Mackay in 1406, he decided to resolve the matter by sending a company of men to the Reay Country, the Mackay lands that bordered Caithness. The men were led by Roderick's brother, Malcolm (Máel Coluim or Maol Choluim) MacLeod, later known as Gille-caluim Beag, Gill-callum-beg-Macbhowan or Gilealm Beg McBowen ("Malcolm the Little"); "gille" had come to replace "maol" in such names.

Failing to come to an amicable agreement, Malcolm ravaged Mackay lands in Strathnaver, and the Sutherland district of Brae-Chat (Breachat), around Lairg at the south end of Loch Shin. This provoked the Mackays, and according to Sir Robert Gordon, it also provoked Robert, Earl of Sutherland, the latter sending a company of men under Alexander Murray of Culbin (Alistair Ne-Shrem-Gorme) to join Hugh Mackay in pursuit of the raiders.

== Battle plans ==
The River Oykel and its estuary the Kyle of Sutherland stretch across the Highlands from Dornoch on the east coast almost to Ullapool on the west coast. The river is the traditional boundary between Sutherland to the north and Ross to the south, and is a major transport artery linking the East Coast to the MacLeod territory of Assynt in the west. The Mackays and Sutherland men caught up with the MacLeods as they were crossing the Tutim Burn, laden down by booty and stolen cattle.

== Battle ==
Initially Mackay tried to just recover his property. When the MacLeods objected, a "long, furious, cruel, and doubtful...rather desperate than resolute" battle ensued, which ended with the slaughter of all the MacLeods except one, who managed to return to Lewis and report the defeat before dying of his wounds.

== Aftermath ==
Angus Dow succeeded his uncle as chief of the Mackays when Hugh died two years later. Despite his defeat by Donald, Lord of the Isles, at the Battle of Dingwall in 1411, the Mackays appear to have prospered and expanded under Angus Dow and he is regarded as the ancestor of all the Mackay chiefs. By 1427 he was important enough to be one of the chiefs summoned to a parliament in Inverness, where they were arrested by James I. At that time he had 4,000 men under his command according to the Scotichronicon; such power led to his nickname of Enneas-en-Imprissi, "Angus the Absolute".

Numerous cairns once marked the battlefield, but their stones have since been used for building dry stone walls. A cemetery was later built on the hillside to the east of the battlefield; according to local legend the cemetery wall was built from the cairns. Today the A837 road runs through the battlefield.

== See also ==
- Battle of Harlaw (1411) – after Dingwall, the Mackays joined the Lord of the Isles in his attempt to seize the Earldom of Ross
- Battle of Harpsdale (1426) – Mackay raid into Caithness
- Battle of Drumnacoub (1429 or 1431) – near Tongue, decisive battle of civil war between Angus Dow's offspring
- Battle of Auldicharish (1487) – Mackays defeated Clan Ross in Strathcarron after a raid on Strathoykel

== Notes and references ==
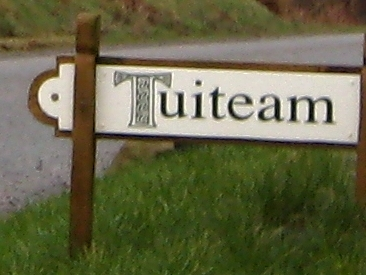

Most descriptions of the battle are based on that in Gordon's Genealogical History of the Earldom of Sutherland.
