= Spinningdale =

Coordinates: 57.88111°N 4.25352°W

Spinningdale: Scottish Gaelic: Spainiadail
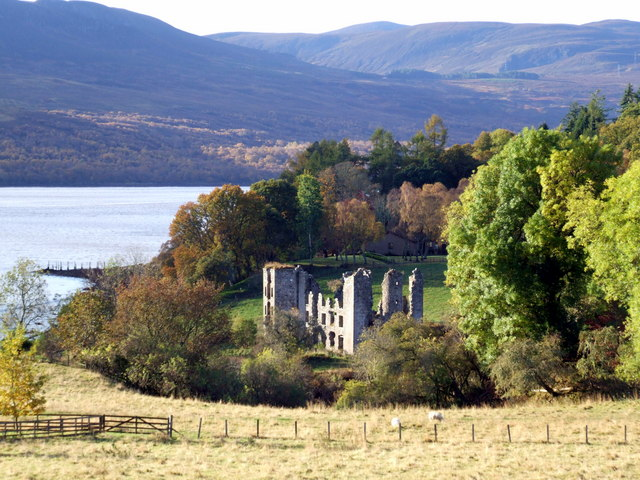
- The old mill, Spinningdale

- Location within the Sutherland area
- Population: 81 (2011)
- OS grid reference: NH664901
- Council area: Highland
- Lieutenancy area: Sutherland
- Country: Scotland
- Sovereign state: United Kingdom
- Post town: Ardgay
- Postcode district: IV24
- Police: Scotland
- Fire: Scottish
- Ambulance: Scottish

Spinningdale (Scottish Gaelic: Spainiadail) is a hamlet in the Parish of Creich, on the north shore of the Dornoch Firth in eastern Sutherland, in the Highlands of Scotland. It lies 5 miles (8 kilometres) northeast of Bonar Bridge and is in the Scottish council area of Highland.

As "dale" occurs at the end of the name, Spinningdale was probably originally a Norse name with dalr meaning 'valley' (unlike places beginning with "Dal-" which usually come from Gaelic Dail meaning 'meadow'). It may have come from Norse Spenja-dalr meaning attractive valley. It was referred to as "Spanigidill" in 1464, the pronunciation of which bears a close resemblance to modern Gaelic.

The A949 road, the old A9 before the 1991 opening of the Dornoch Firth Bridge, passes through Spinningdale.

On 1 February 2008 a fishing trawler named Spinningdale was wrecked on rocks near St Kilda.

== Notable residents ==
- James Robertson Justice, actor, lived in a cottage in Spinningdale from 1954 to 1970.
