= Invershin =

Coordinates: 57.92421°N 4.40007°W

Invershin: Scottish Gaelic: Inbhir Sin
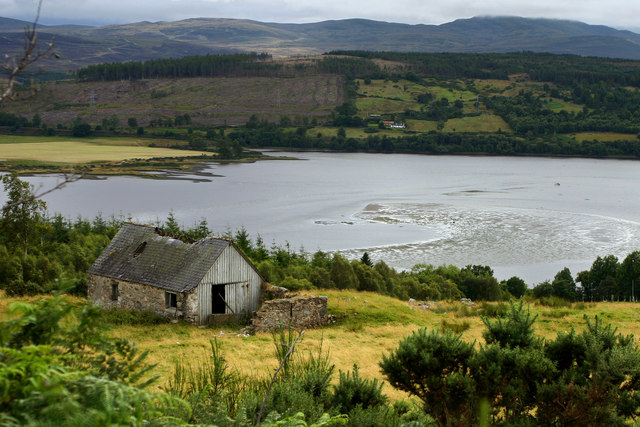
- Ruined cottage in Invershin

- Location within the Sutherland area
- OS grid reference: NH579952
- Council area: Highland
- Lieutenancy area: Sutherland
- Country: Scotland
- Sovereign state: United Kingdom
- Post town: lairg
- Postcode district: IV27
- Police: Scotland
- Fire: Scottish
- Ambulance: Scottish
- UK Parliament: Caithness, Sutherland and Easter Ross
- Scottish Parliament: Caithness, Sutherland and Ross

Invershin (Scottish Gaelic: Inbhir Sin) is a scattered village in the Parish of Creich, 6 miles (10 km) south of Lairg and 4 miles (6.4 km) north of Bonar Bridge in the south of Sutherland in the Scottish Highlands and is in the Scottish council area of Highland.

Invershin is located close to the junction of the River Shin and the River Oykel. Lands of "Inverchyn" or "Inverchen" are mentioned in 13th century documents. The motte remains of Invershin Castle are located near Invershin.

It is served by Invershin railway station, and is the location of the Shin Railway Viaduct which carries the Far North Line across the Kyle of Sutherland. In 2000, a footbridge was added to the northern side of the viaduct and is part of National Cycle Network Route 1.

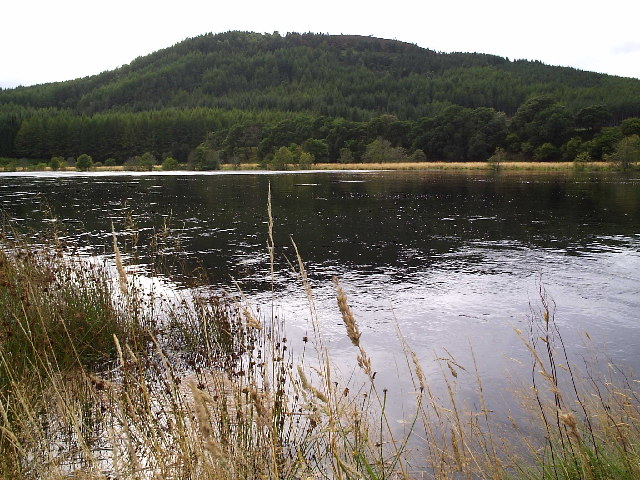
The Kyle of Sutherland from Invershin
