= Loch Shin =

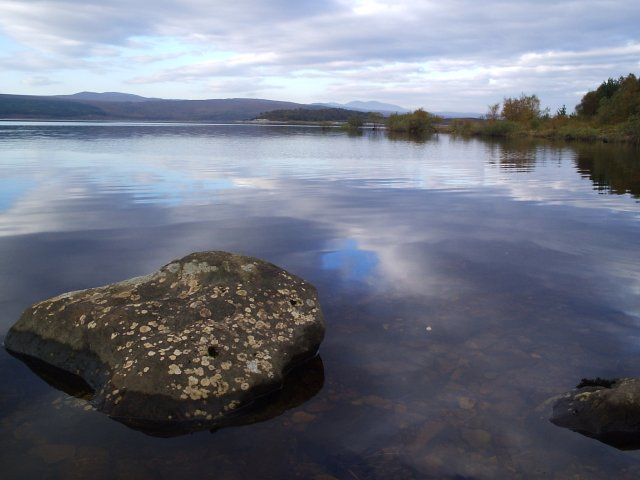

- Location within Highland
- Location: North West Scottish Highlands
- Coordinates: 58°6′N 4°32′W
- Type: freshwater loch, reservoir
- Primary outflows: River Shin
- Basin countries: Scotland
- Max. length: 17 mi (27 km)

Loch Shin (Scottish Gaelic: Loch Sìn, pronounced [l̪ˠɔx ˈʃiːn]) is a loch in the Scottish North West Highlands. To the south is the town of Lairg. The loch, the largest in Sutherland, runs from the north-west to the south-east and is 17 miles (27 kilometres) long.

In the 1950s, the level of the loch was raised by over 30 feet (9 metres) by the construction of Lairg Dam by Wimpey Construction as part of a hydro-electric scheme.

Around the loch there are mountain ranges; the 3,273-foot (998-metre) Ben More Assynt in the west and Ben Klibreck (3,154 ft or 961 m) to the east. The loch drains to the North Sea by way of the short River Shin that feeds into the Dornoch Firth at Bonar Bridge.

Three miles to the north of Lairg is a monument in remembrance of an early attempt to tame the Highlands. The area around the loch is a centre for sheep farming in Scotland.

== Sources ==
- White, Valerie (1980). Wimpey: The first hundred years. George Wimpey.
