= Rosehall =

Coordinates: 57.9825°N 4.5881°W

Rosehall: Scottish Gaelic: Innis nan Lìon
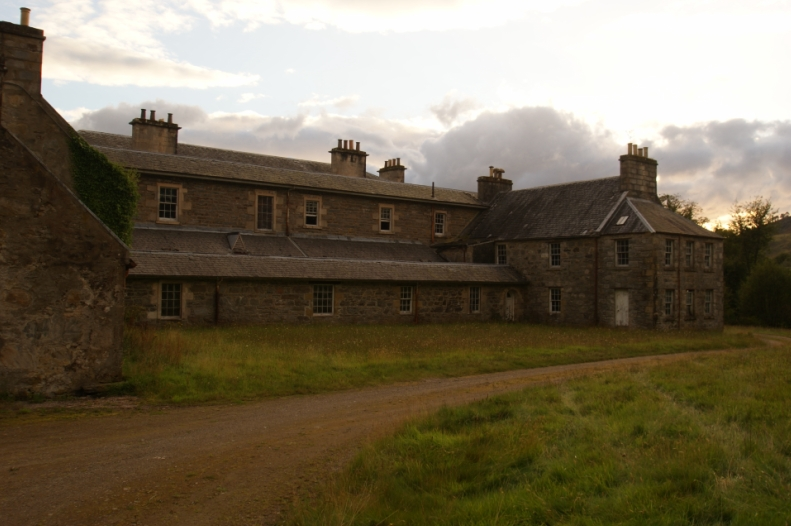
- Rosehall house

- Location within the Sutherland area
- Population: 204 (2001)
- OS grid reference: NC483012
- Council area: Highland
- Lieutenancy area: Sutherland
- Country: Scotland
- Sovereign state: United Kingdom
- Post town: Lairg
- Postcode district: IV27 4
- Police: Scotland
- Fire: Scottish
- Ambulance: Scottish

Rosehall is a remote hamlet in the Parish of Creich near the confluence of the River Cassley and the River Oykel, 1 mile northwest of Altass, in Sutherland, Scottish Highlands and is in the Scottish council area of Highland. It is the site of the main road bridge over the Cassley, which is just downstream from the Achness Waterfall, commonly known simply as the Cassley Falls.

== Amenities ==
There is a hotel which caters mostly to visitors fishing for salmon in the two rivers. There are leisure trails across the Rosehall estate and a visitor cafe.

== Rosehall Estate ==
Rosehall estate was the property of the Duke of Westminster until it was sold to become an hotel. The current house was built in 1873 after the original building was destroyed by fire. The second Duke entertained his lover Coco Chanel there.
