= Ardgay =

Village in Sutherland, Scotland

Coordinates: 57.8811°N 4.36288°W

Ardgay: Scottish Gaelic: Àird Gaoith; Scots: Airdgay
- Location within the Sutherland area
- Population: 517 (2001)
- OS grid reference: NH599904
- Council area: Highland
- Lieutenancy area: Sutherland
- Country: Scotland
- Sovereign state: United Kingdom
- Post town: ARDGAY
- Postcode district: IV24
- Dialling code: 01863
- Police: Scotland
- Fire: Scottish
- Ambulance: Scottish
- UK Parliament: Caithness, Sutherland and Easter Ross
- Scottish Parliament: Caithness, Sutherland and Ross

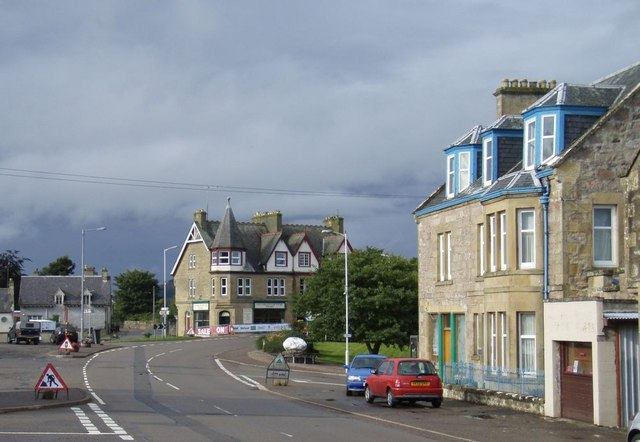
Ardgay Centre

Ardgay /ɑːrdˈɡaɪ/ ard-GY (Scottish Gaelic: Àird Gaoith or Àird Ghaoithe) ["high wind"] is a small Scottish village on the south west shore of the Dornoch Firth, Sutherland. It lies 1 mile south of Bonar Bridge, where the River Carron flows into the Kyle of Sutherland.

In the Highland Council area, Ardgay is in Ward 1, the North, West and Central Sutherland ward. The Ardgay and District Community Council serves the area. Ardgay is also the postal town for the area covered by IV24, even although Bonar Bridge is a larger settlement and provides the Delivery Office for the IV24 local area.

Ardgay is served by Ardgay railway station. The hamlet of Kincardine lies less than 1 mile south east along the A836 coast road. National Cycle Route 1 passes through Ardgay.
