= Lonemore =

Lonemore can refer to several places in the Highland council area of Scotland:

- Lonemore, Ross-shire, near Gairloch
- Lonemore, Sutherland, near Dornoch
