= Lonemore, Sutherland =

Coordinates: 57.8667°N 4.08039°W

Lonemore: Scottish Gaelic: An Lòn Mhòr
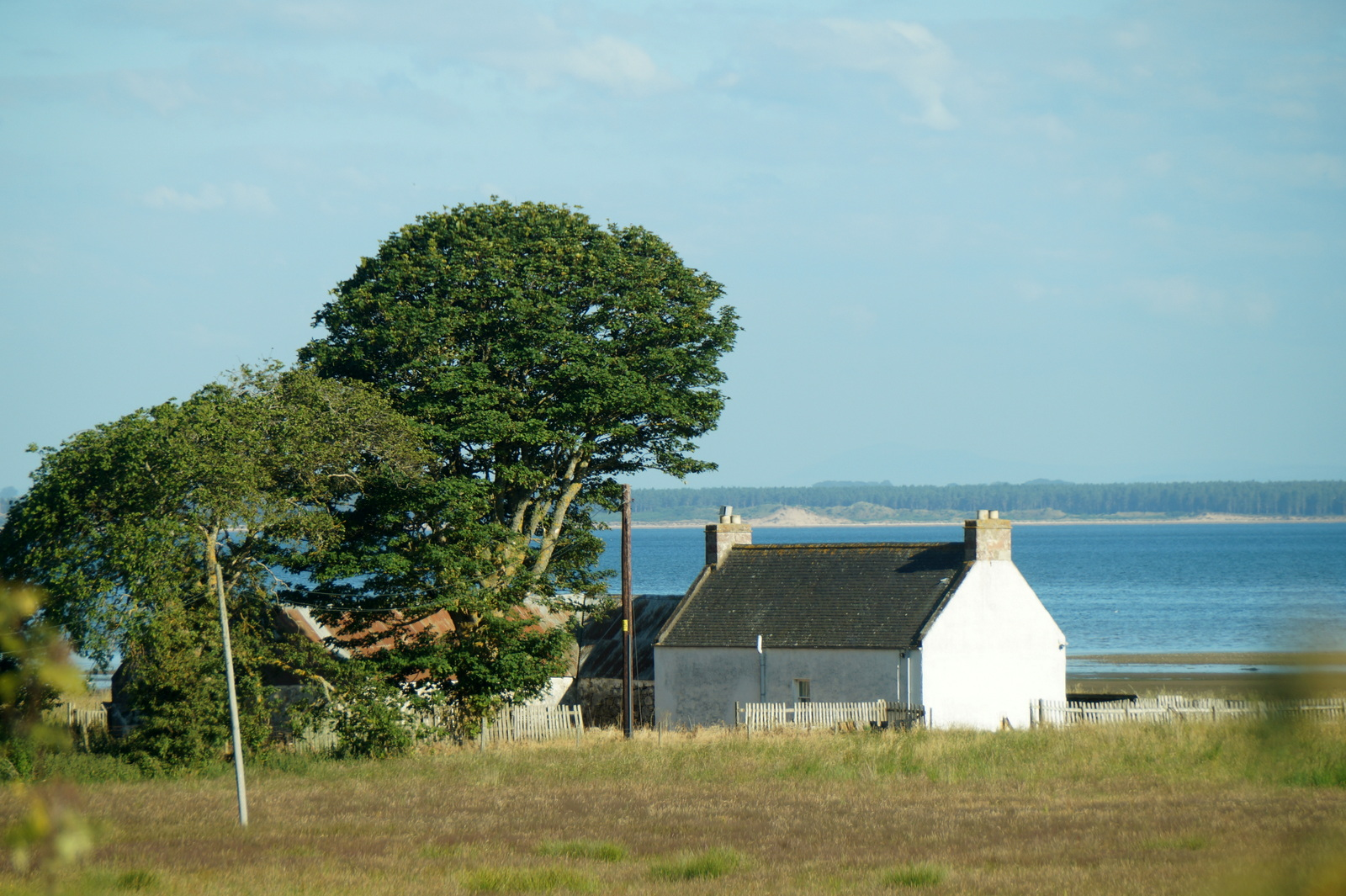
- Lonemore, near Dornoch, Sutherland

- Location within the Sutherland area
- OS grid reference: NH766882
- Council area: Highland
- Lieutenancy area: Sutherland
- Country: Scotland
- Sovereign state: United Kingdom
- Postcode district: PH20 1
- Police: Scotland
- Fire: Scottish
- Ambulance: Scottish

Lonemore (Scottish Gaelic: An Lòn Mhòr) is a village on the north shore of the Dornoch Firth in Sutherland, Scottish Highlands and is in the Scottish council area of Highland.

Lonemore lies on the road leading to Dornoch from the Meikle Ferry. To its immediate north lies Cyderhall or Sidera, whose name may be a corruption of "Sigurd's Howe", as the reputed burial place of the Viking leader Sigurd Eysteinsson whose death about 875 CE is recounted in the Orkneyinga saga.

Skibo Castle is located 0.5 miles to the northwest. In a 1783 map of Lonemore drawn up by David Aiken, the lands were divided west to east between the Skibo estate, Sir George Munro of Poyntzfield, and the Countess of Sutherland.
