= Migdale Hoard =

Bronze age Scottish hoard

Coordinates: 57.904°N 4.327°W

The Migdale Hoard is a group of early Bronze Age jewellery discovered by workmen blasting a granite knoll behind Bonar Bridge, Scotland, near what is known as "Tulloch Hill" in May 1900. It is named after the nearby Loch Migdale.

Dating from about 2000-1150 BC, the artifacts are in the custody of the National Museum of Scotland in Edinburgh. They include a bronze axe head, sets of bronze bangles and anklets, and a series of beautifully carved jet and cannel coal buttons that may well have adorned a Bronze Age jacket, bronze hair ornaments and fragments of an elaborate bronze headdress.

== See also ==
- List of hoards in Britain
