= Meikle Ferry disaster =

Shipwrecking in northern Scotland, 1809

Coordinates: 57.85264°N 4.14292°W

The Meikle Ferry took passengers across the tidal Dornoch Firth in North Scotland. On 16 August 1809, in clear weather conditions, the overloaded ferry capsized and ninety-nine people died. The disaster prompted the building of a bridge upriver at Bonar Bridge.

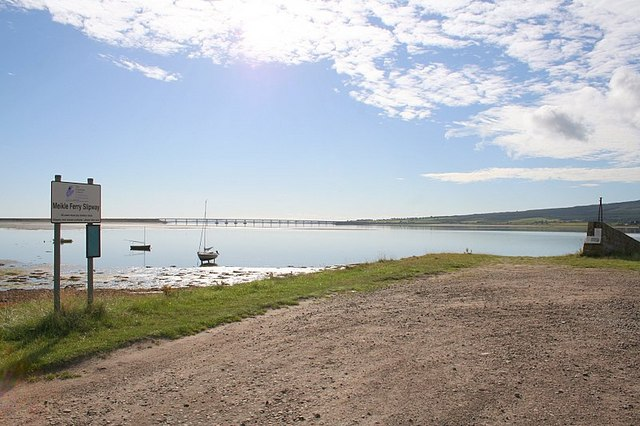
Meikle Ferry slipway.

== Ferry ==
The ferry crossed the Dornoch Firth between Meikle Ferry on the northern shore and Ferry Point at the end of Ness of Portnaculter on the southern shore. This saved travellers between the towns of Dornoch and Tain a long land journey around the inlet. The first mention of a ferry in this area was in a Charter of 1560.

In the early 19th century, the ferry was a large boat capable of transporting carriages, horses and cattle with a yawl available for foot passengers. The cattle were encouraged to swim rather than come on the boat, but they could be reluctant and were sometimes taken on the ferry. At the time of the tragedy, the boats on the crossing were reported to be in a poor state of repair with frayed ropes, torn sails and defective rudders. There was no proper quay for landing and delays were frequent.

== Disaster ==
The 16 August 1809 was the Lammas Fair in Tain. This busy market day attracted men and women from the surrounding parishes. Many were traders and craftsmen with all of their cash to bank in Tain. Some were tenants moving out of the area with cash from the sale of their flocks.

More than a hundred people boarded the ferry. This was more than the boat could comfortably carry as there was little elbow room for the oarsmen. As many as forty people were turned away (partly at the suggestion of Sheriff Donald McCulloch of Dornoch) but this still left the boat overloaded. It was claimed that drunk ferrymen encouraged the overloading.

The boat was sitting low in the water. Shortly after leaving the slipway, it came broadside to the tide. The waves swamped the boat and it began to take on water. The crowds on board panicked as the boat quickly overturned. Of the one hundred and eleven people on the boat, ninety-nine perished. Twelve people were pulled from the water.

Initial newspaper accounts reported up to 156 people dead. Subsequent publications settle on ninety-nine deaths; forty three male and fifty six female. Of these twenty were unmarried men and thirty eight unmarried girls. Of the twelve people rescued, there were four men and eight women. Of the drowned, fifty six belonged to Dornoch, twenty four to Creich, ten to Golspie, seven to Rogart and two to Lairg.

It took a number of days before all the bodies were recovered. Witnesses remarked on the horror of the scenes and the dangerous efforts some people made to retrieve the bodies of their loved ones.

== Aftermath ==
The loss of personal goods was an added burden to those relatives left behind. Many were left destitute. A memorial fund was set up to raise money for those affected by the tragedy. It raised a total of £2909 that was distributed to victims and their families. This included funds raised in Grenada and Bengal.

Some later accounts report that the sinking happened in the evening on the return journey from south to north. However contemporary reports are clear that the sinking occurred during the day and on the north to south journey.

The sinking was witnessed by James Mitchell, a civil engineer who worked with Thomas Telford. The tragedy prompted the construction of the bridge upriver at Bonar Bridge in 1812. This was designed and built by Telford The Dornoch Bridge was opened in 1991 and crosses close to the original ferry route. The Meikle Ferry continued operating until 1957.

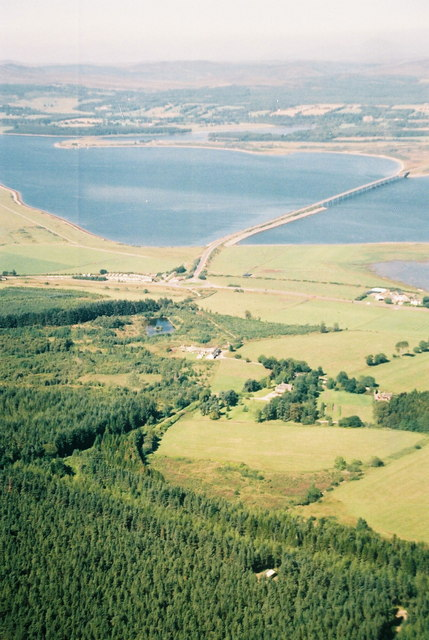
Aerial view of the Dornoch Bridge

== Notable victims ==
Donald McCulloch, Sheriff of Dornoch was on board and drowned. A memorial stone was erected in Dornoch in his memory.

== Further information ==
- At the Historylinks Archive
