= Bonar Bridge =

Coordinates: 57.8918°N 4.3371°W

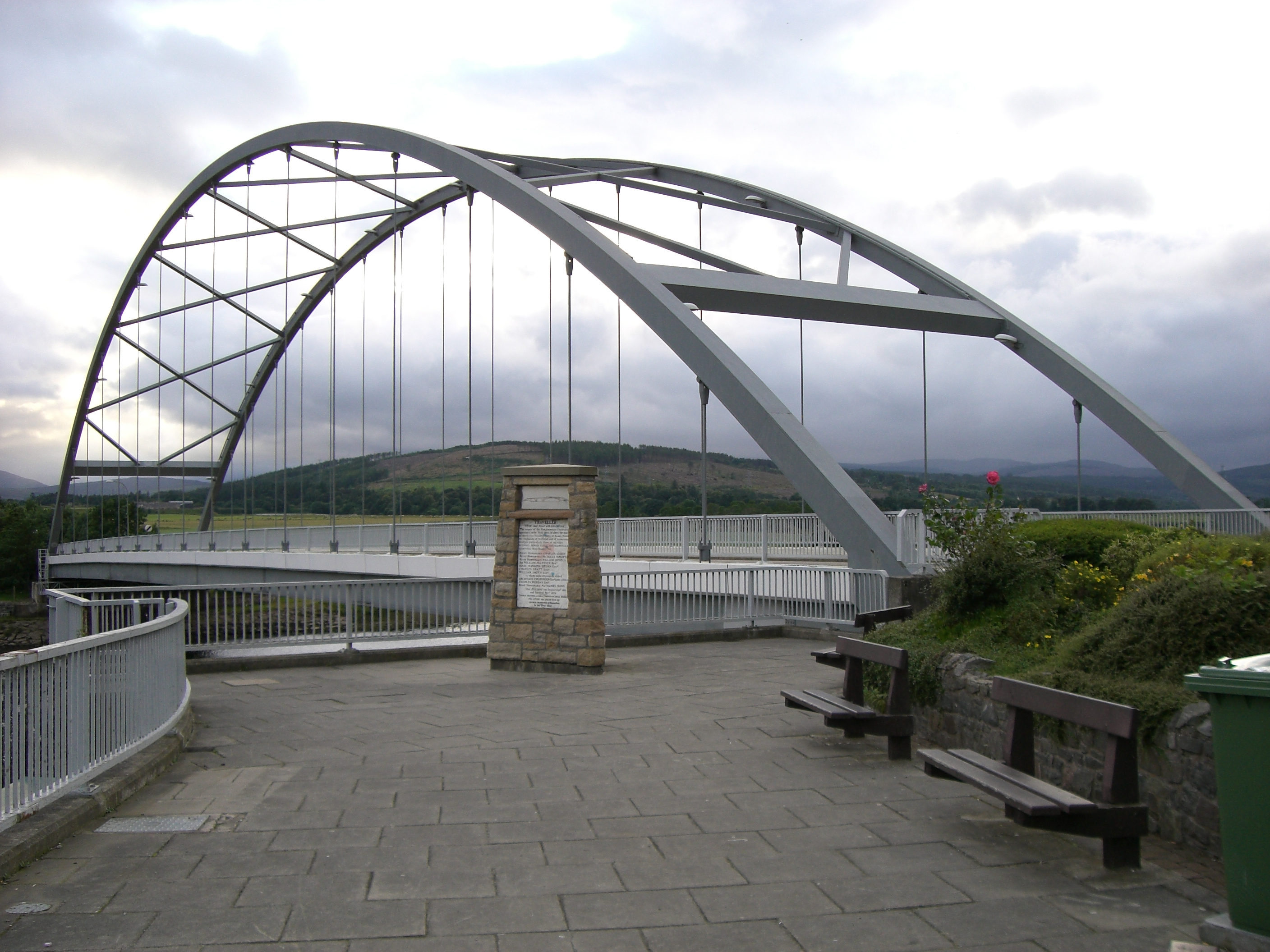
- The fording point across the Kyle of Sutherland

- Location within the Sutherland area
- Population: 724 (2011)
- OS grid reference: NH615915
  - Edinburgh: 141 miles (227 km)
  - London: 472 miles (760 km)
- Council area: Highland
- Lieutenancy area: Sutherland
- Country: Scotland
- Sovereign state: United Kingdom
- Post town: ARDGAY
- Postcode district: IV24
- Dialling code: 01863
- Police: Scotland
- Fire: Scottish
- Ambulance: Scottish
- UK Parliament: Caithness, Sutherland and Easter Ross
- Scottish Parliament: Caithness, Sutherland and Ross

Bonar Bridge (Scottish Gaelic: Drochaid a' Bhanna, pronounced [ˈt̪ɾɔxɪtʲ ə ˈvan̪ˠə]) is a village on the north bank of the Kyle of Sutherland to the west and the Dornoch Firth to the east in the Parish of Creich in the Highland council area of Scotland.

The Kyle of Sutherland ("the Kyle" for locals) is a river estuary of the Rivers Oykel, Cassley, Shin and Carron that all enter the Kyle above the bridge at Bonar.

The estuary (downstream) and the rivers (upstream) separate Sutherland from Ross and Cromarty to the south, and the estuary opens into the Dornoch Firth to the east.

== History ==
=== Pre-History ===
Evidence of pre-historic inhabitance abounds in the area with many ancient hut circles and cairns.

One excavation was performed in 2004 by the Time Team UK Television program. It excavated a small henge and a crannog (artificial-island home) in Loch Migdale.

=== Migdale Hoard ===
In May 1900, a priceless collection of early Bronze Age jewellery known as the Migdale Hoard was discovered by workmen blasting a granite knoll behind Bonar Bridge, near what is known as "Tulloch Hill".

Dating from about 2000BC, the artifacts are in the custody of the National Museums Scotland in Edinburgh. The Migdale Hoard includes a bronze axe head, sets of bronze bangles and anklets, and a series of beautifully carved jet and cannel coal buttons that may well have adorned a Bronze Age jacket, bronze hair ornaments and fragments of an elaborate bronze headdress.

=== Pictish Symbol Stones ===
There are a number of Pictish Symbol stones in the surrounding area, the closest being at Creich (in field near graveyard), Kincardine Church and Edderton (one at Church, one in field).

=== Norse/Viking times ===
Sutherland was named so (Sudrland) by the Norse of Orkney as it formed the Southern part of the Norse province of "Cat". Modern Caithness was the "Ness" part, with the third part "Strathnavern" (modern StrathNaver) being the third part (now mostly in modern Sutherland). The Dornoch Firth was the boundary between "Cat" and Ross and was called "Ekkjal" (Oykell) by the Norse and it is mentioned in the Orkneyinga saga.

"In the 11th or 12th century a contest of the inhabitants with the Danes is recorded to have occurred at Drin-leah (Drum Leadh), near Bonar Bridge, whence the invaders were driven back with great loss to their ships at Portnacoulter, [Meikle Ferry]. The extraordinary number of tumuli [Cairns] or graves on the scene of [the] action, while they attenst the truth of the tradition, and the greatness of the slaughter, cannot fail to excite the wonder of reflecting persons at the great numbers who must have been engaged and the consequent density of the population at that remote time".

=== Appearance on maps ===
The oldest records of local place names (on North side of the Kyle) found on maps are (in order from oldest) Sordel (Swordale, from Norse name) which is now a part of Bonar Bridge and has Swordale Farm, Little Swordale (Sordel Beg) (a mixed Norse Gaelic name with "Beag" meaning small in Gaelic) which is now abandoned, Creich (sometimes with Little Creich called out), Migdale then later Tulloch . A name "Eam" occurs several times towards Invershin, past Drumliach.

One such map is Sutherland, Strath Okel & Strath Charron of Robert Gordon's from 1654 or the Bleu Atlas of 1654, both found in the National Library of Scotland.

On the South side of the Kyle, MidFearn (Ferne 1573) is the oldest location shown, with Kincardine (with its church) appearing next.

=== 17th century ===
The Battles of Invercarron and Carbisdale took place in 1650 during the Wars of the Three Kingdoms close to the village of Culrain, which lies to the West of Bonar Bridge. The battles were fought between the forces of the Scottish Covenantor Government and royalist forces loyal to the King, led by James Graham, 1st Marquess of Montrose. The royalists were defeated.

=== 18th century ===
In 1746 the Earl of Cromartie and his forces returning South were attacked by Clan Sutherland near Bonar Bridge, in what became known as the Battle of Bonar Bridge. Most of the Jacobite officers were captured, many of the men were killed and the rest were driven onto the shore where several were drowned trying to swim the Kyle of Sutherland. Thus Clan MacKenzie were prevented from joining the Jacobite army at the Battle of Culloden.

=== Nineteenth century ===
Until 1812 the only means of crossing the Dornoch Firth was by ferry. On the night of 16 August 1809 over 100 people boarded the ferry boat on the Dornoch side along with goods and stock for the market in Tain. The over-laden ferryboat set off and, though conditions were calm, the boat was dangerously low in the water. About halfway across the boat turned broadside to the tide and began to take in water. It sank almost immediately with the loss of some 99 lives, including the Sheriff of Dornoch, Hugh MacCulloch. Over £2,900 were raised for disaster relief, much of it coming from overseas. It resulted in the construction of Bonar Bridge in 1812, designed by John Simpson (1755–1815).

=== Twentieth century ===
In 1927 a school of Pilot Whales ran aground in the Bay between Bonar Bridge and Ardgay. (See another photo in Tain Museum Archive)

== Transport ==
The village is at the junction of the A836 road with the A949. The A836 leads north towards Lairg and Tongue and east over the Kyle for 4 miles to the B9176 junction to the A9 at Skiach, near Alness. Then runs along the south bank of the Dornoch Firth to the A9 near Tain. The A949 runs east along the north bank of the Firth to the A9 near Dornoch, at the other extreme of the Dornoch Firth bridge that takes the A9 over the Dornoch Firth from Tain here.

The village is a transport hub for pupils travelling to Dornoch Academy, Golspie High School and Tain Royal Academy. Stagecoach North Scotland provide numerous services via Bonar Bridge including the 25X-Inverness to Dornoch, 62-Tain to Lairg, 166-Bonar Bridge to Helmsdale, 167-Lairg to Dornoch and the X99 Wick to Inverness.

The village is one mile (1.5 kilometres) from Ardgay railway station, which lies south of the Kyle. Ardgay is on the Far North Line, the railway line linking Inverness with Wick and Thurso. For a long time, Ardgay Station (NH600904) was called Bonar Bridge Station.

Light airplanes can land at Dornoch aerodrome; otherwise the closest airport is Inverness.

== River crossing ==
=== Original ferry points on the Kyle of Sutherland ===
Originally, the Kyle of Sutherland and the rivers feeding it were crossed where Bonar Bridge lies, and at other points downstream such as Creich (where the small "Stell" ferry ruin still stands) and at what was called "Portnacoulter" (Meikle Ferry) and upstream at what was called Portinleck (Culrain-Invershin) by small ferry boats (or Cobbles) and much further upstream by small bridges (e.g. Oykel bridge).

=== Fording the Kyle of Sutherland – at Bonar ===
The Bonar Bridge site provided the best point to ford the water without having to travel too far west to cross a bridge. Thus it was the preferred place to cross while droving cattle from the north and north-east to market further south. The fording point lies slightly downstream from the current bridge, more or less where the "Bonar shot" salmon fishing station was, below the old ice-house below Dornoch Road.

=== First bridge ===
Construction of the first bridge () across the Kyle of Sutherland at Bonar Bridge started in September 1811 and completed in November 1812. The engineer was Thomas Telford and the builders were Simpson & Cargill. The components of the bridge were cast in Denbighshire and assembled there, before being taken apart and transported to its site for re-erection. The New Statistical Account for Scotland explains that consideration was given to sites at Meikle Ferry (referred to as Portnacoulter, Port a' Choltair in Gaelic, named for its shape like a "coulter" the blade of a plough) which was considered too wide, at Creich (also considered too wide) and at Portinleck (between Culrain and Invershin) which was further up the estuary and required a longer journey around and also a second bridge across the River Carron.

A plaque on the Ross-Shire side of the bridge was engraved with the following text: "Traveller, Stop and Read with gratitude the Names of the Parliamentary Commissioners appointed in the Year 1803 to direct the Making of above Five Hundred Miles of Roads through the Highlands of Scotland and of numerouse Bridges, particularly those at Beauly, Scuddel, Bonar, Fleet, and Helmsdale, connecting those Roads!"

This cast iron arch bridge carried the Great North Road, and was the prototype for several other Telford bridges, including Craigellachie Bridge, Mythe Bridge and Holt Fleet Bridge. The bridges all employed diamond-shaped bracing in the arch spandrels. Spanning 45.7 m (150 ft), Bonar Bridge cost £9,736 to build, and lasted for 80 years. Historian Roland Paxton stated that it "combined elegance with economy and strength to an unparalleled degree".

The bridge was swept away by a flood on 29 January 1892, a winter of many great floods in the North of Scotland. Apparently this event occurred as predicted by the Brahan Seer.

=== Second bridge ===
The replacement bridge of steel and granite was "built by The County Councils of Ross and Cromarty and Sutherland 1893 Opened 6th, July, 1893" (taken from an engraving in a marble plaque on the Bonar end of this bridge).

=== Third bridge ===
The third bridge built at Bonar is the currently standing bridge. It was designed by Crouch and Hogg consulting engineers and was built alongside the older bridge while it was still standing (but considered weak and needing renewal). After it was opened to traffic on 14 December 1973, the second bridge was dismantled.

=== Dornoch Firth Bridge ===
Traffic and commerce through Bonar Bridge has decreased since the construction of the Dornoch Firth Bridge, further down the estuary to the east, and other roads direct to the north-west from Dingwall.

== Toponymy ==
The Scottish Gaelic word for ford is "Àth" (pronounced "Ah"). The Kyle of Sutherland had a ford here and it became called "Am Ban Àth", "Ban" meaning 'fair', which would be "Fairford" in English.

Over time "Ban Àth" became recorded as:

- – "Bana" – on this 18th-century map as part of "Bana Ferry").
- – "Bona" – on this 1730 military map).
- – "Bonar" – on this 1744 map) as part of "Bonar Ferry".
- – "Bonar" – after the 1812 construction of the first bridge at this site.

Thus the evolution of the name reflects the evolution of the water crossing at this point: FairFord -> FairFord Ferry -> FairFord Bridge

Locals refer to the village as "Bonar", usually dropping "Bridge".

== Flora and fauna ==
Atlantic Salmon, Sea Trout, Rainbow Trout, Brown Trout, Buzzards, Osprey, Grey Seal, Oyster Catcher, etc.

== Economy ==
- Crofting and Farming
- Forestry
- Sporting salmon (rod) fishing on nearby estates and rivers
- Deer stalking
- Salmon netting (formerly)

== Tourism ==
Most years, the village celebrates its Gala Week or the Salmon Queen Week, in August.

Nearby places of interest for tourists visiting the area include:

- Ardgay
- Carbisdale Castle – a folly castle built by the dowager duchess of Sutherland and was from 1945 until 2011 a Youth Hostel owned and run by the Scottish Youth Hostel Association
- Croick Church (map), with its evocative engravings on the church windows from sufferers of the Highland Clearances in the Amat area. Undiscovered Scotland Page
- Culrain – below Carbisdale Castle
- Dornoch – a picturesque Royal Burgh with famous golf course (Royal Dornoch), a great beach and camping area, and others.
- The Falls of Shin – where you may see salmon attempt to jump up the falls on the way upstream to spawn
- Invershin
- Lairg
- Ospisdale
- Rosehall
- Skibo Castle – which is now a luxury hotel/retreat known as the Carnegie Club
- Spinningdale

== Sports ==
- Bonar Bridge/Ardgay Golf Club— a 9-hole woodland-style course in beautiful countryside overlooking Migdale Loch.
- Bonar Bridge F.C. Football club

== Notable people ==
- Ishbel Ross (1895–1975), newspaper reporter and nonfiction author
- John Murray (1898–1975), theologian
