= Inveran =

Coordinates: 57.94429°N 4.41719°W

Inveran: Scottish Gaelic: Inbhirean
- Location within the Sutherland area
- OS grid reference: NH570975
- Council area: Highland
- Country: Scotland
- Sovereign state: United Kingdom
- Post town: Lairg
- Postcode district: IV27 4
- Police: Scotland
- Fire: Scottish
- Ambulance: Scottish

Inveran (Scottish Gaelic: Inbhirean) is a small village in the Parish of Creich located in the Sutherland region of the Highland Council area of Scotland.

It is situated on the A837 at the head of the Dornoch Firth and the site of the Shin Hydro-electric Power Station.

Inveran Inn was designed by the architect William Fowler.
