= Loch Migdale =

- Loch Migdale from its northern shore

- Location within Sutherland
- Location: Bonar Bridge, Sutherland, Scotland
- Coordinates: 57°53′N 4°17′W
- Type: Freshwater Loch
- Primary inflows: Migdale Burn
- Primary outflows: Spinningdale Burn, Dornoch Firth
- Basin countries: Scotland
- Max. length: 2.93 km (1.82 mi)
- Max. width: 614.9 m (2,017 ft)
- Max. depth: approx. 7 m (23 ft)
- Surface elevation: 35 m (115 ft)
- Islands: 1
- Settlements: Bonar Bridge, Spinningdale

Loch Migdale is a freshwater loch in Sutherland, Scotland, situated between the settlements of Bonar Bridge and Spinningdale.

The loch's name at least partly derives from Old Norse: dalr i.e. "valley", an element it shares with many places in Sutherland.

The woodland and paths around Loch Migdale are managed by the Woodland Trust. It is a popular location for fishing brown trout.

Close to its western shore, the loch contains the remains of a crannog dating from the Iron Age, which was last excavated in 2004. There is also a chambered cairn on the hillside northeast of the loch, known as Red Dog or Achaidh Cairn.
