= Achness Falls =

Waterfall on the River Cassley in Sutherland, Scotland

Coordinates: 57.98885°N 4.59300°W

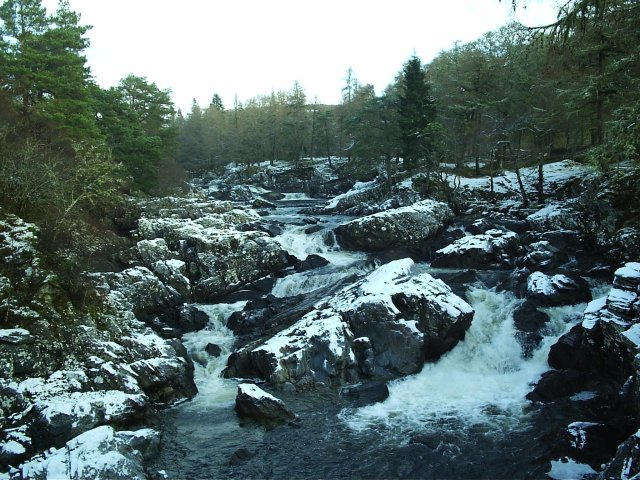
Achness Falls

Achness Falls, also known as the Achness Waterfall or Cassley Falls, is a waterfall located on the River Cassley in Sutherland, Scotland, near Rosehall and Invercassley. Its name is derived from the Scottish Gaelic Ach-an-eas, the "field of the waterfall".

The falls descend a narrow gorge with the upper fall being a 6-metre (20 ft) drop. The lower fall is a thin broken sheet of water down about 12 metres (39 ft) of rock and when in spate this becomes a torrent which has several pools providing a means for salmon to ascend. The location is the type locality and best-studied area of the Achness Thrust, a thrust fault which dips 40 to 50° to the south at the falls. Present nearby are the ruins of a broch and a more modern chapel. By the side of the river is an old cemetery and there are woodland walks.

Atlantic salmon fishing on the River Cassley has a long history. Achness Falls is a temporary barrier to the fish each spring; they do not advance beyond it until the water warms above 10 °C (50 °F). In the late 19th century, plans to destroy the waterfall to improve the salmon run were considered.

== See also ==
- List of waterfalls
- List of waterfalls of Scotland

== Bibliography ==
- Leslie, A. G.; Krabbendam, M.; Kimbell, G. S.; Strachan, R. A. (2010). "Regional-scale lateral variation and linkage in ductile thrust architecture: the Oykel Transverse Zone, and mullions, in the Moine Nappe, NW Scotland". In Law, R. D.; Butler, R. W. H.; Holdsworth, R. E.; Krabbendam, M.; Strachan, R. A. (eds.). Continental Tectonics and Mountain Building: The Legacy of Peach and Horne. Geological Society of London. pp. 359–382. ISBN 978-1-86239-300-4.
- Stott, Louis (1987). The waterfalls of Scotland : worth gaun a mile to see. Aberdeen: Aberdeen University Press. ISBN 008032424X.
