= River Cassley =

Scottish waterway in Highland

Coordinates: 57°58.5′N 4°35′W

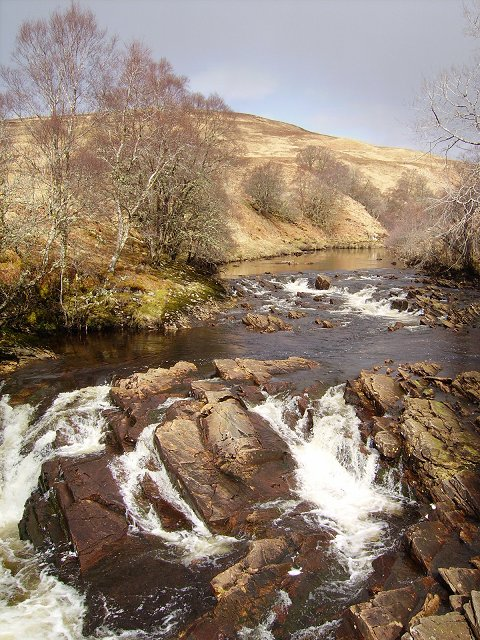
Whitewater on the Cassley

The River Cassley (Scottish Gaelic: Abhainn Charsla, pronounced [ˈa.ɪɲ ˈxaɾs̪l̪ˠə]) in Sutherland, in northern Scotland, rises on Ben More Assynt, and joins the River Oykel to form the Kyle of Sutherland at Invercassley (Inbhir Charsla). The Kyle is subsequently joined by the River Shin and River Carron (Abhainn Charrann) before it becomes the Dornoch Firth and enters the North Sea. The A837 road bridge over the river is at Rosehall, just upstream of where the river meets the Oykel, and halfway between the mouth and the Achness Waterfall or Cassley Falls.

Like its neighbour the Oykel, the Cassley is noted for its salmon and trout fishing. The river is also noted for having a resident population of freshwater pearl mussels. The lower river is in the same ownership as the Achaness Hotel at Rosehall, which provides accommodation and ghillies for visiting fishermen. In 2018, Ordnance Survey mapping of Glen Cassley, the area that the river flows through, was noted as being the map that sold the least any of the maps in the Ordnance Survey range.
