= Altass =

Coordinates: 57.9667°N 4.5327°W

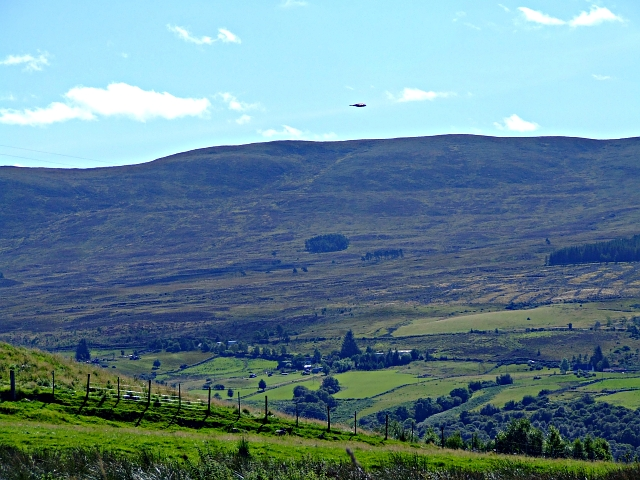
- The houses of Altass scattered along the road in the middle distance

- Location within the Sutherland area
- OS grid reference: NC4900
- Council area: Highland
- Lieutenancy area: Sutherland
- Country: Scotland
- Sovereign state: United Kingdom
- Police: Scotland
- Fire: Scottish
- Ambulance: Scottish
- UK Parliament: Caithness, Sutherland and Easter Ross
- Scottish Parliament: Caithness, Sutherland and Ross

Altass (Scottish Gaelic: Alltais) is a village in the Parish of Creich, near Lairg, Sutherland, within the Highland, Scotland, and is in the council area of Highland.
