= Ben More Assynt =

Mountain in Scotland

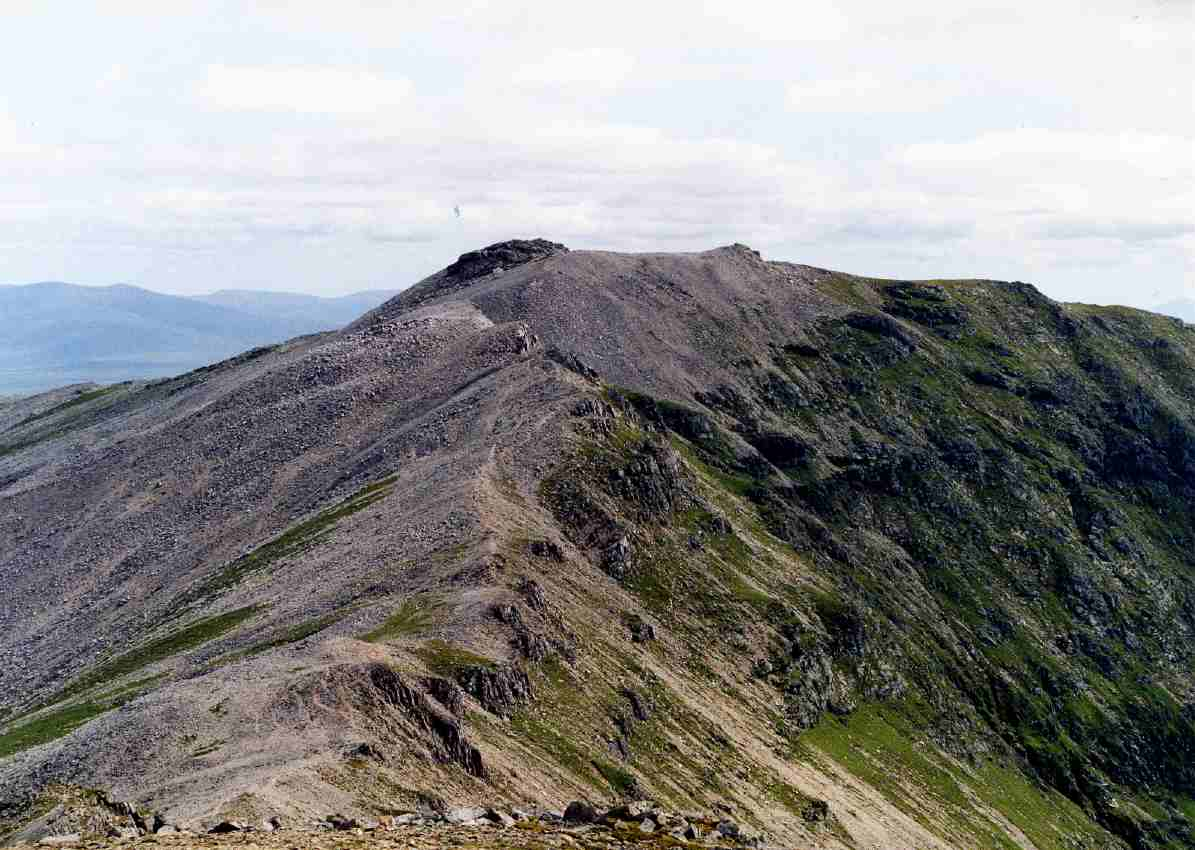
- Ben More Assynt from Conival.

Highest point
- Elevation: 998 m (3,274 ft)
- Prominence: 835 m (2,740 ft)Ranked 26th in British Isles
- Parent peak: Sgurr Mor
- Listing: Munro, Marilyn, County top (Sutherland)
- Coordinates: 58°08′17″N 4°51′29″W

Naming
- Native name: Scottish Gaelic: Beinn Mhòr Asainn
- English translation: Big mountain of Assynt
- Pronunciation: Scottish Gaelic: [peɲ ˈvoːɾ ˈas̪ɪɲ]

Geography
- Location within Sutherland
- Location: Assynt, Scotland
- Parent range: Northwest Highlands
- OS grid: NC317201
- Topo map: OS Landranger 15, OS Explorer 442

Ben More Assynt (Scottish Gaelic: Beinn Mhòr Asainn) is a mountain in Assynt in the far northwest of Scotland, 30 kilometres (19 miles) north-northeast of Ullapool. The name translates as "big mountain of Assynt", and with a height of 998 metres (3,274 feet) it is the highest point in Sutherland.

The mountain lies in the east of Assynt, set apart from the area's better known and more dramatic (but lower) mountains such as Suilven. It is hidden from the traveller on the A837 road by the adjacent Munro of Conival (Conmheall), and the best views of it are obtained from nearby summits. The higher slopes of the mountain are capped by light coloured quartzite boulders, giving it a distinctive appearance.

Over 88 km^{2} (34 sq mi) of land around Ben More Assynt have been declared a Site of Special Scientific Interest (SSSI) because of their geological interest, rare plant species and freshwater habitats.

== Geography ==
Ben More Assynt is situated on a ridge of high ground which runs roughly north to south on the east side of the A837 road near Inchnadamph. This ridge forms part of the main north–south watershed of Scotland, with drainage from the mountain reaching the North Sea and the Atlantic Ocean on opposite sides of mainland Scotland. The mountain's eastern and southern slopes are drained by the River Oykel and its tributary, the River Cassley, which flow into the Dornoch Firth on Scotland's east coast. The River Traligill drains the western flanks through Loch Assynt to reach the Atlantic at Lochinver.

The mountain is connected to the neighbouring peak of Conival to the west by a lofty ridge with a low point of 880 m (2,890 ft). Since Conival lies in the way of the ascent from Inchnadamph, the two are almost invariably ascended together. Ben More Assynt also has a subsidiary "top" listed in Munro's Tables, called simply the South Top; situated one kilometre south of the summit, it is 960 m (3,150 ft) high.

== Geology ==
The Assynt area lies within the Moine Thrust Belt and is a classic locality in the history of the development of theories about thrust tectonics. The mountains of Ben More Assynt and Conival sit on the Ben More thrust sheet which is bounded by the Ben More Thrust below and the Moine Thrust above. The thrust sheet consists of Lewisian gneiss with a cover of Torridonian sandstones and Cambrian quartzite. Lewisian gneisses are exposed to the south and southeast of the peak of Ben More Assynt and forms the ridge to the South Top, making it the highest located example of this rock type. The peak itself consists of Cambrian quartzite, which also forms the ridge to Conival and the ground to the north and northeast of the peak. Torridonian sediments are only exposed around Conival.

== Ascents ==
An ascent of Ben More Assynt is usually combined with the neighbouring Munro of Conival, which if starting from the hamlet of Inchnadamph (grid reference NC250218), is climbed first. From Inchnadamph the route of ascent follows the River Traligill to its source on the col between Conival and Beinn an Fhuarain at a height of 750 m (2,460 ft). It is then a stiff climb over shattered quartzite to reach Conival's highest point. Ben More Assynt's summit lies 1.5 km (1 mi) east and is a demanding walk over quartzite stones and scree, even though there is only just over 100 metres of re-ascent. The summit is marked by a shattered lump of quartzite. The sharp arête is quite tricky to negotiate in places; according to Ralph Storer, it "has been flatteringly compared to the Aonach Eagach, with several unexpectedly awkward moves across exposed slabs requiring care (especially when wet)".

== Wildlife and conservation ==
Ben More Assynt is home to many threatened species of vegetation. There are four species of plants which are on the World Conservation Union’s (IUCN) Red List of Threatened Species, and there are 27 nationally scarce varieties of plants within the Site of Special Scientific Interest.

In 2005 and 2006 the firm Airtricity proposed to build a 25-turbine wind farm at Invercassly, 22 km (13 1/2 mi) southeast of the mountain. Protesters used Ben More Assynt in their arguments against the project, saying that the wind farm would have a detrimental effect on the view from the mountain and the sense of wilderness would be greatly reduced. The future of the proposal is still in discussion.

== New Memorial ==
In April 1941, during the Second World War, all 6 of the crew on board an Avro Anson were killed when the aircraft crashed on Ben More Assynt. Due to the inaccessibility of the crash site, the crew were buried on the mountain; their final resting places marked with a cairn.

In 2012, the Commonwealth War Graves Commission decided to replace the existing cairn, which had deteriorated in the harsh climate, with a 600-kilogramme granite marker to identify and protect the burial site. At an elevation of around 600 m (2,000 ft), the burial site on Ben More Assynt is one of the Commission's most remote grave sites in the UK and the logistics of replacing the cairn have proved challenging. In the end, a Chinook helicopter from RAF Odiham had to be used to carry the granite memorial to the burial site. The granite memorial now marks the spot where Pilot Officer William Drew, Sergeant Jack Emery, Sergeant Harold Arthur Tompsett, Flying Officer James Henry Steyn, Sergeant Charles McPherson Mitchell and Flight Sergeant Thomas Brendon Kenny lost their lives when their aircraft crashed.

== Gallery ==
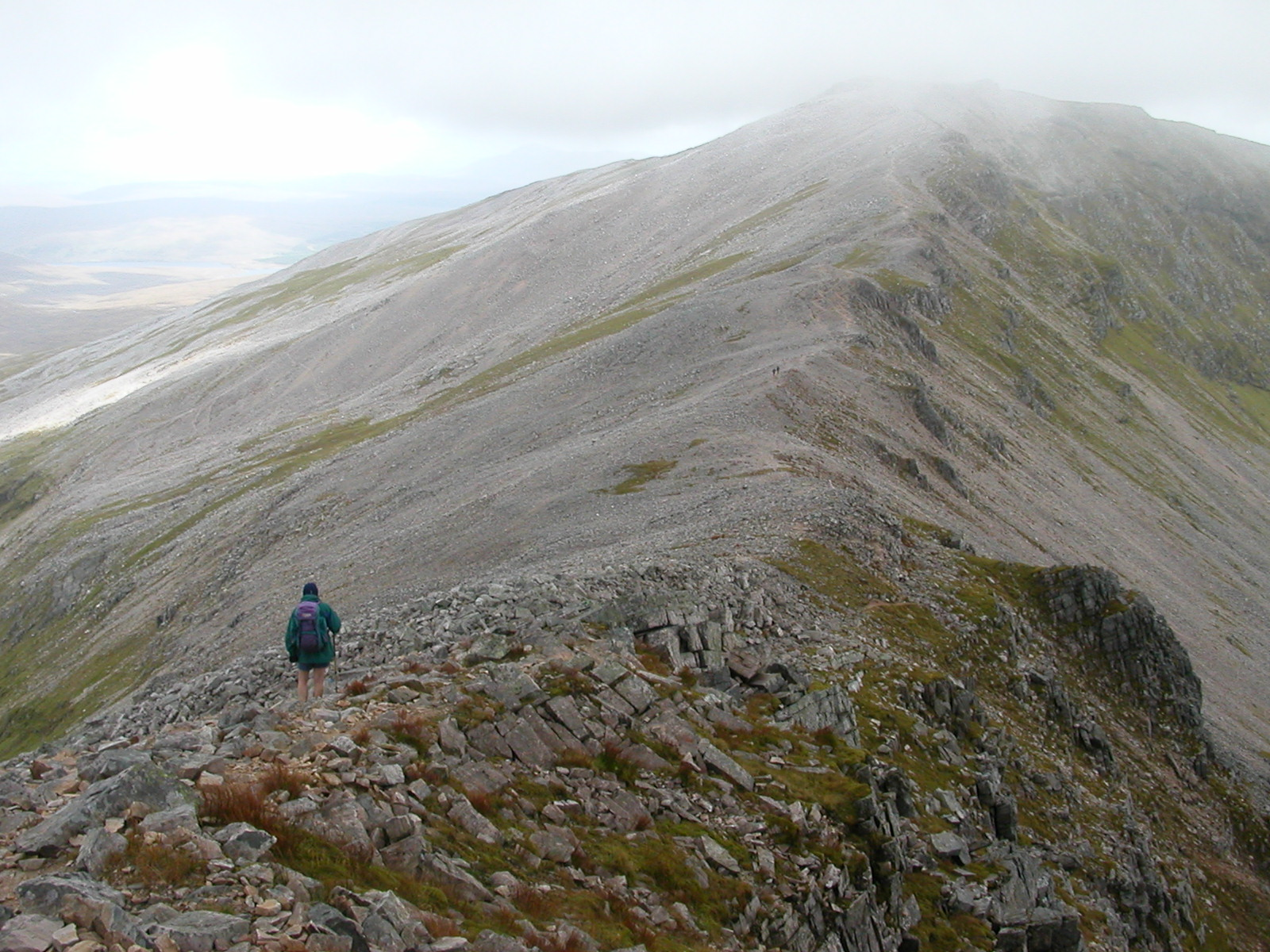
Ben More Assynt from Conival.

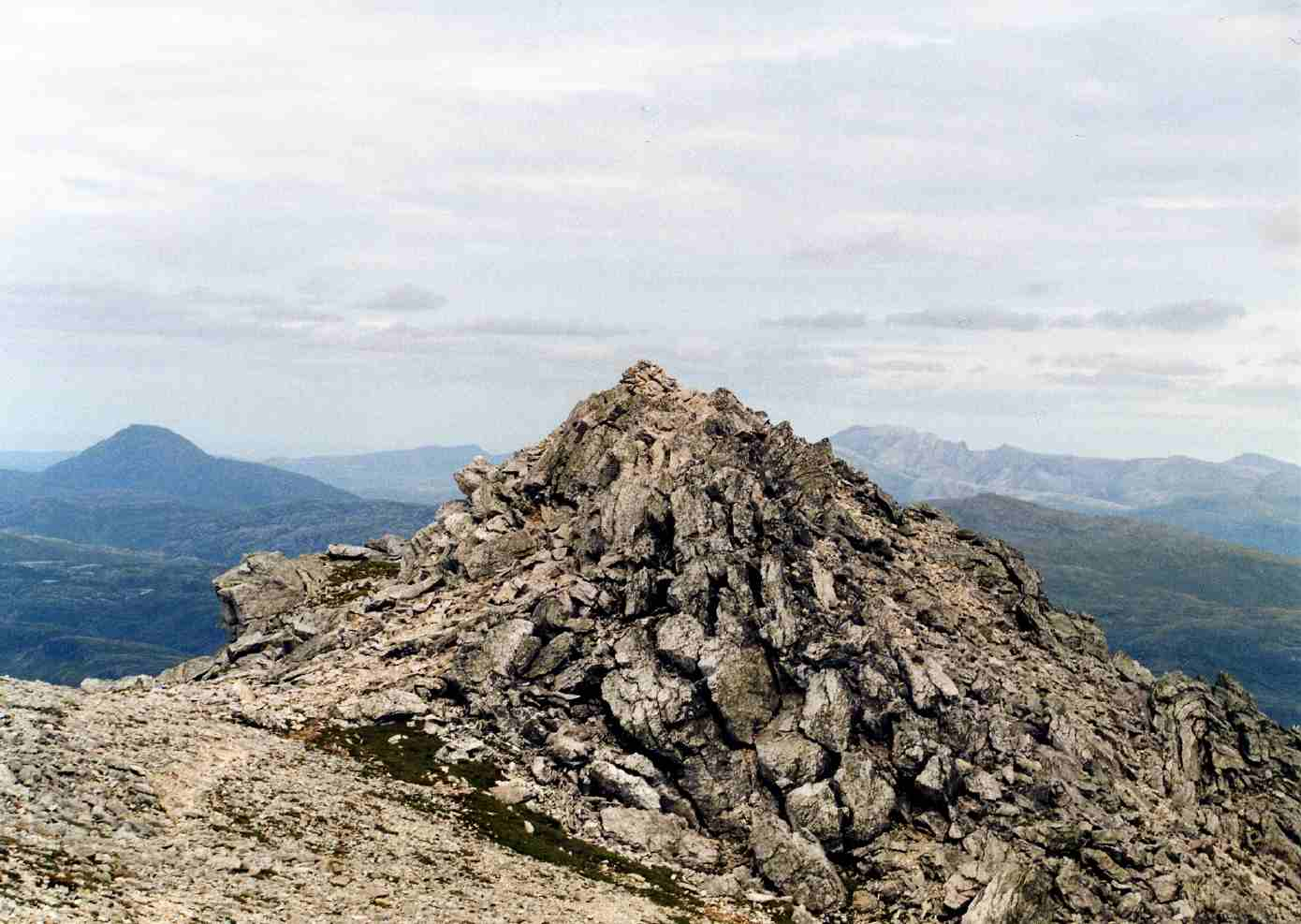
The shattered quartzite summit of Ben More Assynt.
