= River Oykel =

Coordinates: 57°58′N 4°44′W

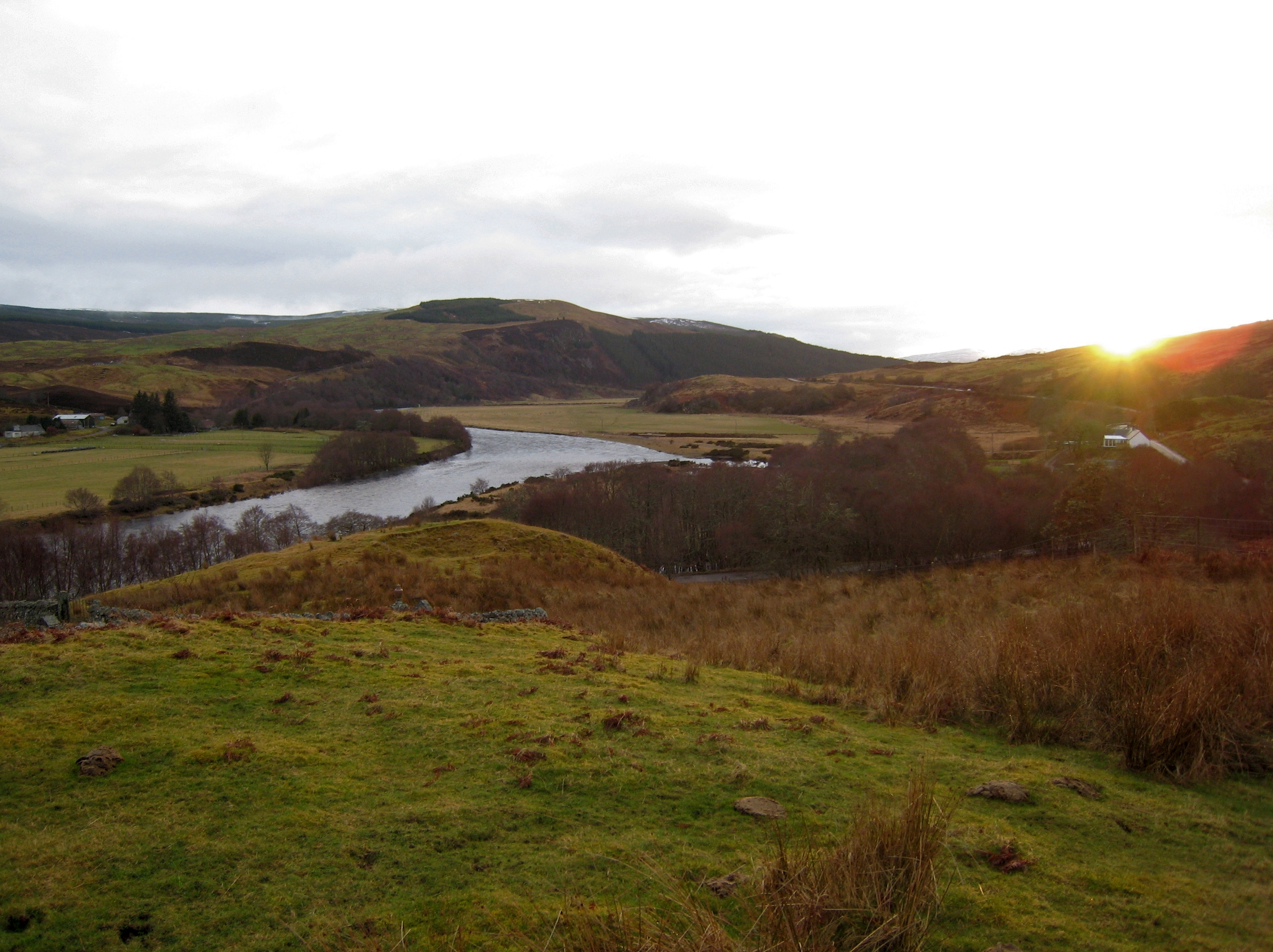
- Lower Oykel between Brae and Tuiteam house, halfway between Oykel Bridge and Invercassley. The Tutim Burn can just be seen.

Location
- Country: Scotland

Physical characteristics
- Source
  - location: Ben More Assynt, Sutherland
- Mouth
  - location: Kyle of Sutherland / Dornoch Firth
- Basin size: 355 km^{2} (137 sq mi)

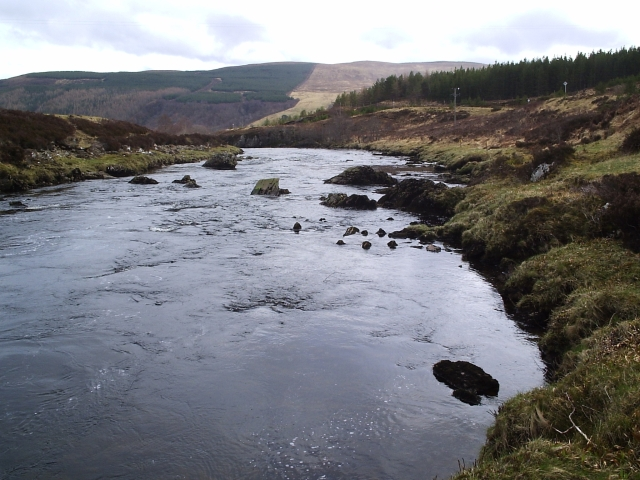
Looking downstream, near Oykel Bridge.

The River Oykel (Scottish Gaelic: Òiceall or Abhainn Òiceall, pronounced [ˈa.ɪɲ ˈɔːçkʲəl̪ˠ]) is a major river in northern Scotland that is famous for its salmon fishing. It rises on Ben More Assynt, a few miles from Ullapool on the west coast of Scotland, and drains into the North Sea via the Kyle of Sutherland. Traditionally it has marked the boundary between Ross (parish of Kincardine) to the south and Sutherland (parish of Creich) to the north.

== Etymology ==
The name Oykel is of uncertain derivation, but may be of Pictish origin. Firstly, this and other similar hydronyms may involve the element og, meaning "lively" (cf. River Ogwen, Wales), suffixed by the diminutive -ell. Secondly, Oykel may represent Pictish *ogel meaning "ridge", although long rivers are rarely named after minor local features. The hypothesis of a derivation from an equivalent of Welsh uchel has been suggested, but judged unlikely.

== Geography ==
The river rises at a height of 1,500 feet (460 metres) on the southern side of Ben More Assynt, and flows just over 35 miles (56 kilometres). The upper valley is known as Glen Oykel (Gleann Oiceall) and is mostly desolate moorland; the lower valley is known as Strath Oykel (Srath Oiceall). The A837 road runs along the river for most of its length, crossing it just above the junction with the Einig, about 6 miles (10 kilometres) west of Rosehall at Oykel Bridge. The eponymous hotel is famous among anglers, who are obliged to stay there when fishing the river.

The River Cassley feeds into the Oykel by Invercassley (Inbhir Charsla), forming the Kyle of Sutherland which is later joined by the River Shin and the River Carron. The Kyle discharges into the North Sea via the Dornoch Firth.

== History ==
The Oykel was known to the Vikings as the Ekkjal. It served as the boundary between the ancient Pictish province of Cat (Sutherland and Caithness), and the province of Ross, a role it continued until the two were merged into the Highland Region in 1975.

In 1406, the Mackays defeated the Clan MacLeod of Lewis at the Battle of Tuiteam Tarbhach on the north bank near the mouth of the Tutim Burn.

== Flora and fauna ==
It is designated as a Special Area of Conservation. It has abundant stocks of Atlantic salmon and over 1000 were caught by anglers in 2007.
