= River Shin =

River in northern Scotland

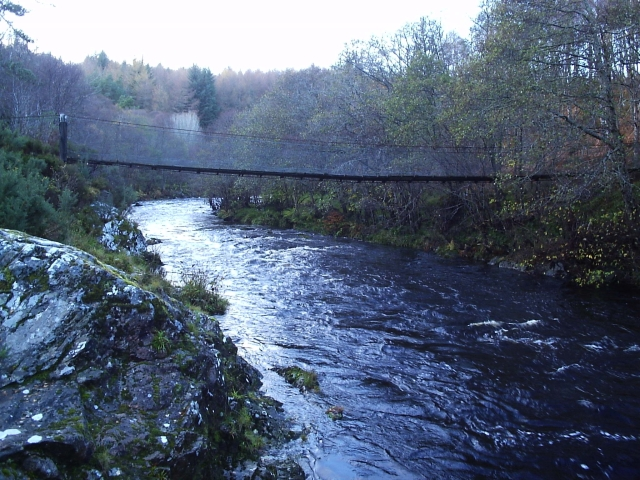
- A suspension bridge crosses the Shin below the Falls of Shin

- Location of the mouth within Scottish Highlands

Location
- Country: Scotland

Physical characteristics
- Source
  - location: Little Loch Shin weir
  - coordinates: 58.0128°N 4.4017°W
- Mouth
  - location: Kyle of Sutherland
  - coordinates: 57°56.14′N 4°24.8′W

The River Shin (Scottish Gaelic: Abhainn Sin, pronounced [ˈa.ɪɲ ˈʃin]) is a river in the Scottish North West Highlands.

The river flows from the southern end of Loch Shin, next to the village of Lairg. It flows in a generally southward direction, passing by Shin Forest and over the Falls of Shin. It joins the Kyle of Sutherland at Invershin, which then flows into the Dornoch Firth at Bonar Bridge and then the North Sea. The river is part of a larger network with several tributaries, but the part which is actually called the Shin is just 7 miles (11 km) long. There are several bridges on this section, a number of prehistoric remains on the banks, and the ruins of a corn mill at Gruid.

The river was extensively altered in the 1950s when the North of Scotland Hydro-Electric Board constructed Cassley power station on the banks of Loch Shin, Lairg power station at the southern end of Loch Shin, and Shin power station at Inveran, close to the mouth of the river. A large dam was built at Lairg, to increase the storage capacity of Loch Shin, and a smaller one just below Lairg to form Little Loch Shin, from where a tunnel runs to Inveran to feed the power station. Flow down the river has been increased by capturing some of the headwaters of the River Cassley to the west and the River Brora to the east.

The river is used by anglers, because it contains populations of game fish such as trout and salmon. Fishing is managed by the riparian landowners, and the river is divided into three beats, on which the number of fishing permits issued on any one day is strictly limited. Fish lifts were built into the dams to allow migrating salmon to pass upstream into the rivers beyond Loch Shin, but survival rates for smolts which hatch in the upper reaches are small, and a catch and release policy has been implemented, to attempt to improve dwindling stocks of game fish. Habitat improvements have also been carried out, to provide spawning grounds for salmon and to increase the population of freshwater pearl mussels, which clean the water.

== Route ==
The River Shin is fed by a number of streams and rivers which rise to the north and north-west of Lairg. Loch Dudb a' Chuail is located on the southern slopes of Meallan a' Chuail, a small mountain of 2,460 feet (750 m). Water from it flows along the Abhain a Choire ("Corrie River") past the settlement of Corriekinloch to reach the north-west end of Loch Shin. Loch Merkland is fed by a number of streams rising in the mountains, including the Garbh Allt, which flows eastwards to reach the western bank of the loch. It covers 430 acres (174 ha) and its surface is 377 feet (115 m) above Ordnance datum (AOD). The short Merkland River joins it to Loch a' Ghriama, which covers 270 acres (109 ha) and is at 318 feet (97 m) AOD. A narrow channel crossed by a bridge carrying a minor road joins it to Loch Shin.

Loch Shin is around 17 miles (27 km) long with a maximum depth of 162 feet (49 m). It covers 8,138 acres (3,293 ha) and its surface level is 312 feet (95 m) AOD. The level was raised by 35 feet (11 m) when the dam at its southern end was built, and so its surface area is also larger than it was. A short way along the loch on its south-western shore is Cassley power station, which discharges water collected from the headwaters of the River Cassley into the loch. This supply passes under Moavally mountain through a tunnel. The River Fiag enters the loch at Fiag Bridge, which carries the A838 road over its mouth. The river flows southwards along the narrow Glen Fiag from Loch Fiag, which collects water from a number of streams. The loch covers 363 acres (147 ha) and its surface is 650 feet (198 m) AOD.

As Loch Shin continues to the south-east, there is a promontary known as The Airde which is attached to the north-east bank. At its tip, near the disused Shinness Quarry, there are a number of prehistoric remains, including several hut circles. The next tributary to enter Loch Shin is the River Tirry, which rises to the south-east of Loch Fiag, and flows down the wide Strath Tirry, to the west of the A836 road. It is joined by two of its own tributaries, which rise to the east of the road. The first is the Abhainn Sgeamhaidh, which is crossed by the A836 at Rhian Bridge, near the hamlet of Rhian. The bridge has a single arch and is made of rubble. The second is the Feith Osdail, which flows from the east. Its flow has been augmented by the construction of a weir at Dalnessie on the River Brora, which diverts the headwaters of that river into the Feith Osdail. The weir and interconnecting channal were constructed as part of the Shin hydro-electric scheme. Close to its junction with the River Tirry, the river is crossed by the A838 road at Feith Osdail bridge. This is a single span rubble bridge designed by Thomas Telford and constructed around 1815, as part of his project to build the Parliamentary road from Bonar Bridge to Tongue, completed in 1819. Just before the Tirry enters Loch Shin, it is crossed by a bridge carrying the A838 road, near the settlement of Tirryside.

At the southern end of Loch Shin lie the dam and power station which were constructed in the 1950s, and which raised the level of the loch. The architecture is of a high quality with a prominent copper roof, as the structures form a focal point for the village of Lairg. Below the dam is Little Loch Shin, which is immediately to the west of Lairg. It is crossed part way down by the A839 road, and ends at the dam, from which water enters a tunnel to feed the power station at Inveran, and compensation water is released to maintain the flow on the River Shin.

=== Achany Glen ===
The River Shin properly starts at the weir or dam at the lower end of Little Loch Shin. A short distance below the dam, a prehistoric stone circle stands on the right bank. The river continues to the south and is crossed by a pedestrian suspension bridge. Soon the river flows over a weir, which runs diagonally across the river. There is an island near the right bank, formed by the leat running to the west of it which formerly supplied Gruids Mill, parts of which are still in situ. Close to the point at which the leat rejoins the river, early maps show a corn mill and a saw mill. Further downstream is the Falls of Shin, a waterfall which has a major impact on fish migration.

There is a poorly preserved prehistoric hut circle on the right bank of the river. The hut is around 36 feet (11 m) in diameter, but there is no obvious evidence of associated land use. Shortly afterwards, the Grudie Burn joins on the right bank, after it has passed through the single-arched Achany Bridge, which carries the B864 road. This section of the Shin valley is known as the Achany Glen. At Inveran, the river is crossed by two bridges, the oldest dating from around 1830. It has three arches, with the centre arch being taller than the outside arches. It was bypassed by a newer bridge when the A837 road was realigned. On the right bank is Inveran power station, supplied with water by a tunnel from Little Loch Shin. It has a copper roof, sculpted panels showing mythical Celtic beasts, and a panel showing "Shin Power Station". The outfall from the station is a little further downstream, where there is a dam which prevents migrating fish from entering the station. The Shin then joins the Kyle of Sutherland. Near the junction on the left bank is Invershin farm and salmon station. The buildings date from the early 19th century, and include a boiling house and two ice houses. Salmon were par-boiled and despatched to market initially by sea and later by railway.

== Hydro-electric development ==
The Shin hydro-electric scheme was implemented by the North of Scotland Hydro-Electric Board. After the board was created in 1943, they produced a list of 102 projects which they thought could be built, from small ones to huge ones involving several neighbouring glens, including that for the Shin. The scheme has a catchment area of around 250 square miles (650 km^{2}) in an area where the average yearly rainfall is 60 inches (1,500 mm) and the total head is around 265 feet (81 m). These figures are considerably smaller than for many of the Board's other schemes, but the local population was fairly small and scattered, and so the capacity of the system was consequently lower. Plans to implement the scheme were published in 1951, and it became the 32nd constructional scheme promoted by the Board. Parliamentary approval to proceed was received in the summer of 1953, after lengthy negotiations, and George Wimpey & Co began work on the contract in 1954.

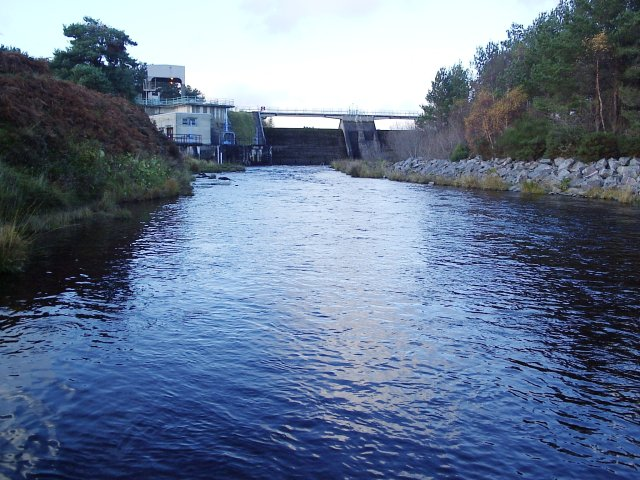
The start of the River Shin, just below the dam on Little Loch Shin

The scheme was the most northerly on the Scottish mainland of those implemented by the Board. It involved constructing a concrete gravity and earthfill dam across the river at the southern end of Loch Shin, which raised the level of the loch by 35 feet (11 m). The dam is 1,740 feet (530 m) long and 66 feet (20 m) high. It required 40,000 cubic yards (31,000 m^{3}) of concrete and 76,000 cubic yards (58,000 m^{3}) of earth to complete it. The consulting engineers for the construction were Sir Murdoch MacDonald and Partners. The dam is used to release compensation water to maintain flows in the river below, and that water is fed through a 3.5MW vertical Kaplan turbine which is built into the dam. The water first passes into Little Loch Shin, a small reservoir immediately below the dam. Its level is controlled by a weir at the downstream end, but much of the water passes into a long tunnel, which carries it to the Shin power station at Inveran, located on the west bank of the River Shin close to its junction with the Kyle of Sutherland. Additional water enters the tunnel from the Grudie Burn, and the tunnel feeds water to two horizontal Francis turbines, each of which was connected to a 12MW generator. On exit from the power station, the water passes back into the Shin.

The Lairg dam has a fixed spillway in the centre, with higher parapet walls to either side. There is a lower spillway at the north-east end of the dam, with gates to control its operation. The power station building is a two-storey design, integrated into the dam wall, and faced with random rubble. The architect for the design was James Shearer, and architectural details include carved panels and armorials. In common with many of their projects, the engineers were responsible for the functional form of the buildings, but the architect decided on their appearance and style. This led to a style which was called vernacular modernism, and reflected the attempt to ensure that the buildings harmonised with the landscape.

To ensure that migrating salmon could still reach their spawning grounds on the upper river, a fish screen at Inveran stops them from entering the tail race of the power station. Borland fish lifts are installed at the Little Loch Shin weir and the Lairg dam. The flow in the river is maintained by releasing compensation water from the weir, but even this is used to generate electricity, as the water passes through a small turbine built into the weir. It was one of the first uses of a "compensation set" in the country. This part of the scheme was completed in 1959, although the dam and weir were ready for impounding of water to begin in January 1956.

The scheme included another power station on the banks of Loch Shin. Cassley power station is fed by water collected from the headwaters of the River Cassley, which runs parallel to Loch Shin, but further to the west. 5 miles (8 km) of new road were required to access the site, because of its remoteness. A pipeline to the west of the river collects water from the Allt a' Chnaip Ghiubhais and the Allt Loch Carn nan Conbhairean, while one to the east collects water from the Allt Moavally. The pipes feed into a headpond, created by building Duchally weir. From there, the water passes through two small turbines to enter a tunnel which carries it beneath Moavally, a hill of 1,677 feet (511 m), to the western shore of Loch Shin. Cassley power station has two turbines, capable of generating a total of 10MW, and was used to feed the area around Durness in the far north west of Scotland. The power station was completed in July 1960. There is also a single turbine at Duchally weir, which operates automatically controlled by the water level. The feed from the turbine rises upwards, and then descends again into the water. Only when the water level is high enough to pass over the invert does water reach the turbine.

The flow into Loch Shin is augmented by some of the headwaters of the River Brora, to the east of Loch Shin. A weir near the Dalnessie Estate diverts water into an aqueduct, which discharges into the upper reaches of the Feith Osdail, a tributary of the River Tirry, which flows into Loch Shin. Another aqueduct captures some of the flow in the upper tributaries of the River Vagastie to the west of Vagastie Bridge on the A836 road, and diverts the water into the Allt an Locha Ghaineamhaich, close to Loch Gaineamhach. This is also a tributary of the River Tirry.

== Fishing ==
The Shin is popular with anglers for game fishing, as it contains stocks of salmon and trout. Unlike many rivers in Scotland, where water levels are too low for fishing in the summer months, the Shin can be fished throughout the summer, as water levels are maintained by compensation water released from the hydro-electric dams. In Scotland, all rivers which can be fished for salmon are divided up into beats, which are lengths of river, usually between 2 and 3 miles (3.2 and 4.8 km) long, for which the riparian landowner issues a limited number of permits for each day. Scotland does not have a national rod licence scheme, and only a permit from the riparian owner is required to go fishing. The riparian owner for the upper Shin from the Lairg dam almost to the Falls of Shin is the Lairg Estate. This is 3.5 miles (5.6 km) long and is divided into two beats, on which four permits per day are issued. There are 32 named pools where fishing can take place. The Falls of Shin are some 12 feet (3.7 m) high, and fish will not normally ascend them until May when the water becomes warmer. The salmon fishing season consequently does not start until the end of May, and ends at the end of September. Most of the trout caught on the river are caught between April and June.

The Shin descends by 270 feet (82 m) over the 7 miles (11 km) from Little Loch Shin dam to its mouth, and most of the drop occurs in the final mile (1.6 km), where the river tumbles over large rocks, making fishing a challenging sport. The lower Shin is managed as a single beat of 1.5 miles (2.4 km).

A long term scientific study has taken place on the Shin to look at the life cycle of the Atlantic salmon. Smolts have been caught and tagged with a passive integrated transponder, to calculate survival rates as they attempt to exit from Loch Shin through the hydro-electric dams. This showed that less than 10 percent of the smolts survived, a proportion that is not sustainable in the long term. In consultation with the Kyle of Sutherland District Fishery Board and the Scottish Environmental Protection Agency, the proprietors of the river have designated it as a catch and release river, where all fish caught should be released again, in order to improve the health of the salmon population. The Fishery Board maintains a hatchery, but salmon are not released to enhance the fishery, as there is growing evidence that this is not effective and may be harmful. Conservation of the stock and enhancements to their habitat are more effective ways of improving the salmon population.

Work has been carried out on the Shin to improve the habitat for freshwater pearl mussels. These are particularly beneficial to the fish populations, because each adult filters up to 50 litres (11 imp gal; 13 US gal) of water per day, keeping it clear for the benefit of other species. Since the construction of the hydro-electric dams, the transport of sediment downstream from the dams has changed, resulting in less habitat for the mussels and for spawning salmon. A project to create new habitat at four sites was carried out in October 2022. This involved constructing eleven large wooden structures and the addition of new gravel to the river bed. Once the work was finished, monitoring of the sites was carried out to understand their effectiveness and to identify maintenance requirements.

== Bibliography ==
- Miller, James (2002). The Dam Builders - Power from the Glens. Birlinn. ISBN 978-1-84158-225-2.
- Payne, Peter L (1988). The Hydro. Aberdeen University Press. ISBN 978-0-08-036584-8.
