= Dornoch Firth Bridge =

Bridge in Highland, Scotland

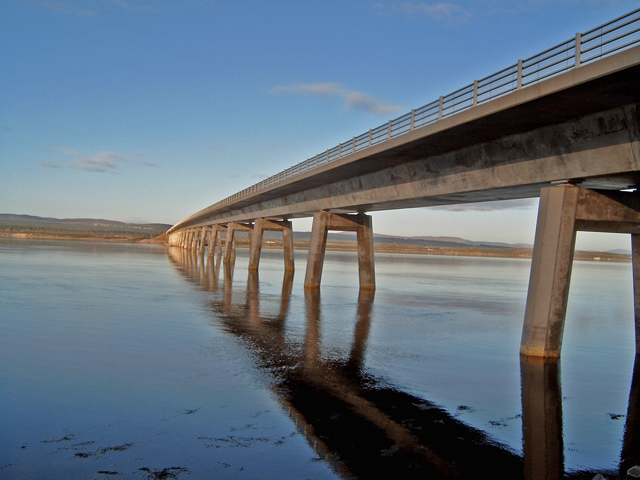
- Bridge crossing the Dornoch Firth
- Coordinates: 57.844°N 4.11°W
- OS grid reference: NH747852
- Carries: A9 , two footways, two cycle tracks
- Crosses: Dornoch Firth
- Locale: Tain
- Other name: Dornoch Bridge

Characteristics
- Design: Prestressed box girder on inclined leg portals
- Material: Concrete
- Total length: 892 metres (2,927 ft)
- Width: 13.2 metres (43 ft)
- No. of spans: 21

History
- Designer: Christiani & Nielsen; Sir Alexander Gibb & Partners; Tony Gee & Partners
- Construction start: Late 1989
- Construction cost: £13.5 million
- Opened: August 1991
- Inaugurated: 27 August 1991
- Replaces: Round-trip via Bonar Bridge

Location
- Interactive map of Dornoch Firth Bridge

The Dornoch Firth Bridge is a road bridge over the Dornoch Firth, carrying traffic between Tain and Dornoch.

== History ==
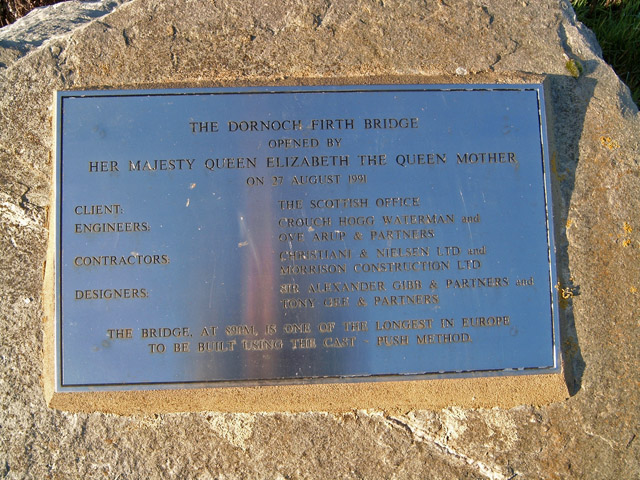
Plaque for the bridge's opening in 1991

It was built for the Scottish Office. There had been recent substantial improvements of the A9 between Inverness and Tain, including the cable-stayed Kessock Bridge at Inverness in 1982. The Dornoch Bridge was to be the final link in the chain. Tenders were open to bid from 1986, and 40 companies showed an interest in the contract. Ove Arup and Crouch Hogg Waterman of Glasgow produced a set of initial design parameters for companies to build. The joint-venture chosen to build the bridge put in a quote for £9.5 million, and won the contract in early 1988. There were proposals that the bridge should be constructed so as to allow the Far North railway line to benefit from the shorter route as well, with the potential for up to 45 minutes to be saved on the journey between Inverness and Thurso/Wick. However this part of the scheme failed to secure government funding, and so only a road bridge was built.

=== Design ===
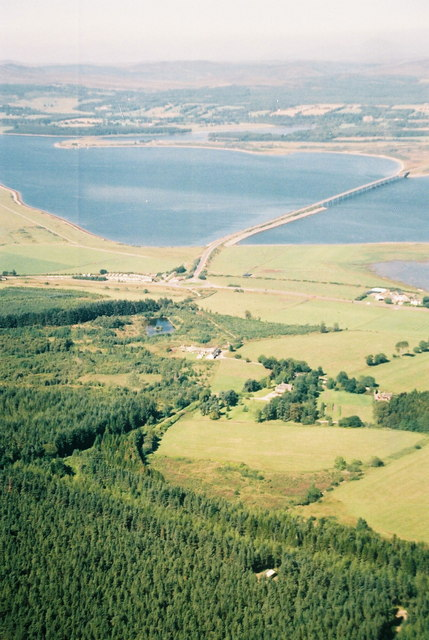
Aerial view in August 2004

Each of the 21 spans is about 44 metres (144 ft) long. The Project Manager was Nigel Beaney of Christiani & Nielsen. Prestressed concrete rather than steel was chosen as the material to improve the life of the bridge. The design had to be approved by the Royal Fine Art Commission for Scotland.

== Construction ==
It was built by a joint venture of Christiani & Nielsen and Morrison Construction. It cost £13.5 million (£31 million current value). At the time it was one of the longest bridges in Europe built with the cast-and-push method, or incremental launch.

The bridge deck was built in a temporary factory 20 metres (66 ft) south of the southern end of the bridge. Each section of the bridge was pushed with 600 tonnes (590 long tons; 660 short tons) of hydraulic force over PTFE bearings on the top of the bridge supports. The launch nose section had a light steel composition to reduce the cantilever moment as it was inched over an open span. Each deck section was constructed as around 21 metres (69 ft) in length – half a span. The concrete used welded mat reinforcement. The pre-stressing of each section had 38 Macalloy bar tendons of 40 mm (1.6 in) thickness. The sections would be cast on a Monday morning and pushed on a Friday, this later being on a Thursday. Each deck section weighed around 14,000 tonnes (13,780 long tons; 15,430 short tons).

== Opening ==
The bridge was opened by The Queen Mother on Tuesday, 27 August 1991. It replaced, via a roundabout with the A836 to the south and a road junction with the A949 to the north, the 26-mile (42 km) round trip over Bonar Bridge.

== See also ==
- Cromarty Bridge, further to the south.
- List of bridges in Scotland
