= River Carron, Sutherland =

River in the Highlands of Scotland

Coordinates: 57.89327°N 4.36054°W

The River Carron (Scottish Gaelic: Carrann) is an east coast river in Sutherland, in the Highlands of Scotland.

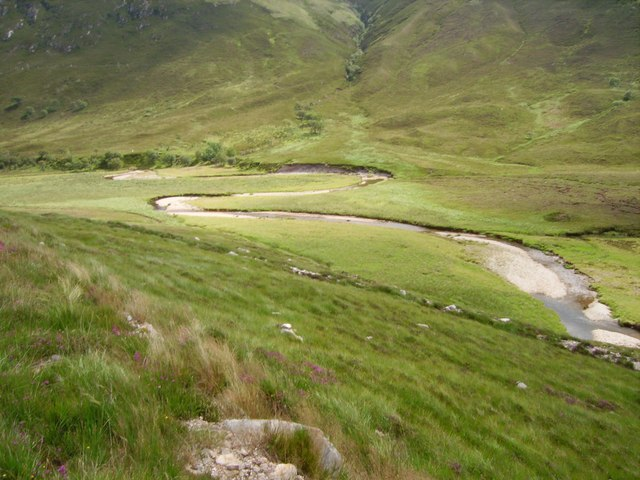
Meanders in Alladale River

It begins as Abhainn a' Ghlinne Mhòir, which joins with the Alladale River (Scottish Gaelic: Abhainn Alladail) to form the River Carron. Further downstream, tributaries include the Water of Glencalvie and the Black Water. The River Carron flows down through Strathcarron, then into the Kyle of Sutherland near Bonar Bridge.

The River Carron is used for kayaking and salmon fishing.

It flows through the centre of the civil parish of Kincardine and Community council or Ardgay and District.
