= Kyle of Sutherland =

Estuary in the Scottish Highlands

Coordinates: 57°54′20″N 4°22′39″W

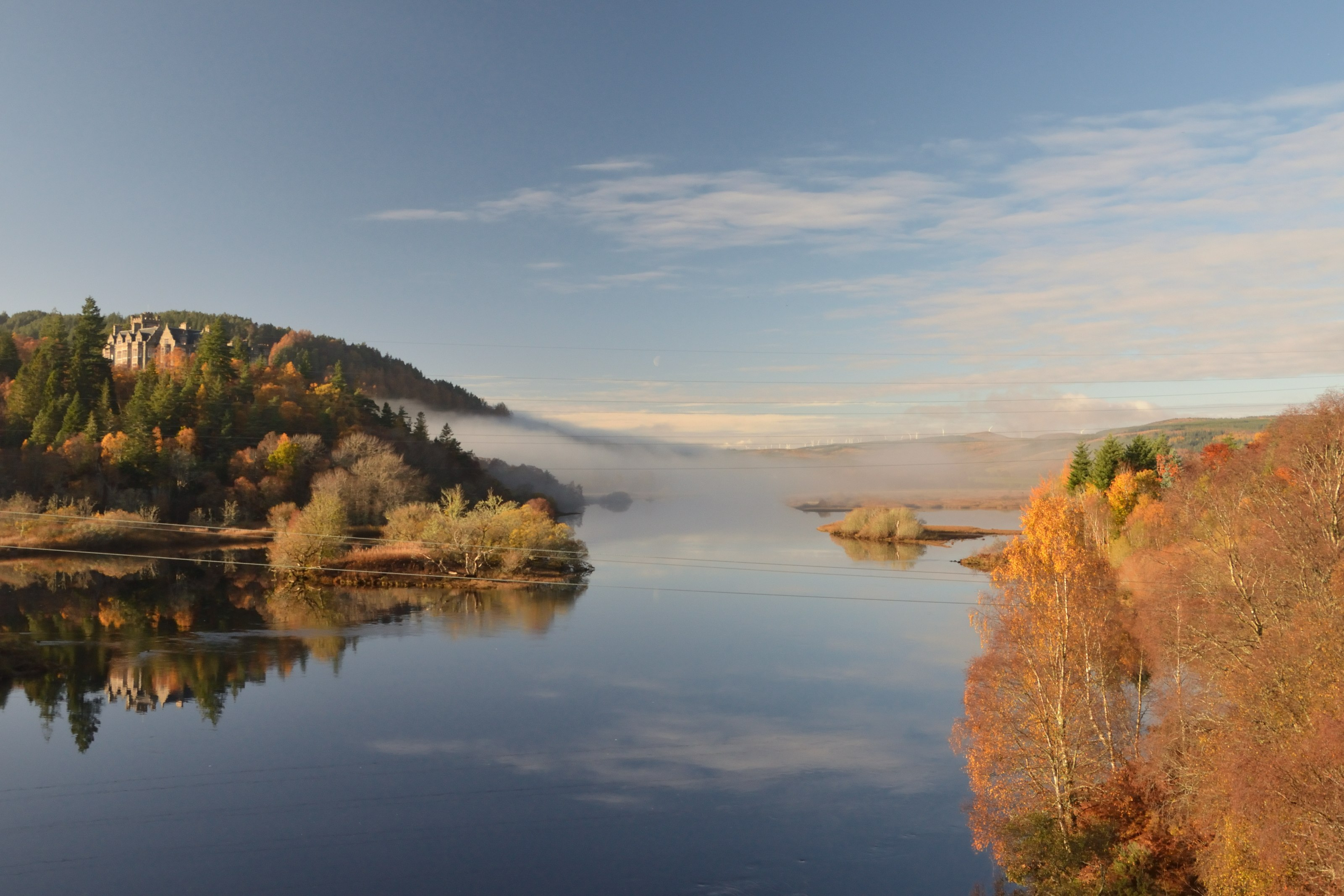
Carbisdale Castle overlooking the Kyle

The Kyle of Sutherland (Scottish Gaelic: An Caol Catach) is an estuary in the Scottish Highlands formed by the rivers Oykel and Cassley. It extends from the confluence of these rivers to Bonar Bridge, some 10 miles (16 km) downstream, where it widens to become the Dornoch Firth. Along its way, it is joined by the rivers Shin and Carron. It forms part of the traditional boundary between Ross-shire and Sutherland.

== 1892 flooding ==
The first Bonar Bridge was built in 1812 after the Battle of Culloden; it was engineered by Thomas Telford. Eighty years later, the bridge was swept away by a flood on 29 January 1892, a winter of many great floods in the North of Scotland. It has been suggested that this event was predicted by the Brahan Seer.
