= Creich, Sutherland =

Coordinates: 57°52′N 4°17′W

Creich
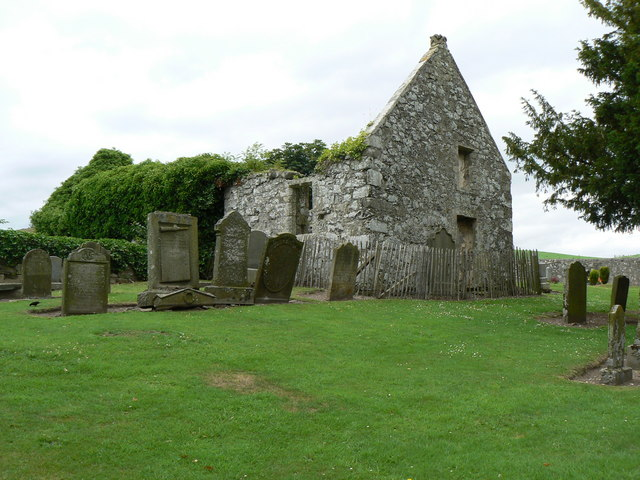
- Old Creich Church

- Location within the Highland council area
- Civil parish: Creich
- Council area: Highland
- Country: Scotland
- Sovereign state: United Kingdom
- Police: Scotland
- Fire: Scottish
- Ambulance: Scottish

Creich (Scottish Gaelic: Craoich, pronounced [kʰɾɯːç]) is a substantial parish on the north side of the Dornoch Firth the largest settlement being Bonar Bridge. It lies in Sutherland, Highland, Scotland.

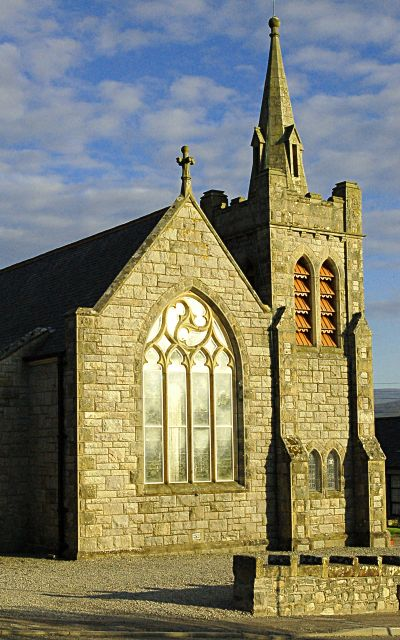
Creich Church

There is a church (now in ruins) and graveyard for the Parish of Creich. Creich Mains farm is located here.

Beside the old (walled) graveyard in a field there is a standing stone engraved with a faint Celtic-style Christian cross. This is associated with a battle between locals and Norsemen/Vikings.

There is a rocky hill forming a peninsula into the Kyle of Sutherland called Dun Creich (the "hill of Creich"), which has the ruins of a vitrified fort on its summit.

== Notable residents ==
Unusually for such a tiny parish, it has created two church leaders:

Very Rev Gustavus Aird (1813-1898) minister of Creich, Moderator of the General Assembly of the Free Church of Scotland in 1888, active campaigner against the Highland Clearances

Very Rev Archibald Donald Cameron was minister of Creich from 1908 to 1946 and Moderator of the General Assembly of the Free Church of Scotland 1928/29.
