= Dornoch Firth =

Scottish firth

Dornoch Firth National Scenic Area
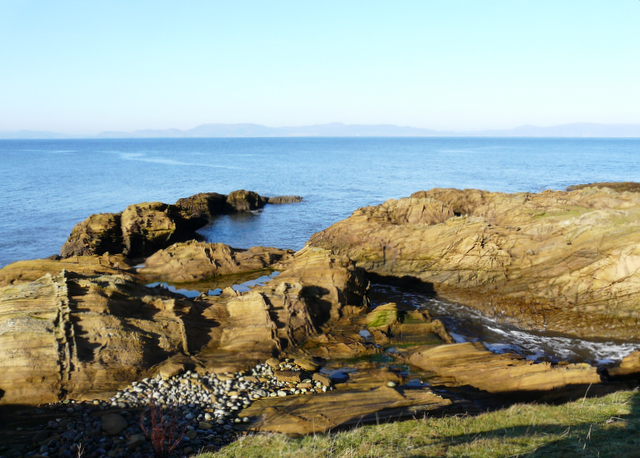
- Shoreline looking across Dornoch Firth

- Location within Highland
- Location: Highland, Scotland
- Coordinates: 57°51′N 4°03′W
- Area: 40 km^{2} (15 sq mi)
- Established: 1981
- Governing body: NatureScot

Ramsar Wetland
- Official name: Dornoch Firth and Loch Fleet
- Designated: 24 March 1997
- Reference no.: 897

The Dornoch Firth (Scottish Gaelic: Caolas Dhòrnaich, pronounced [ˈkɯːl̪ˠəs̪ ˈɣɔːrˠn̪ˠɪç]) is a firth on the east coast of Highland, in northern Scotland.

== Location ==
The Dornoch Firth forms part of the boundary between Ross and Cromarty, to the south, and Sutherland, to the north. The firth is designated as a national scenic area, one of 40 such areas in Scotland. The national scenic area covers 15,782 ha (60.9 sq mi) in total, of which 4,240 ha (16.4 sq mi) is the marine area of the firth below low tide. A review of the national scenic areas by Scottish Natural Heritage in 2010 commented:

By comparison with other east coast firths the Dornoch Firth is narrow and sinuous, yet it exhibits within its compass a surprising variety of landscapes. It is enclosed by abrupt rounded granitic hills clad in heather moor and scree, their Gaelic names of cnoc, meall and creag giving the clue to their character. Their lower slopes are frequently wooded, oakwoods being a noticeable feature of the area, but with other deciduous and coniferous species represented in plantations which vary from the policy plantings of Skibo Castle to the pines of the Struie Forest.

— SNH

Together with Loch Fleet it is a designated as a Special Protection Area (SPA) for wildlife conservation purposes. Additionally, together with Morrich More, it has the designation of Special Area of Conservation (SAC).

The total SPA hosts significant populations of the following birds:

- Breeding season: osprey (Pandion haliaetus)
- Overwintering: bar-tailed godwit (Limosa lapponica), greylag goose (Anser anser), wigeon (Anas penelope), curlew (Numenius arquata), dunlin (Calidris alpina alpina), oystercatcher (Haematopus ostralegus), and teal (Anas crecca).

The SAC protects a variety of habitats, including salt meadows and coastal dune heathland and grassland. The site is of importance for otters (Lutra lutra) and harbour seals (Phoca vitulina)

== Crossing the firth ==
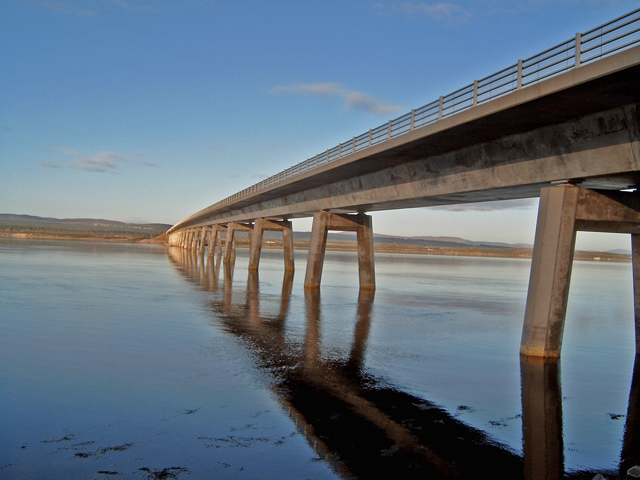
Dornoch Firth Bridge (west side, 2006)

In 1991, the firth was bridged, the new Dornoch Firth Bridge providing a shorter route on the A9 road between Inverness and Thurso; until then traffic had to go by way of Bonar Bridge at the head of the inlet. There were proposals that the bridge should be constructed so as to allow the Far North railway line to also benefit from the shorter route, with the potential for up to 45 minutes to be saved on the journey between Inverness and Thurso/Wick. However this part of the scheme failed to secure government funding, and so only a road bridge was built.

On 16 August 1809 the firth was the scene of the Meikle Ferry disaster when an over-laden ferryboat sank with the loss of 99 lives.
