= Achairn Burn =

Coordinates: 58.3635°N 3.2468°W

Achairn Burn, known also as Haster Burn, is one of the major tributaries of Wick River, in Caithness, in the Highland area of Scotland. The burn's source is in headwaters flowing from the northern slope of the Hill of Toftgunn, which rises to over 170 metres, and in Camster Loch, which is at nearly 120 metres, between the Hill of Toftgunn and Ballharn Hill. The same area feeds also another major tributary of Wick River, the Camster/Rowans-Strath Burn. Achairn Burn enters Wick River at Mary Ford, about 10 kilometres to the northeast of the burn's source. Its entire course is within Caithness, as is the whole of the catchment basin of Wick River.

Between its source and Maryford the burn's course describes a sort of reversed S-shape, flowing generally north, then turning east and east/southeast before turning north again. On its banks the burn has Upper Achairn, Lower Achairn, Puldagon, and Haster. Between Upper Achairn and Lower Achairn the burn receives water from Allt Beag-airighe (Burn of the Small Shieling). In the Puldagon area it is bridged by a small, single-track road linking the A882 road, near the Bridge of Haster, with the A99 road in the Thrumster area. The Bridge of Haster carries the A882 itself, about 3 kilometres west of Wick and about one kilometre south of Maryford.

== Grid references ==
Grid references are generally in order from source to Maryford:

- Hill of Toftgunn: ND271423
- Ballharn Hill: ND245438
- Camster Loch: ND265443
- Upper Achairn: ND276475
- Allt Beag-airighe: ND281484
- Lower Achairn: ND298498
- Puldagon: ND325488
- Haster: ND326505
- Bridge of Haster: ND327512
- Mary Ford: ND325522
