= Loch Burn, Watten =

Waterway in Scotland

Coordinates: 58°28′36″N 3°17′13″W

Loch Burn is a stream that flows out of the eastern end of Loch Watten in Caithness, in the Highland area of Scotland, at a height of around 17 metres (55 ft) and about one kilometre north/northeast of the village of Watten. Less than a kilometre east of its source at Loch Watten the burn flows into Wick River.
