= List of listed buildings in Comrie, Perth and Kinross =

This is a list of listed buildings in the parish of Comrie in Perth and Kinross, Scotland.

== List ==
Name	Location	Date Listed	Grid Ref. (Note: Sometimes known as OSGB36, the grid reference (where provided) is based on the British national grid reference system used by the Ordnance Survey. • "Guide to National Grid". Ordnance Survey. • "Get-a-map". Ordnance Survey.)	Geo-coordinates	Notes	LB Number (Note: Historic Environment Scotland assign a unique alphanumeric identifier to each designated site in Scotland, for listed buildings this always begins with "LB", for example "LB12345".)	Image
20, 22 And Kinfauns, Burrel Street				56°22′29″N 3°59′37″W	Category C(S)	6198	Upload Photo
Drummond Street, Mitchell's Building				56°22′29″N 3°59′11″W	Category C(S)	6200	Upload Photo
Ardvorlich, The Haugh, Bridge Over Ardvorlich Burn				56°22′53″N 4°12′55″W	Category C(S)	6212	Upload Photo
Ardvorlich, The Haugh, Mcdonald Of Glencoe Stone				56°22′53″N 4°12′56″W	Category C(S)	6214	Upload Photo
Flowerdale, Dalginross				56°22′09″N 3°59′01″W	Category C(S)	5308	Upload Photo
Melville Monument Dunmore House				56°23′14″N 3°59′58″W	Category B	5321	Upload another image See more images
Assynt, Drummond Street				56°22′30″N 3°59′15″W	Category C(S)	5332	Upload Photo
War Memorial Institute Bridgend, Dalginross				56°22′23″N 3°59′14″W	Category C(S)	5348	Upload Photo
Glenpark House, Monument Road				56°22′33″N 3°59′31″W	Category C(S)	5364	Upload Photo
West End Tearoom, 1 Burrell Street				56°22′32″N 3°59′32″W	Category C(S)	5367	Upload Photo
Smiddy House, (Wilson) Formerly Occupied By Young And Carson, Dunira Street				56°22′26″N 3°59′20″W	Category B	5387	Upload Photo
Property Occupied By Brough & Mcpherson, Mitchell & Thomson, And Smith, Also Miss Findlay, Dunira St				56°22′27″N 3°59′17″W	Category A	5393	Upload another image See more images
Hotel Property, East Side Of Melville Square And Lane				56°22′28″N 3°59′16″W	Category B	5395	Upload Photo
Hollandbush, Dundas Street				56°22′29″N 3°59′27″W	Category C(S)	5404	Upload Photo
Benyhone, Dundas Street				56°22′30″N 3°59′28″W	Category C(S)	5410	Upload Photo
St Fillans, Drummond Arms Hotel With Outbuildings				56°23′29″N 4°06′54″W	Category C(S)	5299	Upload Photo
Comrie, Cultybraggan Former Cadet Camp, Huts 19 And 20 (Guard's Block) And 44, 45, 46				56°21′22″N 3°59′39″W	Category A	50471	Upload another image
Comrie, Cultybraggan Former Cadet Camp, Huts 1-3, 21, 29-39, 47-57 (All Nos Inclusive)				56°21′24″N 3°59′41″W	Category B	50472	Upload another image See more images
Burrell Street And Dundas Street, Comrie And Strowan Parish Church				56°22′29″N 3°59′33″W	Category C(S)	6197	Upload Photo
Drummond Street, Ancaster Arms Hotel				56°22′29″N 3°59′10″W	Category C(S)	6199	Upload Photo
Aberuchill Walled Garden				56°21′54″N 4°02′01″W	Category C(S)	6209	Upload Photo
Craigroyston And Dunalistair, Dalginross				56°22′10″N 3°59′03″W	Category C(S)	5303	Upload Photo
Laurelbank Dalginross				56°22′12″N 3°59′03″W	Category C(S)	5306	Upload Photo
Campfield, Dalginross				56°22′06″N 3°59′06″W	Category C(S)	5310	Upload Photo
Larig Llidh And Dunvegan Camp Road				56°22′12″N 3°59′06″W	Category C(S)	5313	Upload Photo
Four Hollies Barrack Road				56°22′14″N 3°58′59″W	Category C(S)	5315	Upload Photo
Property Occupied By James Innes & R W Smith, Drummond Street				56°22′30″N 3°59′12″W	Category C(S)	5330	Upload Photo
Whin Cottage And Mossbank, Dundas Street				56°22′31″N 3°59′30″W	Category C(S)	5361	Upload Photo
Westview, Dundas Street				56°22′32″N 3°59′31″W	Category C(S)	5362	Upload Photo
Cottage Occupied By Miss Carmichael, Monument Road				56°22′33″N 3°59′32″W	Category C(S)	5365	Upload Photo
Simonside And Ainslie Cottage, Burrell Street				56°22′31″N 3°59′32″W	Category C(S)	5370	Upload Photo
Public Hall, Burrel Street				56°22′29″N 3°59′37″W	Category B	5373	Upload Photo
Library And Comrie Dundas Centre, Drummond Street				56°22′32″N 3°59′07″W	Category C(S)	5378	Upload Photo
27, 28 Drummond Street				56°22′31″N 3°59′08″W	Category C(S)	5379	Upload Photo
Comrie Buildings, Drummond Street				56°22′30″N 3°59′10″W	Category C(S)	5383	Upload Photo
The Cottage And The Cake Shop, Drummond Street				56°22′30″N 3°59′11″W	Category C(S)	5384	Upload Photo
Old Parish Church Churchyard				56°22′26″N 3°59′17″W	Category B	5386	Upload Photo
Glenorchy House Dunira Street				56°22′27″N 3°59′18″W	Category C(S)	5388	Upload Photo
St Kessac's Dunira Street				56°22′27″N 3°59′18″W	Category B	5389	Upload Photo
Maurshel Dunira Street				56°22′27″N 3°59′19″W	Category C(S)	5390	Upload Photo
Dunearn Corner Of Dundas Street And Dunira Street				56°22′26″N 3°59′21″W	Category C(S)	5400	Upload Photo
Cairndhu And Carradale, Dundas Street				56°22′27″N 3°59′23″W	Category C(S)	5402	Upload Photo
Bridge Of Ross Over River Earn				56°22′29″N 3°59′49″W	Category B	5289	Upload Photo
House Of Ross				56°22′18″N 4°00′24″W	Category B	5290	Upload Photo
Mill Of Ross				56°22′19″N 4°00′37″W	Category C(S)	5291	Upload Photo
Rosewell And Hafton, Dalginross				56°22′13″N 3°59′05″W	Category C(S)	5300	Upload Photo
Ardvorlich Stables And Farm, Including Bridge To West				56°22′44″N 4°12′58″W	Category C(S)	50368	Upload Photo
St Fillans, Wellandura Including Outbuildings And Boundary Walls				56°23′38″N 4°07′17″W	Category C(S)	50391	Upload Photo
Ivy Cottage Dalginross				56°22′11″N 3°59′02″W	Category B	5307	Upload Photo
Drummonie Cottage Gowanlea Road				56°22′09″N 3°58′54″W	Category C(S)	5317	Upload Photo
Tullichettle (Former Manse Of Comrie)				56°21′37″N 3°59′20″W	Category B	5322	Upload Photo
Nos 1 And 2 Glasdale				56°22′31″N 3°59′51″W	Category C(S)	5324	Upload Photo
Malloch Buildings, Drummond Street				56°22′30″N 3°59′12″W	Category C(S)	5329	Upload Photo
Dundurn And Isdaile, Drummond Street				56°22′31″N 3°59′06″W	Category C(S)	5336	Upload Photo
St Kessog's Masonic Lodge Hall, Drummond Street				56°22′31″N 3°59′07″W	Category C(S)	5338	Upload Photo
Chiltern, Dalginross				56°22′17″N 3°59′08″W	Category C(S)	5353	Upload Photo
Kintyre, Dalginross				56°22′16″N 3°59′08″W	Category C(S)	5354	Upload Photo
The Neuk' Dalginross				56°22′16″N 3°59′08″W	Category C(S)	5355	Upload Photo
Woodview, Burrell Street				56°22′31″N 3°59′34″W	Category C(S)	5368	Upload Photo
Kilgour Cottage Burrell Street				56°22′31″N 3°59′34″W	Category C(S)	5369	Upload Photo
Morrison's Buildings, Drummond Street				56°22′32″N 3°59′07″W	Category C(S)	5377	Upload Photo
Craiglea, Drummond Street				56°22′32″N 3°59′08″W	Category C(S)	5380	Upload Photo
Dundas House With Shops Occupied By J R M Mcdougall & Son And R Kay, Corner Of Dunira Street And Dundas Street				56°22′26″N 3°59′20″W	Category C(S)	5392	Upload Photo
Schoolhouse, Dundas Street				56°22′26″N 3°59′22″W	Category B	5401	Upload Photo
Former United Free Church And Kirk Cottage Dundas Street				56°22′28″N 3°59′22″W	Category C(S)	5405	Upload Photo
Hillcote And House, Occupied By Mrs Smith, Glasdale				56°22′31″N 4°00′02″W	Category C(S)	5288	Upload Photo
The Cottage, Dundas Street				56°22′32″N 3°59′30″W	Category C(S)	76	Upload Photo
Drummond Street, Rohrbach, Stalker And Sorley's Property				56°22′28″N 3°59′14″W	Category C(S)	6205	Upload Photo
Ardvorlich House				56°22′45″N 4°13′05″W	Category B	6211	Upload Photo
Greystones And Yean House Barrack Road				56°22′14″N 3°59′02″W	Category C(S)	5314	Upload Photo
Drumearn (Including Walled Garden And Coach House And Stable Block). The Ross Comrie				56°22′24″N 4°00′03″W	Category B	5318	Upload Photo
Yen-U House Glasdale				56°22′31″N 3°59′55″W	Category C(S)	5327	Upload Photo
Ballacraine, Drummond Street				56°22′29″N 3°59′12″W	Category C(S)	5331	Upload Photo
Arden House And Shop (D Comrie & Son) Drummond Street				56°22′28″N 3°59′16″W	Category B	5333	Upload Photo
Mansefield, Manse Lane, Off Drummond Street				56°22′29″N 3°59′05″W	Category C(S)	5337	Upload Photo
16 Drummond Street				56°22′30″N 3°59′08″W	Category C(S)	5341	Upload Photo
18 Drummond Street				56°22′30″N 3°59′09″W	Category C(S)	5342	Upload Photo
7 Drummond Street				56°22′33″N 3°59′05″W	Category C(S)	5376	Upload Photo
Old Parish Church, (Now Comrie Youth Centre Flambeaux Club) Dunira St				56°22′26″N 3°59′19″W	Category A	5385	Upload another image See more images
Dunfallandy Glasdale				56°22′31″N 4°00′02″W	Category C(S)	5287	Upload Photo
Mill Of Ross Sawmill				56°22′20″N 4°00′39″W	Category C(S)	5293	Upload Photo
Dunmore Cottage				56°23′23″N 4°03′22″W	Category B	5297	Upload Photo
Ruchilbank, Dalginross				56°22′11″N 3°59′03″W	Category C(S)	5301	Upload Photo
Dalginross Bridge Over River Earn				56°22′25″N 3°59′14″W	Category C(S)	75	Upload another image See more images
St Fillans, Ard Choille Including Cottage, Boundary Walls And Gatepiers				56°23′34″N 4°07′06″W	Category C(S)	50378	Upload Photo
St Fillans, Former Railway Station With Signal Box, Waiting Room And Retaining Walls				56°23′38″N 4°06′29″W	Category B	50380	Upload another image
St Fillans, Fortrenn With Retaining Wall And Summer House				56°23′45″N 4°07′31″W	Category C(S)	50381	Upload Photo
Dunira Sawmill Including Mill Wheel, Weir, Sluice And Outbuildings				56°22′57″N 4°03′26″W	Category B	6683	Upload Photo
St Fillans, The Old Church, Former Church Of The Holy Spirit Including Steps And Boundary Wall				56°23′27″N 4°06′44″W	Category C(S)	6227	Upload Photo
Lyne Cottage, Dalginross				56°22′08″N 3°59′03″W	Category C(S)	5304	Upload Photo
Comrie House				56°22′41″N 3°59′18″W	Category C(S)	5345	Upload Photo
Comrie Post Office Buildings (Mcnaughton) Bridge Street				56°22′27″N 3°59′14″W	Category C(S)	5346	Upload Photo
Earnside (Peter W Mills) Bridge Street				56°22′26″N 3°59′14″W	Category C(S)	5347	Upload Photo
Victoria, Dalginross				56°22′21″N 3°59′12″W	Category C(S)	5350	Upload Photo
Seton Cottage, Dalginross				56°22′20″N 3°59′12″W	Category C(S)	5351	Upload Photo
Lifra, Dundas Street				56°22′31″N 3°59′29″W	Category C(S)	5360	Upload Photo
10 Dundas Street				56°22′29″N 3°59′27″W	Category C(S)	5403	Upload Photo
Mill Of Ross Miller's House				56°22′20″N 4°00′38″W	Category C(S)	5292	Upload Photo
Dalchonzie Mill Bridge Over River Earn				56°22′56″N 4°02′30″W	Category C(S)	5294	Upload Photo
Aberuchill (Original Tower House And Wing To East Only)				56°21′58″N 4°02′00″W	Category A	5296	Upload Photo
Hope Cottage (Former Stables Of The Hollies, Barrack Road)				56°22′15″N 3°58′58″W	Category C(S)	74	Upload Photo
Ardvorlich Estate, March Cottage				56°22′44″N 4°14′21″W	Category C(S)	50366	Upload Photo
Ardvorlich, Walled Garden Including Glasshouses And Sundial				56°22′46″N 4°12′50″W	Category C(S)	50369	Upload Photo
Balmenoch, Dundas Street				56°22′31″N 3°59′29″W	Category C(S)	6196	Upload Photo
Drummond Street, Rumours				56°22′28″N 3°59′13″W	Category C(S)	6203	Upload Photo
Mid Square, Dalginross				56°22′13″N 3°59′04″W	Category C(S)	5305	Upload Photo
Bracklinn, Upper Square				56°22′03″N 3°58′55″W	Category C(S)	5311	Upload Photo
Auchenross, The Ross Comrie				56°22′16″N 3°59′52″W	Category B	5319	Upload Photo
Oakbank The Ross				56°22′22″N 3°59′51″W	Category C(S)	5320	Upload Photo
Lilac Cottage Glasdale				56°22′31″N 3°59′55″W	Category C(S)	5326	Upload Photo
4 Drummond Street				56°22′32″N 3°59′05″W	Category C(S)	5334	Upload Photo
Nos 1 And 2 Bridgend Dalginross				56°22′23″N 3°59′13″W	Category C(S)	5349	Upload Photo
Benhalton, Dundas Street/Monument Road				56°22′32″N 3°59′31″W	Category C(S)	5363	Upload Photo
Glen Cottage, Monument Road				56°22′32″N 3°59′34″W	Category C(S)	5366	Upload Photo
Atholl Bank, Burrell Street				56°22′30″N 3°59′34″W	Category C(S)	5372	Upload Photo
Gould Cottage, Drummond Street				56°22′31″N 3°59′10″W	Category C(S)	5382	Upload Photo
Knocknairn Drummond Street				56°22′27″N 3°59′20″W	Category C(S)	5391	Upload Photo
Royal Hotel Melville Square. Including Former Stabling				56°22′28″N 3°59′17″W	Category B	5394	Upload Photo
Glenearn, Dundas Street				56°22′29″N 3°59′25″W	Category B	5407	Upload Photo
Craigard, Dundas Street				56°22′30″N 3°59′26″W	Category C(S)	5408	Upload Photo
Morven, Dundas Street				56°22′30″N 3°59′27″W	Category C(S)	5409	Upload Photo
Dalchonzie House				56°22′41″N 4°02′14″W	Category B	5295	Upload Photo
St Leonards, Dalginross				56°22′11″N 3°59′03″W	Category C(S)	5302	Upload Photo
St Fillans, Bridge Over The River Earn				56°23′30″N 4°06′13″W	Category B	59	Upload Photo
Drummond Estate, Glen Artney Church (Church Of Scotland)				56°19′10″N 4°05′02″W	Category C(S)	48624	Upload Photo
St Fillans, Allt An Fhionn, Former Railway Viaduct				56°23′53″N 4°08′15″W	Category B	50375	Upload Photo
St Fillans, Dundurn Parish Church (Church Of Scotland)				56°23′30″N 4°07′01″W	Category C(S)	50379	Upload Photo
Drummond Street, Foster's Property				56°22′27″N 3°59′15″W	Category C(S)	6707	Upload Photo
Drummond Street, Richard's Property				56°22′29″N 3°59′12″W	Category C(S)	6201	Upload Photo
Drummond Street, Benview And Shop (Boyd)				56°22′28″N 3°59′14″W	Category C(S)	6206	Upload Photo
Drummond Street And Bridge Street, Royal Bank Of Scotland				56°22′27″N 3°59′15″W	Category C(S)	6208	Upload Photo
Invergeldie Bridge Over Invergeldie Burn				56°25′17″N 4°02′29″W	Category B	6215	Upload Photo
Aberuchil Castle Burial Ground, Strageath's Graves				56°22′09″N 4°02′13″W	Category C(S)	6217	Upload Photo
Victoria Cottage, Glasdale				56°22′31″N 3°59′54″W	Category C(S)	5325	Upload Photo
12 Drummond Street				56°22′31″N 3°59′07″W	Category C(S)	5339	Upload Photo
Millside, Nurse's Lane				56°22′36″N 3°59′08″W	Category B	5344	Upload Photo
Craigbeg, Dalginross				56°22′20″N 3°59′11″W	Category C(S)	5352	Upload Photo
Wellpark, Dalginross				56°22′15″N 3°59′08″W	Category C(S)	5356	Upload Photo
Benyhone Cottage, 21 Dundas Street				56°22′31″N 3°59′28″W	Category B	5358	Upload Photo
Thornlea, Burrell Street				56°22′31″N 3°59′33″W	Category C(S)	5371	Upload Photo
Property Occupied By Mckeith, Drummond Street				56°22′31″N 3°59′09″W	Category C(S)	5381	Upload Photo
Comrie Bookshop Melville Lane				56°22′29″N 3°59′17″W	Category C(S)	5397	Upload Photo
Comrie Primary School				56°22′32″N 3°59′23″W	Category B	5399	Upload Photo
Station Road, St Serf's Episcopal Church Including Gates				56°22′35″N 3°58′59″W	Category C(S)	48625	Upload Photo
Balimeanach Farm				56°22′46″N 4°12′18″W	Category C(S)	50370	Upload Photo
Drummond Street, Lesley Macdougal's Property				56°22′28″N 3°59′12″W	Category C(S)	6202	Upload Photo
Drummond Street, Commercial Lane, Former Secession Church				56°22′27″N 3°59′13″W	Category C(S)	6204	Upload Photo
Drummond Street, F Hamilton's Property				56°22′28″N 3°59′14″W	Category C(S)	6207	Upload Photo
Ardvorlich House, North Gate				56°22′46″N 4°13′16″W	Category C(S)	6213	Upload Photo
Heath Cottages Dalginross				56°22′09″N 3°59′01″W	Category C(S)	5309	Upload Photo
Comrie Cottage Upper Square Dalginross				56°22′01″N 3°58′54″W	Category C(S)	5312	Upload Photo
Ruchill House Barrack Road				56°22′17″N 3°58′49″W	Category C(S)	5316	Upload Photo
Earthquake House The Ross, Comrie				56°22′19″N 4°00′03″W	Category C(S)	5323	Upload another image See more images
Earn Cottage Glasdale				56°22′30″N 3°59′57″W	Category C(S)	5328	Upload Photo
6 Drummond Street				56°22′31″N 3°59′05″W	Category C(S)	5335	Upload Photo
14 Drummond Street				56°22′31″N 3°59′08″W	Category C(S)	5340	Upload Photo
20 Drummond Street				56°22′30″N 3°59′09″W	Category C(S)	5343	Upload Photo
Earnhope Dalginross				56°22′16″N 3°59′05″W	Category C(S)	5357	Upload Photo
Aberuchill View Dundas Street				56°22′31″N 3°59′28″W	Category C(S)	5359	Upload Photo
Lednock Cottage, Drummond Street				56°22′34″N 3°59′03″W	Category C(S)	5374	Upload Photo
Lednock Bank, Drummond Street				56°22′34″N 3°59′03″W	Category C(S)	5375	Upload Photo
Sheds, East Side Of Melville Lane, Off Drummond Street (Hotel And Comrie Bookshop Property)				56°22′29″N 3°59′16″W	Category C(S)	5396	Upload Photo
Blinkbonny, Melville Lane				56°22′30″N 3°59′17″W	Category C(S)	5398	Upload Photo
Lynton, Dundas Street				56°22′29″N 3°59′25″W	Category B	5406	Upload Photo
St Fillan's Chapel And Burial Ground				56°23′12″N 4°06′04″W	Category B	5298	Upload Photo
St Fillans, Rose Cottage Including Boundary Walls And Gatepiers				56°23′36″N 4°07′13″W	Category C(S)	48094	Upload Photo
Loch Earn, Memorial Stone To Major James Stewart				56°22′53″N 4°12′56″W	Category C(S)	50373	Upload Photo

== Key ==
The scheme for classifying buildings in Scotland is:

- Category A: "buildings of national or international importance, either architectural or historic; or fine, little-altered examples of some particular period, style or building type."
- Category B: "buildings of regional or more than local importance; or major examples of some particular period, style or building type, which may have been altered."
- Category C: "buildings of local importance; lesser examples of any period, style, or building type, as originally constructed or moderately altered; and simple traditional buildings which group well with other listed buildings."

In March 2016 there were 47,288 listed buildings in Scotland. Of these, 8% were Category A, and 50% were Category B, with the remaining 42% being Category C.
