= Scouthal Burn =

River in Highland, Scotland

Coordinates: 58°27′32″N 3°18′18″W

Scouthal Burn, a continuation of Burn of Acharole has its source in the Flow Country of Caithness, in the Highland area of Scotland, at a height of around 50 metres, at the confluence of the Burn of Achorole and Alt Feithe Buidhe and about three kilometres south/southwest of the village of Watten.

Scouthal Burn meanders generally north/north-westward, across a distance of about two kilometres, with the Moss of Badarclay to its east, to join Strath Burn and so form the source of the Wick River, at around 25 metres and about one kilometre south of Watten.
