= Wester Pipe Railway =

Narrow gauge railway in Caithness, Scotland

Coordinates: 58.508°N 3.135°W

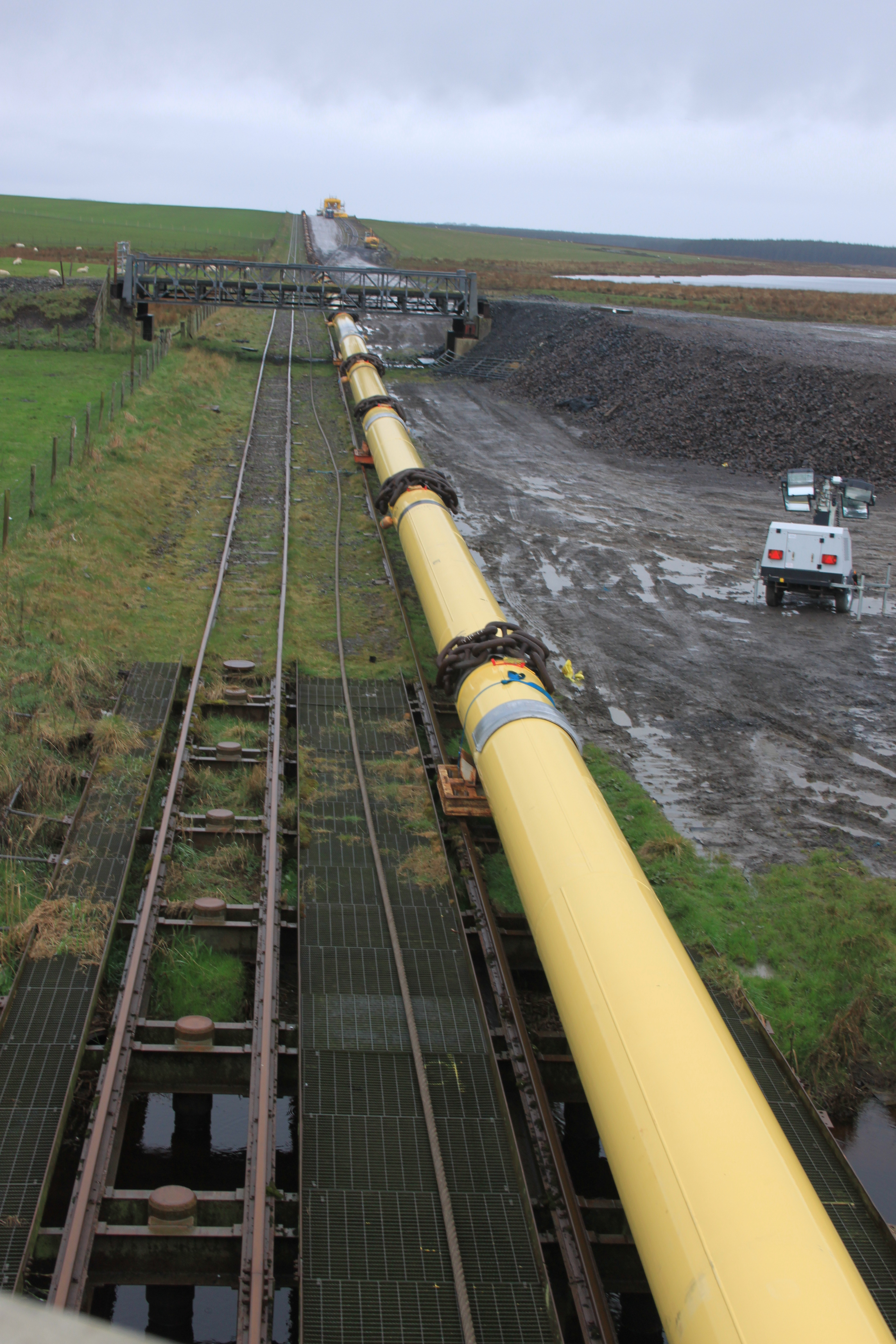
Oil pipeline being carried at the end of the line near Bridge of Wester

The Wester Pipe Railway is a narrow gauge railway that runs from Hastigrow on the B876 road to Westerloch on the A99, all within Caithness. The line is double track for most of the route and uses Metre gauge. It is used to transport pipeline segments to the sea. It is the second northernmost railway in the United Kingdom with the first being the spur to Thurso on the Far North Line.

== Route ==
The line starts in Hastigrow and runs 7.8 kilometres (4.8 mi) east south east towards the coast where the depot of Subsea 7 is located.

== Operations ==
The railway is owned and operated by Subsea 7, who operate the railway and the pipelines around it to their port in Westerloch near Wick. The railway uses ocean-going tugs to operate it. Pipeline segments are combined at a site on the inland end of the railway and then towed to the sea, using the vessels. The individual pipes are often brought to Scotland by train as well. They are transported onto the railway by being taken to Georgemas Junction and then finish their journey to the Subsea 7 site by road. Entire pipelines are transported along the rail, giving it the record for the longest thing ever to be transported by rail: a 7.7-kilometre (4.8 mi) long pipe, only 100 metres (330 ft) shorter than the main section of railway itself. Many of the tracks were re-laid in 2014.

Four lines exist West of the bridge under the A99 road, however the main stem of the railway is just two tracks. This allows the sections to be completed concurrently, then joined together just before the road bridge.
