= Haster =

Coordinates: 58.444099°N 3.156581°W

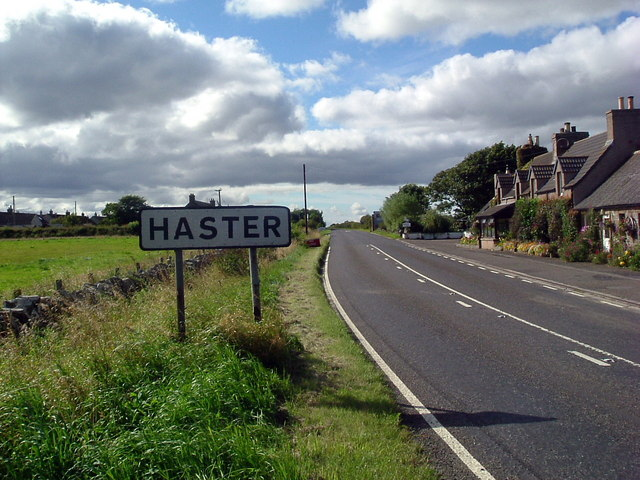
- Sign on the A882

- Location within the Caithness area
- OS grid reference: ND313390
- Council area: Highland
- Country: Scotland
- Sovereign state: United Kingdom
- Postcode district: KW1 5
- Police: Scotland
- Fire: Scottish
- Ambulance: Scottish

Haster is a small remote rural hamlet and district in Wick, in the Highland area of Scotland. It is located just west of the Bridge of Haster, which carries the A882 road linking the burghs of Wick and Thurso over the Achairn Burn to the main A9 road. It is about 2 1/2 miles (4 km) west of Wick and about 5 1/2 miles (9 km) east of Watten. An older village centre is about half a mile to the south.

Haster has two play parks and a football pitch, and there is a memorial fountain dedicated to General Lord Horne in the hamlet.

The ruins of St Cuthbert's Church is close to the hamlet. Thought to have measured 40 by 14 feet (12 by 4 m), in 1726 it was described as the "Chapell of Haulster - the common people bury their dead about it".
