= A882 road =

Road in Scotland

A882

Major junctions
- North West end: Clayock
- A9; A99
- South East end: Wick

Location
- Country: United Kingdom
- Constituent country: Scotland
- Primary destinations: Wick

Road network
- Roads in the United Kingdom; Motorways; A and B road zones

The A882 road is entirely within Caithness in the Highland area of Scotland. It has a length of about 23 kilometres (14 mi) and runs generally west/northwest from the A99 in the county town of Wick to the A9 in the Georgemas area.

About 12 kilometres (7.5 mi) from Wick the road passes through the village of Watten, where it is crossed by the B870.

The A882 is part of the most direct route between Wick and the burgh of Thurso: 8 kilometres (5.0 mi) of the A9 complete the route.

Between Wick and Watten the traveller has Wick River to the right. The road crosses the river at Watten. Between Watten and Georgemas Loch Watten and Loch Scarmclate are to the right. The traveller who continues to Thurso on the A9 will have the River Thurso to the left.

== Towns, villages and junctions ==
The A882 runs through or near towns and villages listed below. Junctions listed are with other classified roads.

Places and junctions	Ordnance Survey Grid references and other notes
Wick, A99	ND362506. From Wick the A99 runs (1) generally north the John o' Groats and (2) generally south/southwest to the A9 at Latheron.
Bridge of Haster	ND327512
Watten, B870	ND242544. From Watten the B870 runs (1) generally north/northeast to the B876 near Kirk and (2) generally west to a crossroads with the A9 at Mybster, then to Westerdale, and then generally north to Glengolly.
Georgemas, A9	ND156601. From Georgemas the A9 runs (1) generally north to Thurso and (2) generally south to Latheron, Inverness, Perth and Falkirk.
