= Georgemas (disambiguation) =

Georgemas is an area in the county of Caithness, in the Highland area of Scotland.

Georgemas may also refer to:

- St. George's Day, also known as Georgemas
- International Book Day, also known as Georgemas
- Georgemas Junction railway station serving the village of Halkirk, Scotland
- Georgemas, a now-historic St. George's Day agricultural fair on Sordale Hill in the county of Caithness, in the Highland area of Scotland
