= Devizes Plot =

1944 planned escape of German prisoners of war

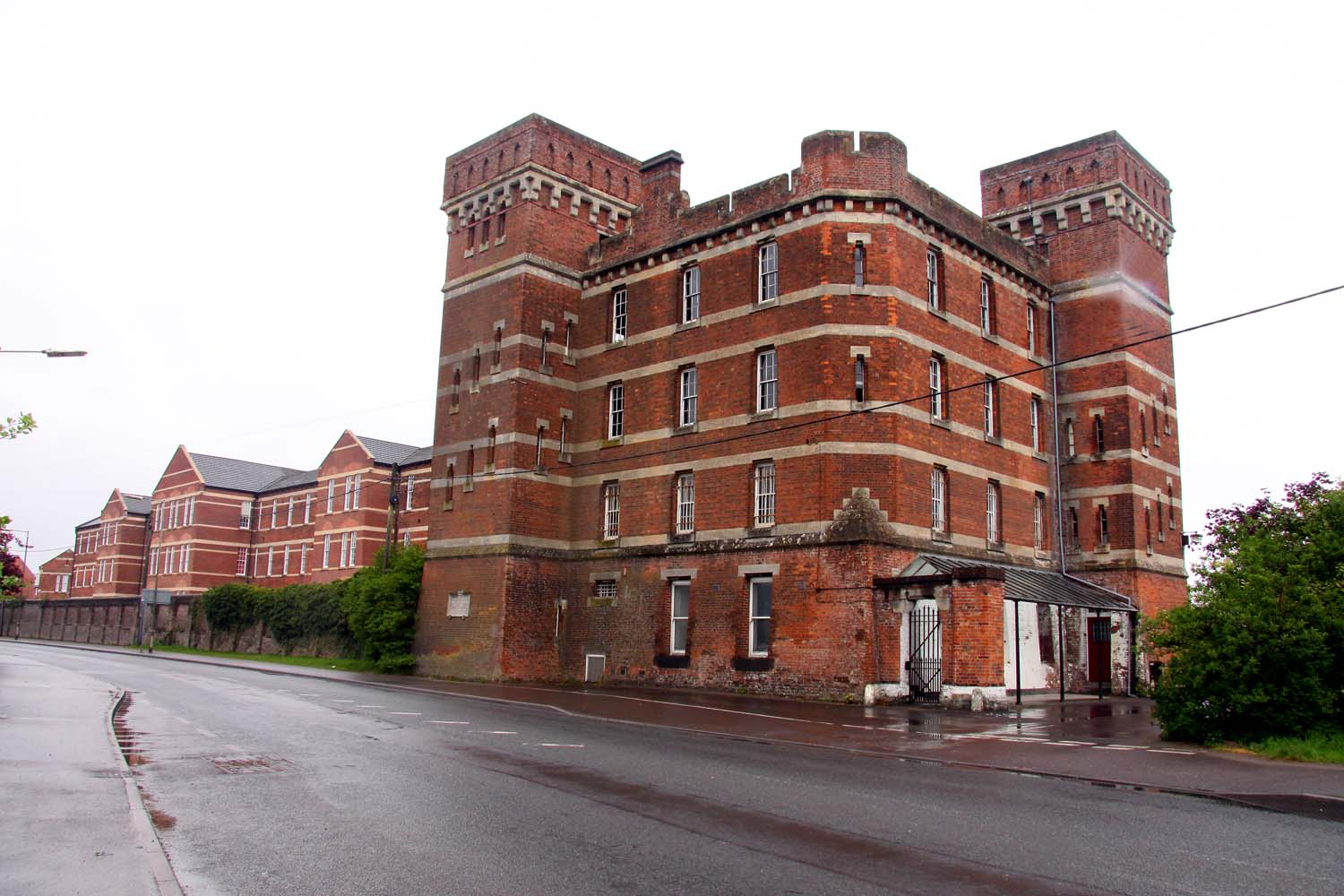
- Le Marchant Barracks, where the prisoners were held
- Date: 1944
- Location: Le Marchant Barracks, Devizes
- Outcome: Failure, lynching of Wolfgang Rosterg

The Devizes plot was a failed escape plan for 7,000 German prisoners of war held at Le Marchant Barracks in Devizes. It was scheduled to take place at Christmas 1944, in the belief that there would be fewer guards at the camp and the remainder would be distracted due to festivities. American interrogators attached to XVIII Airborne Corps discovered the plot and reported it to British authorities, with two members subsequently awarded the bronze star medal for their roles in the investigation. Prisoners suspected of involvement were sent to the London Cage for further interrogation by Colonel Alexander Scotland and afterwards to the maximum-security Cultybraggan Camp in Comrie. Feldwebel Wolfgang Rosterg, a deserter known to hold anti-Nazi views, was wrongfully accused of having been an informant of the plans and lynched by prisoners in Cultybraggan. Six men were convicted of his murder, of whom five were hanged at Pentonville Prison in the last mass execution in Britain.

== Plot ==
The Devizes plot was an escape attempt planned by prisoners held at Le Marchant Barracks. The leadership behind the plot is disputed among sources. Many attribute leadership to Warrant Officer Erich Pallme-Koenig, including The Guardian and the Gazette and Herald in their descriptions of the plot. However a 1996 account by military historian Roderick De Normann names the prisoners Obergefreiter Wunderlich and Korporal Hermann Storch as the main conspirators. Normann was only able to find official documents referencing Koenig upon his involvement in the lynching of Feldwebel Wolfgang Rosterg at Cultybraggan camp.

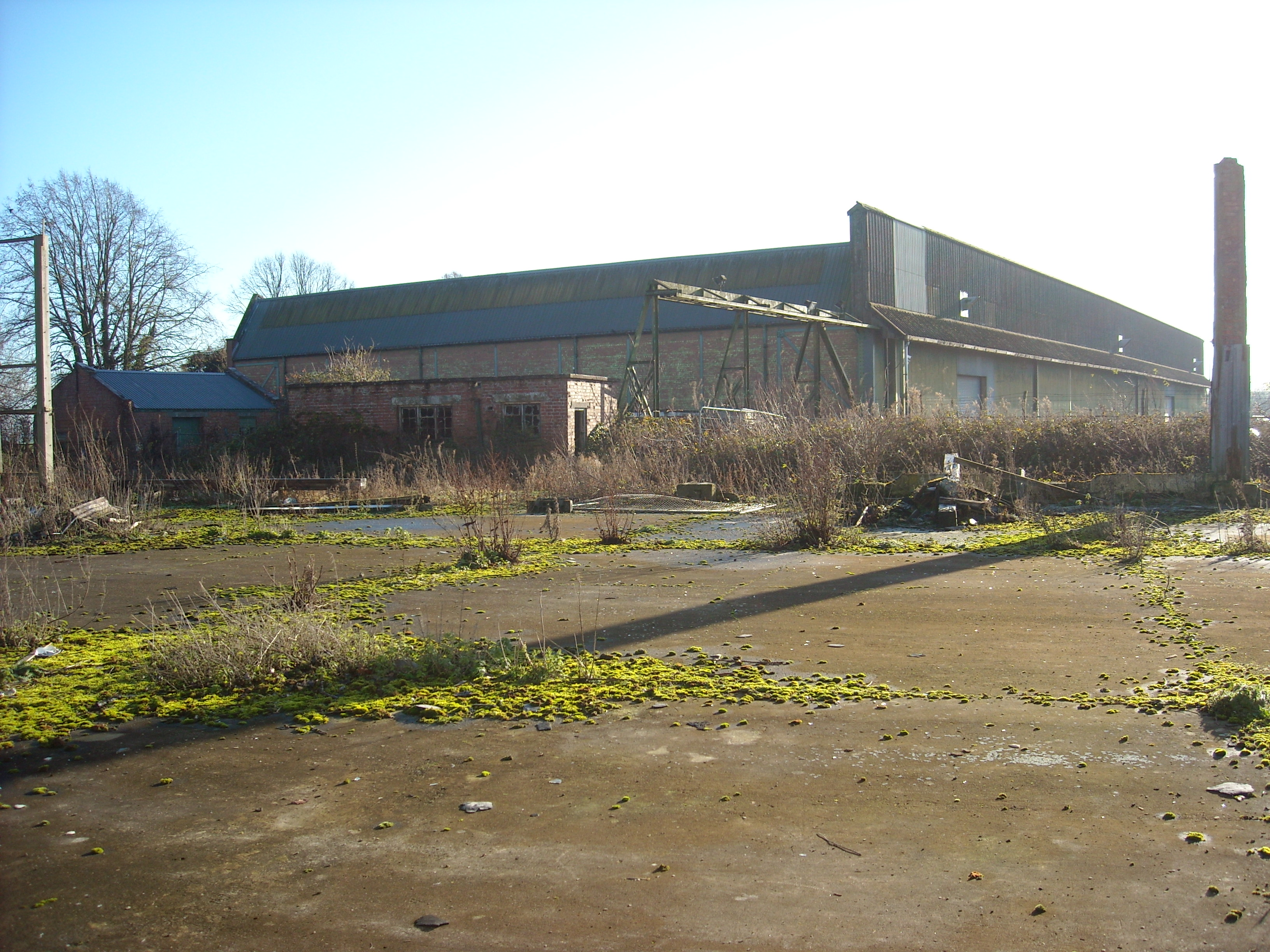
The remains of RAF Yatesbury

A prisoner scout group breached the perimeter fence of the camp in search of usable airfields which could be seized after the escape. Upon their return to Devizes two days later, they claimed to have been lost due to the removal of roadsigns in the local countryside.

The escape was planned for a date close to Christmas 1944. The conspirators believed that there would be fewer guards in the camp, and that those remaining would be distracted due to the festivities. It was estimated that 7,000 PoWs could escape from Le Marchant, who would proceed to seize RAF Yatesbury and gain access to equipment including aircraft and armoured vehicles. The prisoners would proceed to liberate more PoWs held at Lodge Moor (PoW camp 17) in Sheffield.

The ultimate goal of the plot was to reach the eastern coast of Britain, around East Anglia, attacking military installations including a tank depot in the process. The prisoners would then make contact with German forces for rescue. Some sources list an attack on London as another objective.

== Discovery and British response ==
The British first became aware of the plot through an American attachment to Le Marchant, part of XVIII Airborne Corps.

Details of how the Devizes plot was first discovered are also disputed. One account states the Americans Frank Brandstetter and Joseph Hoelz overheard a prisoner say that "the arms store was the key." They reported this to the chief interpreter of the camp, who ordered a re-interrogation of the prisoners in the scouting group. Covert listening devices placed around the camp were re-activated, which gave away details of the plot to the camp's commanders. Another account detailed by De Normann claims that Korporal Storch revealed the plot upon interrogation by another American officer, Lieutenant Vogeli, after being accused of instigating a separate escape attempt on 19 November. Brandstetter and Hoelz were subsequently involved in further investigations. The bronze star medal was awarded to Brandstetter and Hoelz for their work in uncovering the plot.

British authorities responded by increasing troop presence around Le Marchant. B Company of the Eighth Paratrooper Battalion were briefed on known details of the plot and stationed at the camp. Colonel Alexander Scotland of MI19 sent two interrogators to Devizes to assist in further inquiries.

== Aftermath ==
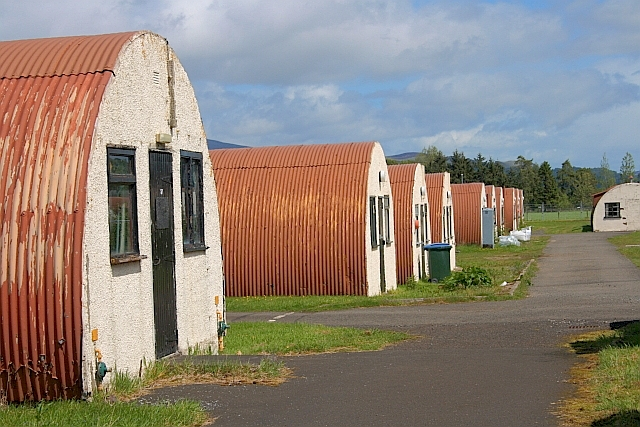
Nissen huts at Cultybraggan Camp

Suspected ringleaders of the Devizes plot were arrested on 14 December 1944. Thirty-two prisoners were sent to the London Cage on coaches for interrogation, escorted by members of six platoon from the Eighth Paratrooper Battalion. The interrogations took place from 16 to 20 December, with Scotland identifying seven as ringleaders of the plot and the other twenty-five as having little or no knowledge.

Twenty-seven of the interrogated prisoners were subsequently transferred to Cultybraggan Camp, one of two maximum-security PoW camps in Britain at the time. Among the people sent to Cultybraggan was Feldwebel Wolfgang Rosterg, who worked as an interpreter at Le Marchant. Rosterg was a prisoner with known anti-Nazi views who had deserted in France and openly spoke out against the Nazi Party. Rosterg was found to have no knowledge of the plot upon interrogation and it is likely that he was moved to Cultybraggan in error.

=== Lynching of Wolfgang Rosterg ===
Prisoners involved in the Devizes plot incorrectly believed Rosterg had informed the British of their plans and that he had been sent to Cultybraggan to continue spying on them. Their suspicions were further raised after he asked for a copy of "die Wochenpost", a PoW newspaper produced by the foreign office which was widely regarded by other prisoners as British propaganda. Rosterg was made to face a kangaroo court in Hut 4 of Compound B. His documents were seized and distributed amongst bystanders as evidence of treason. He was beaten by prisoners after failing to respond to questioning, some of whom were armed with iron bars, and his body was hung in a toilet block.

=== Conviction of murderers ===
Rosterg's body was discovered by authorities at the camp's 8:30 am roll call. Medical staff at the camp believed they saw vital signs and attempted resuscitation, but were ultimately unsuccessful. An autopsy of Rosterg's body determined that he had died of strangulation. Medical witnesses later testified that Rosterg's wounds from his beating were insufficient to cause death, and he had likely died to strangulation prior to being hanged in the toilets.

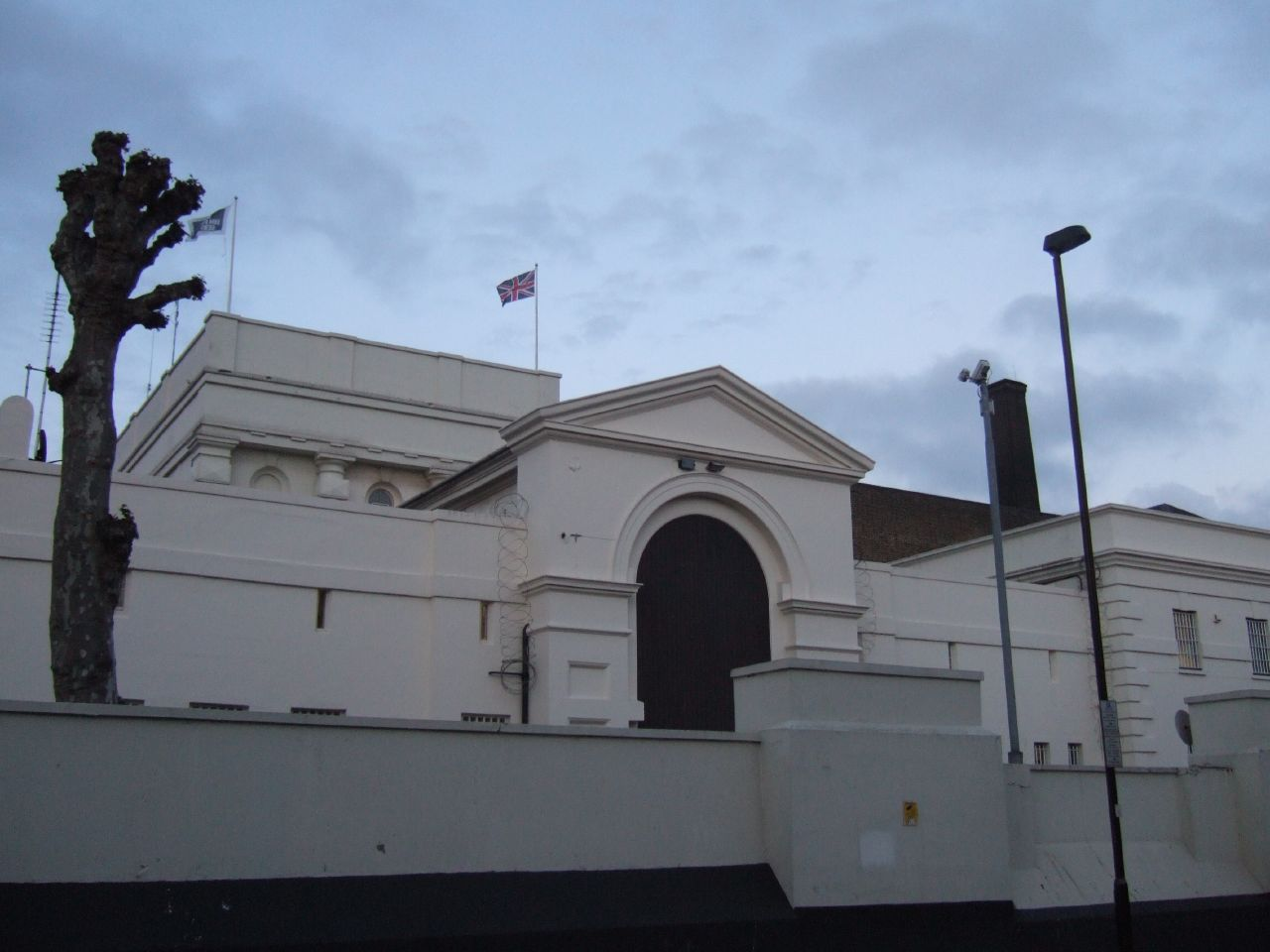
Pentonville Prison

Twelve prisoners were initially indicted over the murder of Rosterg, but charges were dropped against four because of insufficient evidence. On 2 July 1945, the remaining eight were tried in a military court at the London Cage. All defendants pled not guilty. The prisoners argued that Rosterg deserved to be killed for being a traitor to Germany, claiming that British PoWs held at Breslau had killed an officer they believed had betrayed escape plans to the German authorities. No action had been taken against the British PoWs involved in the Breslau lynching. However, the defending officer was unaware of the case and the Air Ministry was unable to verify it; ultimately it was considered to be irrelevant to the trial.

The judge presiding over the case accepted that Rosterg would have been seen as deserving of contempt from the Germans' point of view. Prosecutors argued that this did not give them the right to murder Rosterg, additionally it was observed that the defendants appeared to be bored or otherwise disinterested at points in the trial. Two prisoners, Luftwaffe Soldat Herbert Wunderlich and army Gefreiter Hans Klein were acquitted, one, Luftwaffe Unteroffizier Rolf Herzig was sentenced to life imprisonment and the remaining five were sentenced to death. The executions of prisoners army Oberfähnrich Erich Pallme-Koenig, Waffen-SS Sturmmann Karl Zühlsdorff, Waffen-SS Unterscharführer Joachim Goltz, Kriegsmarine Matrosengefreiter Josef Mertens and Waffen-SS Rottenführer Heinrich-Wernhard Brüning were carried out at 9 am, 6 October 1945, by Albert Pierrepoint in Pentonville prison. This was the largest mass execution in the United Kingdom since 1883, when the perpetrators of the Phoenix Park murders were hanged, and the last mass execution in Britain.

== In literature ==
An American forces' newspaper reported on the awarding of the Bronze Star to Brandstetter and Hoelz. The Devizes plot was first publicly described in The London Cage by Colonel Scotland. Rosterg's death formed a main part of the storyline of Black Camp 21, a 2018 novel by Bill Jones. Jones was inspired to write the book because he had slept in a Nissen hut at Cultybraggan as a child.
