= Loch of Winless =

Lake in Caithness, in Scotland

- Loch of Winless
- Interactive map of Loch of Winless
- Coordinates: 58.47457°N 3.21458°W
- Type: Lochan
- Primary inflows: Burn of Winless
- Primary outflows: Wick River
- Ocean/sea sources: North Sea
- Catchment area: 2,128 hectares (5,260 acres)
- Basin countries: Scotland
- Surface area: 6 hectares (15 acres)
- Average depth: 8 metres (26 ft)

Loch of Winless is a small, narrow and shallow loch (lochan) which drains into the Wick River in Caithness, north-east Scotland. It lies some 7 kilometres (4.3 mi) north-west of Wick.

== Description ==
The loch covers an area of 6 hectares (15 acres), a catchment area of 2,128 hectares (5,260 acres) and an elevation of 8 metres (26 ft) above sea level, with an average depth of 38 metres (125 ft). The outflow from the loch drains into the Wick River. The hamlet of Winless lies to the south-east of the loch.

The loch, which is an SSSI, is noted for its bottle sedge and marsh marigold, and lies some 7 kilometres (4.3 mi) north-west of Wick. The loch is mostly filled in with encroaching peat, something that the surrounding Flow Country is known for.
