= John Manson Craig =

Recipient of the Victoria Cross

- Born: 5 March 1896; Comrie, Perthshire
- Died: 19 February 1970 (aged 73); Crieff, Perthshire
- Military career
- Allegiance: United Kingdom
- Branch: British Army; Royal Air Force
- Service years: 1915–1919; 1940–1945
- Rank: Wing commander
- Units: The Royal Scots Fusiliers
- Conflicts: World War I World War II
- Awards: Victoria Cross

John Manson Craig, VC (5 March 1896 – 19 February 1970) was a British Army officer and Scottish recipient of the Victoria Cross, the highest award for gallantry in the face of the enemy that can be awarded to British and Commonwealth forces.

Craig was 21 years old, and a second lieutenant in the 1/4th Battalion, The Royal Scots Fusiliers, British Army, attached to 1/5th Battalion during the First World War when the following deed took place for which he was awarded the VC.

On 5 June 1917, an advanced post at Umbella Hills (southwest of Gaza) having been rushed by the enemy, Second Lieutenant Craig immediately organised a rescue party and after tracking the enemy back to his trenches, set his party to work removing the dead and wounded under heavy rifle and machine-gun fire. An NCO was wounded and a medical officer who went to his aid was also wounded. Second Lieutenant Craig went out at once and got the NCO under cover, but while taking the medical officer to shelter was himself wounded. Nevertheless, the rescue was effected, and he then scooped cover for the wounded, thus saving their lives.

Craig served in the Royal Air Force during the Second World War.
