= Ben Chonzie =

Scottish mountain

Ben Chonzie (Ben-y-Hone)
- Beinn a' Chomhainn
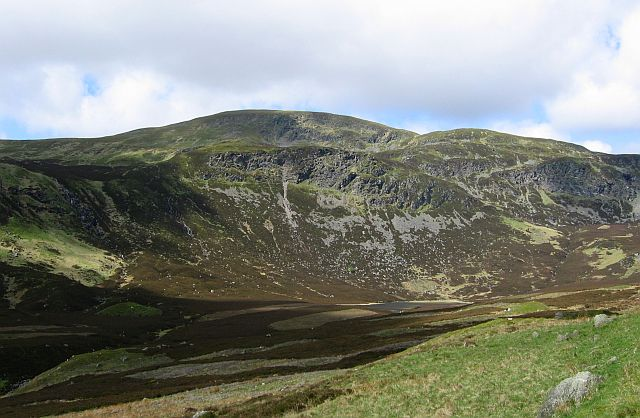
- Ben Chonzie from the Glen Turret side

Highest point
- Elevation: 931 m (3,054 ft)
- Prominence: 645 m (2,116 ft)
- Parent peak: Ben More
- Listing: Munro, Marilyn
- Coordinates: 56°27′14″N 3°59′31″W

Naming
- Language of name: Gaelic
- Pronunciation: Gaelic [ˈpeiɲ ə ˈxɔːɲɪç]

Geography
- Location: Perth and Kinross, Scotland
- Parent range: Grampian Mountains
- OS grid: NN773308
- Topo map(s): OS Landranger 51 and 52; OS Explorer 379

Ben Chonzie or Ben-y-Hone (Scottish Gaelic: Beinn a' Chomhainn, 'mountain of the narrowness', or possibly from Beinn Chòinnich, 'mossy mountain') is a mountain in the Breadalbane region of the Scottish Highlands. It is eleven kilometres northwest of Crieff. It stands at 931 metres (3,054 ft) and is therefore listed as a Munro. It is the highest point of a large area of moorland and rounded hills between Loch Earn and Loch Tay, and with a broad, flat summit and relatively few distinguishing features, it is often regarded as one of Scotland's least interesting Munros.

It is most often climbed from Invergeldie (Comrie) to the southwest; however it can also be climbed from the southeast by way of Glen Turret. The latter is longer but presents walkers with a more interesting and scenic climb, having an array of buttresses and cliffs which can be tackled by those who feel brave, or passed by on either side. Mountain hares (Lepus timidus, subspecies Lepus timidus scoticus) can be seen around the plateau area if walkers are quiet and observant. There are also many other animals on the approaches to the Ben, including buzzards, other birds of prey, and frogs and newts in the pools alongside the vehicular track that runs up the eastern aspect of the loch. Deer may be seen on the slopes to the north of the Ben.
