= Cultybraggan Camp =

Scottish former military facility, now a community property asset

- Comrie
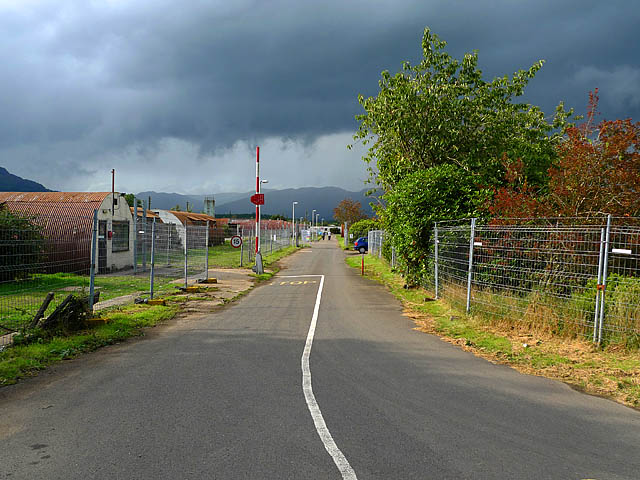
- Entrance to Cultybraggan Camp

Site information
- Type: Prisoner of War Camp
- Owner: Comrie Development Trust
- Operator: Comrie Development Trust

Location
- Location within Perth and Kinross
- Coordinates: 56°21′20″N 03°59′39″W

Site history
- Built: 1941
- Built for: War Office
- Built by: 249 Company Pioneer Corps
- In use: 1941–2004

Cultybraggan Camp, also known as the Black Camp of the North, is a former prisoner of war (PoW) camp located close to the village of Comrie, in west Perthshire, Scotland. Built in 1941, it was one of two high-security PoW camps in Britain during World War II and held many prisoners classified by British authorities as the most committed Nazis. The camp became notorious following the murder of Feldwebel Wolfgang Rosterg at the hands of other prisoners, with five later executed at Pentonville prison for their role in his death.

During the Cold War, Cultybraggan housed a Royal Observer Corps monitoring post and an underground Regional Government Headquarters bunker. The site has since been sold under a community right-to-buy scheme to the Comrie Development Trust, who have overseen the conversion of some of the camp's Nissen huts into accommodation and locations for business ventures. Historic Scotland considers Cultybraggan to be "one of the three best preserved purpose-built WWII prisoner of war camps in Britain", with many of the camp's huts having category A or B listings.

== History ==
James V of Scotland came to Cultybraggan in September 1532 to hunt deer. Records survive of the food he consumed including bread, ale, and fish sent from Stirling. The land for Cultybraggan Camp was owned by Cultybraggan Farm prior to its acquisition by the British Army in 1941.

=== Second World War ===
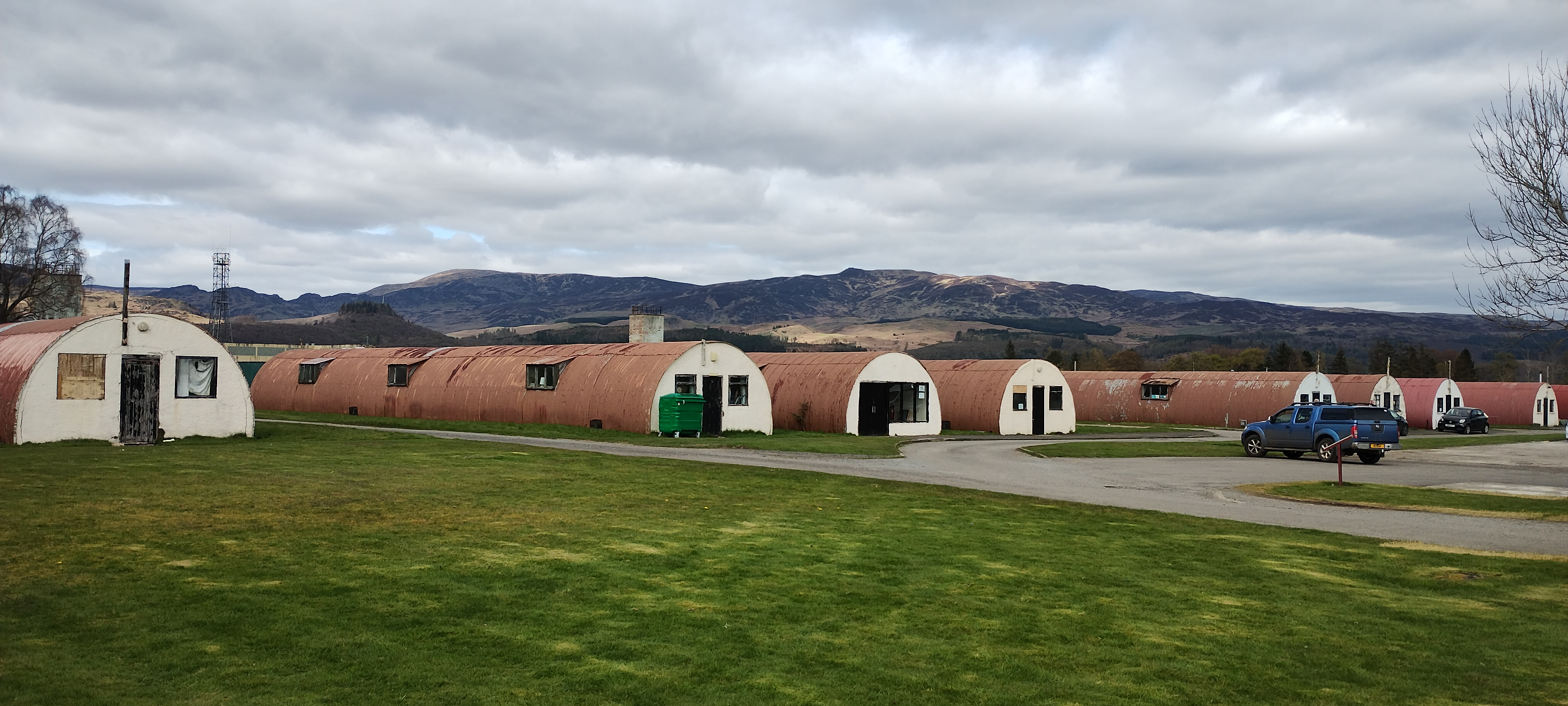
Nissen huts at Cultybraggan

The camp was built in May–October 1941 by members of 249 Company Pioneer Corps, which was composed primarily of Jewish refugees from Germany and Austria. Cultybraggan was designated as prisoner of war camp 21. Initially, Cultybraggan was used as a labour camp for Italian prisoners of war, before later being assigned as a transit and then base camp for German PoWs. The camp had a maximum capacity of 4,500 prisoners. A nearby camp designated 21A was located in Cowden, Comrie, which could hold up to 500 overflow prisoners from Cultybraggan.

Cultybraggan was one of two maximum-security PoW camps in Britain, having a large quantity of "black" or "category C" prisoners - those who were considered to be the most committed Nazis and likely to cause trouble. Prisoners were brought to Comrie on special railway trains, and were subsequently marched through the village towards Cultybraggan. The camp was divided into four sections of approximately 100 Nissen huts each, designated with the letters A to D. While prisoners were accommodated initially with disregard to categorization, this was changed after a murder on site. Compounds A and B subsequently housed "black" category prisoners, whereas compounds C and D housed "grey" and "white" category prisoners, who were considered less ardent Nazis and allowed to leave the camp to undertake work in the local community. Compounds had access to facilities including shower blocks, classrooms, a library and a place of worship. Inmates at the camp organised a choir and orchestra. A re-education program taught various classes, with the most popular being English. Some prisoners were allowed to work outside of the camp in sectors including construction and forestry.

British guards were originally responsible for the security of the camp, but had been replaced with Polish guards of the Free Polish Forces by 1944. It was believed that the Polish would be less lenient towards the German prisoners as a result of the German occupation of Poland, and thus would be an effective deterrent to misbehaviour. In one incident, a guard shot a prisoner in the head for allegedly getting too close to the camp's perimeter fence. There are various accounts of attempted escapes from Cultybraggan through tunnelling, including one tunnel originating from compound A that went past the camp's perimeter and another originating from the shower block of compound B. A 2017 excavation by the University of Glasgow was unable to find evidence of tunnels, partially due to the post-WWII demolition of compound B with bulldozers which would have destroyed any tunnel remains. It also found that the soil composition around Cultybraggan would have significantly hindered any attempts at tunnelling.

Cultybraggan gained notoriety after the death of Feldwebel Wolfgang Rosterg on its premises. Rosterg was a prisoner of war with known anti-Nazi views who openly spoke against Hitler and Nazism. He was sent to Cultybraggan by accident along with conspirators of the failed Devizes plot, an attempt at staging the mass escape of PoWs from Le Marchant Camp to attack London, stalling the Allied invasion of Germany and turning the tide of the war. The conspirators incorrectly believed that Rosterg had been an informant of their plot to the British and had been taken to Cultybraggan to spy on them. Rosterg was accused by a group of PoWs of treason and tried in a kangaroo court. He was subsequently beaten and lynched in Hut 4 of Compound B. Six PoWs were convicted in a military court for his murder, one of which was sentenced to life imprisonment and the other five hanged at Pentonville Prison. This was the largest mass execution in the United Kingdom since the perpetrators of the Phoenix Park murders were hanged, and the last mass-execution in Britain.

Due to the large amount of "black" prisoners housed in Cultybraggan, some areas of the camp contained groups of hardline Nazis who were openly hostile towards guards and "white" category prisoners. These groups continually monitored others for disloyalty to the Nazi regime - in one instance announcing that those who volunteered to go to a new camp of anti-Nazi prisoners (camp 13 in Shap, Penrith) would be considered traitors and punished as such. Compound B was identified as especially problematic. Cultybraggan correspondingly earned the nicknames "Nazi 2" and the "Black Camp of the North". Following the murder of Rosterg, many "black" prisoners were transferred to other camps such as Watten in Caithness. This initiative successfully reduced tension within the camp.

The arrival of the charismatic Captain Herbert Sulzbach, who had been a decorated soldier in the German Army in the first world war, represented a change for the better. Sultzbach was Jewish and anti-Nazi, and he and his wife Beate had to flee Nazi Germany in 1938. He subsequently joined the British Army, and did extraordinary work helping to denazify prisoners of war at Cultybraggan. He was eventually awarded an OBE.

=== Post–Second World War ===
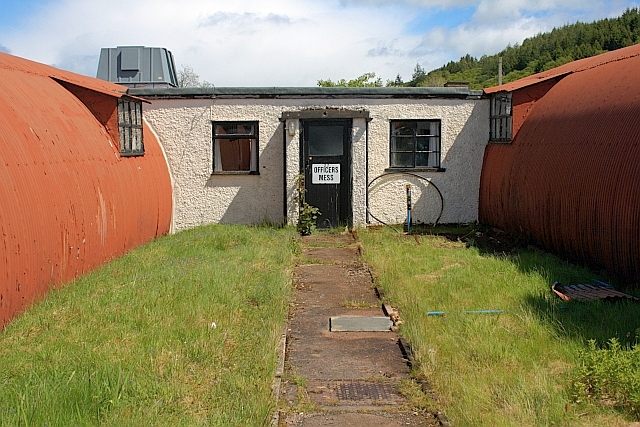
Hut 65, which was converted to a mess hall

Cultybraggan ceased operations as a PoW camp by May 1947 following the departure of its last prisoners to be repatriated. Some prisoners opted to stay in Comrie as a result of relationships with local women developed during the war. By 1948, Cultybraggan was being used as a training camp by the Territorial Army, with a capacity of 650-700 people.

The camp hosted numerous units from across Britain including the 4th Royal Norfolk Regiment (for training in "Winter warfare"), Army Cadets. and Air Training Corps cadets. Troops and cadets would utilise the shooting range, extensive assault course and military exercises on hills to the south of the camp.

The Ministry of Defence took ownership of Cultybraggan in 1950, under its leadership a large proportion of the original Nissen huts on the western side of the camp were demolished in the 1970s to make way for a 25-metre firing range and assault course. Many huts were repurposed to serve the needs of the training camp, including the conversions of Hut 19 to an armoury, Hut 21 to a chapel and Hut 65 to a mess hall. By 2004, approximately 80 Nissen huts remained in Cultybraggan.

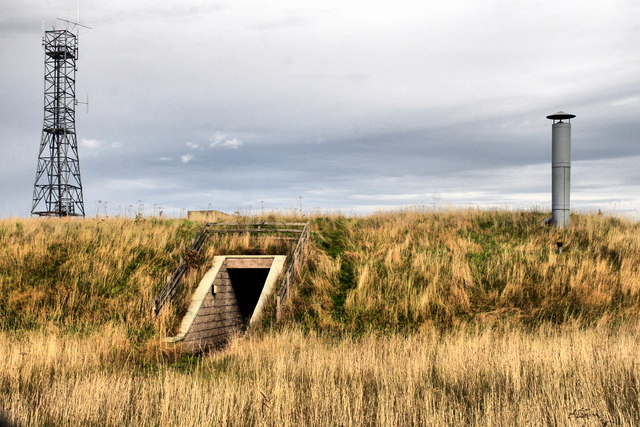
Entrance to the RGHQ bunker within the camp

As part of Britain's response to the Cold War, new structures were built at Cultybraggan. Construction of an underground Royal Observer Corps (ROC) monitoring post began in August 1960. Cultybraggan was selected as the location for a subterranean Regional Government Headquarters (RGHQ) bunker in the late 1980s. Construction of the bunker was completed in 1990 in the north-east of the camp, at a cost of £30 million. The structure was built over two floors – the upper floor hosted an operations room and communication facilities; the lower floor consisted of accommodation, catering facilities and air filtration units. Upon the bunker's completion, it replaced an older RGHQ bunker at RAF Troywood. In the event of a nuclear war, the bunker would have been used by the Scottish Office as a command and control centre. The threat from the Cold War receded soon after the completion of the bunker, rendering these structures obsolete. The monitoring post was closed by 1992 following the disbandment of the ROC. The bunker remained largely unused and was eventually given to the Ministry of Defence.

== Post-military use ==
Historic Scotland describes Cultybraggan as "one of the three best preserved purpose-built WWII prisoner of war camps in Britain". In 2006, a number of structures at the camp were listed. Huts 19, 20, and 44–46 are category A listed as being of national significance, while huts 1–3, 21, 29–39, and 47–57 are category B listed.

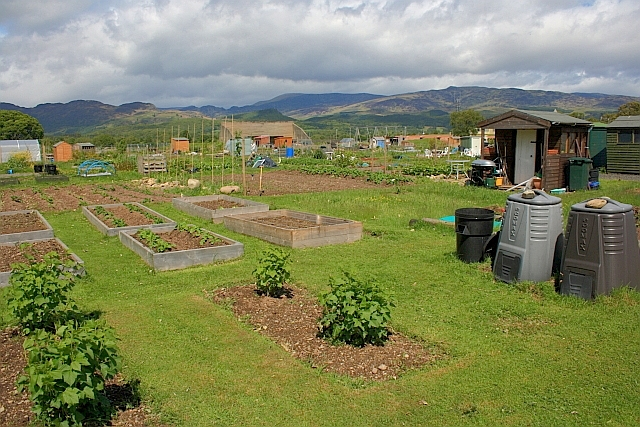
Community allotments at Cultybraggan

The military stopped using Cultybraggan in 2004, and it was sold for £350,000 to the Comrie Development Trust in 2007 through a community right-to-buy scheme. A community orchard was opened in 2010 and a set of allotments have also been built. The trust has received funding for the redevelopment of Nissen huts within the camp, from sources such as the National Lottery Heritage Fund and Historic Scotland. Huts have been converted into self-catering holiday accommodation, including rental accommodation hosted on Airbnb, and as locations for startup companies. The trust imposes low rents on businesses to encourage them to stay in Cultybraggan and take care of the huts they are located in. Cultybraggan has been used to host historical reenactments and in 2014 an exhibition by the Edinburgh College of Art. The former guard house was opened as a museum in 2022.

The RGHQ bunker was sold by the Comrie Development Trust, with funds from the sale used to settle loans taken out for the purchase of the camp. In 2012, the communications firm GCI Communications agreed to purchase the bunker as a "high-security data centre" to store confidential computer files. Following a breakdown in negotiations, the sale was unsuccessful and the bunker was placed back on the market. In 2013, metal thieves stole £300,000 of copper from the bunker and caused £100,000 worth of damage in the process. The thieves were not spotted by the camp's security cameras, having broken in through a farm. The bunker was eventually sold at an auction in April 2014 to the company Bogons, who intended to use it as a long-term data storage facility.

Heinrich Steinmeyer was a member of the Waffen-SS who was captured in August 1944 at Caen. As a member of the SS, he was automatically classified as a "black" prisoner despite him maintaining that he had anti-Nazi views. Steinmeyer was subsequently sent to Cultybraggan, before being moved to Watten in June 1945. Following his death in 2014, Steinmeyer left a bequest of £384,000 from the sale of his house and possessions to Comrie for the “kindness and generosity” he received whilst imprisoned in Cultybraggan. The bequest was given to the Comrie Development Trust to be managed, with Steinmeyer specifying it should be used to support elderly residents of the village.

A 2017 study on the impacts of Cultybraggan as a community-owned site found varying opinions of the camp. Whilst many interviewees had positive opinions of Cultybraggan, and all had some form of connection to it, some expressed unease over the camp given its history with Nazi prisoners. The study also noted that the Comrie Development Trust was struggling to make a profit at the time and had some opposition within the local community.

== See also ==
- List of World War II prisoner-of-war camps in the United Kingdom
