= Le Marchant Barracks =

Former military installation in Devizes, Wiltshire, England

- Devizes
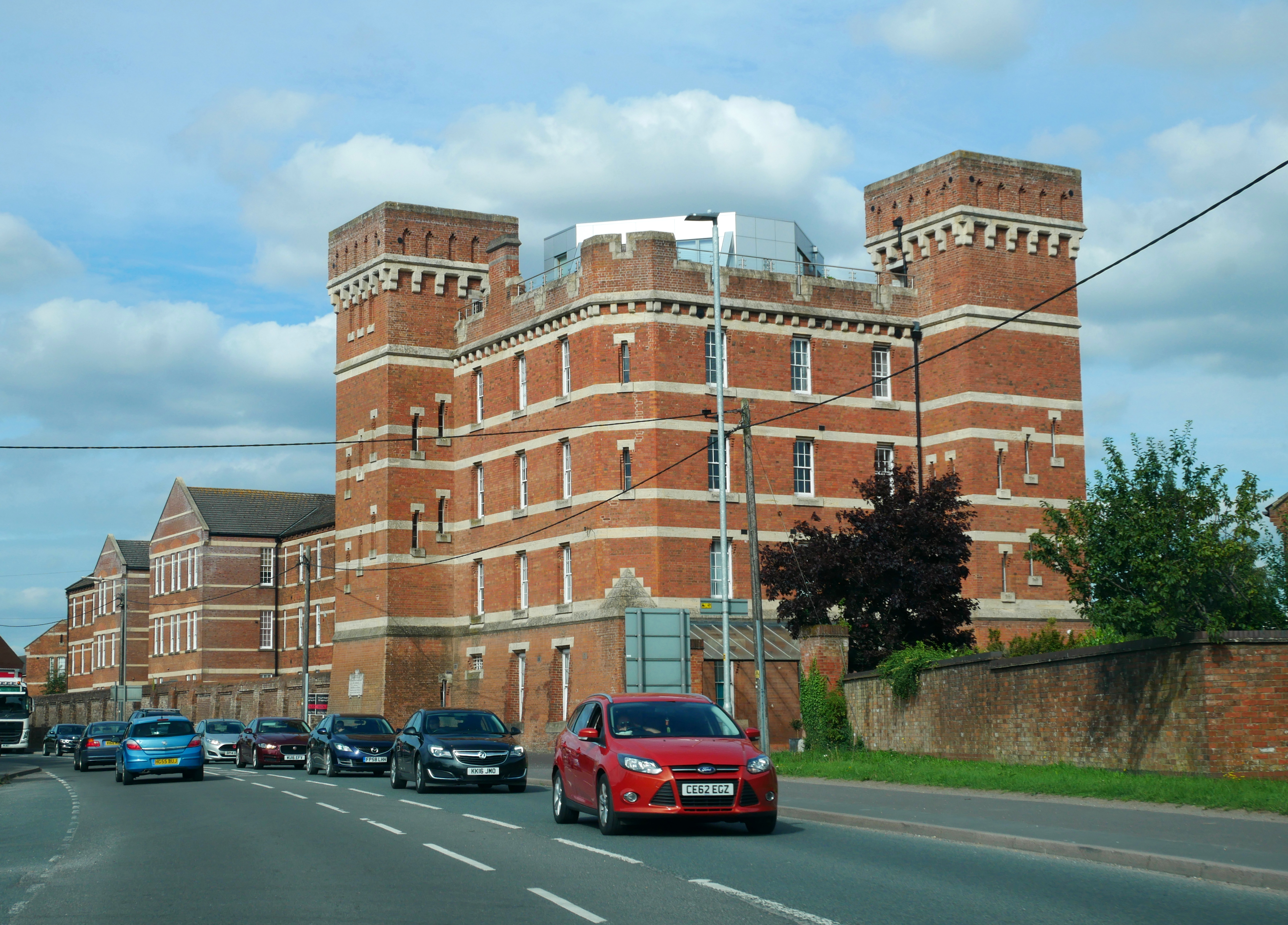
- Le Marchant Barracks

Site information
- Type: Barracks
- Owner: Ministry of Defence
- Operator: British Army

Location
- Location within Wiltshire
- Coordinates: 51°21′42″N 01°58′27″W

Site history
- Built: 1878
- Built for: War Office
- In use: 1878-1967

Garrison information
- Occupants: Wiltshire Regiment (Duke of Edinburgh's)

Le Marchant Barracks is a former military installation in Devizes, Wiltshire, England. The site is within the town's built-up area but within Bishops Cannings parish, on London Road about 1 mile (1.6 km) north-east of the centre of the town.

== History ==
The barracks were built in the Fortress Gothic Revival style and named after Sir John Gaspard Le Marchant in 1878. Their creation took place as part of the Cardwell Reforms which encouraged the localisation of British military forces. The barracks became the depot for the 62nd (Wiltshire) Regiment of Foot and the 99th (Lanarkshire) Regiment of Foot. Following the Childers Reforms, the 62nd and 99th Regiments amalgamated to form the Wiltshire Regiment (Duke of Edinburgh's) with its depot in the barracks in 1881.

During the First World War 5,000 soldiers were processed there and over 3,000 reservists were called up there. Between the Wars, the barracks were the local infantry training centre. During the Second World War, from September 1944 part of the site was a prisoner of war camp, which by the end of that year housed 7,500 German and Italian personnel. In December 1944, it was where the "Devizes Plot" was hatched: this was an attempt at staging a mass escape of PoWs to attack London, stalling the Allied invasion of Germany and turning the tide of the war. The conspirators were later relocated to Cultybraggan Camp, where "black" category prisoners i.e. the more ardent Nazis were imprisoned.

The barracks remained the home of the Wiltshire Regiment until 1959 after which time they were used as a secondary location by the Duke of Edinburgh's Royal Regiment until about 1967. Part of the site was still used as a Territorial Army Centre for the 1st Battalion, Wessex Regiment after the main barracks closed.

== Later uses ==
The keep was sold by the Ministry of Defence in the 1980s and was subsequently used as a warehouse. It was sold again in 2012 and converted for residential use in 2013.

The keep and gatehouse are Grade II listed.
