= Strath Burn (Wick River tributary) =

River in Highland, Scotland

Coordinates: 58°28′N 3°18′W

Strath Burn is a stream which has its source in the Flow Country of Caithness, Scotland, at a height above sea level of around 70 metres, at the confluence of Kensary Burn, and Rowens Burn, and about five kilometres south of the village of Watten.

Strath Burn meanders generally northward across a distance of about four kilometres, with the Moss of Badarclay to its west, to join Scouthal Burn and so form the source of the Wick River, at around 25 metres and about one kilometre south of Watten.
