= A99 road =

Major road in Highland, Scotland

A99

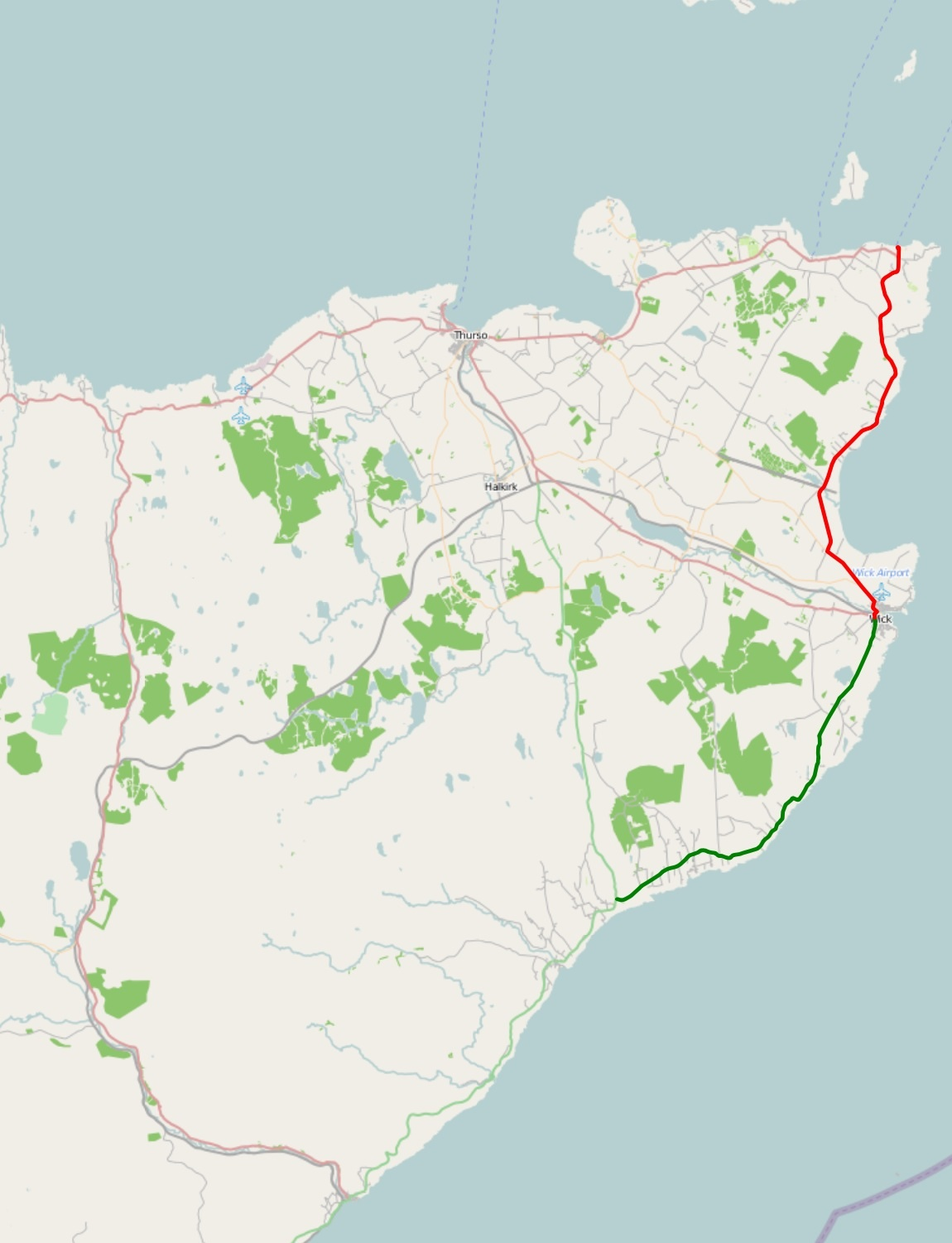
- Click map to enlarge

Major junctions
- South end: Latheron
- A9 A836 A882
- North end: John o' Groats

Location
- Country: United Kingdom
- Primary destinations: Inverness, Wick, John o' Groats

Road network
- Roads in the United Kingdom; Motorways; A and B road zones

The A99 road is entirely within the former county of Caithness in the Highland of Scotland. It runs generally north/northeast from the A9 at Latheron to Wick and to the A836 at John o' Groats. It was part of the A9 until the A9 classification was transferred to what had been the A895-A882 link between Latheron and Thurso. Between Latheron and Wick it follows, mostly, the route of one of Telford's roads.

== Towns, villages and junctions ==
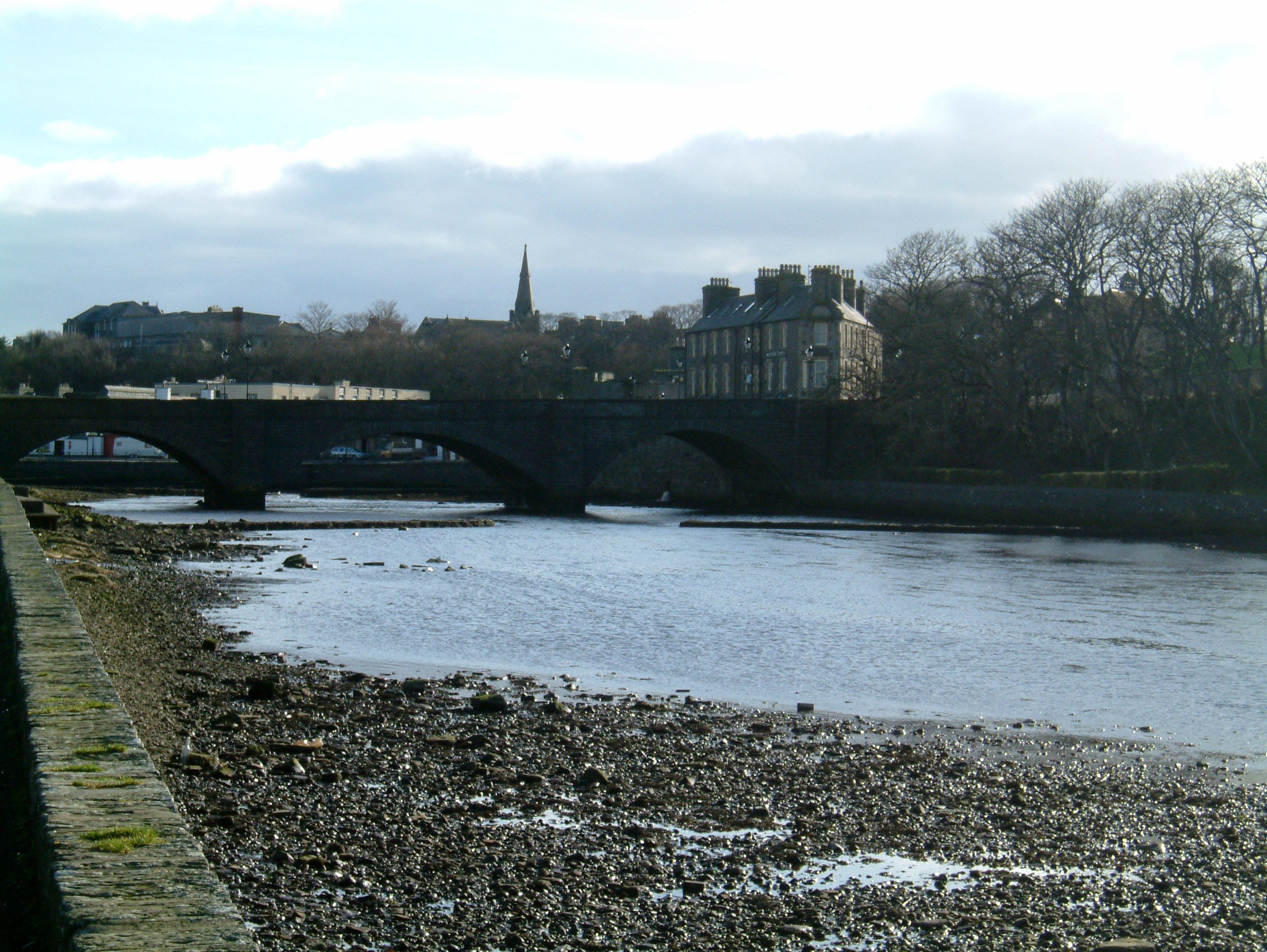
Bridge of Wick carrying the A99 over Wick River

The A99 runs through or near towns and villages listed below. Junctions listed are with other classified roads.

Places and junctions	Ordnance Survey grid references & notes
Latheron, A9	ND199335. From Latheron the A9 runs generally (1) south to Inverness, Perth and Falkirk, and (2) north to Thurso.
Thrumster	ND336452
Wick, A882	ND362506. From Wick the A882 runs west/northwest to the A9 in the Georgemas area.
Lochshell, B874	ND353526. From Lochshell the B874 runs west to a crossroads with the A9 in the Georgemas area, then to Halkirk, and then north to the A9 in Thurso.
Reiss, B876	ND333547. From Reiss the B876 runs northwest to the A836 at Castletown.
John o' Groats, A836	ND380727. From John o' Groats the A836 runs generally west to Castletown, Thurso and Tongue and then south to Lairg and Bonar Bridge then the A9 near Tain.

== Road safety ==
In June 2008, the Road Safety Foundation announced that the most dangerous road in Scotland was the 27 km stretch of the A99 between the A9 at Latheron and Wick. With twelve fatal and serious casualty accidents in three years between 2004 and 2006, the road was one of only four roads in Great Britain rated as Black—the highest risk band—in the EuroRAP report.
