= Earthquake House =

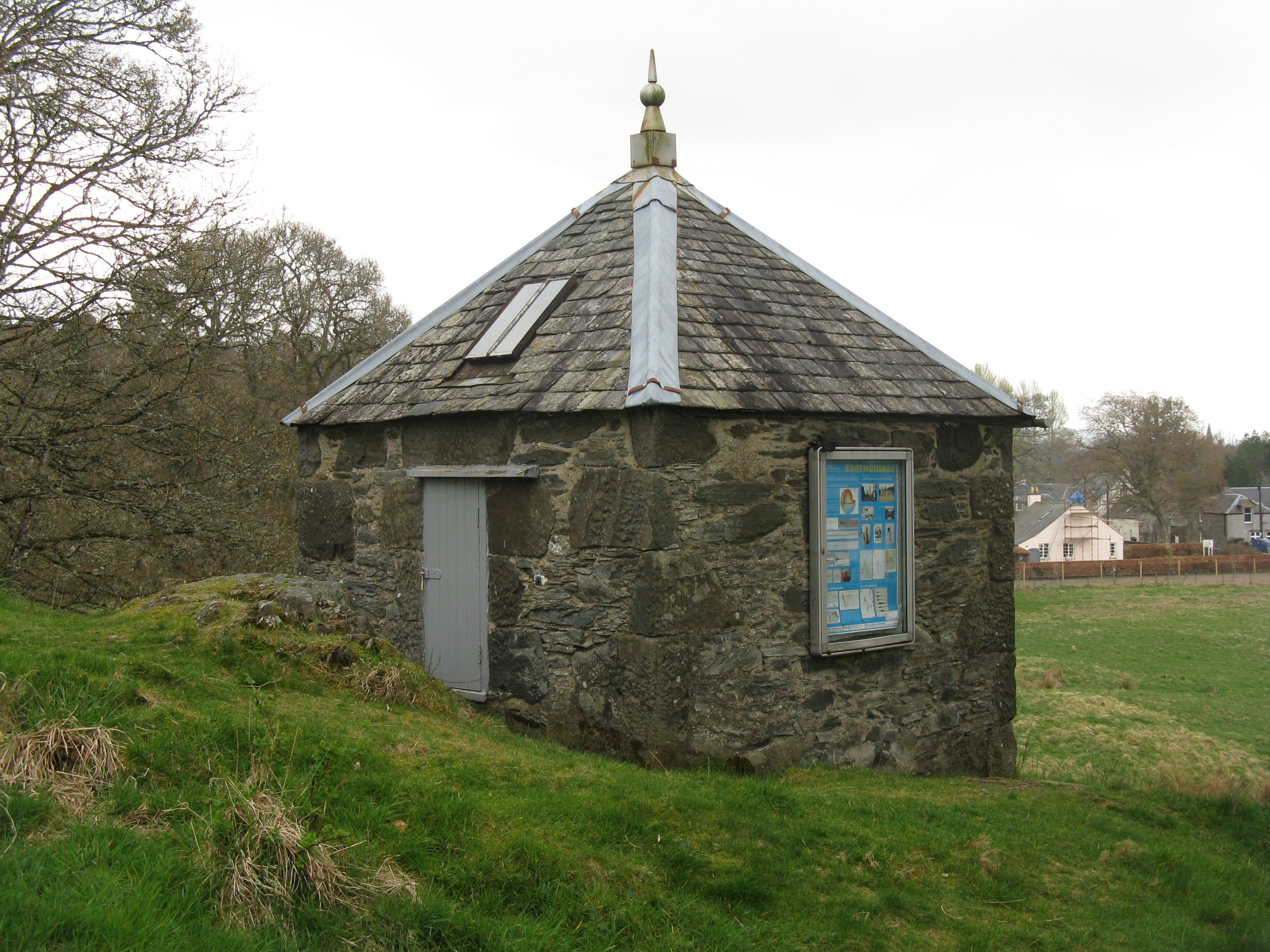
- The Earthquake House from the west

General information
- Architectural style: Observation station
- Location: Ross, Dalginross, Comrie, Perth and Kinross, Scotland
- Coordinates: 56.371923°N 4.000851°W
- Year built: 1872

The Earthquake House, on the outskirts of the village of Comrie, in Perth and Kinross, Scotland, was the first dedicated earthquake observatory in the world. Comrie lies on the Highland Boundary Fault and suffers more tremors and quakes than anywhere else in the United Kingdom. The first modern seismometer was invented in Comrie in 1840 and the building put up 32 years later to house it, on land belonging to Mr Drummond of Drumearn, which he granted free of charge.

By 1911 the building was redundant, and, although restored and re-commissioned in 1988 with modern equipment, it is not open to visitors; however a window does allow a glimpse inside.
