= Wick River =

River in Highland (Council Area), Scotland

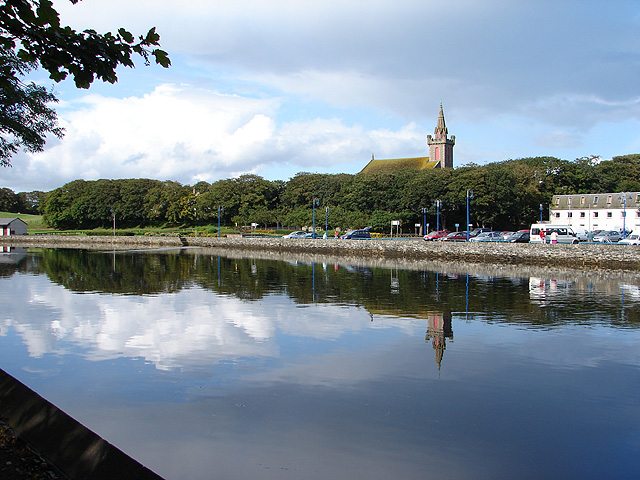
- The Wick River in Wick.

Physical characteristics
- Source
  - coordinates: 58°27′50″N 03°18′11″W
- Mouth
  - location: Bay of Wick
  - coordinates: 58°26′32″N 03°05′18″W

Wick River, known also as River Wick, is a river in Caithness in Highland, Scotland. It has its source at the confluence of Scouthal Burn and Strath Burn near Achingale Mill at the northern end of Bardarclay Moss (grid reference ND 24070 53578) in the Flow Country. The river estuary (ND 36571 50934), is in the North Sea bay of Wick (ND378505) and is straddled by the town of Wick. The river flows for 10 miles (16 km) south-eastwards and empties into Wick Bay.

The river basin includes Loch Watten and Loch Tofingall (ND190522) to the west of the estuary, and Loch Hempriggs and the Loch of Yarrows (ND309438) to the south/southwest.

== Tributaries ==
Viewed upstream from the estuary, the river and its tributaries can be listed as follows:

- Wick River
  - Burn of Newton
    - Loch Hempriggs
      - Burn of Thrumster
        - Loch of Yarrows
  - Burn of Gillock
  - Achairn Burn
    - Alt Beag-airighe
    - Camster Loch
    - Toftgunn headwaters
  - Burn of Winless (Loch of Winless)
  - Loch Burn, Watten
    - Loch Watten
  - Scouthal Burn
    - Burn of Acharole
      - Loch Burn (Toftingall)
        - Loch of Toftingall
  - Strath Burn
    - Kensary Burn
    - Camster Burn, known also as Rowens Burn

== Estuary ==
The Wick River estuary ranges from the vicinity of Wick Harbour (ND370508) to an area about 2.5 kilometres inland (ND346517).

On both sides of the estuary, areas of Wick are built on artificial embankment which have narrowed the river channel, or have fixed a channel where otherwise the area would be more that of tidal beach.

== Bridges ==
The river is spanned by one railway, three roads and two footbridges. In order from the sea, they are:

- Within Wick (ND365509), the Harbour Bridge spans the river at its mouth, to link Wick town centre with Wick Harbour and Pulteneytown. It stands instead of the earlier Service Bridge.
- Also in Wick (ND363509), the river is spanned by the main road linking John o' Groats with Latheron and Inverness (the A99-A9). The bridge here is known as the Bridge of Wick and it carries an extension of Wick's Bridge Street.
- Around 500 metres west of the Bridge of Wick (ND358510), a footbridge spans the river via an island in the river, and this serves as a link between recreational meadows on the north and south banks.
- About halfway between the footbridge and the railway bridge there is another footbridge.
- Around 300 metres east of Mary Ford (ND328523), the river is crossed by the railway which links the burgh of Wick with the burgh of Thurso and the city of Inverness.
- In Watten (ND244543), the river is crossed by the main highway, A882, linking Wick with Thurso, known as Achingale Bridge.
