= Comrie, Perth and Kinross =

Highland Town in Scotland

Comrie: Scottish Gaelic: Comaraidh
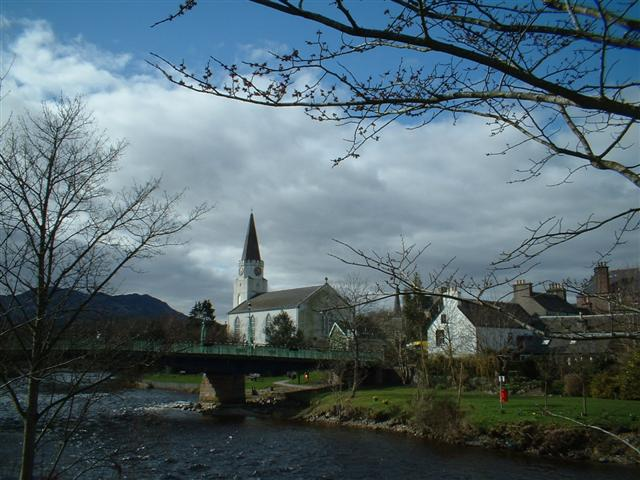
- Comrie

- Location within Perth and Kinross
- Population: 1,900 (2020)
- OS grid reference: NN773219
- Council area: Perth and Kinross
- Lieutenancy area: Perth and Kinross
- Country: Scotland
- Sovereign state: United Kingdom
- Post town: Crieff
- Postcode district: PH6
- Dialling code: 01764
- Police: Scotland
- Fire: Scottish
- Ambulance: Scottish
- UK Parliament: Perth and Kinross-shire
- Scottish Parliament: Perthshire South and Kinross-shire
- Website: /www.comrie.org.uk

Comrie (/ˈkʌmri/; Scottish Gaelic: Comaraidh; Pictish: Aberlednock; Latin: Victoria) is a village and parish in the southern Highlands of Scotland, towards the western end of the Strathearn district of Perth and Kinross, 7 mi (11 km) west of Crieff.

Comrie is a historic conservation village in a national scenic area along the River Earn. The village's position on the Highland Boundary Fault causes it to experience more tremors than anywhere else in Britain, thus, it is nicknamed the "Shaky Toun" or Am Baile Critheanach in Gaelic. The parish is twinned with Carleton Place in Ontario, Canada.

== Location and etymology ==
Comrie lies within the registration county of Perthshire (Gaelic: Siorrachd Pheairt) and the Perth and Kinross local council area. The name Comrie derives from the original Gaelic name con-ruith or comh-ruith (from con/comh 'together', and ruith "to run", "running") translating literally as "running together", but more accurately as "flowing together" or "the place where rivers meet". In modern Gaelic the name is more often transcribed as Comaraidh, Cuimridh or Cuimrigh. This is apt as the village sits at the confluence of three rivers.

The River Ruchill (Scottish Gaelic: Abhainn Rùchail) and the River Lednock (Allt Liadnaig) are both tributaries of the Earn (Uisge Èireann) at Comrie, which itself eventually feeds into the Tay (Uisge Tatha).

Due to its position astride the Highland Boundary Fault, Comrie undergoes frequent earth tremors and has an old nickname of "Shaky Toun/Toon" (Scots) or 'Am Baile Critheanach' (Gaelic). In the 1830s around 7,300 tremors were recorded and today Comrie records earth tremors more often and to a higher intensity than anywhere else in the United Kingdom. Comrie became the site of one of the world's first seismometers in 1840, and a functional replica is still housed in the Earthquake House in The Ross in Comrie. The position of Comrie on the Highland Boundary Fault also gives the village a claim to the contested title of Gateway to the Highlands. To the north of the village, Ben Chonzie and the Grampian Mountains rise majestically, while to the south of the village broad open moorland is joined by lesser mountains and glens that provide a wide range of terrain and ecology.

== History ==
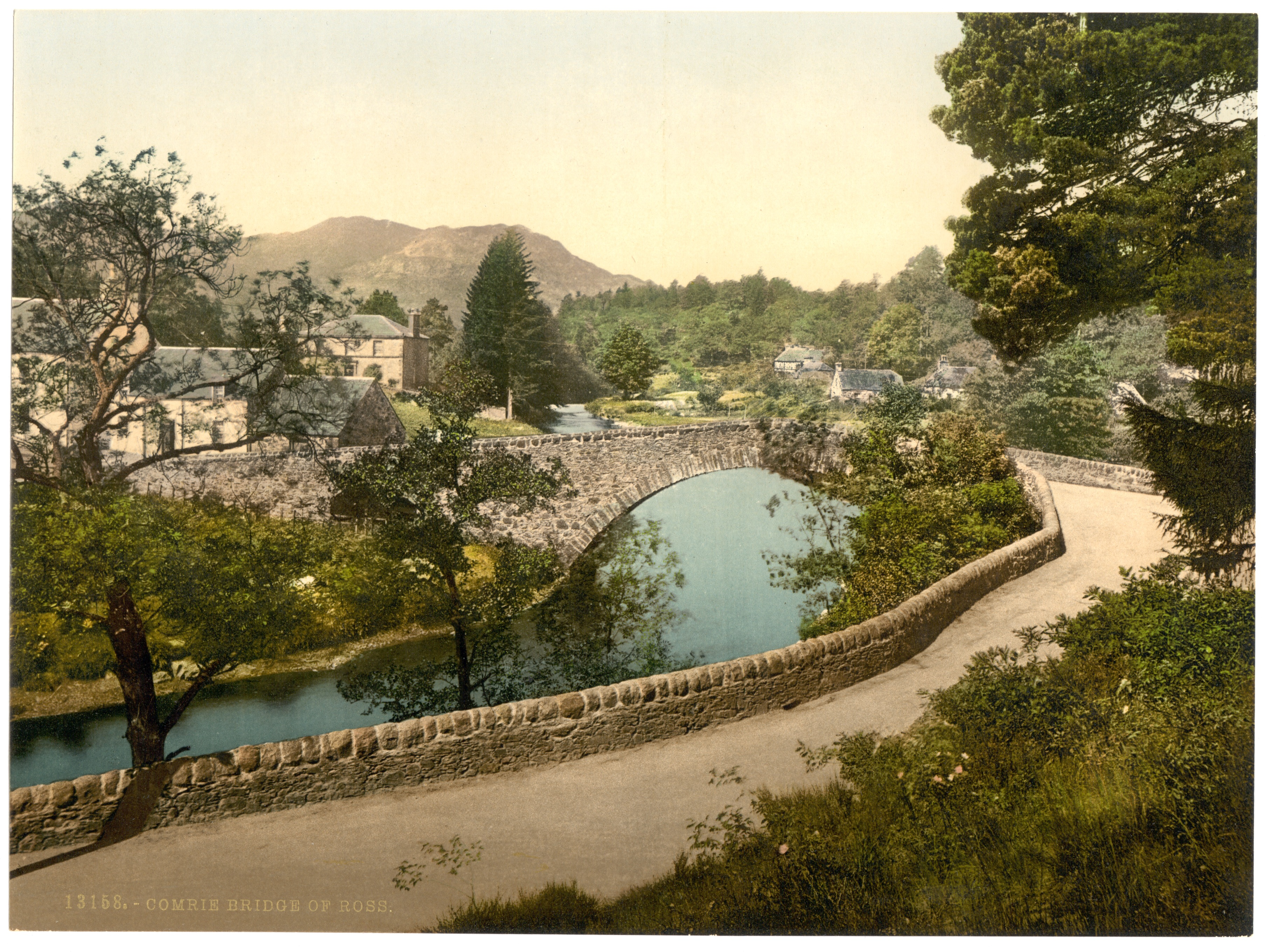
Bridge of Ross, ca. 1890 - 1900.

There is significant evidence of prehistoric habitation of the area, marked by numerous standing stones and archaeological remains that give insight into the original prehistoric, Pictish and later Celtic societies that lived here.

In AD 79, the Roman General Agricola chose what are now the outskirts of Comrie as the site for a fort and temporary marching camp, due to the area's strategic position on the southern fringe of the Highlands. It is one of the line of so-called "Glen blocking" forts running from Drumquhassle to Stracathro and including the legionary fortress of Inchtuthil. The temporary camp was c. 22 acre (c. 9 ha) in size. An infamous battle between the Celts and Romans is known to have occurred on the unidentified mountain Mons Graupius. The area around Comrie, Strathearn, is one of several proposed battle sites.

James V of Scotland came to Comrie and Cultybraggan regularly in September to hunt deer. Records survive of the food he consumed included bread, ale and fish sent from Stirling. His consort Mary of Guise and her ladies in waiting also came to the hunting in Glenartney. A "Hunt Hall" for the use of Mary, Queen of Scots, was built in Glenartney by James Stewart, 1st Lord Doune in August 1563.

Comrie's early prosperity derived from weaving. This was mostly done as domestic piecework. Comrie was also important as a droving town. Cattle destined for the markets of the Scottish Lowlands and ultimately England would be driven south from their grazing areas in the Highlands. River crossings, such as at Comrie, were important staging posts on the way south. Much of the land around Comrie was owned by the Drummond family, Earls of Perth, latterly Earls of Ancaster, whose main seat was Drummond Castle, south of Crieff. Another branch of the Drummonds owned Drummondernoch (Gaelic: Drumainn Èireannach – Drummond of Ireland), to the west of the town. Aberuchill Castle, however, just outside Comrie was originally a Campbell seat.

Over the years the village has grown to incorporate many smaller satellite settlements, including The Ross (Gaelic: An Ros) a small settlement to the west of the village contained within a river peninsula (An Ros literally translates as peninsula) which became more accessible when the Ross Bridge was constructed in 1792. Before that the peninsula was only reached by a river ford. Similarly, the once isolated communities in the surrounding glens and mountains, such as Invergeldie in Glen Lednock and Dalchruin in Glen Artney, have generally come to be seen as part of Comrie village. Previously, they existed as small isolated settlements – for instance, Glen Lednock contained 21 different settlements of 350 individual structures and 25 corn-drying kilns. However, these exclusively Gaelic-speaking hamlets were largely eviscerated by the Highland Clearances of the 18th and 19th centuries. The first earthquake reported in Scottish history occurred in Comrie in 1801; two farmworkers were killed when a barn collapsed during the earthquake.

Comrie underwent something of a renaissance in the early 19th century and Victorian periods as an attractive location for wealthy residents and visitors, an image which has been maintained to this day. This popularity helped to bring the railway in 1893, when the Caledonian Railway completed a branch line from Crieff. The line was later extended to meet the Callander and Oban Railway at Lochearnhead. The Comrie–Lochearnhead line was closed in 1951 and the Comrie–Crieff line in 1964, due largely to the improved road network in the area.

Comrie's mountainous setting with abundant streams and lochs brought a number of hydro-electric power plants into the area in the earlier 20th century. A dam was built in Glen Lednock and water piped to another plant from Loch Earn in the west.

Today Comrie is an attractive retirement village, recording the highest proportion of over-65s in Scotland in the 1991 census. Its economy is supplemented by adventure and wildlife tourism. Like other Highland villages, it has seen an influx of residents in recent decades. Some have bought buy-to-let and second-home conversions, which has tended to raise housing prices and cause tensions with locals. Even so, Comrie retains its spirit, traditions and community feel.

== Sights and culture ==
=== Architecture ===
The White Church, the former parish kirk, is Comrie's most striking building, with a prominent tower and spire by the roadside of the ancient churchyard at the heart of the village. This is an early Christian site, dedicated to an obscure early saint, Kessog or Mokessog, who may have flourished in the 8th century. Comrie Parish Church is of a grand Gothic style, disproportionate to anything else in the village, and dominates the distant skyline. It was designed and built in 1881 by George T Ewing. Comrie is also graced by a little-known Charles Rennie Mackintosh building, a shop in the main street with a first floor corner turret built in a version of the Scottish vernacular style (not visible in the above illustration).

Some of the buildings and homes in the village date back centuries, with many traditional Highland cottages built in dry-stone and/or clay and originally roofed in thatch. In the higher mountain glens around the village, traditional Highland blackhouses, most now in ruins, can also be found. There are a number of grand estate homes and historic castles in the area. For the most part, however, the main quadrants of the village house Victorian and Edwardian buildings, including many large detached villas and small terraces. The newer parts of the village are dominated by modern properties from the 1950s onward, including extremely modern properties of varying character.

=== Awards ===
The village won the Royal Horticultural Society "Large Village Britain in Bloom award" in 2007 and 2010. It also won awards in the 2009 Beautiful Scotland Campaign, including Best Village and a special award for Continuous Community Involvement. In 2013 Comrie won gold in the village category of the Beautiful Scotland Awards and a special Community Horticulture Award.

=== Glen Lednock, The Monument and the Deil's Cauldron ===
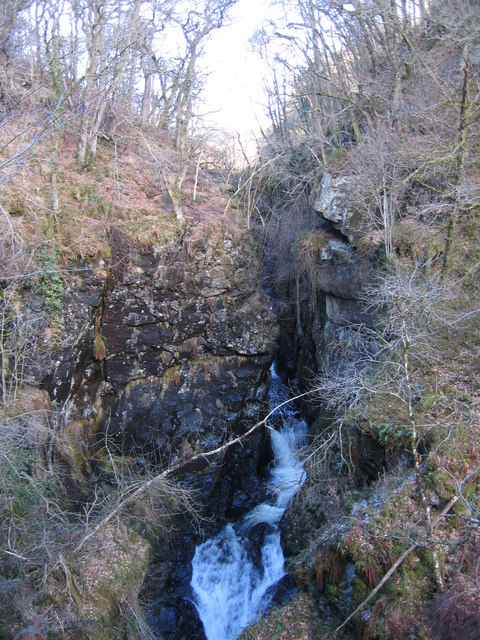
River Lednock passing through De'il's Cauldron located at 56.38856°N 3.99714°W

A granite obelisk atop Dùn Mòr (English: Great Hill) to the north commemorates Henry Dundas, 1st Viscount Melville. It was designed by James Gillespie Graham in 1812. This monument is reached via a woodland trail through wooded Glen Lednock (Gaelic: Gleann Leathad Cnoc) in which is found the Slocha'n Donish or De'ils Cauldron (also known as the Falls of Lednock).

The trail begins in the village, at Laggan Park (Gaelic: An Làgan Mòr – The Great Basin) and ascends through a native forest of pines, oak, elm, ash rowan, alder and beech to Glen Lednock. Via The Shaky Bridge (although the original shaky bridge was replaced with a decidedly less shaky successor), hikers are treated to a splendid view of the glen, a truly Highland landscape, where a single-lane road leads up to Glen Lednock Reservoir and the Munro, Ben Chonzie. From there Dùn Mòr and the Monument are easily reached, offering unparalleled views across Strathearn and further west to the central Highlands.

A swift descent (or ascent depending on the route chosen) leads through a long, steep, wooded gorge containing the impressive De'il's Cauldron. Here the river has cut a high, cascading waterfall in the surrounding rock, with pools below resembling a boiling cauldron. It is said that a water-elf, Uris-chidh, lives here and tries to lure victims into the treacherous waters. The path down leads to a lesser companion to the great falls, The Wee Cauldron, with a calmer view of the river. The path through the forest eventually returns to the village.

=== Prisoner of war camp ===
To the south of the village is a military camp at nearby Cultybraggan. During World War II, this was POW Camp 21 for Italian and later German prisoners of war. This was a "black" camp as most of its inmates were ardent Nazis. It became infamous after anti-Nazi German POW Wolfgang Rosterg was lynched there by fellow inmates, who were hanged after the war for the act. Many more difficult Nazis were moved to POW Camp 165 at Watten in Caithness.

The camp grounds have a two-storey nuclear bunker (Cultybraggan RGHQ), the proposed site for a provincial Scottish government in case of nuclear attack. Even in the 1990s the bunker had accommodation, a telephone exchange, a sewage plant and a BBC studio. In 2007 a local community trust bought the camp and the surrounding 90 acres (36 hectares) of land, under Land Reform legislation, for the sum of £350,000.

In December 2016 Heinrich Steinmeyer, a former Waffen-SS prisoner of the camp until 1948, left Comrie £384,000 in his will, as an expression of "my gratitude to the people of Scotland for the kindness and generosity that I have experienced in Scotland during my imprisonment of war and hereafter." A local trust manages the legacy.

=== Notable sights ===
- Ben Chonzie (Gaelic: Beinn a' Chòinnich) – a mountain and Munro that overlooks the village, known for its many mountain hares
- Cultybraggan (Gaelic: possibly Cul taigh bracan) – an ancient farming site, and site of the once-secret underground nuclear bunker and, dating from 1941, one of two high-security prisoner of war (POW) camps in Britain
- Linn a' chullaich (English: Pool of the Boar) – a deep freshwater pool still commonly used for wild swimming in the summer months, known locally as The Lynn
- The Deil's Cauldron (Gaelic: Slocha'n Donish, English: The Devil's Kettle) – a deep rock waterfall where there resides a legendary water-elf called Uris-chidh, who lures victims to a watery death
- The Earthquake House (Gaelic: An taigh crith-fuinn) – a small research station housing one of the world's first seismometers, still active today
- Tullichettle (Gaelic: Tulach a' chadal, English: The knoll/mound of sleep) – an ancient churchyard
- Auchingarrich (Gaelic: Achadh an gàradh, English: Field of the garden) – An ancient farming site. Now home to a wildlife centre
- Loch Earn (Gaelic: Loch Éireann) – A beautiful freshwater loch surrounded by mountains.
- Ben Vorlich (Loch Earn) (Gaelic: Beinn Mhùrlaig) – A nearby mountain and Munro.
- Fort Victoria (Gaelic: An Gearasdan Borgach)) – The remains of a Roman 'glen-blocking' fort. This site is considered by some the furthest north that the Romans were able to invade Scotland.
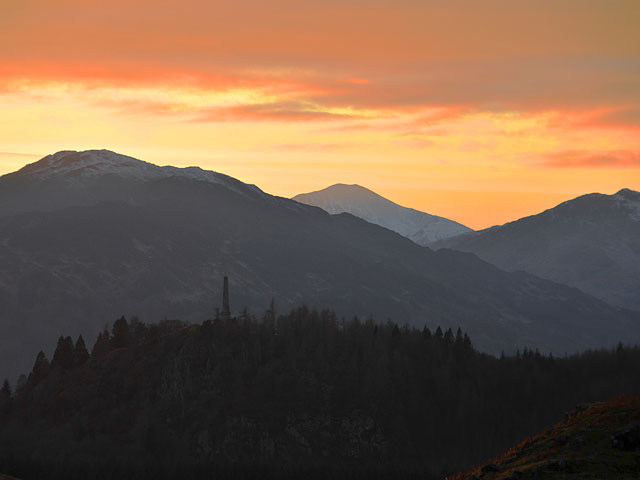
  Lord Melville's monument
- Standing stones (Gaelic: Na tursachan) – A number of standing stones are relics of the pre-Christian Celtic and Pictish societies which once inhabited the area.
- Melville Monument (Gaelic: Carragh Melville) – A 72-foot granite obelisk which sits on a high, steep, craggy hillside overlooking the village. Built to commemorate First Lord Melville Henry Dundas
- Dundas Monument (Gaelic: Carragh Dhùn Deas) – A similar, but smaller obelisk to the east of the village
- Glen Artney (Gaelic: Gleann Artanaig) (English: This may be Artanag's glen, a name based on old Gaelic art, meaning bear) – A beautiful glen and ancient royal deer forest immortalised in Sir Walter Scott's The Lady of the Lake (poem), it supplied venison to the Sovereigns of Scotland at Holyrood, Dunfermline and Falkland.
- Glen Lednock (Gaelic: Gleann Leathad Cnoc) (English: The Glen of the wooden knoll) – A beautiful highland glen in the mountains above the village, once home to a smaller community prior to the Highland Clearances. The glen holds a great stock of wildlife, including elusive Scottish wildcat and capercaillie, golden eagle, buzzard, mountain hare, grouse and number of deer species.
- Sput Rolla (English: The spout of the scroll) – A waterfall which breaks the River Lednock as it flows down from the mountains in Glen Lednock to the village.
- Lawers House (Gaelic: Taigh Labhar) – A grand estate home to the east of the village.
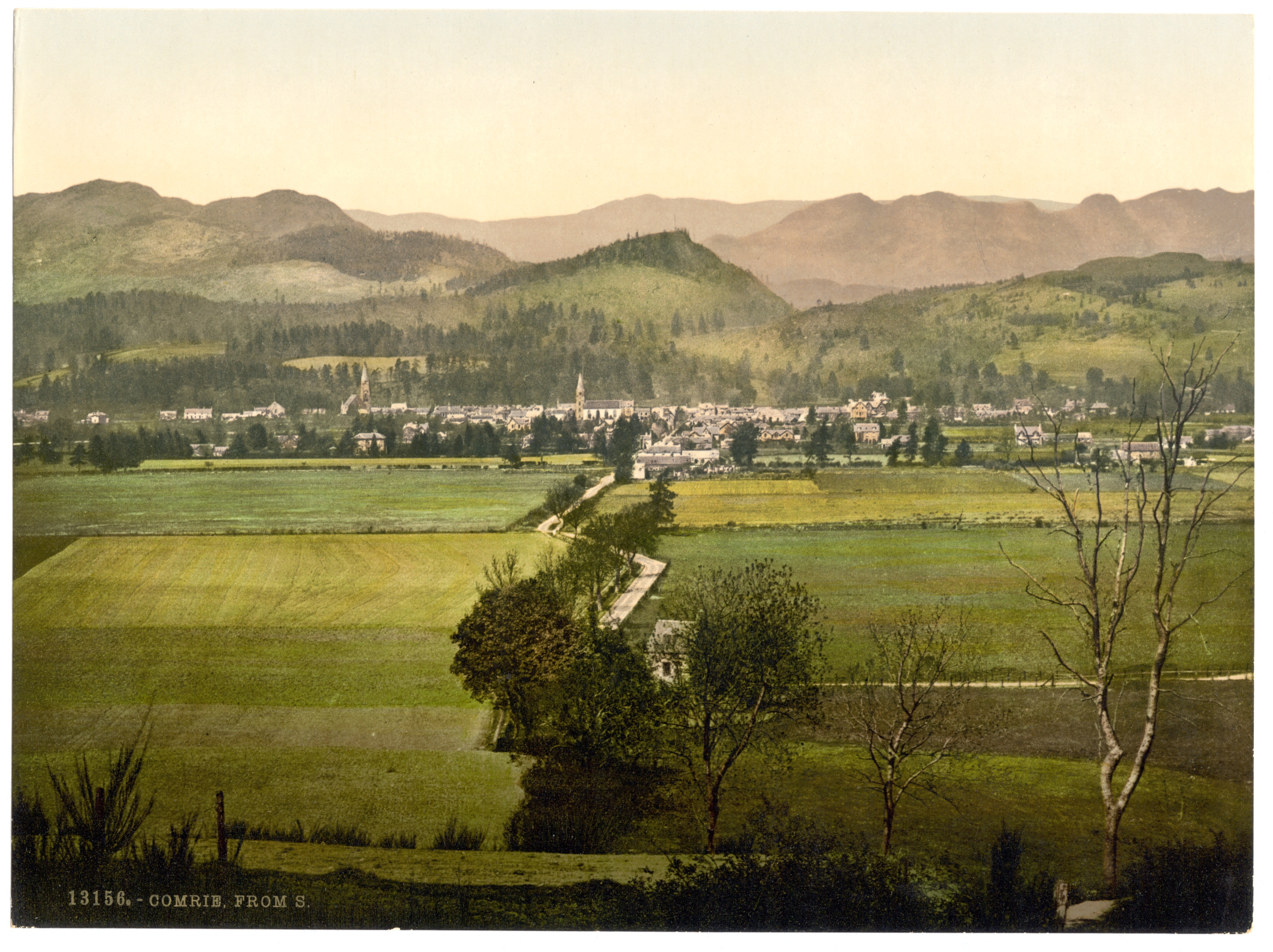
  Old image of Comrie from the south
- St Kessog's Free Church of Scotland (Gaelic: An t-eaglais Naomh Cais-Òg) – A grand church built in 1879 which replaced the smaller Free Church (White Church)
- The White Church (Scottish Gaelic: An t-Eaglais gheal) – Built in 1805 on the site of another ancient churchyard. The centrepiece of the village and a category A listed building. Now a community centre.
- Brough and Macpherson shop – A building re-designed by Charles Rennie Mackintosh in 1903 following a fire.
- The House of Ross (Gaelic: An Taigh Ros) – A grand estate home constructed in 1908 in the 18th-century Scots vernacular style. The home is now subdivided into a number of separate dwellings. The estate grounds contain an extensive miniature railway which is opened to the public several times a year.
- Aberuchill Castle (Gaelic: Caisteal Obar Ruadh thuill) (English: The castle at the mouth of the red flood) – A grand castle and estate home initially constructed in 1602 at the foot of the hills of Ruchill. The castle is now owned by Vladimir Lisin, a Russian industrialist and billionaire and according to Forbes magazine the richest man in Russia. The castle has played host to many infamous characters of Scottish and world fame historically and to the present day.
- Dunira (Gaelic: Dùn Iar-a) Castle and estates – A grand estate and home west of the village.

== Amenities ==
Comrie has a number of amenities, which include a primary school, a post office, two hotels ("The Comrie Hotel" and "The Royal Hotel", each of which contain their own restaurant and bar), five churches of various denominations, two small cafés (one also the local fish and chip shop), a restaurant ('The De'il's Cauldron'), and an independent petrol station.

== Transport ==
=== Train ===
The railway to Perth was closed in 1964 by British Railways under the Beeching cuts.

=== Bus ===
Buses services are run by Stagecoach South Scotland to St Fillians or Perth. As of April 2026, service 15 runs between St Fillians (Once a day) and to Perth (Every 2 Hours).

== Flambeaux parade and Hogmanay ==
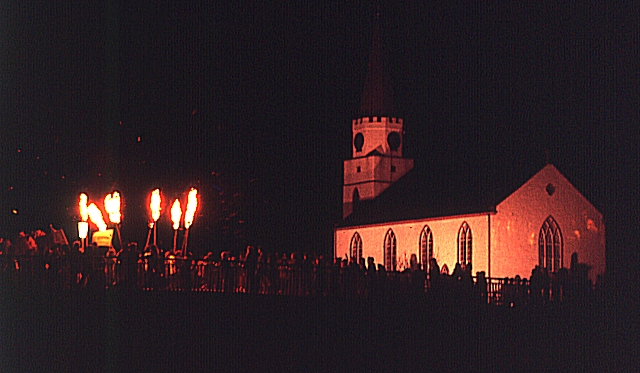
Hogmanay flambeaux fire festival with the white church visible in background

Comrie has a curious Hogmanay ritual: on the stroke of midnight, a torchlight procession marches through the village. Traditionally the procession involves the twelve strongest men of the village carrying long, thick birch poles, to which burning tarred rags are attached and taken to each of the four corners of the village. The procession is usually accompanied by the village pipe band and villagers with floats and dressed in costume.

After the procession the torches are thrown from the Dalginross Bridge into the River Earn. The origins of the ceremony are unclear. It is generally assumed to have pre-Christian Celtic or possibly Pictish roots and to be intended to cleanse the village of evil spirits in advance of the new year (albeit the new year's commencing in January is a relatively modern convention). The use of the birch tree specifically may have significance as the first letter of the Celtic Ogham alphabet, and a symbol of new beginning.

The spectacle attracts thousands of visitors to the small highland village each Hogmanay. A countdown to midnight is usually held at Melville Square and after the processions people gather here again for traditional Scottish music and dancing. Drinking alcohol in the street is commonplace and tolerated. Parties in village homes are common and other Scottish Hogmanay traditions like first footing are also observed.

== Comrie Fortnight ==
An annual two-week festival, called the Comrie Fortnight, is held in the village during July and August. The Comrie Fortnight started in the late 1960s and has evolved over the years, now consisting of a wide range of activities including competitions, outings, dances and a float parade. Profits from the Comrie Fortnight are used to support events and groups in the local community.

== Language ==
Today the principal languages of Comrie are English, Gaelic and Scots.

Historically, Comrie and the surrounding area were part of the Gàidhealtachd. A 1799 statistical account of Comrie Parish states, "The common language of the people is Gaelic and all the natives understand it; but many, especially the old, do not understand English." Gaelic appears to have remained the primary language in the early part of the 19th century, as testified by this 1828 passage by Mr Mushet, local minister at the time, describing the annual celebration of the sacrament of the lord's supper:

"The Lord favoured us (blessed be His name) with fair and seasonable weather. We had near eleven tables in Irish (Gaelic). Each table contained forty-eight persons or thereabout, and we had only two tables and some few persons at the third in English".

As with the rest of Scotland however, the process of language shift away from Gaelic and towards English, facilitated by the Highland Clearances and the Education (Scotland) Act 1872, was apparently well established by the late 19th century. Indeed, by 1891 census estimates suggested that only 17.9 per cent of Comrie's population were native Gaelic speakers. In 1901 only 8.3 per cent of the population were native Gaelic speakers, while only 4.5 per cent had Gaelic as their sole language. The most recent census data for 2002 shows that less than 5 per cent are Gaelic speakers.

The decline of Gaelic in the area can be attributed largely to The Highland Clearances (Scottish Gaelic: Fuadach nan Gàidheal) in the 18th and 19th centuries, which saw people in the smaller satellite settlements of the village (located in the surrounding mountains and glens) forcibly displaced from their homes, and many forced to emigrate to Canada, Australasia and North America. In addition, the Education (Scotland) Act 1872 led to generations of Gaels forbidden from speaking their native language in the classroom, and punished for doing so. As with the rest of Scotland (excluding the north-west), Gaelic speakers have struggled to retain their language through the generations, though Comrie retains a larger than average number of speakers.

A major challenge to the preservation of Gaelic in the local area has been the lack of Gaelic Medium Education or Gaelic as a second language offered by Perth and Kinross Council at Comrie Primary School. The nearest Gaelic Medium Education units are at Aberfeldy (30 miles by road) or Goodlyburn Primary School in Perth City (25 miles by road).

== Notable people ==
In alphabetical order:

- Carly Booth (born 1992), professional golfer, was born and lives in Comrie.
- Robert Burns (1759–1796), Scotland's renowned national poet, spent case time at Aberuchill Castle.
- John Craig (1896–1970), recipient of the Victoria Cross
- Vladimir Lisin (born 1956), the richest living Russian according to Forbes magazine, owns and occupies Aberuchill Castle in Comrie. His guests have included the King of Spain.
- James Drummond MacGregor (1759–1830) was from Comrie and became the first Gaelic-speaking Presbyterian minister in Nova Scotia in 1786.
- James Redheuch of Tullichettle (died 1541), Comptroller of Scotland and Comrie lanowner
- Alexander Trees, Baron Trees (born 1946), is a professor of veterinary parasitology and Crossbench member of the House of Lords, under the title Lord Trees of The Ross (a street on the western edge of the village).

== Comrie Golf Club ==
Comrie Golf Club was founded in 1891 and lies on the outskirts of the village of Comrie.

== Image gallery ==
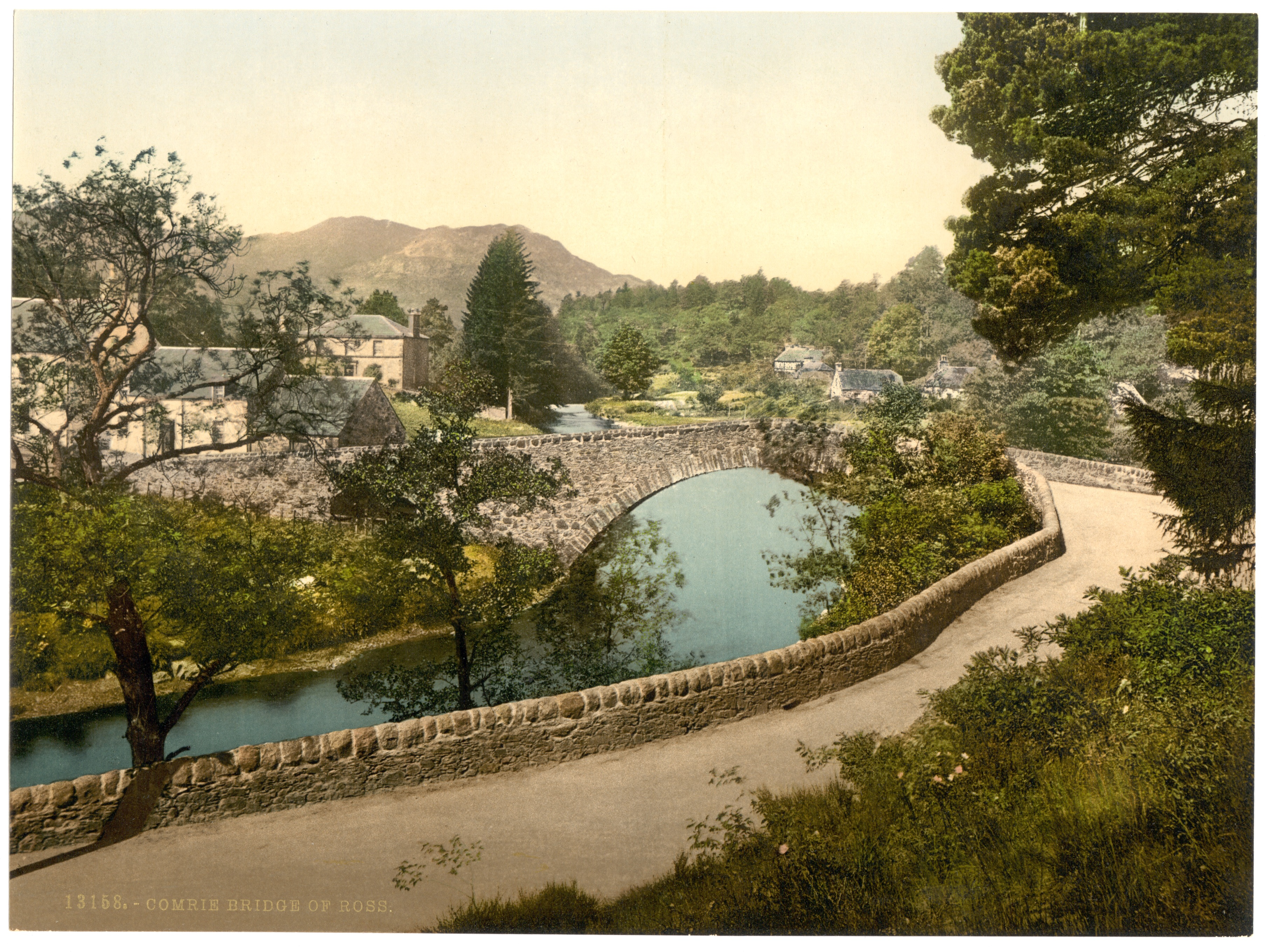

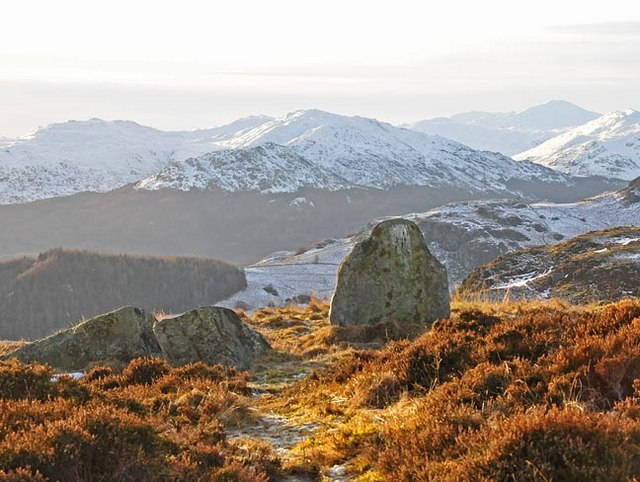

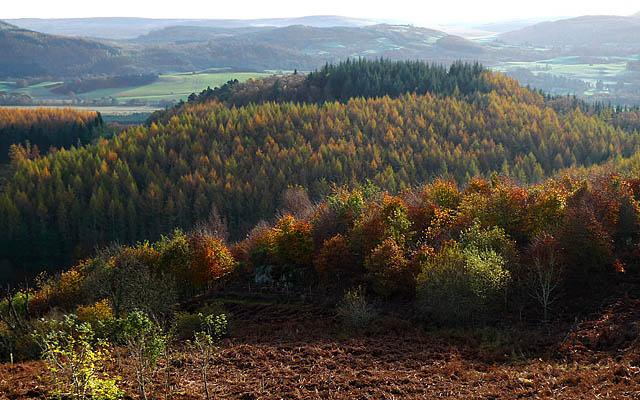

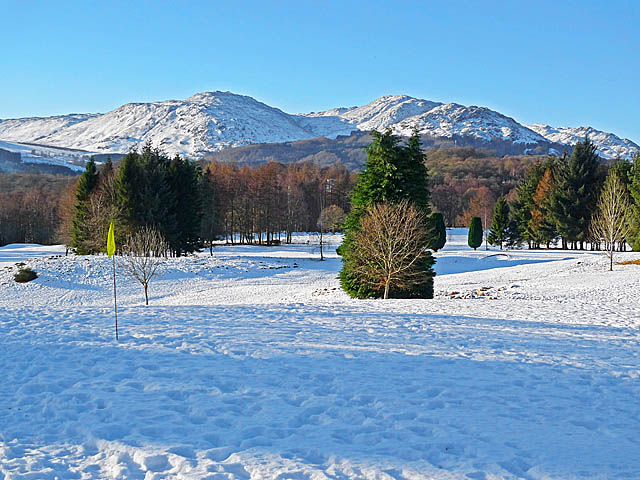
