= Loch Watten =

Lake in Caithness, Scotland

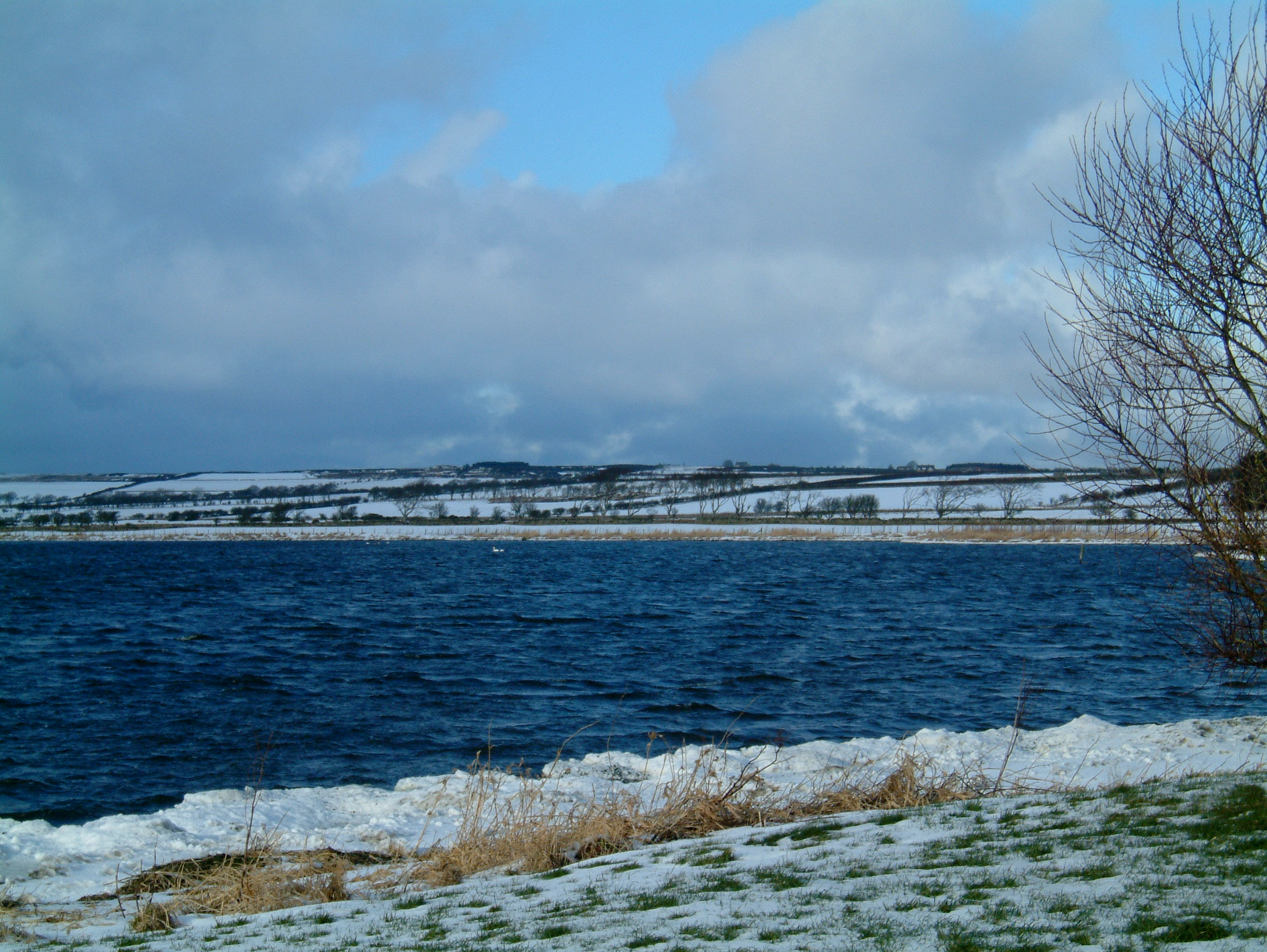

- Location within Highland
- Location: Caithness
- Coordinates: 58°29′25″N 3°19′46″W
- Type: freshwater loch
- Basin countries: Scotland

Loch Watten is a natural loch in the River Wick drainage basin in Caithness, Scotland.

== Name ==
The name is almost a tautology, but not perfectly: The word "loch" (of Gaelic origin) means "lake", of course. The Norse word vatn means "water", in general, including terms like brunn-vatn ("fountain water") and regn-vatn ("rain water"), but is also found in the names of several lakes, such as Þingvallavatn and Myvatn in Iceland, and Røssvatnet and Møsvatn in Norway, similar to some English naming customs, e. g. Kielder Water. In modern Norwegian, vatn also means "smaller lake".

== Geography ==
Loch Watten has a surface of 373 ha, a mean depth of 2.6 m and a maximum depth of 3.7 m. The surface level is 17 m A.O.D.. Its catchment area comprises 55,78 km^{2}. Its main tributaries are the Quoynee Burn (from Loch Scarmclate) and the Gillock Burn, merging 800 metres before their entry. The outlet towards Wick River has a length of about 500 metres and is called Loch Burn.

== Conservation ==
Loch Watten is designated a Site of Special Scientific Interest (SSSI) by NatureScot due to its open water habitat and the fen vegetation surrounding it, as well as the greylag geese that use it. It is also designated a Special Area of Conservation (SAC) by NatureScot due to the habitats present. It is part of the Caithness Lochs Special Protection Area (SPA) due to the bird species present.

== Usage ==
Loch Watten is well known as a good fly fishing loch for brown trout with the local village Watten being located to the south.
