= Georgemas =

Coordinates: 58.52°N 3.45°W

- Location within the Caithness area
- Council area: Highland
- Lieutenancy area: Caithness
- Country: Scotland
- Sovereign state: United Kingdom
- Post town: HALKIRK
- Postcode district: KW12
- Dialling code: 01847
- Police: Scotland
- Fire: Scottish
- Ambulance: Scottish
- UK Parliament: Caithness, Sutherland and Easter Ross
- Scottish Parliament: Caithness, Sutherland and Ross constituency in the Highlands and Islands electoral region

Georgemas is an area in the county of Caithness, in the Highland area of Scotland, about 8 kilometres (5.0 mi) south of the town of Thurso and about two kilometres (one mile) east of the village of Halkirk.

The area is served also by the A9, A882 and B874 roads. The A9 has a junction with the A882 in the area and forms a crossroads with the B874.

The name Georgemas is that of a now historic St George's Day agricultural fair which was held in the area, on Sordale Hill. Georgemas Junction, the station name, dates from 1874.

== Rail transport ==
Georgemas has no real town or village centre of its own but it does have an unstaffed railway station called Georgemas Junction. The station is on the picturesque Far North Line and is the junction for the Wick and Thurso lines. It is located east of Scotscalder, west of Wick and south of Thurso. The station is managed by ScotRail.
