= Watten, Highland =

Coordinates: 58.47526°N 3.3008°W

Watten: Scottish Gaelic: Bhatan; Scots: Watten
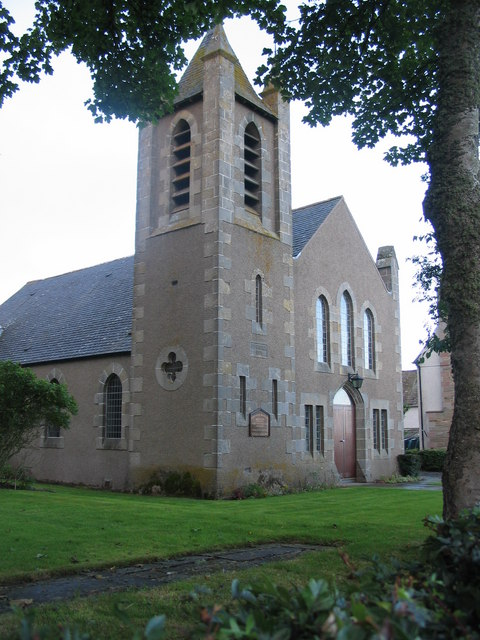
- Watten Parish Church

- Location within the Caithness area
- OS grid reference: ND242544
- Council area: Highland
- Country: Scotland
- Sovereign state: United Kingdom
- Post town: Wick
- Postcode district: KW1
- Police: Scotland
- Fire: Scottish
- Ambulance: Scottish

Watten (Scottish Gaelic: Bhatan) is a small village in Caithness, in the Highland area of Scotland, on the main road (A882-A9) between the burgh of Wick and the town of Thurso, about twelve kilometres (eight miles) west of Wick, and close to the Wick River and Loch Watten. The village is on the Far North railway line but the railway station was closed in 1960, and the station building is now a private house.

The village is within the parish of Watten, which has the parish of Bower to the north, that of Wick to the east, that of Latheron to the south and that of Halkirk to the west.

Loch Watten is the largest body of water in Caithness. The name of the village and loch appear to come from the Old Norse Vatn, meaning water or lake, and the loch is famous for its brown trout fishing. The local public house is also named "The Brown Trout" after the local produce.

== Prisoner of war camp ==
A military camp was built in Watten during World War II, in early 1943, and at the end of the war this became POW Camp 165. This had been described as "Britain's most secretive prisoner of war camp" because many prominent Nazis were moved there from POW Camp 21 at Comrie in Perthshire. These prisoners included Gunter d'Alquen, Himmler's chief propagandist, leading U-boat captain Otto Kretschmer, dubbed the "Wolf of the Atlantic", and SS-Sturmbannführer Max Wünsche. The camp closed in 1948.

== Notable people ==
Watten was the birthplace of Alexander Bain, inventor of a type of pendulum-regulated electric clock and the fax machine. Bain is commemorated by a carved stone monument outside the village hall. The fax machine is referred to on this monument as "The Electric Printing Telegraph".

Most recently David Manson age 35 took part in the Wick Triathlon Clubs Easter 10k. He narrowly beat a group of toddlers and got the victory. He now goes by “Storm Dave” and has been labelled the fastest man in Watten. https://www.johnogroat-journal.co.uk/sport/dave-storms-to-victory-in-wick-triathlon-club-s-easter-10k-431929/
