= Lochbroom, Highland =

Civil parish in Wester Ross, Scotland

Coordinates: 57°48′55″N 05°04′15″W

Lochbroom: Scottish Gaelic: Lochbraon
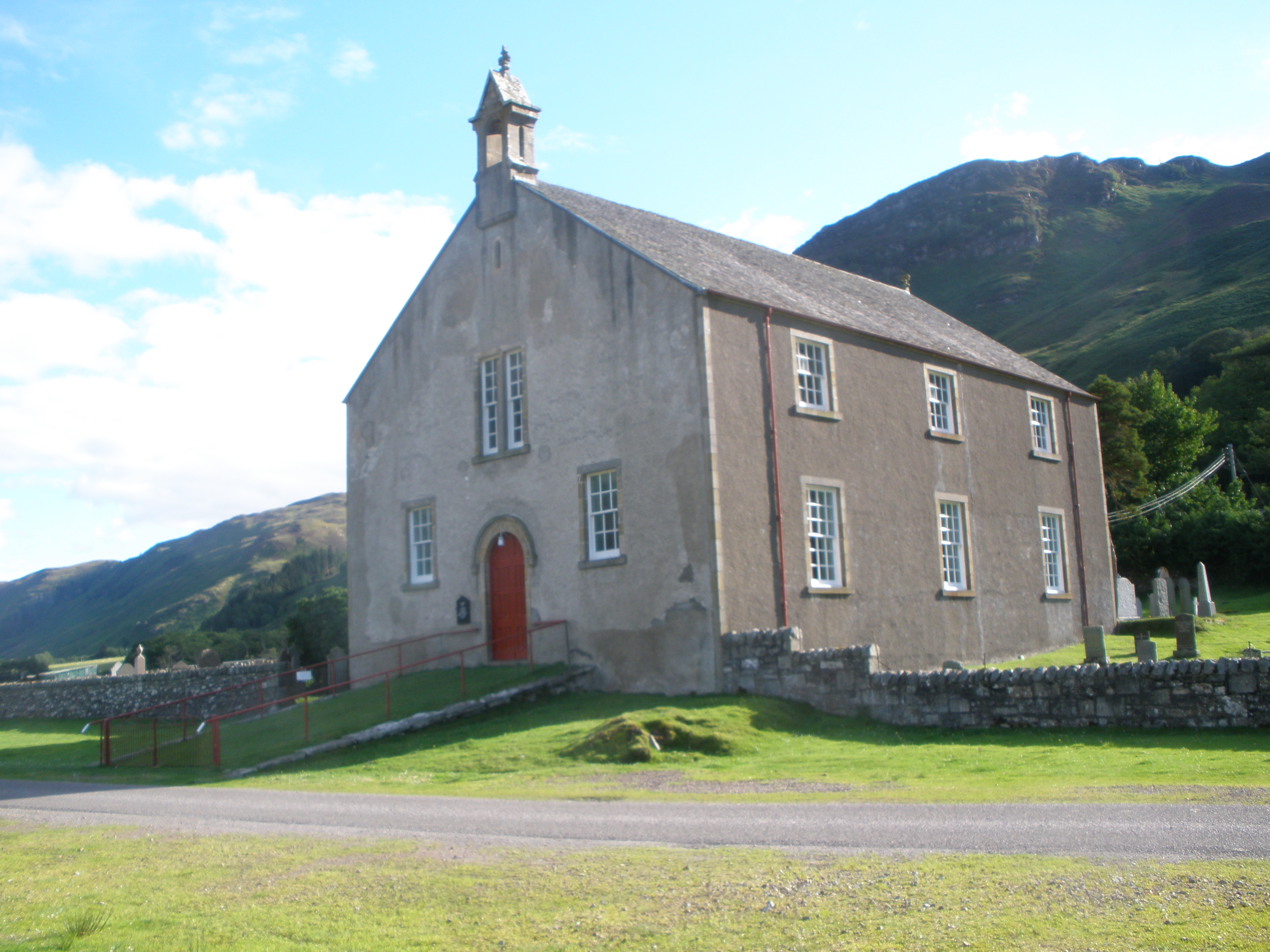
- Lochbroom old parish church

- Location within the Ross and Cromarty area
- Population: 2,487 (2011)
- OS grid reference: NH177847
- Civil parish: Lochbroom
- Council area: Highland
- Lieutenancy area: Ross and Cromarty
- Country: Scotland
- Sovereign state: United Kingdom
- Post town: ULLAPOOL
- Postcode district: IV26
- Police: Scotland
- Fire: Scottish
- Ambulance: Scottish
- UK Parliament: Ross, Skye and Lochaber
- Scottish Parliament: Caithness, Sutherland and Ross

Lochbroom is a civil parish in Ross and Cromarty, Scotland, part of the Highland Unitary Authority area. Its name is Gaelic (Lochbraon), meaning "loch of rain showers". It completely surrounds Loch Broom, a sea loch extending from 7 miles (11 km) inland from the Minch on the west coast of Scotland. The former parish church stands at the head of this loch, hence the name of the parish. Lochbroom is also a Community council area, but the north-west corner of the parish is the (much smaller) Coigach community council area.

At the 2011 census, the population of the civil parish was 2,487. Only 13.8% had some knowledge of Gaelic, whereas in 1891 86% were Gaelic speaking.

The area of the parish is 408 square miles (1,060 km^{2}).

The parish has an irregular coastline with several prominent inlets, including Loch Broom, Little Loch Broom, Enard Bay and Gruinard Bay and includes the islands of Tanera Mòr, Isle Martin and Gruinard Island.

In 1857, separate Registration Districts (R.D.) were established for Lochbroom and Coigach, the latter being about a quarter of the population of the parish (1891). When the Community council scheme began in 1976, Lochbroom and Coigach were likewise separate council areas. (The two R.D.s were united in 2002). .

Within the present boundaries, Coigach has 10% of the population and 15% of the area of the civil parish. Lochbroom has 10 community councillors and Coigach 8.

For church purposes only, Ullapool was made a separate parish from Lochbroom in 1859. This Ullapool Quoad sacra parish covered 62% of the population of the civil parish (1891), and included all of Coigach R.D. and part of Lochbroom R.D. The parishes are now reunited.

Ullapool is the main town. Other significant settlements are Badluarach, Badcaul, Scoraig, Dundonnell, Letters, Inverbroom(Clarach), Ardcharnich, Leckmelm, Morefield and Ardmair. In Coigach are Achiltibuie, (the main settlement), Altandhu and Polbain.
