= Carnach =

Coordinates: 57.90714°N 5.34757°W

Carnach: Scottish Gaelic: Càrnach
- Location within the Ross and Cromarty area
- OS grid reference: NH017957
- Council area: Highland
- Country: Scotland
- Sovereign state: United Kingdom
- Postcode district: IV23 2
- Police: Scotland
- Fire: Scottish
- Ambulance: Scottish

Carnach (Scottish Gaelic: Càrnach) is a remote hamlet on the north west shore of Little Loch Broom in Ross-shire, Scottish Highlands and is in the Scottish council area of Highland. It is located in the historic county of Cromartyshire.

The hamlet is only accessible by boat from the Badluarach jetty, or a 5 mile walk from the village of Badrallach to the east. Ullapool is located across Loch Broom.
