= Shell (2012 film) =

- Shell Poster
- Directed by: Scott Graham
- Written by: Scott Graham
- Produced by: David Smith; Margaret Matheson
- Starring: Chloe Pirrie; Joseph Mawle; Michael Smiley; Iain De Caestecker
- Cinematography: Yoliswa Gärtig
- Edited by: Rachel Tunnard
- Production company: Brocken Spectre
- Release date: 23 September 2012
- Running time: 90 minutes
- Country: United Kingdom
- Language: English

Shell is a 2012 independent drama film directed by Scott Graham. It stars Chloe Pirrie as Shell, a 17-year-old girl who lives and works at a petrol station in the Scottish Highlands. The film is a broader adaptation of a previous work by Scott Graham entitled with the same name released in 2007.

== Plot ==
The 17 year-old Shell lives an isolated life at a remote petrol station in the highlands with her father, Pete, who is a mechanic. She is lonely, with her only interactions coming from the station's customers. She has two regular customers, young sawmill worker Adam and divorced salesman Hugh. She has to care for her epileptic father, although Pete repels Shell's incestuous advances towards him.

One night, Pete and Shell help a couple, Robert and Clare, who have accidentally hit a deer. The next morning, Pete strips the deer to be used as venison, while Robert and Clare realize their car is too run-down to be used again and opts to rent a car instead. Clare converses with Shell, who reveals that her mother left when she was four and she stopped school when she was younger, and has been living with her father ever since. Clare gives Shell the book she was reading before she and Robert bid her goodbye.

Pete returns home from taking the couple's car to the scrapyard and admits to Shell that he went to a pub. As he washes himself, Shell attempts to seduce her father, but he rebuffs her instead. That night, when the boiler gives out, Shell climbs into bed with her father.

Hugh arrives after a failed weekend visiting his sons and gifts Shell a new pair of jeans. However, Hugh's repressed lust for her takes over and he hugs her for too long, so Shell forces him off her. The guilt-ridden Hugh quickly leaves without properly saying goodbye. After Hugh leaves, Shell approaches her father again as he repairs the heater, but he chastises her for touching him intimately.

Adam arrives to invite Shell out. Shell invites him inside where he meets Pete. Adam has lost his job due to being suspected of a break-in at the sawmill he worked in. He describes some of his own family issues and says he is considering setting up a similar operation to Pete's, or working with Pete, but Pete rebuffs him. Adam and Shell drive off and have sex in Adam's car.

A young mother and child stop off to use the petrol station's toilets and the child leaves her doll behind. Shell runs off after the car to return the child's doll. Before returning home, Shell opts to lie in the roadside heather, against a backdrop of the loch and the craggy Beinn Ghobhlach.

Shell returns to the petrol station to find Pete having another fit. While convulsing, he bites Shell badly. Recovering from his fit, a dazed Pete mistakes Shell for his wife and professes his need for his daughter, and Shell reiterates that she will stay with him. Pete kisses Shell intensely before realizing what he has done and pulls away, horrified. They fall asleep, but Pete wakes up in the middle of the night and, guilt-ridden for kissing Shell, throws himself in the way of a passing lorry. Shell awakens due to the accident and is distraught by her father's suicide.

Adam comforts the grieving Shell and stays with her. In the morning, a lorry arrives for fuel. Abandoning Adam, Shell goes off with the driver, without plans of where to go. The closing credits roll over shots of the Destitution Road.

== Cast ==
- Chloe Pirrie as Shell
- Michael Smiley as Hugh
- Joseph Mawle as Pete
- Iain De Caestecker as Adam
- Paul Hickey as Robert
- Kate Dickie as Clare
- Morven Christie as Young Mother
- Tam Dean Burn as Trucker

== Filming ==
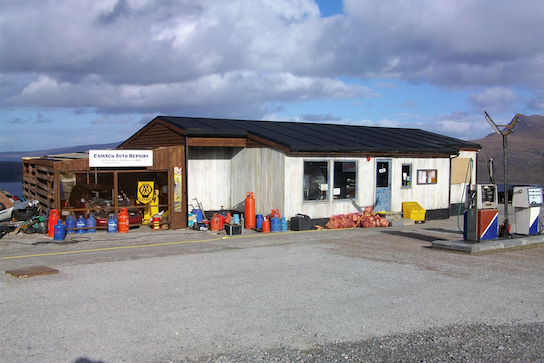
The garage constructed for the film

In 2011, filming began on location in the Scottish Highlands near the village of Badcaul, situated beside the sea loch Little Loch Broom. For the film, Production Designer Jamie Lapsley designed a purpose built garage which was constructed on a viewpoint overlooking the loch and the spectacular Beinn Ghobhlach on the peninsula opposite. The Destitution Road footage was shot near Fain.

== Critical reaction ==
Before its release Shell was nominated for three awards at the 2012 BFI London Film Festival, including the Best Newcomer award for lead Chloe Pirrie. Director Scott Graham is nominated for the BAFTA Award for Outstanding Debut by a British Writer, Director or Producer at the 67th British Academy Film Awards.
