= Gunn Eriksen =

Norwegian chef

- Born: 1956 (age 69–70); Grimstad, Norway
- Known for: two Micheline stars
- Culinary career
- Current restaurant: Altnaharrie Inn

Gunn Eriksen (born 1956) is a Norwegian chef. Operating at the Altnaharrie Inn in remote highland Scotland, she was Britain's only female two-star Michelin chef in the 1990s.

== Life ==
Eriksen was born in 1956 in Grimstad, Norway. She trained as a weaver and ceramicist in Ullapool in northern Scotland. In 1976, she helped her future husband, Fred Brown, open the Altnaharrie Inn nearby, only accessible from Ullapool by a boat trip across Loch Broom. In 1980 she joined him at the Inn, and married him in 1984.

Eriksen, a self-taught chef, became renowned for her use of unusual highland ingredients, such as nettles, sorrel and hawthorn sprouts. Influenced by her Scandinavian heritage, she also worked with local seafood and imported foods. In 1994, the restaurant became the only Scottish restaurant to gain two stars from Michelin, making her Britain's only female two-star Michelin chef. The restaurant was also one of only four in Britain to be rated 9.10 by the Good Food Guide, and received five rosettes in the AA's food guide.

The Altnaharrie Inn normally operated between Easter and November. However, Eriksen suffered a slipped disc and ongoing back problems, and as a result the restaurant was unable to open as usual in spring 2001. As a result, it was forced to relinquish its Michelin status later that year. In April 2002 the couple put the Altnaharrie up for sale.
