= Ardmair =

Coordinates: 57.93°N 05.19°W

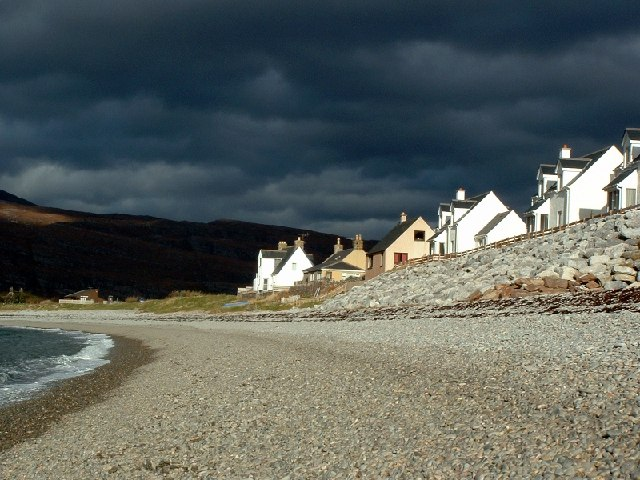
- Holiday homes at Ardmair

- Location within the Highland council area
- OS grid reference: NH1198
- Civil parish: Lochbroom
- Council area: Highland
- Country: Scotland
- Sovereign state: United Kingdom
- Police: Scotland
- Fire: Scottish
- Ambulance: Scottish
- UK Parliament: Ross, Skye and Lochaber
- Scottish Parliament: Caithness, Sutherland and Ross

Ardmair (Scottish Gaelic: Àird Mhèar) is a village in Wester Ross, in the North West Highlands of Scotland. Formerly a fishing village, Ardmair is located 3 miles (4.8 km) north of Ullapool along the A835 road. It is a popular holiday resort, with a caravan site and a number of holiday homes. During the holiday period, visitors can hire a boat from the beach at Ardmair, including canoe boats. The peak of Ben Mor Coigach is to the north, and is sometimes climbed by people staying in Ardmair.

Ardmair lies on the shores of Loch Kanaird. The River Kanaird flows into Loch Kanaird to the north of Ardmair Point; it rises in the hills to the north-east of Ullapool.

Offshore from Ardmair Bay lies Isle Martin, about a kilometre from Ardmair Point at its nearest point. This island is managed as a nature reserve, and was owned by the RSPB until 1999. On 3 May 1999 ownership of the island passed to a charitable trust formed by the local community, who agreed to assume responsibility for the island. The trust runs a passenger ferry running from Ardmair to Isle Martin on some days in the summer.

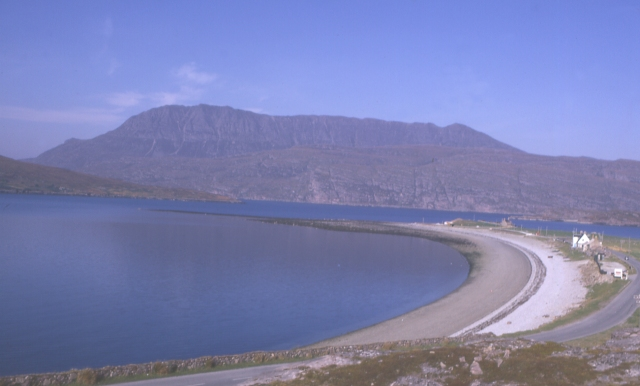
Ardmair Bay and Loch Kanaird. The peak of Ben Mor Coigach can be seen in the background
