= Badluarach =

Coordinates: 57.89°N 05.39°W

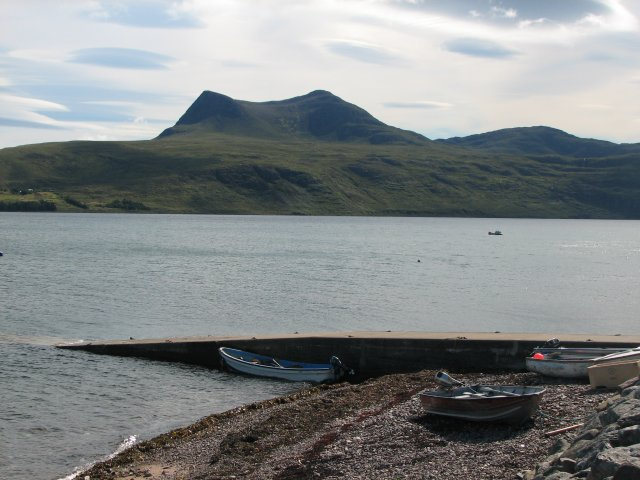
- Badluarach jetty, and the view across Little Loch Broom.

- Location within the Highland council area
- OS grid reference: NG9994
- Council area: Highland
- Country: Scotland
- Sovereign state: United Kingdom
- Police: Scotland
- Fire: Scottish
- Ambulance: Scottish

Badluarach (Scottish Gaelic: Am Bad Luachrach) is a small village on the south shore of Little Loch Broom, in Wester Ross in the Highland council area of Scotland. Badluarach is at the end of a minor road, which joins to the A832 road. The small village of Badcaul is about 3 km (2 mi) to the south-east, while Dundonnell is 12 km (7.5 mi) south-east.

A small ferry crosses from Badluarach to the community of Scoraig, on the opposite side of Little Loch Broom. There are no roads into Scoraig, the only way in is by boat or several miles walk.
