= Radio Wester Ross =

Coordinates: 57.7310°N 5.6986°W

RWR - Radio Wester Ross

Gairloch; United Kingdom
- Broadcast area: Wester Ross
- Frequencies: FM: 96.8 MHz (Achmelvich, Lochinver, Achiltibuie); 101.8 MHz (Torridon); 102.2 MHz (Ullapool); 106.0 MHz (Gairloch); 106.6 MHz (Loch Ewe and Loch Maree)
- RDS: RWR
- Branding: The Music of Your Life

Programming
- Format: Local news, information, music & programmes

Ownership
- Owner: Community owned through Wester Ross Radio Ltd

History
- First air date: 22 November 2003

Links
- Website: radiowesterross.scot

Radio Wester Ross is the community focused radio station for the Gairloch, Loch Ewe and Lochbroom areas of Wester Ross in the Highlands of Scotland. The station broadcasts on 106.0 and 106.6 FM in the Gairloch area and on 96.8 and 102.2 FM in the Ullapool and Coigach areas, and is the only commercial FM radio station in its area.

Radio Wester Ross is staffed by volunteers from across the area, broadcasting locally-originated and syndicated shows from its own presenters and partner stations throughout the week. It offers a mix of local news and information as well as music varying widely from the 1960s onwards.

The station is owned by the community and is a registered charity operating on a not-for-profit basis.

== History ==
The station began as Two Lochs Radio which was at one time Britain's smallest commercial radio station.

In April 2008, Two Lochs Radio launched an online "Listen Live" streaming service, accessible from a button on its homepage. In January 2012, Two Lochs Radio joined the large number of UK commercial and BBC stations available via Radioplayer. It is also available via TuneIn.

In 2012, Ullapool community station Lochbroom FM started to use Two Lochs Radio as its sustaining service. In 2020, broadcasting regulator Ofcom formally transferred the Lochbroom FM licence to Wester Ross Radio Ltd, the company that also holds the Two Lochs Radio licence.

In April 2024, a rebranding took place with Radio Wester Ross being used instead of the Two Lochs Radio & Lochbroom FM names.

== Programming ==
Radio Wester Ross's programme schedule includes daily breakfast and afternoon shows, plus a range of individual music and local interest programmes, including Gaelic broadcasts and recordings from local events, and shows from several other independent radio presenters. The station produces its own local news bulletins, and broadcasts UK national news provided by Radio News Hub.

== Awards ==
Two Lochs Radio was given the "Calor Scottish Business in the Community Business" award in 2004 and is a three-times winner of the Wallace Sword award for the best Gaelic magazine programme produced by a Highland community radio station. It was also nominated for the Scottish Countryside Alliance rural enterprise award in 2009.
