= Loopallu Festival =

Extinct annual music festival in Scotland

Loopallu
- Genre: Multiple
- Dates: late September
- Locations: Ullapool, Scotland
- Years active: 2005 – 2019
- Attendance: 2,500
- Capacity: 2,500
- Website: www.loopallu.co.uk

Loopallu was a 2-day music festival that took place in Ullapool, in the north of Scotland. It was held annually between 2005 and 2019, attracting 2,500 people which essentially doubled the population of the village while the event was being held.

The festival took place in Ullapool with the main stage located only metres from the shore of Loch Broom, in a big-top tent. After the acts on the main stage finish a string of fringe events continue into the early hours, offering live music.

== History ==
The first Loopallu was held in 2005, with the American rockgrass band Hayseed Dixie promoting the festival and being the headline act. The success of the event was also attributed to support being shown by BBC Radio 2’s Janice Long. The festival has been organised by local promoter Robert Hicks. The name of the festival is the name of the village, spelled backwards. It has played host to Mumford & Sons, Franz Ferdinand, Paolo Nutini. Echo & the Bunnymen and the Levellers.

In 2014 the festival added a literary tent, teaming up with the Ullapool Book Festival. That year the ticket quota sold out in advance of the acts being announced, and there were about 2,500 people attending the event on each of the days it was held.

In 2017 the festival moved from the loch-side site to take place on the pier in the harbour. This was to be the last event, but its success and pressure from the public ensured its continuance. Unfortunately 2019 was announced as the last year Loopallu would be held, citing pressure on accommodation as the primary reason.

The last festival was held on 27 – 28 September 2019.

== Lineups ==
=== 2013 lineup ===
The Enemy, Newton Faulkner, The Temperance Movement, Roddy Hart & The Lonesome Fire.

=== 2014 lineup ===
Utah Saints, Twin Atlantic, The Undertones, Shed Seven, Alabama 3, Public Service Broadcasting, Hunter and the Bear, Caithness-based rock band Neon Waltz and Wishaw-based indie band Vigo Thieves, Mark Radcliffe and his band The Foes.

=== 2019 lineup ===
The line-up for the last ever festival included Astrid, The Rezillos, Tide Lines, Bombskare, ONR, Idlewild, Peat and Diesel, Hunter and the Bear, The Vatersay Boys, and, on the Literally Literary stage, actor David Hayman and playwright Chris Dolan.
