= The Game (2014 TV series) =

British Cold War spy thriller television serial

- Promotional poster
- Genre: Thriller; Drama
- Created by: Toby Whithouse
- Written by: Toby Whithouse; Sarah Dollard; Debbie O'Malley
- Directed by: Niall MacCormick; Daniel O'Hara
- Starring: Tom Hughes; Brian Cox; Paul Ritter; Shaun Dooley; Chloe Pirrie; Victoria Hamilton; Jonathan Aris; Judy Parfitt
- Composer: Daniel Pemberton
- Country of origin: United Kingdom
- Original language: English
- No. of series: 1
- No. of episodes: 6

Production
- Executive producers: Faith Penhale; Hilary Salmon; Toby Whithouse
- Producer: Radford Neville
- Running time: 60 minutes
- Production company: BBC Cymru Wales

Original release
- Network: BBC America (US); BBC Two and BBC Two HD (UK)
- Release: 5 November – 10 December 2014

The Game is a British Cold War spy thriller television serial set in London in 1972. The six-part series was created by Toby Whithouse, written by Whithouse, Sarah Dollard and Debbie O'Malley, and first broadcast on BBC America in 2014.

Whithouse confirmed via Twitter in July 2015 that there would not be a second series.

== Story ==
Joe Lambe (Tom Hughes) is a young MI5 operative in 1972 London. The previous year, Joe had fallen in love with Yulia (Zana Marjanović), one of his Soviet contacts. He had tried to defect to the Soviet Union to be with her but Joe was arrested and Yulia was shot by a KGB enforcer he had not encountered before. Joe's MI5 superior, codenamed "Daddy" (Brian Cox), covers for him and insists that the attempted defection was a sanctioned undercover operation gone wrong and that Joe was only acting on the orders given to him; the outcome of the defection had gone awry and was out of Joe's control.

MI5 is contacted by Soviet university professor Arkady Malinov (Marcel Iureș), who reveals he is a KGB sleeper agent working undercover in the United Kingdom. He tells them that he has been activated to take part in "Operation Glass", a secret plan of game-changing importance, but he wants to defect. Joe is convinced by everything Arkady tells them except for the reason he wants to defect, that he wants to be a capitalist. He will be used as a go-between to pass messages to other sleeper agents in Britain. Daddy assembles a team to look into Operation Glass, including Joe; the ambitious civil servant Bobby Waterhouse (Paul Ritter); field agent and analyst Sarah Montag (Victoria Hamilton); her husband, Alan (Jonathan Aris), who is a bugging expert; and Daddy's secretary, Wendy (Chloe Pirrie). Joining them is Special Branch detective Jim Fenchurch (Shaun Dooley). As the team investigates Operation Glass, they remain in the dark as to what it is or even whether Arkady is a trustworthy informant or a double agent.

Their early leads seem to confirm the worst, as they discover that a Soviet sleeper agent has been attempting to learn the contents of the letters of last resort, which instruct British nuclear submarines on whether to launch their nuclear missiles should Britain be the victim of a nuclear attack. Later, they investigate Kate Wilkinson (Rachael Stirling), an MI6 officer who has been having an affair with a U.S. Air Force officer stationed at RAF Lakenheath, where the Americans are secretly storing nuclear weapons. Plans for a nuclear device are found in Wilkinson's possession and the team believes that the Soviets intend to detonate an American nuclear weapon in Britain, passing it off as an accident. However, Joe discovers evidence that the MI6 agent was framed, Alan realizes the technical plans have been largely faked and the team comes to the conclusion that Operation Glass was an overly elaborate feint by the Soviets.

During this time, Joe discovers that the Soviet enforcer who murdered Yulia goes by the codename "Odin"—the Russian word for one — who operates in the West, and specializes in eliminating treacherous agents attempting to defect or betray the Soviet Union. Joe had actually encountered Odin at one of their early investigations in London but was unable to capture him. Arkady is persuaded to use a friend within the Soviet embassy — who soon pays with his life — and is thus able to inform the group that there is a mole in MI5, codenamed "Phoenix". Arkady's real motivation for defecting is revealed to be a secret French wife and young daughter, but before MI5 can reunite them, he too is murdered by Odin, who can only have been given Arkady's location by Phoenix. Inexplicably sparing Joe, Odin escapes again.

As Joe and Jim Fenchurch begin investigating the possibilities of who might be the mole in MI5, they get a tip from the police about a former Army officer called Philip Denmore, who has been enlisting the IRA for help in building a bomb. They send Wendy into his house posing as a nurse to gather information, but he eludes them along with his homemade device. Joe and Jim stake out a location that Phoenix had used as a dead drop and are shocked when they discover Alan coming out of the booth. Under interrogation, Alan admits to being the mole but nonetheless helps MI5 analyse a phone call to determine Denmore's location. Joe recognises it as the street outside of the Conservative Party headquarters and rushes to the scene, but arrives too late to prevent the detonation by a suicidal Denmore. Later, Sarah is surprised outside her home by Odin — but invites him inside to discuss her role as the real mole inside MI5 and the compromises that have already taken place.

Still believing Alan to be the mole, the team digs into his past to discover possible motives and what secrets he may have compromised to the Soviets. Wendy also discovers that a high-ranking Metropolitan Police official, whose name connects to a child who died in infancy, seems to have no official record before joining the force. Suspecting a plant, Bobby orders Wendy to look for other officials in the government who have mysterious and unexplainable gaps in their record, as well as former known radicals who inexplicably disappeared at coinciding times. Jim tracks down Colin Blakefield, a smuggler who had put Denmore in contact with the IRA and who also has Soviet contacts. Blakefield reveals that the Soviets had instructed him to prepare a fake passport for one of their agents: Joe Lambe. Daddy is furious at this fresh betrayal and the authorities attempt to arrest Joe, but he escapes and goes on the run, aided by Sarah, who encourages him to seek out Odin.

Before he went on the run, Wendy had told Joe she had discovered an audio tape where a drunk Soviet agent brags openly about knowing Phoenix. Every reference to the person's real name has been removed, presumably by Alan. When Joe listens to the tape, he discovers that not only the name but also the pronouns referring to this person have been removed; he deduces that what's missing are all instances of "her" and "she", meaning that Sarah is the mole and Alan has only confessed to cover for her as he still loves her. When Joe confronts Sarah, she tells him that Yulia is still alive in KGB custody and that if he wants to see her, he should report to a given address — Daddy will never believe she is the real Phoenix anyway. She then goes to see her imprisoned husband, to give him a cover story which he can use until her compatriots rescue him (in fact, Odin has already tried to have him killed). Alan, however, uses a threat of suicide to prove she cares about him.

Wendy and Bobby reveal to Daddy that they have discovered a dozen highly placed figures in government who lack any early history and have names taken from dead infants, indicating they are potential Soviet moles. Daddy realises that all of the people on the list have significant ties to the Deputy Prime Minister, who is in fact the operator of the real Operation Glass: it is still ongoing, with the silent coup d'etat to be the shooting by a sniper of the Prime Minister as he tours the site of the bombing at Conservative Party headquarters. It is planned that, in the aftermath of this assassination, various heads would roll (including Daddy's) and all of the Communist moles would move up in the bureaucracy. The Deputy Prime Minister would be free to run the country as Prime Minister, effectively placing Britain under Communist rule with the Deputy Prime Minister taking orders from the Soviet Union.

When Joe goes to the address Sarah had given him, he finds Odin and a sniper about to kill the Prime Minister. Joe will be given a passport and allowed to escape with Yulia, thus MI5's downfall will be complete. Odin has a gun to her head and Joe's prints are put on the sniper rifle — but it is not the PM who arrives outside at the bombing site, but Jim. Joe is wearing a wire, having gone to Daddy with his information on Sarah. An MI5 sniper shoots Odin, and Joe tackles the KGB sniper and rescues Yulia. Odin attempts to escape once more but Joe finally corners him. Odin dies, having taken a cyanide pill, telling Joe that Yulia has been working for them and continues to do so.

== Cast ==
- Tom Hughes as Joe Lambe, an MI5 operative
- Brian Cox as 'Daddy', the Director General of MI5
- Paul Ritter as Bobby Waterhouse, the Head of MI5 K Branch (counter-espionage)
- Shaun Dooley as DC Jim Fenchurch, a Special Branch detective
- Chloe Pirrie as Wendy Straw, an MI5 secretary for Daddy
- Victoria Hamilton as Sarah Montag, MI5 operative, Bobby's deputy and Alan's wife
- Jonathan Aris as Alan Montag, surveillance expert and Sarah's husband
- Marcel Iureș as Arkady Malinov, a Russian university professor and KGB sleeper agent
- Rachael Stirling as Kate Wilkinson, an MI6 operative
- Zana Marjanović as Yulia, one of Joe's Soviet contacts and his sweetheart
- Yevgeni Sitokhin as Odin, a KGB assassin who is the cause of Joe's part in solving Operation Glass as he killed Yulia in one of the previous missions
- Goran Navojec as Bogdan Rodchenko
- Steven Mackintosh as Tom Mallory, a violent and sadistic sleeper agent
- Emma Fielding as Valerie Parkwood

== Production ==
On 30 November 2012, BBC Cymru Wales, the division of the BBC for Wales, announced the commissioning of the series. The drama was commissioned by Danny Cohen, the controller of BBC One, and Ben Stephenson, the controller of drama commissioning for the BBC.

Filming began in Birmingham, London and Wales in August 2013. Birmingham Central Library, since demolished but a notable example of Brutalist architecture, was used as both an interior and exterior location for the headquarters of MI5. Other locations include Birmingham Moor Street railway station, Warstone Lane Cemetery, Cannon Hill Park, the Old Rep, Grand Hotel, Moseley Road Baths, Methodist Central Hall, Merevale Hall, Lickey Hills, the canals in Smethwick, Newhall Street, and the Birmingham old Central Fire Station. Interior railway scenes were shot on the Ecclesbourne Valley Railway in Derbyshire.

The series consists of six episodes, each lasting sixty minutes. The executive producers for the series were Faith Penhale, head of drama at BBC Cymru Wales; Hilary Salmon, the senior executive producer for the BBC; and creator Toby Whithouse. Brian Minchin was originally an executive producer for the series. The producer was Radford Neville for BBC Cymru Wales. Whithouse said in 2017 that The Game "had not been a particularly enjoyable experience".

Tom Hughes said of the role, "Joe is the type of character that you come across very rarely – on the surface one person, but inside someone entirely different." Brian Cox, who plays Daddy, said that "the rich character-driven storylines were a real draw and really capture the intense feeling of the cold war period." The series was showcased by BBC Worldwide in Liverpool in 2014.

== Broadcast ==
The series premiered on BBC America on 5 November 2014.

Broadcasts in Australia began on BBC First on 23 March 2015 and the UK showing started on BBC Two on 30 April 2015. The series became available on ABC iview in Australia in 2025.

== Home media ==
The series was released on DVD in the US. Following its broadcast on BBC Two, the series was released in the UK on DVD and Blu-ray on 8 June 2015.
