= The Waldo Moment =

- Black Mirror episode
- The candidates standing for election. From left to right: Labour Candidate Gwendolyn Harris (Chloe Pirrie); Liberal Democrat candidate Conor Simpson (James Lance); Conservative candidate Liam Monroe (Tobias Menzies); animated blue bear Waldo; Waldo operator Jamie (Daniel Rigby); producer Tamsin (Christina Chong).
- Episode no.: Series 2 Episode 3
- Directed by: Bryn Higgins
- Written by: Charlie Brooker
- Cinematography by: Mike Spragg
- Editing by: Ben Yeates
- Original air date: 25 February 2013
- Running time: 44 minutes

Guest appearances
- Daniel Rigby as Jamie Salter; Chloe Pirrie as Gwendolyn Harris; Jason Flemyng as Jack Napier; Tobias Menzies as Liam Monroe; Christina Chong as Tamsin; James Lance as Conor Simpson; Ed Gaughan as Shaun; Pip Torrens as Philip Crane; David Ajala as Jeff Carter; Michael Shaeffer as Roy

Episode chronology
← Previous "White Bear"	Next → "White Christmas"

"The Waldo Moment" is the third episode in the second series of the British science fiction anthology television series Black Mirror. It was written by series creator and showrunner Charlie Brooker and directed by Bryn Higgins, and first aired on Channel 4 on 25 February 2013. The episode originated in an idea for Nathan Barley, an earlier TV show by Brooker and Chris Morris.

The episode tells the story of Jamie Salter (Daniel Rigby), an unhappy and disillusioned comedian who plays a blue animated bear called Waldo in a satirical television programme. After a politician he interviewed—Liam Monroe (Tobias Menzies)—enters a by-election to become member of parliament, Waldo stands as a candidate. Meanwhile, Jamie and another candidate, Gwendolyn Harris (Chloe Pirrie), develop feelings for each other. Waldo's popularity continues to rise, but Jamie, whose life is torn between his career and his role, becomes increasingly discontented with the role he is playing.

The episode is in contrast to other Black Mirror episodes with its contemporary setting; it explores public distrust of politicians. Initially based in part on the politician and future British prime minister Boris Johnson, the character of Waldo was widely compared to business magnate Donald Trump following his successful 2016 campaign to become President of the United States. The episode was considered by critics to be very poor in comparison to other Black Mirror episodes, with criticisms made of its reliance on tropes and its ending. The characters of Waldo and Jamie received mixed reception.

== Plot ==
On a topical comedy show, Jamie Salter (Daniel Rigby) plays Waldo—a vulgar, animated blue bear who interviews public figures under the pretense of a children's television programme. After Conservative politician Liam Monroe (Tobias Menzies) files a complaint over his interview, a television pilot starring Waldo is commissioned. Despite this, Jamie is disillusioned and unsatisfied with his life, particularly over a recent breakup. Executive Jack Napier (Jason Flemyng) notes that Monroe is standing to become a member of parliament in the by-election for the fictional constituency of Stentonford and Hersham. It is agreed that Waldo should also stand.

Appearing as Waldo via video screens on the side of a van, Jamie goads Monroe into confrontation as he campaigns. Meanwhile, Gwendolyn Harris (Chloe Pirrie) has been chosen as the Labour Party candidate, though the constituency is a safe seat for the Conservatives. Harris and Jamie get drunk together, Jamie expressing his displeasure at being stuck as Waldo and Harris admitting she will not win. They have sex and agree to continue their relationship. Harris' campaign manager, Roy (Michael Shaeffer), is alarmed that she talked to Jamie, telling her that she cannot see him during the campaign.

Waldo and the other candidates are invited to a student-organised hustings, in which Monroe details Jamie's mostly unsuccessful television career and derides his message as meaningless. Jamie attacks both Monroe and Harris as disingenuous career politicians, using information Harris divulged during their encounter. Waldo's rant goes viral on YouTube and receives media coverage; Waldo is interviewed by political pundit Philip Crane (Pip Torrens). Jamie, whose life is torn between his career and his role, is reluctant to continue as Waldo but does so after Jack threatens to play him instead. Afterward, Jack and Jamie meet with American agent Jeff Carter (David Ajala), who talks about the advantages of a cartoon figurehead over a human in spreading political messages abroad.

Jamie attempts to apologise to Harris, but she is furious with him and runs off. The next day, Jamie breaks character and urges everyone not to vote for Waldo; Jack assumes his role as Waldo and frivolously rants to invite a member of the public to assault Jamie. In the hospital, Jamie sees the results of the election: Monroe won, Waldo was second, and Harris was third, though Jack, using Waldo, incites a riot. In the final scene, a homeless Jamie is ordered to move on by the police. He sees a screen displaying Waldo on every channel, in different languages. Out of frustration, Jamie throws a bottle at it, but the police tase and attack him.

== Production ==
External videos
- "Waldo Trailer"; A trailer for "The Waldo Moment"
- "The Waldo Moment"; A behind-the-scenes look at the episode

"The Waldo Moment" was the third episode of the second series of Black Mirror, produced by Zeppotron for Endemol. It aired on Channel 4 on 25 February 2013 at 10 p.m. On 22 January 2013, a trailer for the second series was released, featuring a dream sequence, a factory location and a large dust cloud. The advert ran on Channel 4 and in cinemas. A trailer for "The Waldo Moment" premiered on 19 February 2013.

=== Conception and writing ===
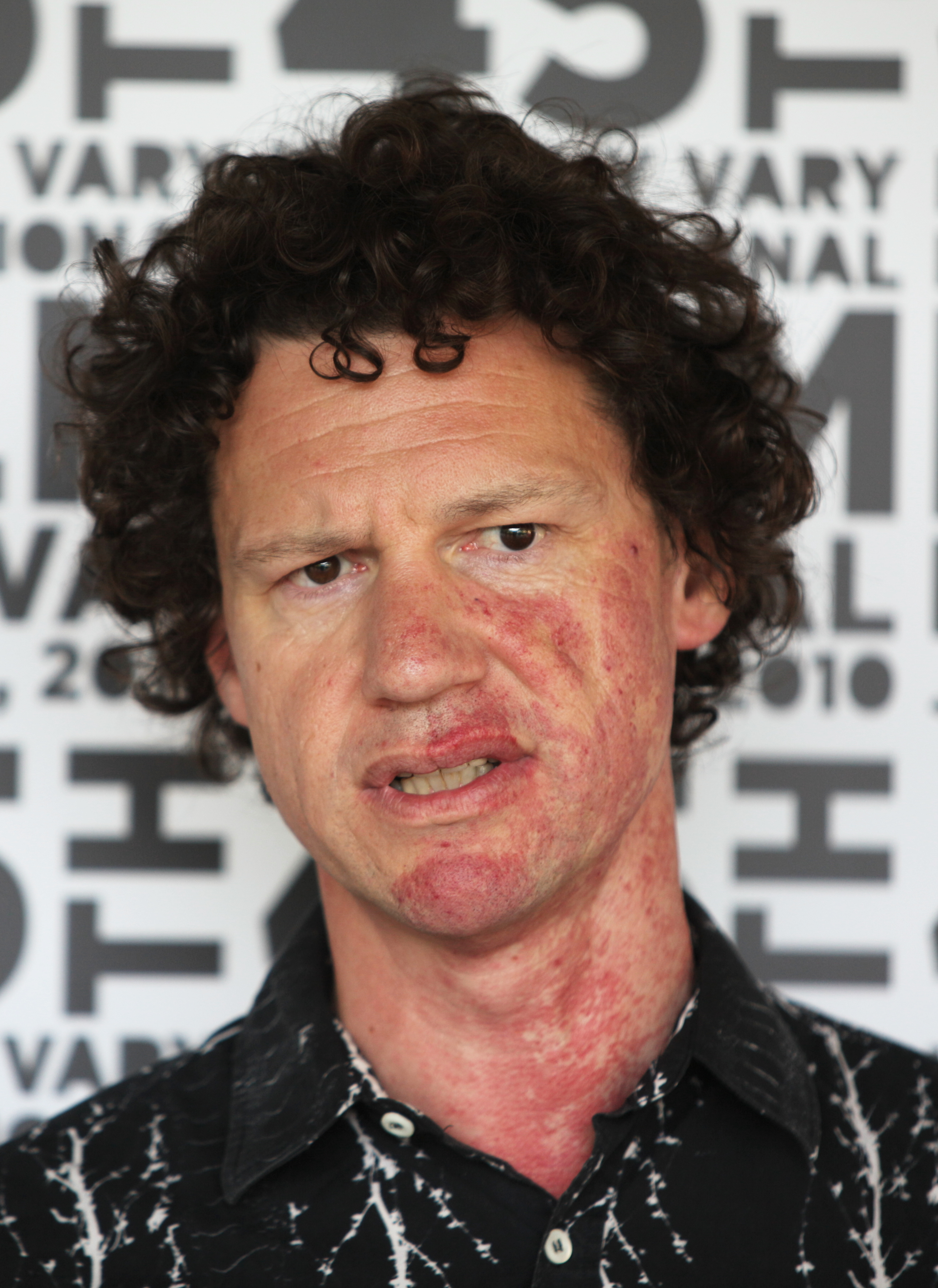
Chris Morris, with whom Brooker conceived the initial idea for "The Waldo Moment"

The episode was written by series creator Charlie Brooker. It originates from an idea by Brooker and Chris Morris, conceived when the pair were writing Nathan Barley in 2005. They imagined a politician based on the British virtual band Gorillaz, whose members are animated cartoon characters. When Brooker came to write the episode, he took inspiration for Waldo's character on British politician Boris Johnson, and Ali G was also an inspiration. Jón Gnarr, a stand-up comedian who became mayor of Reykjavík, was another reference point, and after the episode idea was conceived.

Brooker said that the episode is "asking what satire's about". Some of Jamie's dialogue is based on Brooker's own perspective from his career, such as co-presenting 10 O'Clock Live, a political comedy which ran from 2011 to 2013. Brooker commented that the episode was rushed due to time constraints, as he was busy rewriting drafts of another series two episode, "White Bear". He had wanted to do more research, though he did consult with his sister-in-law Rupa Huq, a then-Labour politician. Brooker said in 2018 that the idea should have been executed in a longer format, such as a two-part episode, miniseries or movie. He also wanted Jamie to be in more jeopardy, and to further develop the idea of Waldo as a "lightning rod for dissatisfaction with politicians". He expressed regret at rejecting the idea of having Gwendolyn and Jamie be ex-partners.

=== Pre-production ===
Brooker based Waldo on Ratz, a virtual floating cat head from the first series of 1990s children's show Live & Kicking. As Waldo was controlled live during filming, using state-of-the-art live animation techniques, several months of pre-production work was done at the design studio Painting Practice. Staff at Passion Pictures worked on animation, having recently developed the animated meerkat Aleksandr for the advertising campaign Compare the Meerkat.

=== Filming ===
Bryn Higgins directed the episode. Describing the comedy as "implicit", Higgins aimed to film the episode in the style of a "fairly slick modern thriller". The technology shown in the episode was not too far beyond what was possible at the time, as Brooker wanted the episode to veer away from science fiction. The rig used mapped the emotions and facial movements of the performer onto the Waldo character, and it is seen in the episode. As well as Rigby, four puppeteers controlled Waldo, assigned to the roles of his eyes, his mouth, his body and the rest. Brooker requested Waldo's animation to be purposefully clunky so that the viewer would believe that Jamie was controlling him live.

The Waldo van was taken to High Wycombe, a town in southeast England, where members of the public were involved in interacting with Waldo. Due to legal concerns, Waldo's penis was not shown in public. Following Liam Monroe's line "He's making the whole system look absurd. Which it may well be, but it built these roads", it was planned for the car to go over a pothole, but this was cut as it looked like a camera mistake.

== Analysis ==
"The Waldo Moment" is a political satire and dystopia; it features aspects of dark humour. It differs from most previous episodes in its lack of science fiction elements and absence of technology as a key theme. It bears similarities to the programme's first episode, "The National Anthem", which also has a storyline where "the political process is subverted by the general public's insatiable appetite for stupidity and scandal", according to Sam Parker of HuffPost.

"The Waldo Moment" explores distrust and apathy towards politicians. Ryan Lambie of Den of Geek summarised the episode's message in the phrase "self-absorption will be the death of politics", whilst Parker felt that the episode demonstrated "a desire for a more honest form of politics". Serena Davies of The Telegraph commented that the episode was "a mockery of the deeply compromised ideals of modern politics", whilst reminding viewers that politicians are "all we've got". Morgan Jeffery of Digital Spy analysed that the episode criticises satire and "those who persecute others without having anything meaningful to say", and Emily Yoshida of Grantland believed that it exposed the issues of "cheap humour" being leveraged by politicians.

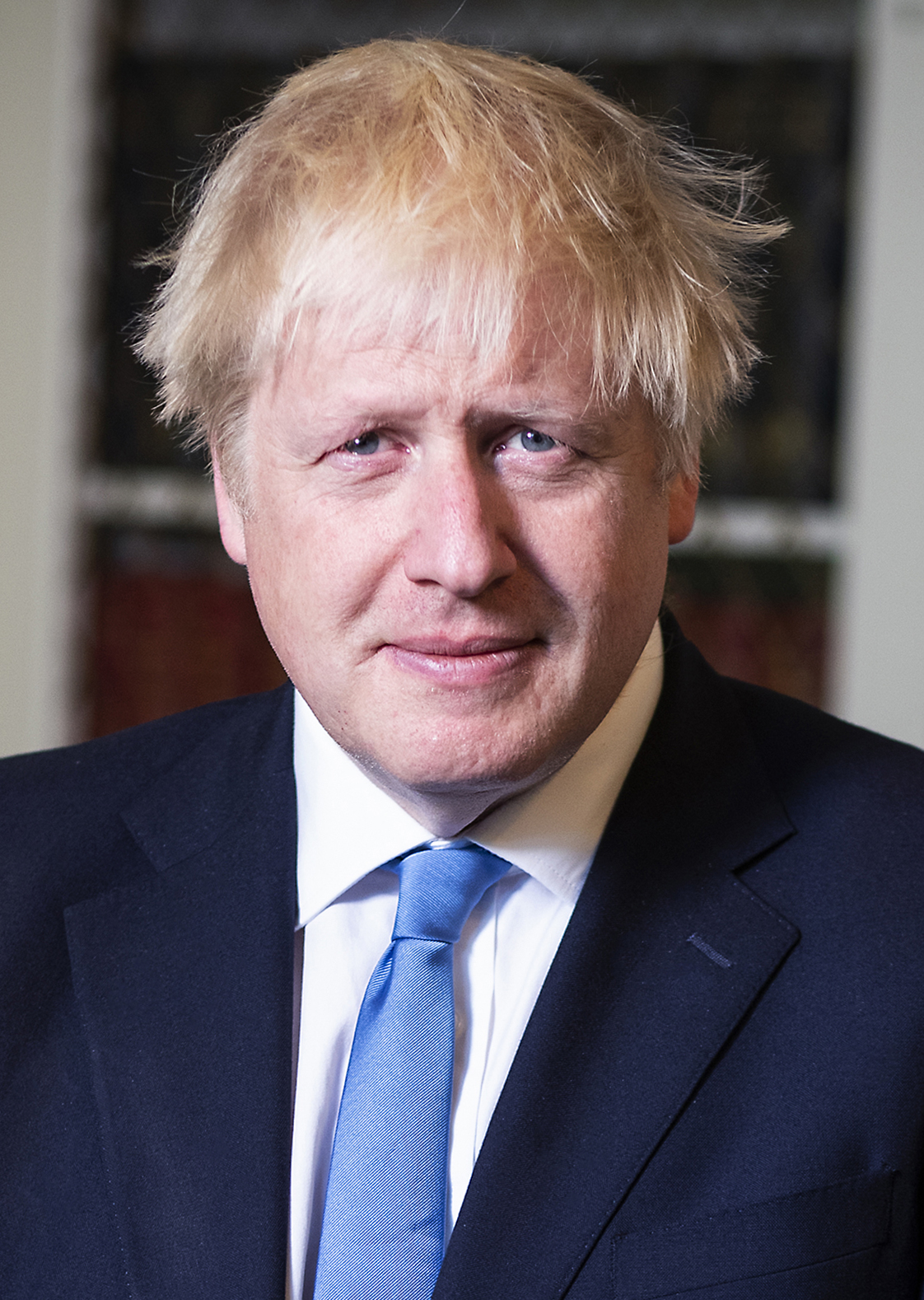
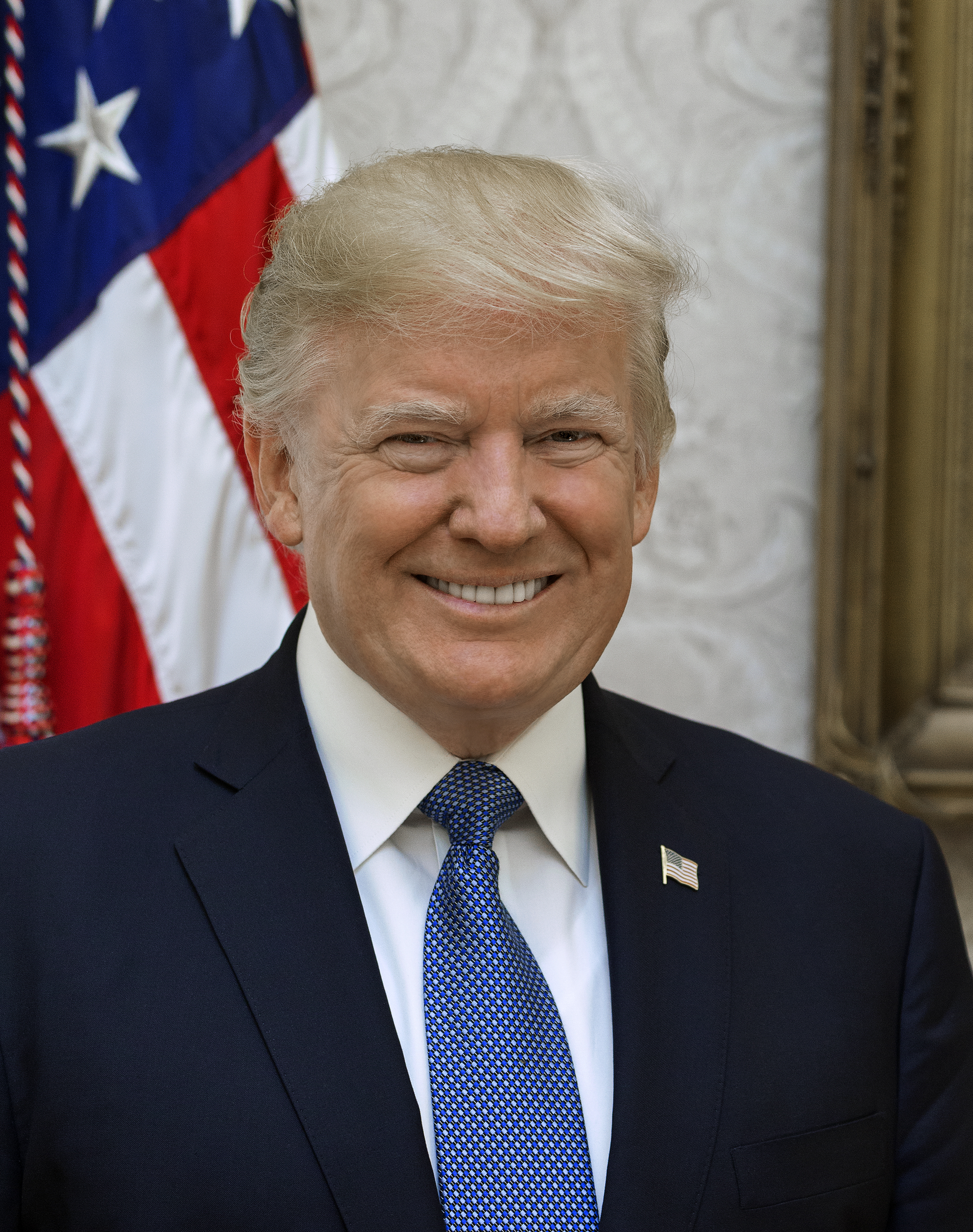
Politicians Boris Johnson and Donald Trump were widely compared to the character of Waldo, with Brooker describing the figures as "entertainers" who "upend normality".

Boris Johnson, a British politician who became prime minister in 2019, was an inspiration for Waldo's character. Brooker described Johnson as "quite a clown", opining that his image "inoculated him from criticism" and set him apart from other politicians, who were seen as "bland robots parroting the same platitudes". Three years after the episode aired, in 2016, the presidential campaign of Donald Trump began to take off. "The Waldo Moment" was seen as prescient with regards to Trump. Several news reports, including one by Chris Cillizza, political reporter for The Washington Post, compared Donald Trump's 2016 presidential campaign to the episode. Brooker also compared Trump to Waldo, describing the latter as "an anti-politics candidate who's raucous and defensive" and "offers nothing". Brooker said that Trump and Johnson were both "entertainers" who "upend normality", and successfully predicted in September 2016 that Trump would win the election. On the night that Trump was elected, the Twitter account for Black Mirror posted in response: "This isn't an episode. This isn't marketing. This is reality."

The episode has also been compared to the 2019 election of Volodymyr Zelenskyy, a satirical actor and comedian, as President of Ukraine. Zelenskyy's campaign was almost exclusively restricted to the internet, with Adrian Karatnycky of Politico commenting that his campaign resembled Waldo's in that he "made no public speeches, held no rallies and gave no press conferences". Like Waldo, Zelenskyy had few clear policy positions prior to election. The character of Waldo was also compared to "Professor Pongoo", a candidate in the 2012 Scottish local elections who dressed as a penguin and received more first-preference votes than the Liberal Democrats. The technology in the episode was later compared with "animoji"—avatars in the style of emoji which animate in coordination with the user's facial movements. Animoji were announced in 2017 as a new feature of the iPhone X, and resembled the technology used to animate the fictional Waldo.

== Reception ==
The episode aired on Channel 4 at 10 p.m. on 25 February 2013, and was watched by 1.28 million viewers, according to 7-day data from BARB. In contrast to previous episodes, it drew poor critical reviews at the time of broadcast. On the review aggregator website Rotten Tomatoes, it holds an approval rating of 50% based on 16 reviews, with an average rating of 6.00/10. The website's critics consensus reads: "'The Waldo Moment' aims for sharp political commentary, but comes off as uninspired as the obnoxious cartoon that runs for office." It was considered to be the weakest episode to date by Yoshida and the weakest of the series by Parker and Richard Edwards of GamesRadar+, though Luke Owen of Flickering Myth found it to be the "best and most ambitious" of the series. "The Waldo Moment" garnered ratings of four out of five stars in The Arts Desk, 3.5 out of five stars in GamesRadar+, three out of five stars in HuffPost and The Telegraph, and a C+ rating in The A.V. Club.

The characters of Jamie and Waldo received mixed reviews. David Sims of The A.V. Club criticised the "frustratingly vague" motivations of Jamie's character, who was "poorly sketched out". Sims further reviewed that Waldo failed to be funny or to make meaningful comments. Edwards also criticised Waldo's dialogue and called him "too two-dimensional". He did, however, laud Waldo's virtual appearance and interactivity as a "fantastic premise" which was "brilliantly executed". Lisa-Marie Ferla of The Arts Desk praised the "perfectly-pitched comedy" in Waldo's speech on the student-organised panel.

The writing was poorly received, with Parker describing it as "unfocused". Edwards found the storyline to be predictable and filled with tropes and Parker wrote that the characterisation in the episode was "riddled with stereotypes". Owen criticised that conclusions to the relationship of Gwendolyn and Jamie was "merely (an) afterthought". Sims criticised the American think-tank meeting as "the laziest kind of spoofery", and Edwards concurred, calling it "totally unconvincing". However, in praise of the writing, Yoshida, Ferla and Owen believed the episode's storyline to be plausible.

The ending was widely criticised. Lambie described it as "sudden" and "on-the-nose", Sims opined that it was "ludicrous", and Jeffery and Davies called it "half-baked" and "hammy", respectively. Lambie believed that the episode's message was clear halfway through; contrastingly, Edwards found the message to be unclear throughout. Owen found the episode to "cram in too much story", saying that its final quarter was paced too quickly.

=== Episode rankings ===
Various critics have authored rankings of Black Mirror episodes by quality. Of critics who rated the 23 instalments in the series, "The Waldo Moment" was ranked as follows:

- 18th – Travis Clark, Business Insider
- 19th – Charles Bramesco, Vulture
- 22nd – James Hibberd, Entertainment Weekly
- 22nd – Corey Atad, Esquire
- 23rd – Matt Donnelly and Tim Molloy, TheWrap
- 23rd – Morgan Jeffery, Digital Spy
- 23rd – Aubrey Page, Collider

Additionally, the episode was rated 21st of 22 (excluding Bandersnatch) by reviewers at IndieWire, and 16th of 19 by Eric Anthony Glover of Entertainment Tonight, who ranked episodes from the first four series. Proma Khosla of Mashable ranked the 22 Black Mirror instalments excluding Bandersnatch by tone, concluding that "The Waldo Moment" is the most pessimistic episode of the show "if only because it became reality". Other critics ranked the 13 episodes in Black Mirror's first three series, where "The Waldo Moment" placed as follows:

- 8th (of the Top Ten) – Brendan Doyle, Comingsoon.net
- 10th – Adam David, CNN Philippines
- 11th – Jacob Hall, /Film
- 13th – Mat Elfring, GameSpot
- 13th – Andrew Wallenstein, Variety

== See also ==
- "Decision 3012" (Futurama)
- "Funnybot" (South Park)
- "Mr. President" (Smiling Friends)
- State of the Union (film)
- The Portillo moment
- "The Wunderkind" (The Twilight Zone)
- Triumph the Insult Comic Dog
- VTuber
