= Lochbroom FM =

Coordinates: 57.8986°N 5.1603°W

- Ullapool; Scotland
- Broadcast area: Wester Ross
- Frequencies: 96.8 MHz, 102.2 MHz

Programming
- Format: Community info & mixed music

Ownership
- Owner: Community owned via Wester Ross Radio Ltd

History
- First air date: 1995
- Last air date: 2020

Links
- Website: www.lochbroomfm.com

Lochbroom FM was a radio station based in Ullapool, Wester Ross in the Highlands of Scotland that broadcast between 1995 and 2020 and which was Britain's smallest radio station.

The station now broadcasts as Radio Wester Ross after a rebrand to unite the broadcast areas of Two Lochs Radio and Lochbroom FM.

== History ==
A community radio association was formed in 1994. They broadcast in 1995 using a three-month temporary commercial radio licence from a small tin shack with a transmission radius of 20 miles. A further two-month licence let them broadcast in 1996, and then a full eight-year licence came into operation at the end of May 1997.

A purpose-built station was proposed, which was to be funded through a variety of grants. In 1996, it was announced that they had secured £45,000 of lottery funding towards the purchase and fitting out of a new building.

Lochbroom FM launched on 23 May 1997. It broadcast on 96.8 MHz and 102.2 MHz. The studio opened in September 1998.

In 2012, the station started to use neighbouring commercial station Two Lochs Radio as its sustaining service. In 2020, broadcasting regulator Ofcom formally transferred the Lochbroom FM licence to Wester Ross Radio Ltd, the company that also holds the Two Lochs Radio licence.

The station rebranded to Radio Wester Ross on Monday 29 April 2024.
