= Letters, Wester Ross =

Coordinates: 57.8401°N 5.0997°W

Letters: Scottish Gaelic: An Leitir
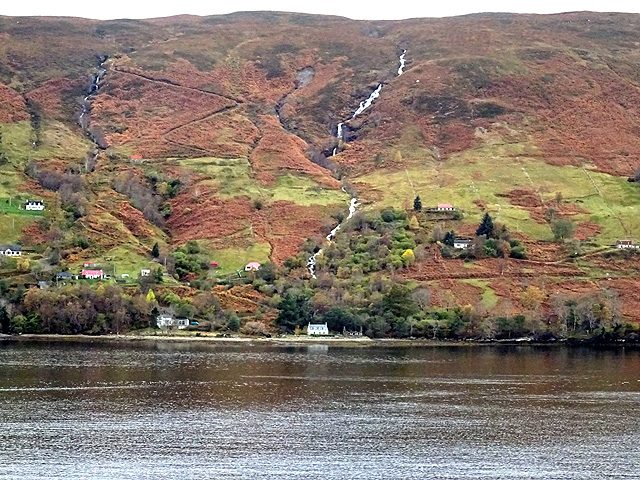
- Looking towards Letters across Loch Broom

- Location within the Ross and Cromarty area
- OS grid reference: NH165875
- Council area: Highland
- Country: Scotland
- Sovereign state: United Kingdom
- Postcode district: IV23 2
- Police: Scotland
- Fire: Scottish
- Ambulance: Scottish

Letters (Scottish Gaelic: An Leitir) is a village on the south west shore of Loch Broom, in Garve, Ross-shire, Scottish Highlands and is in the Scottish council area of Highland.
