= Beinn Ghobhlach =

Mountain in Highland, Scotland

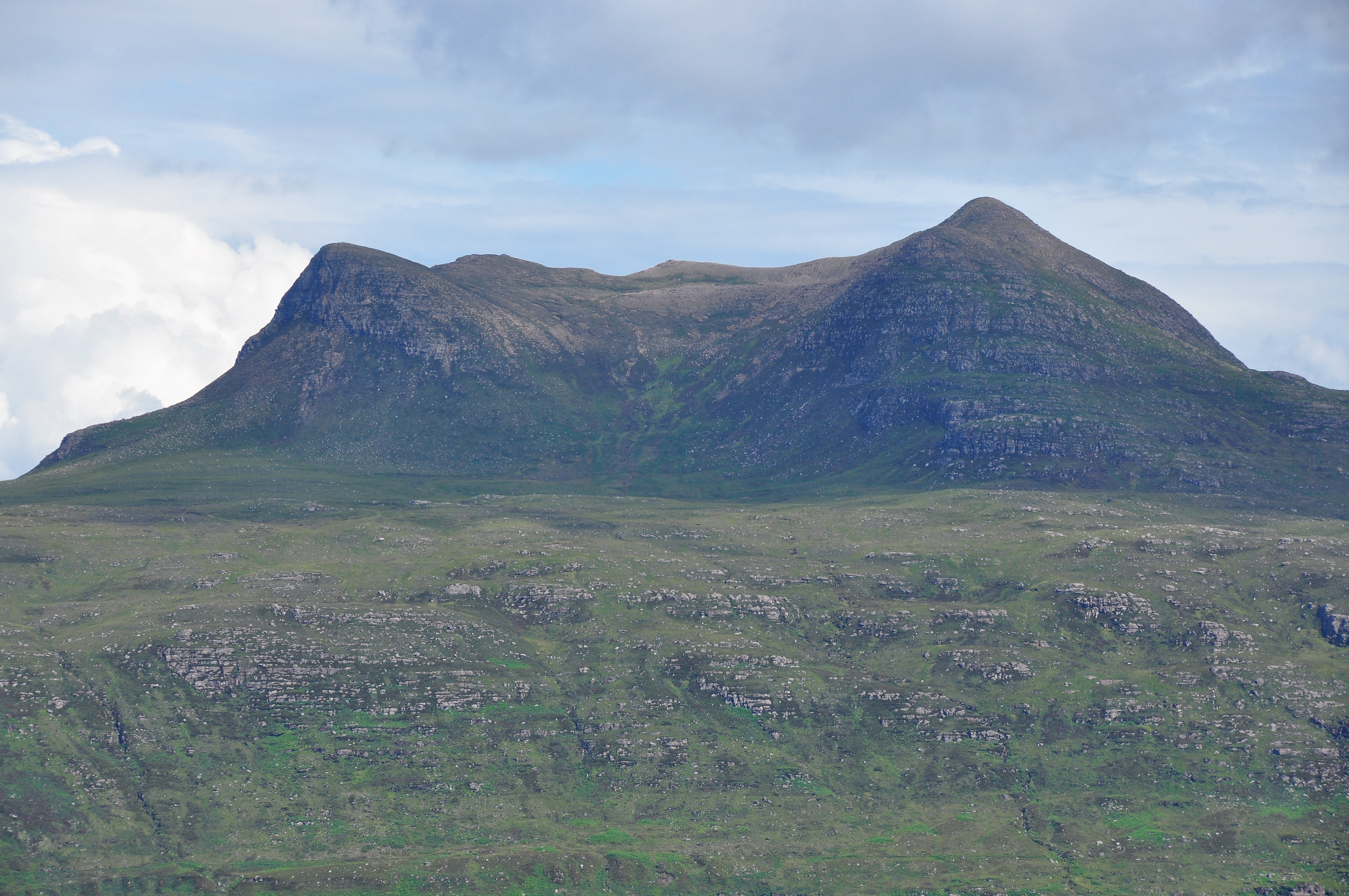

Highest point
- Elevation: 635 m (2,083 ft)
- Prominence: 401 m (1,316 ft)
- Listing: Graham, Marilyn
- Coordinates: 57°53′45″N 5°16′56″W

Geography
- Location: Wester Ross, Scotland
- Parent range: Northwest Highlands
- OS grid: NH055943
- Topo map: OS Landranger 19

Beinn Ghiobhlach (Scottish Gaelic for 'forked mountain') is a mountain with a height of 635 metres (2,083 ft) in the Northwest Highlands of Scotland. It lies on the Scoraig peninsula between the two Loch Brooms in Wester Ross.

Climbs usually start from the village of Badrallach and the peak provides fantastic views from its summit.
