= Badrallach =

Coordinates: 57.8738°N 5.2706°W

Badrallach: Scottish Gaelic: Am Bad Ràilleach
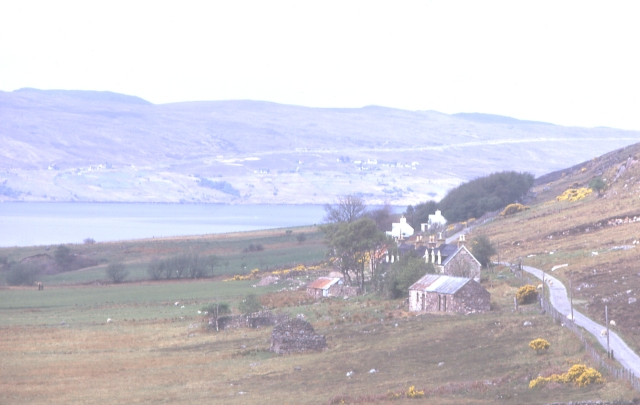
- Badrallach and Little Loch Broom, May 1973

- Location within the Highland council area
- OS grid reference: NH065917
- Council area: Highland
- Country: Scotland
- Sovereign state: United Kingdom
- Police: Scotland
- Fire: Scottish
- Ambulance: Scottish

Badrallach (Scottish Gaelic: Am Bad Ràilleach or Am Bad Tràilleach) is a village on the north shore of Little Loch Broom in Wester Ross, in the Highland council area of Scotland. It is located at the end of a minor road from Dundonnell, and has a holiday cottage, campsite and bunkhouse. A footpath continues from Badrallach to the remote community of Scoraig.
