= Chloe Pirrie =

Scottish actress (born 1987)

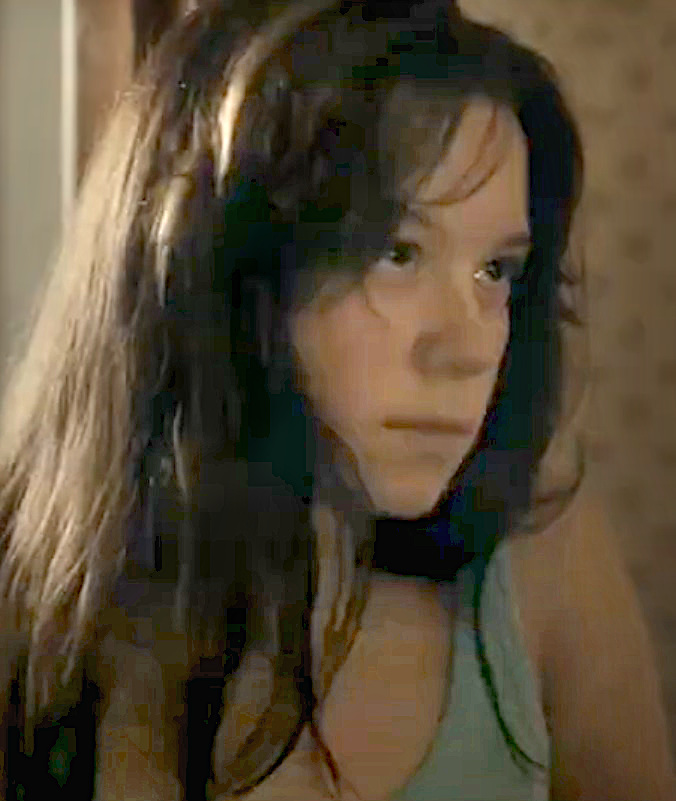
- Pirrie in Shell (2012)
- Born: 1987 (age 38–39); Scotland
- Education: Guildhall School of Music and Drama
- Occupation: Actress
- Years active: 2009–present

Chloe Pirrie (born 1987) is a Scottish actress. She is known for her performances in the 2012 film Shell, and more recently in the TV series Under the Banner of Heaven (2022) and Dept. Q (2025). Other credits include the TV series The Game (2014), War & Peace (2016), The Living and the Dead (2016), Brief Encounters (2016), The Crown (2017), The Queen's Gambit (2020), Carnival Row (2020–2023), Hanna (2021), Industry (2024–26) and The Undeclared War (2026) and the films Youth (2015), Blood Cells (2015), Stutterer (2015), and Emma (2020).

== Early life and education ==
Chloe Pirrie was born in Scotland in 1987 and raised in Stockbridge, Edinburgh. She attended the Mary Erskine School, an independent girls' school in Edinburgh.

She began acting in school and decided to pursue it as a career after being cast in a school production of The Cherry Orchard. Pirrie moved to London at age 18 to attend the Guildhall School of Music and Drama, graduating in 2009.

== Career ==
Pirrie's professional acting career began while she was working as a waitress in a London burger restaurant. She debuted at the Royal National Theatre in a 2010 production of Men Should Weep. Her breakthrough role came in the feature film Shell (2012), a Scottish drama in which Pirrie played the eponymous main character. For this performance she won Most Promising Newcomer at the British Independent Film Awards 2013, and was nominated for Best British Newcomer at the 2012 BFI London Film Festival Awards. In 2013, she played a politician in "The Waldo Moment", an episode of the anthology series Black Mirror. In the same year she was named as one of BAFTA's "Breakthrough Brits",

In 2014, Pirrie starred in the BBC miniseries The Game, a Cold War spy thriller in which she played an MI5 secretary. The following year she appeared as Sheila Birling in Helen Edmundson's BBC One adaptation of J. B. Priestley's An Inspector Calls, in the miniseries The Last Panthers, the British independent film Burn Burn Burn, and the Italian film Youth.

In 2015, she starred as Ellie in the Academy Award winner for Best Live Action Short Film, Stutterer.

She played Julie Karagina in the 2016 BBC miniseries War & Peace and was cast as Emily Brontë in To Walk Invisible, a BBC drama about the Brontë family created by Sally Wainwright. She also starred in episode "In the Footsteps of a Killer" as Grace Matlock, an employee at the Saint Marie Times in Death in Paradise.

She also played Lara in the 2016 BBC thriller series, The Living and the Dead. In 2017, she starred in the Netflix series The Crown, for its second season, playing Eileen Parker. In 2018, she appeared as Andromache in the BBC/Netflix miniseries Troy: Fall of a City.

In 2019, she appeared as prosecutor Ella Mackie in BBC's thriller miniseries The Victim.

In 2020, she appeared in Autumn de Wilde's film adaptation of Jane Austen's novel Emma as Isabella Knightley, elder sister of the titular character played by Anya Taylor-Joy. Later that year she appeared as Alice Harmon, the birth mother of Beth Harmon, also played by Taylor-Joy, in the Netflix miniseries The Queen's Gambit.

In 2025, she appeared in the main cast for the first season of the Netflix series Dept. Q, portraying abducted Crown solicitor Merritt Lingard.

In 2026, she appeared in the main cast for the second season of the Channel 4 series "The Undeclared War" as Lt. Colonel Roz Cavendish.

== Filmography ==
=== Film ===
Year	Title	Role	Notes
2012	Shell	Shell	
2014	Blood Cells	Lauren	
2015	Youth	Girl Screenwriter	
2015	Stutterer	Ellie Parks	Short film
2015	Burn Burn Burn	Alex	
2020	Emma	Isabella Knightley	
2020	Kindred	Jane	
2020	Look the Other Way and Run	Sammy	
2024	Kryptic	Kay Hall	
2026	Sense and Sensibility	Lady Middleton	

=== Television ===
Year	Title	Role	Notes
2010	Doctors	Megan Rios	Episode: "Day Zero"
2013	Black Mirror	Gwendolyn Harris	Episode: "The Waldo Moment"
2013	Misfits	Debbie	Episode #5.5
2014	The Game	Wendy Straw	Main cast
2015	An Inspector Calls	Sheila Birling	TV movie
2015	The Last Panthers	Carla	Recurring role
2016	War & Peace	Julie Karagina	Recurring role
2016	The Living and the Dead	Lara	Recurring role
2016	Brief Encounters	Hellie	Main cast
2016	To Walk Invisible	Emily Brontë	TV movie
2017	Death in Paradise	Grace Matlock	Episode: "In the Footsteps of a Killer"
2017	The Crown	Eileen Parker	3 episodes
2018	Troy: Fall of a City	Andromache	Main cast
2019	The Victim	Ella Mackie	Main cast
2019	Temple	D.I. Karen Hall	Main cast (series 1)
2019–2023	Carnival Row	Dahlia	Recurring role
2020	The Queen's Gambit	Alice Harmon	Main cast
2021	Hanna	Brianna Stapleton	Recurring role (season 3)
2022	Under the Banner of Heaven	Matilda Lafferty	Main cast (miniseries)
2024–26	Industry	Lisa Dearn	Recurring role
2025	Dept. Q	Merritt Lingard	Main cast (season 1)
2026	The Undeclared War	Lt Colonel Roz Cavendish	Main cast (series 2)
