= Camusnagaul =

Village in the Scottish Highlands

Coordinates: 57.84992°N 5.26073°W

Camusnagaul: Scottish Gaelic: Camas nan Gall
- Location within the Ross and Cromarty area
- OS grid reference: NH065891
- Council area: Highland
- Country: Scotland
- Sovereign state: United Kingdom
- Post town: Dundonnell
- Postcode district: IV23 2
- Police: Scotland
- Fire: Scottish
- Ambulance: Scottish

Camusnagaul (Scottish Gaelic: Camas nan Gall) is a village on the south shore of the sea loch, Little Loch Broom in Wester Ross, Scottish Highlands and is in the Scottish council area of Highland.

NB There is also a Camusnagaul at the head of Loch Linnhe and opposite Fort William.
