= Ardcharnich =

Crofting township in Wester Ross, Scotland

Coordinates: 57.84°N 05.08°W

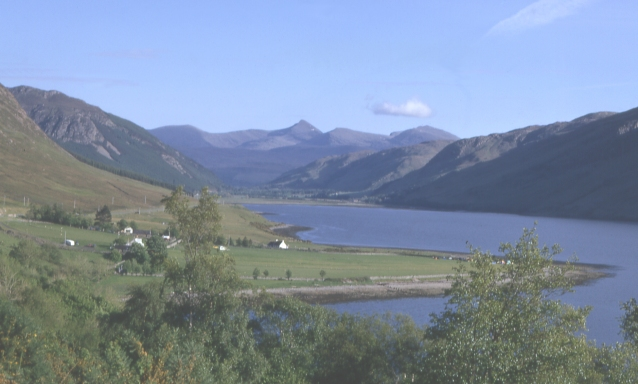
- Ardcharnich and Loch Broom

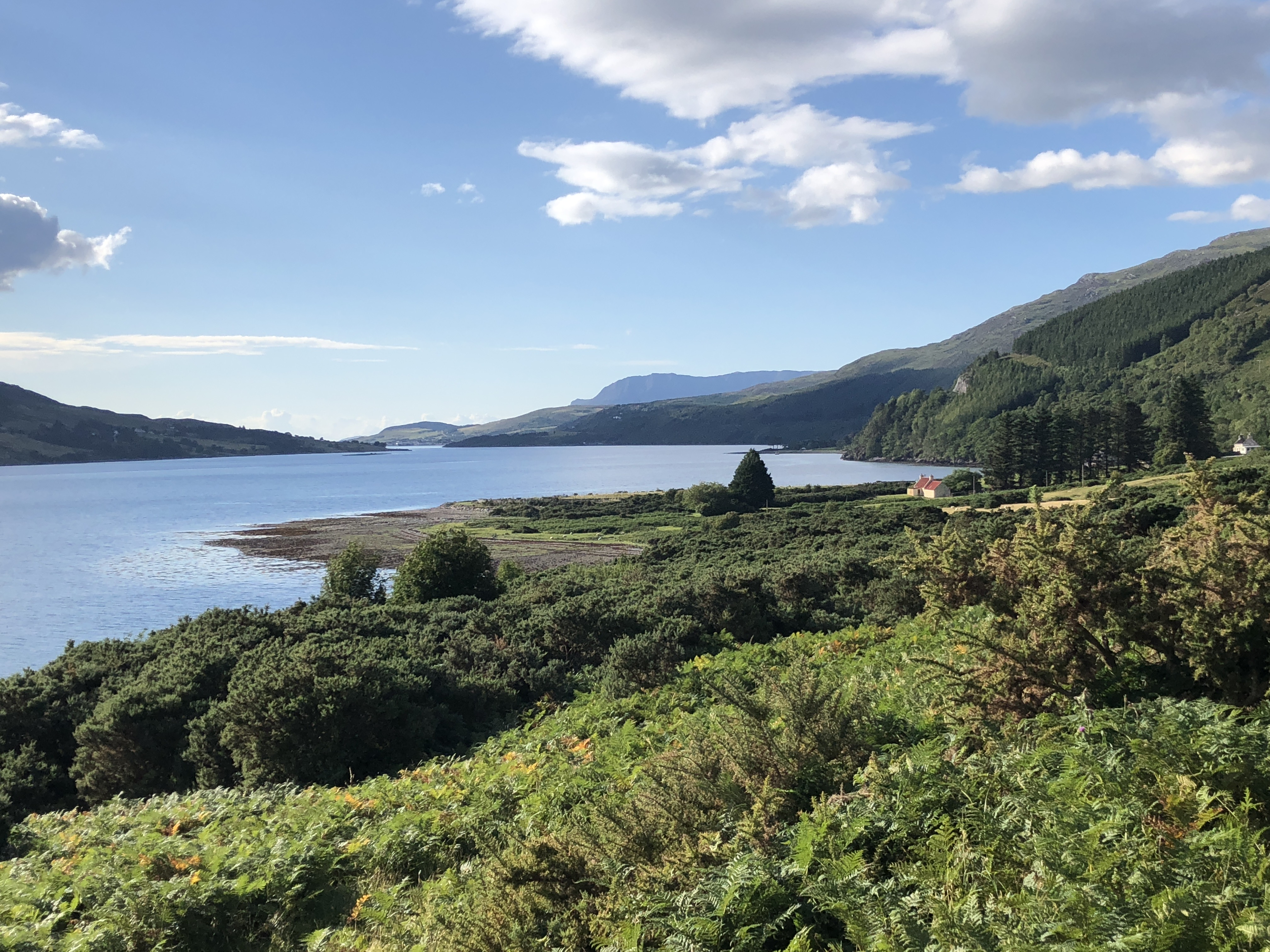
- Ardcharnich and Loch Broom looking northwest

- Location within the Ross and Cromarty area
- OS grid reference: NH1788
- Council area: Highland
- Country: Scotland
- Sovereign state: United Kingdom
- Police: Scotland
- Fire: Scottish
- Ambulance: Scottish
- UK Parliament: Ross, Skye and Lochaber
- Scottish Parliament: Caithness, Sutherland and Ross

Ardcharnich (/ɑːrdˈtʃɑːrnɪx/; Scottish Gaelic: Àird Cheatharnaich) is a crofting township in the parish of Loch Broom, Wester Ross in the Highland, within the Scottish council area of Highland. Scotland. The Gaelic name, Ard Charnaich means "High Cliff", and refers to a prominent inland cliff to the north east of the township which whilst clearly visible from the loch is out of sight of the settlement itself.

== History ==
=== Spelling ===
The name Ardcharnich has been spelled in different ways. The Collectanea de Rebus Albanicis includes a contract from 1628 for the preservation of deer and roe in various estates including Ardchernich. This spelling also appears on an early map drawn by Robert Gordon dated ca. 1636-52. In 1807 a newspaper piece in the Caledonian Mercury advertised the sale of a "valuable sheep farm" in the lands of Inverlael including Ardcharnick. The Handbook for Travellers in Scotland (1875) describes Ardcharnac as a hamlet.

=== Enlargement of holdings appeals ===
In 1890 the estate of Inverlael in the township of Ardcharnich, belonged to Sir Arthur Mackenzie of Coul. Nine crofters from Ardcharnich appealed to Mackenzie for enlargement of their holdings. They argued that since the crofts had been cleared in the early 1800s, this once grazeable land which had been used by their predecessors, had become wild. The crofters said they needed more cultivated lands, that their crofts are poor and in a bad place.

Mackenzie opposed the application for the return of 150 acres but consented to about ten acres, the land and rent to be divided between the applicants. A few years later ca.1902 the Estate was acquired by Mr. W. E. Gilmour. The crofters were once again cleared from the land along with most of the sheep. The land was added to the Inverlael deer forest.

The crofters made a second appeal for enlargement. The application for land was opposed by Mr. Gilmour. He argued that the land was essential to him for the preservation of his forest, or as a farm if he needed it. The Crofting Commission found that his arguments were unfounded, and that the applicants needed the land. Twenty three acres were granted to the crofters, subject to suitable fencing being erected.

In March 1911 the crofters or their successors applied for the grazing land previously requested in 1890. At the time the Commission felt that this was not feasible as it would require a large amount of fencing. On inspection it was found that the applicants holdings were small and they were in need of enlargement. It was also found that the small size of their holdings was due to the previous actions of the former proprietors of the Estate. With the help of the Commission enough fencing was purchased and the crofters were assigned 847 acres of grazing ground, to be divided between their households with a total rent of £21, 3s, or £2, 7s for each of nine shares.
