= Isle Martin =

Uninhabited island in Loch Broom on the west coast of Scotland

Eilean Mhàrtainn (Gaelic)
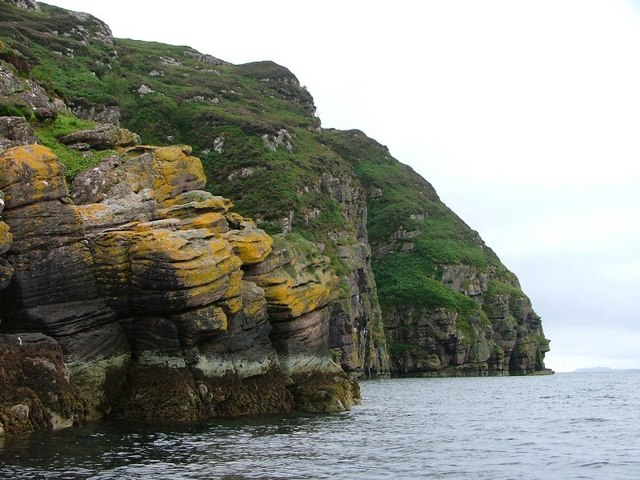
- The northern coast of Isle Martin is made up entirely of sea cliffs

Location
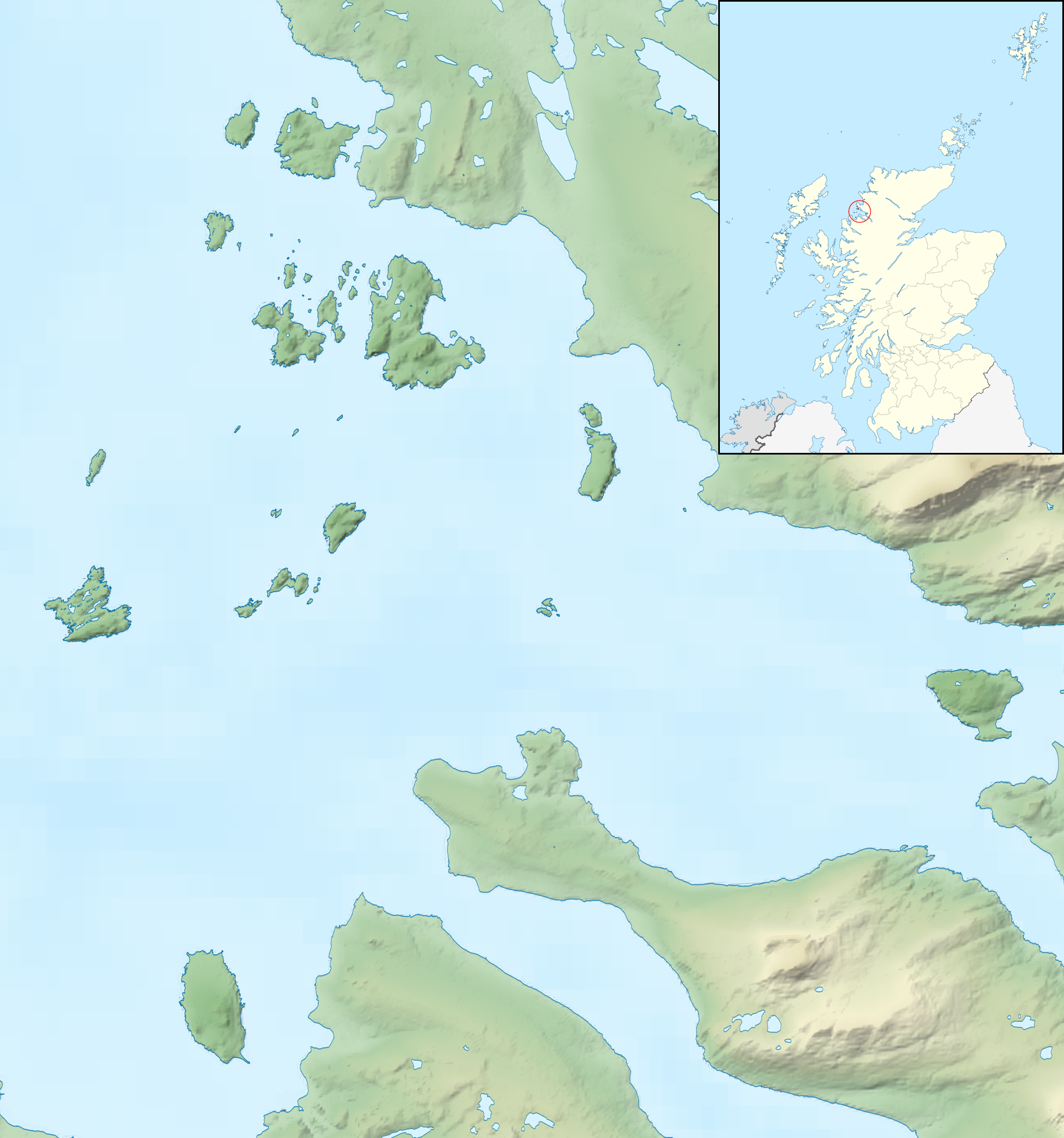
- Isle Martin shown within the Summer Isles Isle Martin shown within the Highlands
- OS grid reference: NH091995
- Coordinates: 57.945°N 5.225°W

Name
- Name meaning: St Martin's Isle

Physical geography
- Island group: Summer Isles
- Area: 157 ha (5/8 sq mi)
- Area rank: 120
- Highest elevation: 120 m (394 ft)

Administration
- Council area: Highland
- Country: Scotland
- Sovereign state: United Kingdom

Demographics
- Population: 0

Isle Martin (Scottish Gaelic: Eilean Mhàrtainn) is an uninhabited island in Loch Broom, on the west coast of Scotland. It is the closest of the Summer Isles to Ullapool and has been the site of a monastery, a herring curing station and a flour mill. Now recognised as a bird sanctuary, it is owned and managed by a community trust.

== History ==
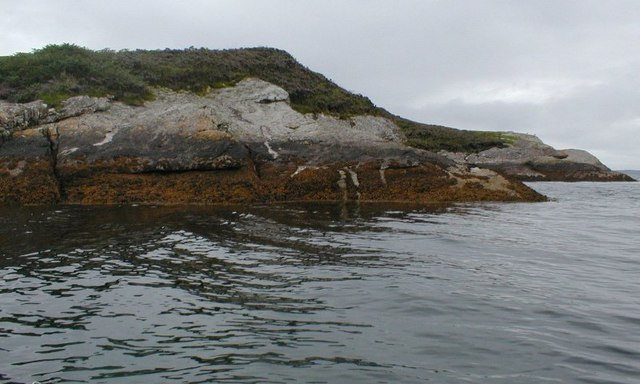
Ceatha Chaluim Ruaidh on the north west tip of Isle Martin.

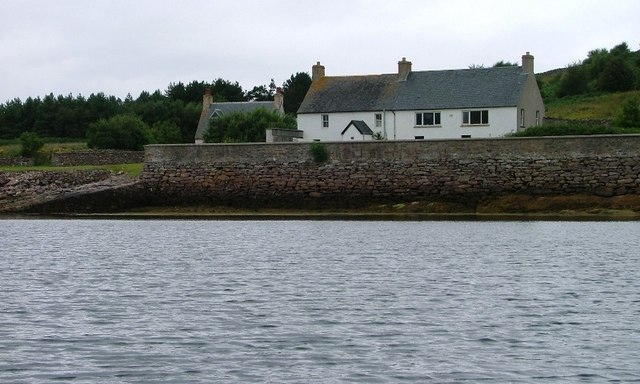
The pier on Isle Martin. Behind the wall is the ranger's house, the only occupied house on the island. The island is owned by The Isle Martin Trust, a local charitable trust.

Despite its name, it has no association with St Martin. The old Gaelic name for the island is 'Ellan Mertack'. It was recorded in the sixteenth century and probably refers to the 'martrick', an old word for pine martens. A monastery is reputed to have been established on the island around 300–400 AD. There is a stone with a Latin triple cross, possibly from 400 to 700 AD, which is probably related to the Celtic church. There is also a post-Reformation chapel/meeting house and the ruins of an old street of houses with the old school. Other houses and the "new" school are located near the current jetty.

Agriculture and fishing have been the mainstays of the island economy for most of its history. It was a centre for the fishing trade, with a curing station, before Ullapool was founded. The island was lotted into crofts in 1831 and crofting continued until the 1960s. Predominantly used for cattle and sheep grazing, there was limited arable land at the southern end near the main settlement.

A flour mill operated on the site of the old herring station site between 1939 and 1948. Most of the mill workers were ferried daily to the island, but some housing was constructed at this time. Wheat was carried to an island wharf by sailing ship and flour transported back to Ullapool, from where it was distributed to bakeries across the north of Scotland. Sacks were labelled "Isle Martin Flour Mills". After the mill closed, its buildings and wharves were dismantled in 1948.

In the 1960s Monica Goldsmith purchased Isle Martin and took it out of crofting tenure. She mainly ran it for nature conservancy purposes, introducing a number of improvements, including installing water and power supplies, and clearing sheep from the island in 1969. In 1980 she gave the island to the Royal Society for the Protection of Birds (RSPB) on the understanding that it would be managed for conservation.

From around 1980 to 1985, the late writer Andro Linklater lived in the Mill House while writing his acclaimed biography of Compton Mackenzie. Bernard Planterose, working for the RSPB, lived on the island with his family in the 1980s, and instituted an ambitious programme of broad-leaved woodland regeneration behind the protection of extensive rabbit fencing. He carried out experimental work on plant populations, plantations and fertilisation of trees. RSPB recorded visiting and breeding birds and surveyed their populations. However, the location of the island and its particular attributes made it difficult for the RSPB to fulfil its aims and remit, and by the middle of 1996 they were looking to dispose of Isle Martin. In May 1999, with the active encouragement of Mrs Goldsmith's daughter, Miss Oriole Goldsmith, the RSPB gifted the island to a trust proposed and established by the communities of Loch Broom and Coigach, The Isle Martin Trust.

=== Today ===
The Isle Martin Trust has improved the jetty on the mainland at Ardmair Bay and now operates a seasonal ferry service to the island. In 2007 a new pontoon was installed. They have refurbished some of the houses and one is available to rent. Guided walks and other events have been arranged.
