= Badcaul =

Human settlement in Highland, Scotland

Coordinates: 57.86°N 05.33°W

- Location within the Ross and Cromarty area
- OS grid reference: NH0291
- Council area: Highland
- Country: Scotland
- Sovereign state: United Kingdom
- Post town: GARVE
- Postcode district: IV23
- Dialling code: 01854
- Police: Scotland
- Fire: Scottish
- Ambulance: Scottish
- UK Parliament: Ross, Cromarty and Skye

Badcaul (Scottish Gaelic: Bada Call) is a village in Highland, Scotland, on the southern shore of Little Loch Broom and is a village in the Highland council area of Scotland.

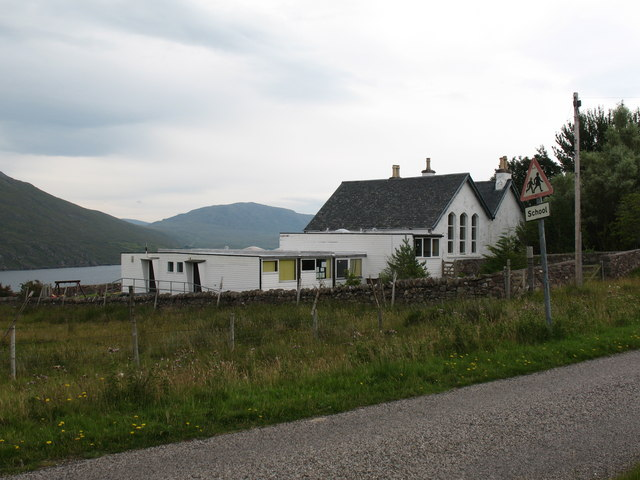
The primary school at Badcaul
