= Scoraig =

Coordinates: 57.9152°N 5.365°W

Scoraig: Scottish Gaelic: Sgoraig
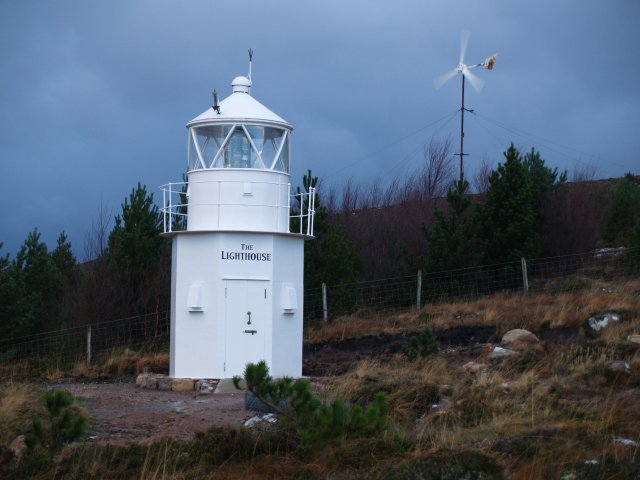
- The old lighthouse at Scoraig (moved to this site and converted to a museum), and in the background a locally designed wind turbine.

- Location within the Ross and Cromarty area
- Council area: Highland
- Lieutenancy area: Ross and Cromarty
- Country: Scotland
- Sovereign state: United Kingdom
- Post town: GARVE
- Postcode district: IV23
- Police: Scotland
- Fire: Scottish
- Ambulance: Scottish

Scoraig (Scottish Gaelic: Sgoraig) is a settlement located on a remote peninsula between Little Loch Broom and Loch Broom, north-west of Ullapool in Ross and Cromarty, Highland, Scotland.

The 1871 census recorded more than 380 Gaelic-speaking inhabitants of Scoraig. Today it is known for its remoteness (reachable only by boat or about five miles' walk), its somewhat "alternative" atmosphere, organic food production, and its pioneering use of wind power.

There is a primary school, which in 2015 had five pupils, and in 2018, seven. Most children over the age of 14 go to Ullapool High School, which because of the distance requires living there at least during the week. There is postal service three times a week, and a sea-ferry and a community boat serve the settlement in addition to private boats.
