= Ullapool =

Coordinates: 57.900°N 5.166°W

Ullapool: Scottish Gaelic: Ulapul
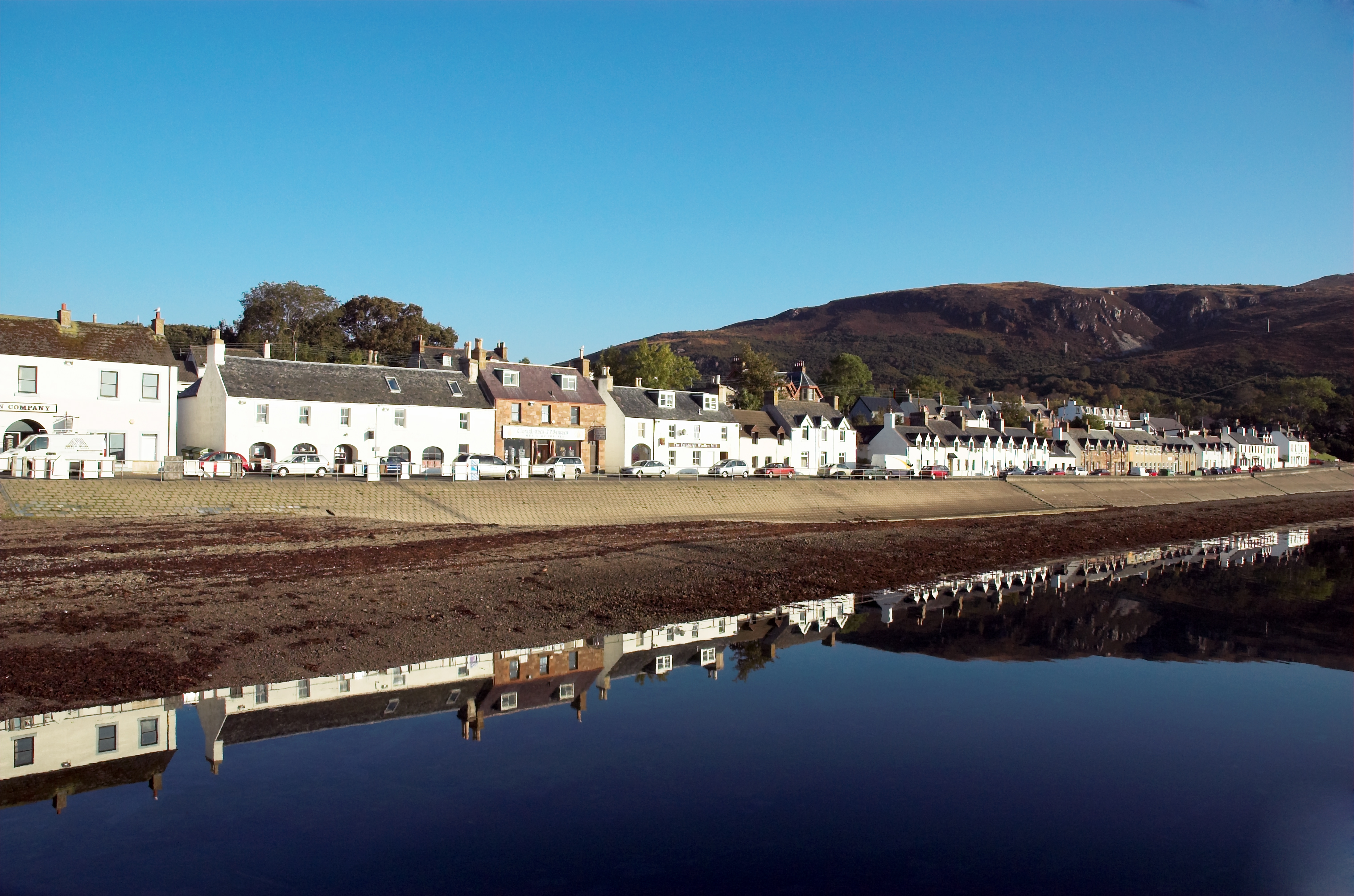
- Ullapool

- Location within the Ross and Cromarty area
- Population: 1,500 (2020)
- OS grid reference: NH125945
  - Edinburgh: 153 mi (246 km)
  - London: 485 mi (781 km)
- Civil parish: Lochbroom
- Council area: Highland
- Lieutenancy area: Ross and Cromarty
- Country: Scotland
- Sovereign state: United Kingdom
- Post town: ULLAPOOL
- Postcode district: IV26
- Dialling code: 01854
- Police: Scotland
- Fire: Scottish
- Ambulance: Scottish
- UK Parliament: Caithness, Sutherland and Easter Ross
- Scottish Parliament: Caithness, Sutherland and Ross

Ullapool (/ˈʌləpuːl/; Scottish Gaelic: Ulapul [ˈul̪ˠapʰul̪ˠ]) is a village and port located in the civil parish of Lochbroom in the county of Ross and Cromarty, Scottish Highlands. It is located around 45 miles (70 kilometres) northwest of Inverness. According to the Scottish Government in 2016, the village had a population of 1,520 people, making it the largest settlement in Wester Ross.

Ullapool sits on a deep sea loch, Loch Broom, a significant natural harbour. As a result, Ullapool's port is regionally significant with ferries operated by Caledonian MacBrayne running from Ullapool to Stornoway on the Isle of Lewis. It also serves leisure craft, commercial fishing vessels and cruise ships.

The A835 road from Inverness to Durness passes through the village. This forms part of the scenic tourist route, the North Coast 500.

== History ==
On the east shore of Loch Broom, Ullapool was founded in 1788 as a herring port by the British Fisheries Society. It was designed by Thomas Telford. Prior to 1788 the town was only an insignificant hamlet made up of just over 20 households. The harbour is used as a fishing port, yachting haven, and ferry port.

A road to link Ullapool with Dingwall was commenced in 1792. The village was historically in Cromartyshire, a county made up of many separate enclaves scattered across northern Ross-shire. Cromartyshire was abolished and combined with surrounding Ross-shire in 1890.

Ullapool has been described as the top geological hotspot in Scotland.

Parliament granted permission in the 1890s for a railway from Ullapool to the main Highland network at Garve railway station.

The name is possibly derived from the Norse word for "wool farm" or "Ulli's farm".

== Landscape and geology ==
The region surrounding Ullapool is dominated by rugged mountains, and especially by Bheinn Ghobhlach to the west, An Teallach to the southwest (both across the loch), Beinn Dearg to the southeast close to the head of Loch Broom, and Beinn Mhòr na Còigich to the north. These summits are referred to as periglacial enclaves, a term used to describe areas that were adjacent to glaciers and impacted by cold climates.

An Teallach is a mountain which dominates the area and consists of Torridonian sandstone, which is layered nearly horizontally. It is a challenging climb and a considerable distance from the nearest road. Climbing affords views to the sea and the islands to the west, but also to the south, and the desolate Whitbread wilderness.

Ullapool sits on a substantial geological structure known as the Moine Thrust Belt. This geological feature spans a considerable distance from Loch Eriboll in the north, extending southwards to the Isle of Skye. The Moine Thrust Belt represents the western margin of the Caledonian orogeny which took place during the Palaeozoic era.

== Culture ==
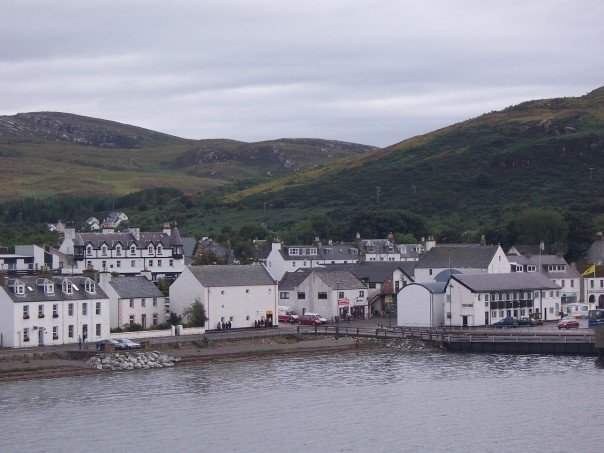
Ullapool

Venues for music and the performing arts in Ullapool include the Macphail Centre, which is located in the High School and includes a small theatre, and The Ceilidh Place, a hotel, restaurant, and music venue which has previously held concerts by artists including Rab Noakes, Dick Gaughan, Kathleen MacInnes, and The Peatbog Faeries. The Ullapool Guitar Festival is also held annually in the village.

An talla solais, an arts center, is located in the village, along with a swimming pool and fitness center, and several pubs, restaurants, and tourist accommodation facilities. The 19th, and final, Ullapool Book Festival was held in the village in May 2023. The Tall Ships visited Ullapool in July 2011, whilst sailing from Greenock to Lerwick.

Ullapool was home to the shinty team Lochbroom Camanachd; however, the club has not completed a competitive fixture since 2015.

== Music ==
Throughout the year there are many small fèisean and music festivals in the local halls and hotels, especially in the Ceilidh Place and the Arch Inn. The Ullapool Guitar Festival takes place in early October each year, attracting performers at several venues over the weekend.

The Loopallu Festival, created by the American rock-grass band Hayseed Dixie and local promoter Robert Hicks in 2005, was well received and has become a major regional annual event, more than doubling the size of the village during the festival. In 2007 it attracted several bands including The Saw Doctors, Dreadzone and Franz Ferdinand headlining on the second night. There are also fringe events at local bars. The Pigeon Detectives have played the Village Hall. Amy MacDonald in 2008 and Paolo Nutini in 2007 both played the Ceilidh Place. Mumford & Sons have also played in Ullapool twice. The final festival took place in 2019.

Since 2023, the village has hosted Scotland's "most remote club night", called baile/baile, which showcases local and national DJs.

Ullapool has a local radio station called Lochbroom FM broadcasting on 102.2 and 96.8 FM and online, with programming provided mostly by Two Lochs Radio in Gairloch.

== In popular culture ==
The community was rated as among the "20 most beautiful villages in the UK and Ireland" by Condé Nast Traveler in 2020.

The fictional X-Men character Rahne Sinclair was born in Ullapool.

Ullapool is referenced in the multiplayer video game Team Fortress 2 as the hometown of Tavish Finnegan DeGroot, known in-game as the Demoman.

== Ferry service ==
In 1970, Ross and Cromarty council voted to create a new £460,000 (equivalent to £6,038,200 in 2023) ferry terminal at Ullapool, 43 miles (69 km) from Stornoway, replacing that at the Kyle of Lochalsh that is 71 miles (114 km) from Stornoway. The ferry terminal is linked to the A835 trunk road with the A893. During 2022 the Ullapool Harbour Trust commenced a £4.3 million project to construct a new promenade and wider access road along the trunk road which will improve the inner harbour, provide pontoons for marine tourism and provide better access for pedestrians and cyclists. At the terminal Caledonian MacBrayne operates a roll-on/roll-off carferry to Stornoway on the Isle of Lewis.

== Gallery ==
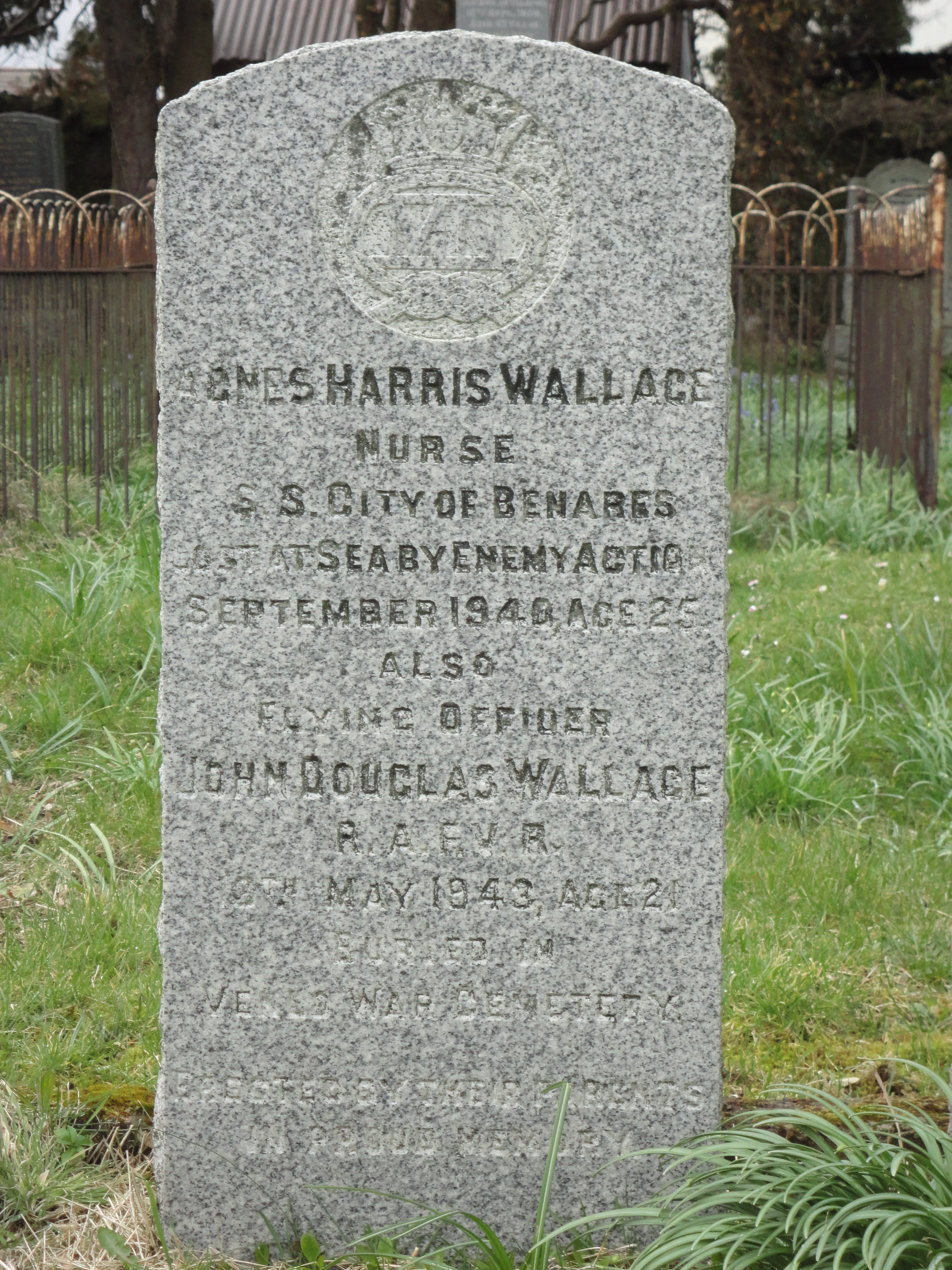
Old Telford Church: memorial to J H Wallace, lost in the sinking of the SS City of Benares

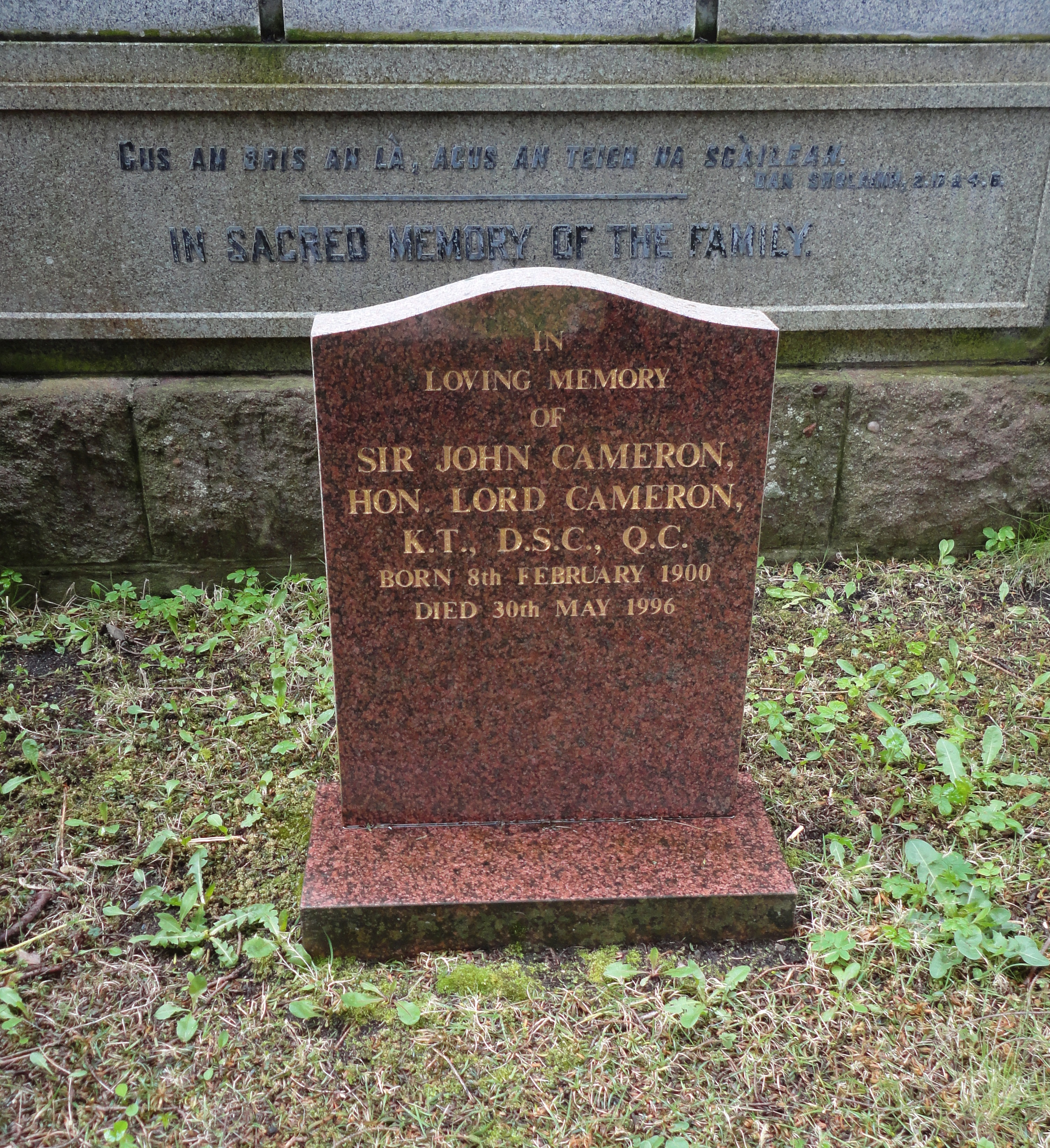
Mill Street Old Burial Ground: grave of Lord Cameron, KTDSC

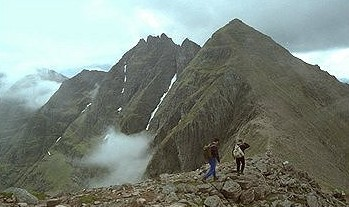
Sgurr Fiona and the Corrag Bhuidhe pinnacles on An Teallach

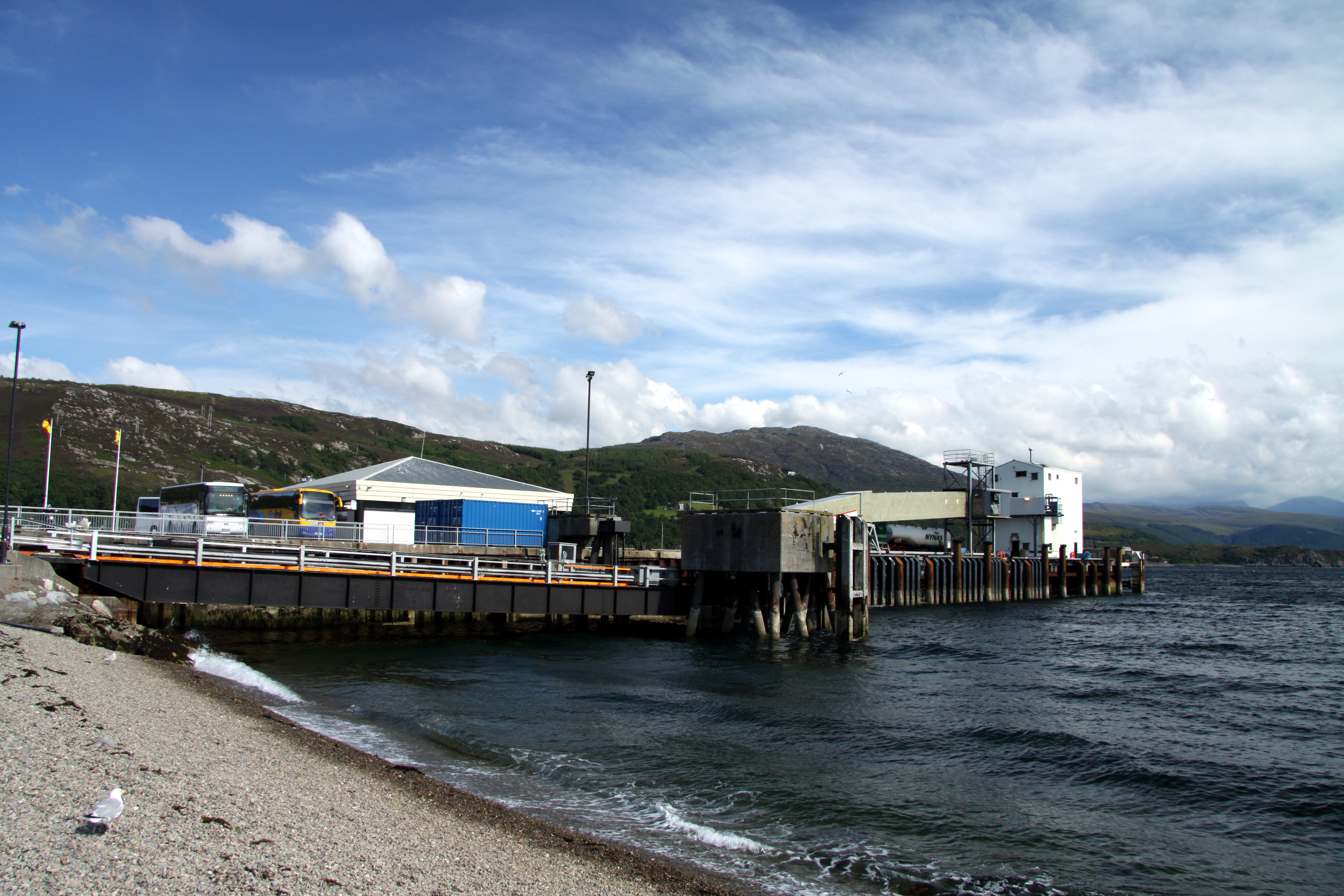
Ullapool Ferry Terminal

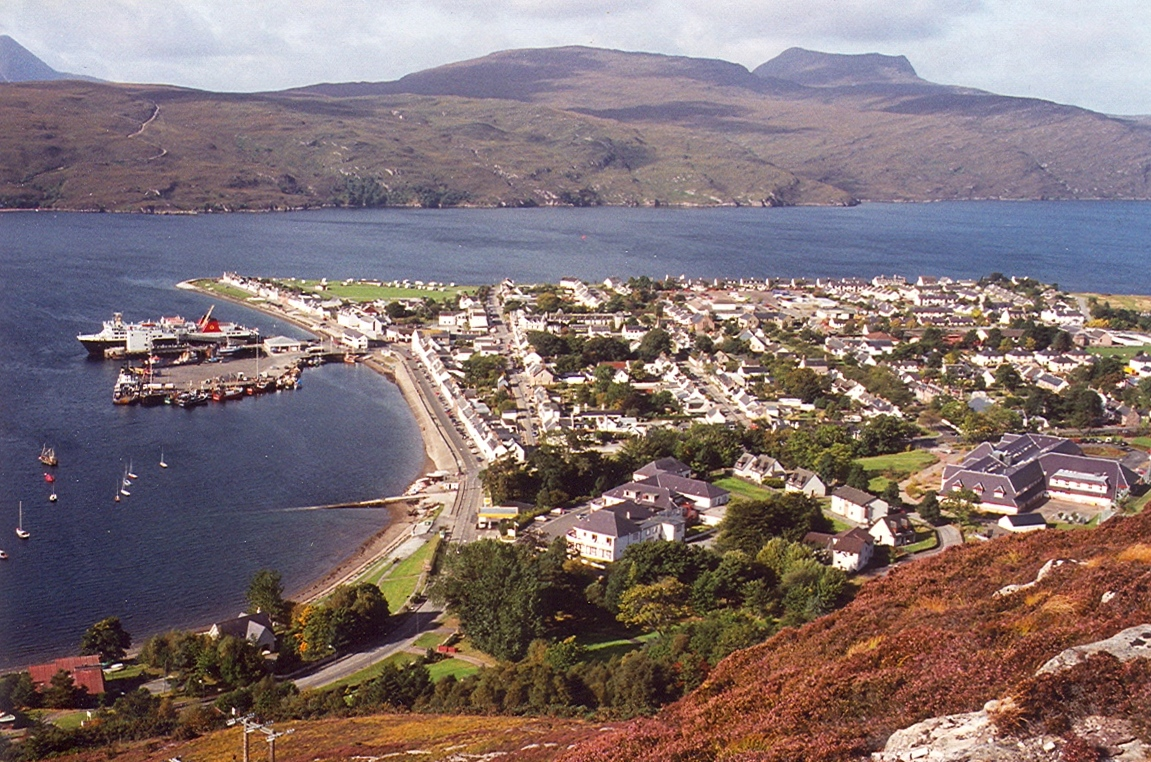
A view of Ullapool from a nearby hill (Maol Calaisceig)

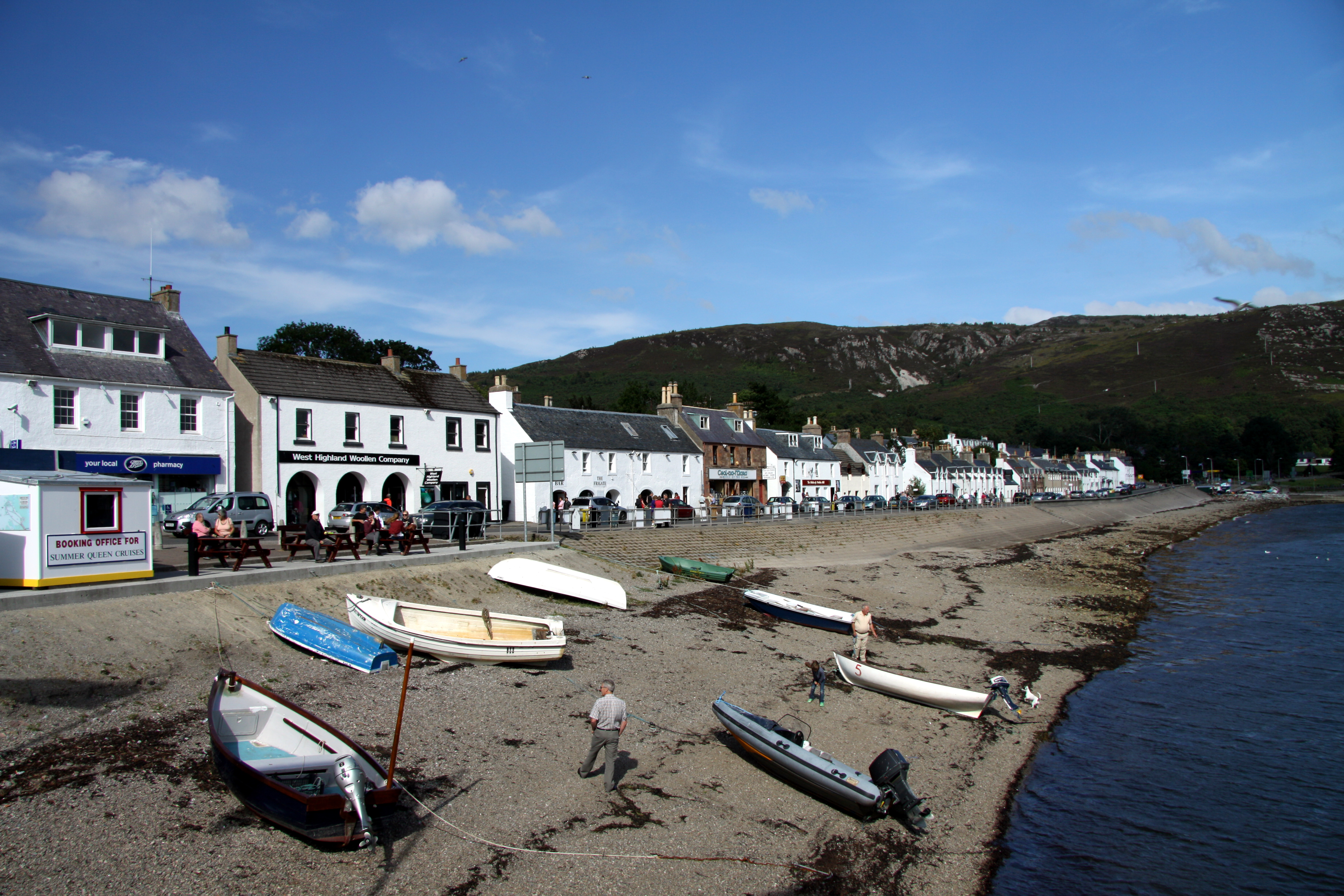
A view of buildings along Shore Street, with Loch Broom in foreground

== Climate ==
Ullapool has an oceanic climate (Köppen: Cfb) with, considering its northerly latitude, relatively mild temperatures year-round. With an average 1,105 sunshine hours per year, it is cloudier than any major city in Europe.

Climate data for Ullapool (1 m asl, averages 1981-2010)
Month	Jan	Feb	Mar	Apr	May	Jun	Jul	Aug	Sep	Oct	Nov	Dec	Year
Mean daily maximum °C (°F)	5.1 (41.2)	5.5 (41.9)	7.0 (44.6)	10.0 (50.0)	13.4 (56.1)	15.3 (59.5)	17.2 (63.0)	16.6 (61.9)	14.4 (57.9)	10.8 (51.4)	7.5 (45.5)	5.2 (41.4)	10.7 (51.2)
Mean daily minimum °C (°F)	−1.2 (29.8)	−1.1 (30.0)	0.2 (32.4)	1.6 (34.9)	3.9 (39.0)	7.1 (44.8)	9.1 (48.4)	8.8 (47.8)	6.6 (43.9)	4.0 (39.2)	1.3 (34.3)	−1.4 (29.5)	3.2 (37.8)
Average rainfall mm (inches)	236.3 (9.30)	164.0 (6.46)	175.3 (6.90)	94.0 (3.70)	87.7 (3.45)	85.7 (3.37)	98.2 (3.87)	103.5 (4.07)	150.3 (5.92)	199.5 (7.85)	191.8 (7.55)	180.5 (7.11)	1,766.8 (69.55)
Average rainy days (≥ 1 mm)	19.7	17.0	20.4	16.0	14.7	14.2	14.9	16.5	17.4	20.1	19.2	17.2	207.3
Mean monthly sunshine hours	26	54	85	134	186	151	127	125	96	66	34	21	1,105
Source 1:
Source 2:

== See also ==
- Morefield
- Stac Fada Member, distinctive geology resulting from the largest bolide impact ever to strike what are now the British Isles
