= Loch Broom =

Sea loch on the west coast of Scotland

- Loch Bhraoin (Scottish Gaelic)
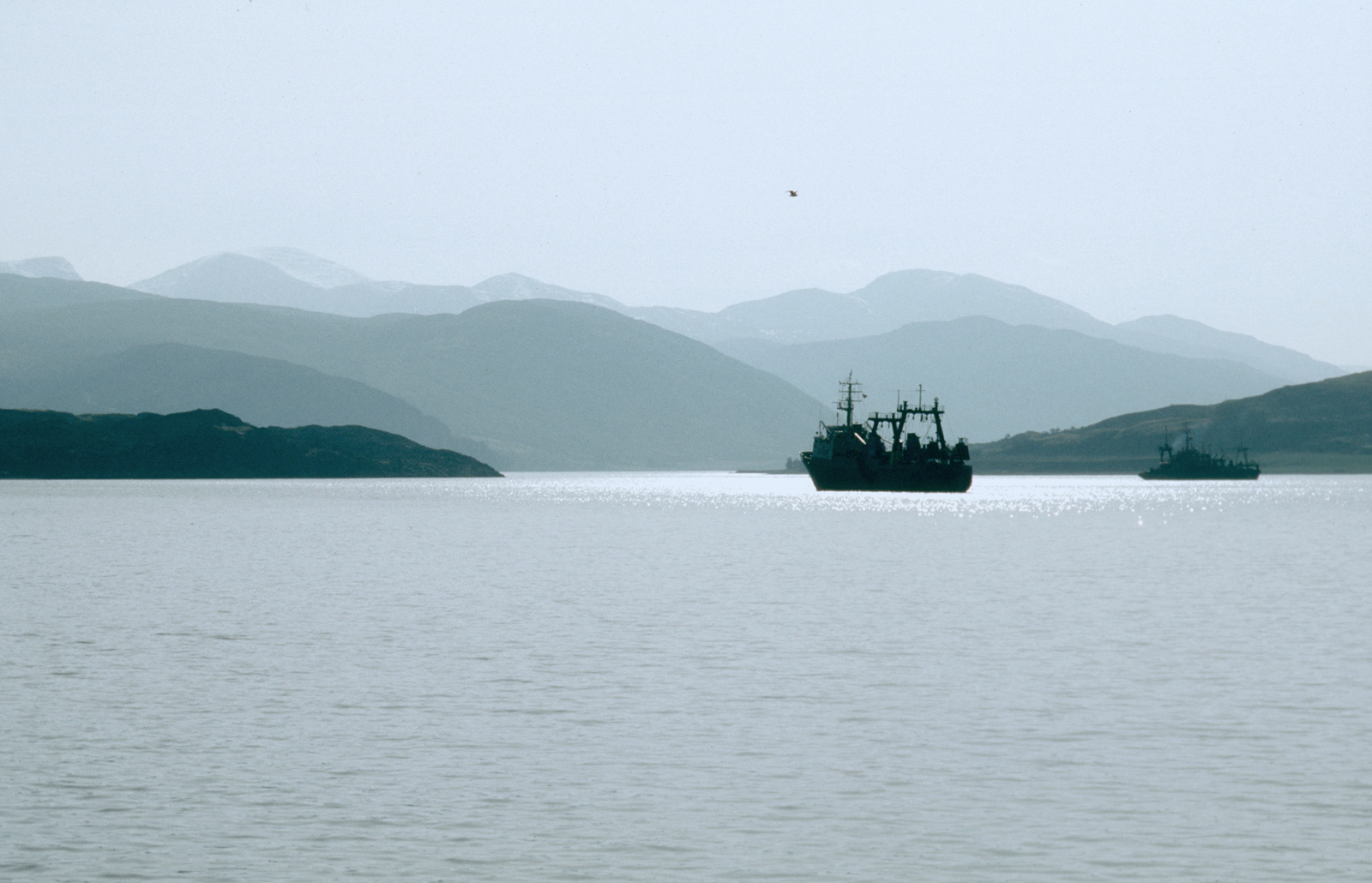

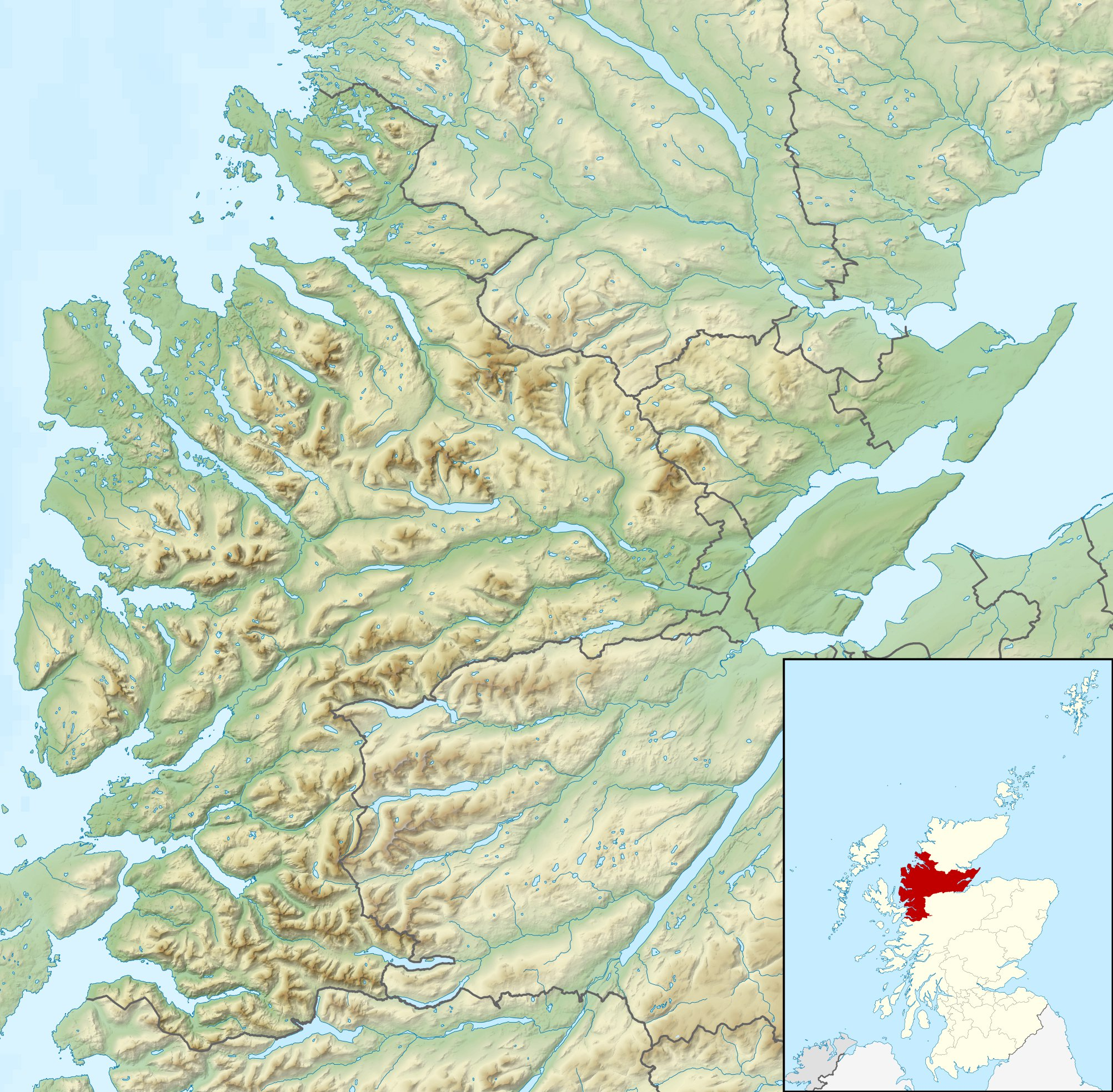
- Location within Ross and Cromarty
- Location: Scotland
- Coordinates: 57.891°N 5.165°W
- Basin countries: Scotland

Loch Broom (Scottish Gaelic: Lochbraon, "loch of rain showers") is a sea loch located in northwestern Ross and Cromarty, in the former parish of Lochbroom, on the west coast of Scotland. The small town of Ullapool lies on the eastern shore of the loch.

== Little Loch Broom ==
Its sister loch, Little Loch Broom (Scottish Gaelic: An Loch Beag, "the little loch"), lies just to the west, at the foot of An Teallach and opening into the Minch. The village of Dundonnell is located at the mouth of the loch, linked by the A832 coast road to Camusnagaul on the eastern shore, midway up the loch, and Badcaul further north. The loch is an important wildlife habitat, and a population of cormorants often bask on the rocks jutting out of the water.

== Geography ==
=== Loch Broom ===
Loch Broom is fed by the River Broom which rises in the Dirrie mountains, issuing from two lochs: Loch Bhraoin and Loch Droma. Loch Broom feeds the River Cuileig, which is joined by the Allt Breabaig stream that rises in Sgùrr Breac to the south. Loch Droma feeds the river Droma. The two rivers join close to Cuileig Power Station, 4 3/4 miles (7.5 kilometres) southeast of Loch Broom, passing Lael Forest before joining the loch as a fast flowing river with a strong current.

Loch Broom opens from the Minch at a width of 12 1/2 mi (20 km), extends 7 miles (11 km) southeast, and contains the Summer Isles. It ramifies into Loch Broom proper in the North, with the sea loch, Loch Kanaird to the northeast close to Isle Martin, which overlooks Annat Bay on the Scoraig peninsula to the west which separates Loch Broom from Little Loch Broom in the middle and Gruinard Bay in the South.

At its opening to the sea, Loch Broom is 4 mi (6 km) wide, and extends 5 mi (8 km) southeast; contracts to 1 mi (1.5 km) wide and changes direction to south-south-eastward and goes for about 9 1/2 mi (15.5 km), where it is fed by the River Broom.

=== Little Loch Broom ===
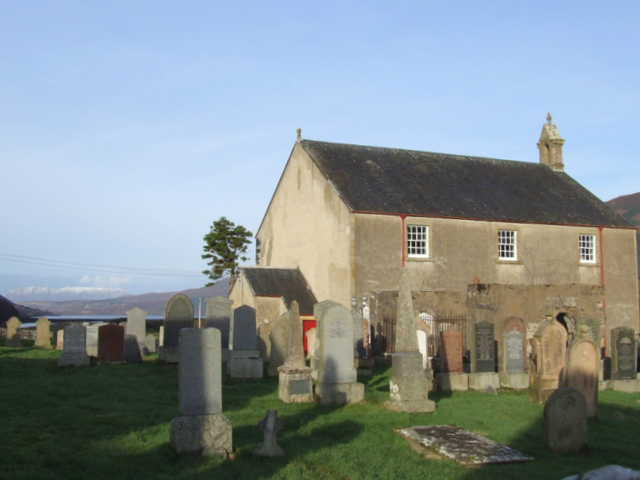
Loch Broom Parish Church at Clachan.

Little Loch Broom is separated from Loch Broom by the Scoraig peninsula between 2 and 4 mi (3–6 km) wide commencing in Caileach Head. The loch is 9 1/2 mi (15.5 km) long, orientated in a south-eastward direction, similar to Loch Broom, and has a mean breadth of 1 mi (1.5 km).

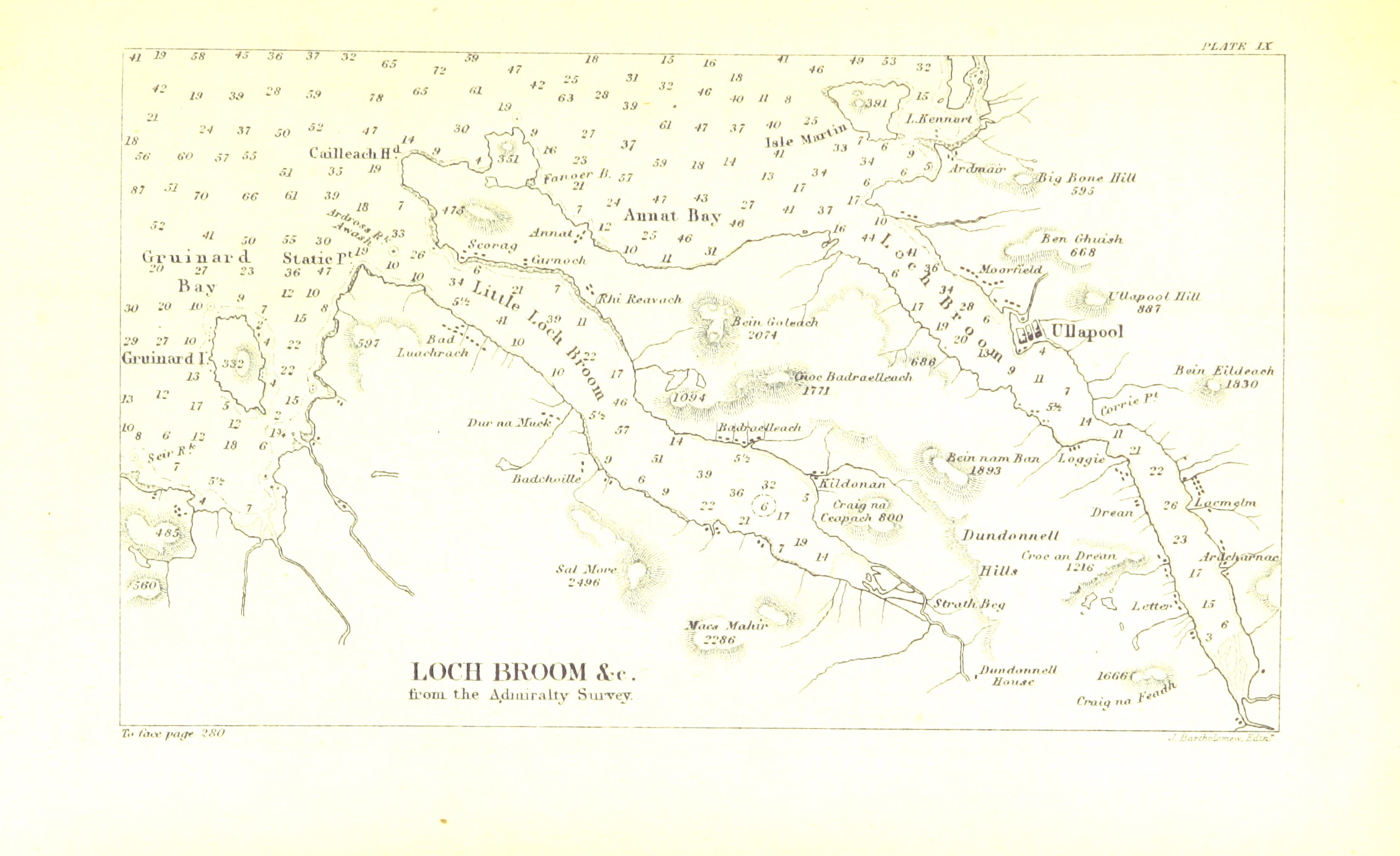
Map of the Great Ice Age by James Geikie (1877)

Two rivers flow into Little Loch Broom; the Allt Airdeasaidh empties into the Loch at Ardessie Falls and Dundonnell River, which rises in the Dundonnell forest 3 mi (5 km) southeast of the loch and the innumerable small lochs and rivers that are in the forest.

== Mountains ==
The entrance to Loch Broom is overlooked by mountain of Ben More Coigach, at 2,438 feet (743 m), on the Coigach peninsula, which has a view of Isle Martin and Loch Kanaird. The peninsula separating Loch Broom from Little Loch Broom contains the mountains of Beinn Ghobhlach and Beinn nam Ban. The Marilyn, Beinn Ghobhlach at 2,083 ft (635 m), is located at the head of the peninsula, overlooks the entrance to Loch Broom proper, to the northeast and Little Loch Broom to the south. It has a commanding view of Gruinard Bay and Gruinard Island to the west.

Beinn nam Ban – at 1,900 ft (580 m), also a Marilyn – is located at the base of the peninsula, overlooks Dundonnell to the southwest and Loch Broom to the west and south.

Lying southwest of Dundonnell, overlooking Little Loch Broom, and Gruinard Bay and Gruinard Island, to the northwest, lies the majestic ridge of An Teallach (meaning "The Anvil" or "The Forge" in Scottish Gaelic), with 10 mountains over 3,000 ft (914.4 m). These summits of An Teallach are thus Munros.

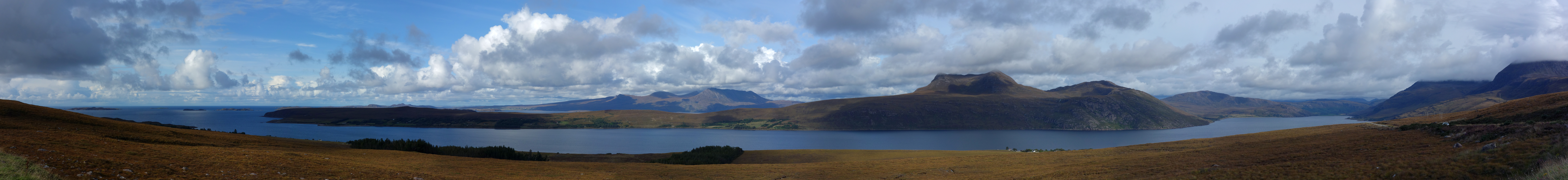
View north of Little Loch Broom from the A832
