= A roads in Zone 8 of the Great Britain numbering scheme =

The numbering zones for A-roads in Great Britain

List of A roads in zone 8 in Great Britain starting north of the A8 and west of the A9 (roads beginning with 8).

== Single- and double-digit roads ==
Road	From	To	Notes
A8	Greenock	Edinburgh	25-mile (40-kilometre) gap between Newbridge and Newhouse
A80	Glasgow	Moodiesburn	
A81	Glasgow	Callander	
A82	Glasgow	Inverness	
A83	Tarbet	Campbeltown	
A84	Stirling	Lochearnhead	
A85	Oban	Dundee	
A86	Spean Bridge	Kingussie	
A87	Invergarry	Uig	Originally ended in Kyle of Lochalsh; extended over part of the A850 and all of the A856 in 1995.
A88	Larbert	Stenhousemuir	Shortest two-digit road in the UK. Previously allocated to a road from Inverness to Scrabster; this became part of an extended A9 (the section north of Latheron as now part of the A99) and the rest was renumbered the A882 (the section north of Georgemas is now part of the A9)
A89	Glasgow	Newbridge	

== Triple-digit roads ==
Road	From	To	Notes
A800	Bathgate	Westfield	
A801	East Whitburn	Polmont	
A802	Unused		Ran from Buchanan Street in Glasgow to A8 (now Westmuir Street) in Parkhead. Declassified in the 1970s.
A803	Glasgow	Champany, Falkirk	
A804	Glasgow	Dumbarton	Mostly incorporated by A82 and A814. Previously allocated to Sauchiehall Street and Parliamentary Road (now gone due to gentrification of central Glasgow and Townhead in the 1960s) from Argyle Street (then the A814) to the A803; this was declassified when the M8 started construction, and the A804 was moved to its current route.
A805	Unused		Ran from Argyle Street (then the A82) via Buchanan Street (southern section now pedestrianized; north section now gone, replaced by Glasgow Royal Concert Hall and a parking garage) to the A81. Became part of a rerouted A82 (the Argyle Street section of the A82 became part of the A814) in 1935 and was declassified in the 1960s-1970s.
A806	Kirkintilloch	Stepps	Created in 2010 as a renumbering and extension of the A8006. Previously allocated to a road from A81 north of Anniesland to Scotstoun; this is now the A739 and the unclassified Anniesland Road.
A807	Torrance	Milngavie	
A808	Bearsden	Bearsden	
A809	Bearsden	A811 near Croftamie and Drymen	
A810	Bearsden	Duntocher	
A811	Balloch	Stirling	Swapped with the A813 when the A82 bypass was built.
A812	Dennystown	Renton	The original route was on Bank Street and Bridge Street in Alexandria from Main Street (then A82) to A811 (now A813); this became part of a rerouted A82 and the road was reassigned to the old route of the A82; the section from the A82 to Bridge Street became part of the B857 when the A82 was rerouted onto the bypass.
A813	Dumbarton	Balloch	Swapped with the A811 when the A82 bypass was built, and also replaced the old route of the A82 (this section was originally also part of the A811) south of Bridge Street; formerly continued north to Balloch Road.
A814	Glasgow	Arrochar	Incorporates the Clydeside Expressway in Glasgow
A815	Cairndow	Toward	Is the main road through the Cowal peninsula, goes through Dunoon and down the Firth of Clyde coast to Toward Point.
A816	Lochgilphead	Oban	Planned to be replaced by the A85 in the 1935 renumbering, but this never happened. The southern section along Bishopton Road, Oban Road, and Argyll Street was formerly part of the A817.
A817	Loch Lomondside	Garelochhead	Designated 1995, but built in 1987 to connect the Clyde submarine bases to the A82. Previously allocated to a road from Poltalloch Street to Bishopton Road in Lochgilphead. Became a portion of the A816 between 1981 and 1995.
A818	Arden	Helensburgh	Created in 2005, replacing the B831 and the southern section of the B832. Originally ran from the A83 in Campbelltown to the pier; now part of the B842.
A819	Inveraray	Lochawe	
A820	Dunblane	Doune	
A821	Braeval (Aberfoyle)	Kilmahog	
A822	Greenloaning	Inver	
A823	Rosyth	Muthill	Section between Inverkeithing and Rosyth has motorway status as the A823(M).
A824	Muirton (Auchterarder)	Aberuthven	
A825	Corran	Ardgour	Corran Ferry; the roads on either side are part of the A861. Number assigned by Highland Council in 2014. First used from A822 to A85 in Crieff. Renumbered as the A822 mainline (not a spur) in 1934; the section along Lodge Street was probably declassified at the same time. Next used on a road from Gourock to Gourock ferry terminal (not shown on a 1976 OS map but does appear on a 1978 version). In 1985, the A8 and A78 were rerouted in the area, creating the A770. The rerouting of the A8 would have put the A825 out of zone, and it was renumbered to A771.
A826	Milton	Aberfeldy	
A827	Ballinluig	Mid Lix	
A828	Connel	Ballachulish	
A829	Unused		Ran from Glen Coe via Kinochlemore to North Ballachulish; became part of the A82 in 1934 when it was rerouted to avoid the ferry across Loch Leven, and then the B863 in 1975 when the A82 was rerouted to the Ballachulish Bridge. One map shows a second A829 on the old route of the A82 from North Ballachulish south to the ferry (now the bridge), but this was likely a misprint for the A828 extension (this section is now part of the A82).
A830	Fort William	Mallaig	
A831	Drumnadrochit	A862 near Wester Balblair	
A832	Cromarty	Near Muir of Ord	
A833	Milton	A862 nearBalchraggan	Formerly the B854 before it was upgraded to Class I status. Previously allocated to a road from Muir of Ord to Cromarty. This became an extension of the A832 in 1935 because the A833 was put out of zone by the A9 extension over the A88.
A834	Dingwall	Contin	
A835	A9 and A832 near Tore	Ledmore	Primary route to Stornoway car ferry at Ullapool
A836	Tain	John o' Groats	
A837	Inveran	Lochinver	
A838	Lairg	Tongue	
A839	Near Golspie	Rosehall	
A840	Unused		Ran from A882 (now A9) in Thurso to the Thurso railway station. Became a portion of the B874 by 1967.
A841	Lochranza	Largymore	On the Isle of Arran. Originally circled around the entire island, but now only the northern and eastern sections still exist (but there may still be signage up); the southern and western sections were declassified in the early 2000s.
A842	Unused		Ran from Brodick to Blackwaterfoot. Downgraded to the B880 in the late 1920s, while the western section became part of the A841, now unclassified.
A843	Unused		Ran from Dippen to A842 (now B880) east of Blackwaterfoot. Became part of the A841 in the late 1920s, and is now unclassified.
A844	Rothesay		
A845	Unused		Ran from Rothesay to Ambrismore. Downgraded to a northern extension of the B881.
A846	Lussagiven	Ardbeg, Islay	
A847	Bridgend	Portnahaven	
A848	Mull	Tobermory	
A849	A848 at Salen	Fionnphort	
A850	Dunvegan Castle	A87	Originally ended at Kyleakin; this is now part of the A87.
A851	Armadale	A87	
A852	Unused		Ran from the A851 at Isleornsay to the pier. Declassified in the 1980s and now the C1246; there was one sign still showing A852 until 2010.
A853	Unused		Ran from Armadale to Ardvasar. Declassified in the 1980s and now part of the C1244; there is still one ADS showing A853.
A854	Unused		Ran from Broadford to Corry Pier. Later declassified, but is now the U5002.
A855	Portree	Uig	
A856	Unused		Ran from A850 in Borve to Uig. Became an extension of the A87 in 1995 when the Skye Bridge was opened.
A857	Stornoway, Isle of Lewis	Port Nis, Isle of Lewis	
A858	Stornoway, Isle of Lewis	Barabhas, Isle of Lewis	via Carloway
A859	Stornoway, Isle of Lewis	Rodel, Isle of Harris	Previously allocated to a road from Callanish to Barvas; this became part of the B896 (and is now part of the A858) at the same time the current A859 was created.
A860	Unused		Ran via the Great Cumbrae Island Circle. Downgraded to the B896.
A861	A830 near Kinlocheil	A830 at Lochailort	direct route along A830 is 14 miles (23 kilometres), this road covers 70 miles (110 kilometres)
A862	Clachnaharry	Cromarty Bridge roundabout nearArdullie	Previously allocated to a road from Inverness to Fort Augustus (now B862); the number was reused on the old route of the A9 when the A9 bypass was opened
A863	Dunvegan	A87	
A864	Unused		Ran from A863 east of Lonmore north to A850, with a spur west to the A863. Downgraded in the mid-1980s and is now the C1245. There is still at least one sign showing A864.
A865	North Uist	Lochboisdale	
A866	Stornoway, Isle of Lewis	Portnaguran, Isle of Lewis	
A867	Clachan na Luib	Sruth Mor	
A868	A859 just outside Tarbert, Isle of Harris	Tarbert car ferry terminal, Isle of Harris	
A869	Unused		Ran from A870 (now B8086) west of Scalasaig to Garvard. Downgraded to Class II status as the B8085 by 1993.
A870	Unused		Ran from Scalasaig to Kiloran on the western side of the Isle of Colonsay. Downgraded to Class II status as the B8086 by 1993.
A871	Unused		Ran from Scalasaig to Kiloran on the eastern side of the Isle of Colonsay. Downgraded to Class II status as the B8087 by 1993.
A872	Dennyloanhead	Stirling	Previously allocated to a road from Corran to Ardgour; this became a spur of the A861, while the actual ferry became the A825 in 2014.
A873	Nyadd	Blairhoyle	
A874	Unused		Was a short road in Balloch along Carrocan road from Miller Road to Balloch Road (became part of the A811 and A813). Previously allocated to another road, but it is unknown where the original road with this number was.
A875	Baptiston near Killearn	Kepculloch near Balfron	
A876	Airth	Kincardine	Previously incorporated the Kincardine Bridge, but now incorporates the Clackmannanshire Bridge. Previously allocated to a road from Glasgow to Bowling (now part of the A82; the old route of the A82 east of Bowling is now part of the A814)
A877	Renfrew (A741 at Town Hall)	Renfrew (A8)	
A878	Old Kilpatrick	Station Road	
A879	Glasgow	A807 near Bardowie	
A880	A815 near Ardbeg	Blairmore, Argyll	
A881	Unused		Ran from Broadford to Elgol. Downgraded to the B8083 between 1988 and 1993.
A882	Wick	Georgemas	Section north of Georgemas became part of the A9. Previously allocated to a road from Wick via John o' Groats to Thurso; this became part of the A9 (now A99) and A836, while the number was reused as a renumbering of the section of the A88 that did not become part of the A9.
A883	Falkirk	Denny	
A884	Achnalea	Lochaline	
A885	Sandbank	Dunoon	Known as the High Road, locally.
A886	Port Bannatyne	Strachur	
A887	Invermoriston	Bun Loyne	
A888	Barra		Road circles around the Isle of Barra
A889	Dalwhinnie	Laggan	
A890	Auchtertyre	Achnasheen	
A891	Strathblane	Auchinreoch	
A892	Unused		Ran from A81 south of Callander to A821 (now Invertrossachs road); originally the B828 before it was upgraded to Class I status. Declassified by 1981; the section south of Gartchonzie Bridge is now a cycle route (NCN 7) while the entire route is now the C114.
A893	Ullapool: A835 junction	Ullapool: Ferry terminal	Ullapool's Shore Street, linking the A835 route from Inverness to the Stornoway ferry terminal
A894	Inchnadamph	Laxford Bridge	
A895	Unused		Ran from Latheron to Georgemas; originally a portion of the B873. Became a portion of a rerouted A9 in 1996.
A896	Strathcarron	Kinlochewe	Previously allocated to a road from A9 (now A99) in Wick to Wick Harbour via Union Street and Bank Row, originally the B874. Became part of the A882, probably in 1934 when the A9 extension put the A896 out of zone, and renumbered to A8002 a few years later.
A897	Helmsdale	Halladale Bridge	
A898	Erskine Bridge	Old Kilpatrick	Previously allocated to another road, but it is unknown where the original road with this number was.
A899	Broxburn	Livingston	

== Four-digit roads ==
Road	From	To	Notes
A8000			Ran from Almondhill to Queensferry as an upgrade of the B800, returned to the B800 in 2009. Previously allocated to another road, but it is unknown where the original road with this number was.
A8001			Ran along St. John's Square in Thurso from the A882 to the A840. Became part of the A882 by 1967 and is now part of the B874.
A8002			Former section of the B874 (and later A896); ran from A9 (now A99) in Wick to Wick Harbour via Union Street and Bank Row. This road was out of zone because it was in zone 9.
A8003	Ballochandrain	Tighnabruaich	
A8004	Checkbar Roundabout (B903/A883)	Bonnybridge	Initially shown as a spur of the A883 on a 1969 map; not shown as the A8004 until the 1970s, likely by 1974 when the A876 was upgraded to the M876. Formerly continued north via what is now the B905 to the A876.
A8005			Ran from Bridge of Orchy to Forest Lodge. Downgraded to the C63 (Old Military Road) sometime after 1988.
A8006			Ran from A803 in Kirkintilloch to B757 and B8048. Extended to the M80 in 2010 and renumbered to A806.
A8010	Airdrie	Airdrie	
A8011	Cumbernauld	Cumbernauld	
A8014	Clydebank	Duntocher	
A8015	Tarbert	East Loch Pier	
A8016	Denny	Denny	Runs from the A872 to the A883. Known as the Denny Eastern Access Road.
A8082	Inshes	Tomnahurich	Inverness Southern Distributor Road; upgrade of the former B8082.

== See also ==
- B roads in Zone 8 of the Great Britain numbering scheme
- List of motorways in the United Kingdom
- Transport in Glasgow#Other Roads
- Transport in Scotland#Road network
