= A9 road (Scotland) =

Major road in Scotland

A9

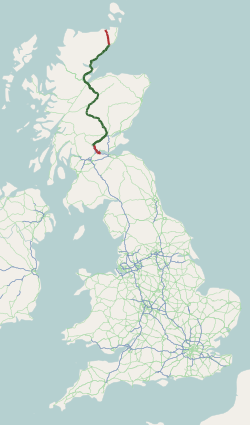

Route information
- Part of E15
- Length: 268.5 mi (432.1 km)

Major junctions
- South end: M9 / A905 in Polmont

- M876 in Larbert; A91 in Bannockburn M90 in Perth; A86 near Kingussie; A96 in Inverness; A82 in Inverness
- North end: Scrabster

Location
- Country: United Kingdom
- Constituent country: Scotland
- Primary destinations: Stirling, Perth, Inverness, Thurso

Road network
- Roads in the United Kingdom; Motorways; A and B road zones

The A9 is a major road in Scotland running from the Falkirk council area in central Scotland to Scrabster Harbour, Thurso in the far north, via Stirling, Bridge of Allan, Perth and Inverness. At 273 miles (439 km), it is the longest road in Scotland and the fifth-longest A-road in the United Kingdom. Historically it was the main road between Edinburgh and John o' Groats, and has been called the spine of Scotland. It is one of the three major north–south trunk routes linking the Central Belt to the Highlands – the others being the A82 and the A90.

The road's origins lie in the military roads building programme of the 18th century, further supplemented by the building of several bridges in later years. The A9 route was formally designated in 1923, and originally ran from Edinburgh to Inverness. The route was soon extended north from Inverness up to John O'Groats. By the 1970s the route was hampered by severe traffic congestion, and an extensive upgrading programme was undertaken on the 138 miles (222 km) section between Bridge of Allan and Inverness. This involved the bypassing of numerous towns and villages on the route, and the building of several new bridges, notably the Kessock Bridge which shortened the route north out of Inverness by 14 miles (23 km).

In the south the road's importance has been eclipsed by:

1. the M90 motorway across the Queensferry Crossing, which now links Edinburgh more directly with Perth, bypassing Stirling and Bridge of Allan as formerly important bridge points, and
2. the M9, which is now the main road between Edinburgh and Stirling/Bridge of Allan.

Between Edinburgh and Falkirk the old A9 route has been reclassified into the A803 and the B9080 amongst others; part of the route between Kirkliston and Maybury no longer exists as the area is now part of Edinburgh Airport. Between Falkirk and Bridge of Allan, the A9 survives as a more or less parallel road to the M9.

The link between the M9 and the A9, by Bridge of Allan, is the Keir Roundabout.

A major project is underway to upgrade the A9 between Perth and Inverness by 2035.

== History ==
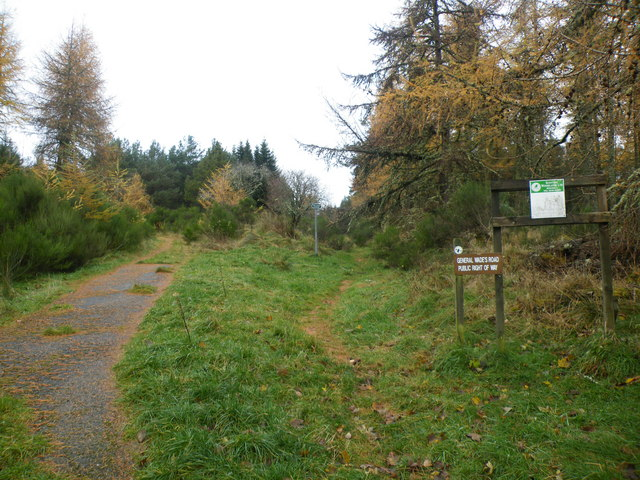
A section of one of General Wade's old military roads, south of Inverness.

The A9's origins lie in the military roads building programme carried out by General Wade in the 18th century to allow deployment of forces in key locations within the Highlands. At this time there was already an existing road between Perth and Dunkeld, and between 1727 and 1730 a roadway was constructed between Dunkeld in Perthshire and Inverness.

However, Wade had still to bridge the River Tay at Aberfeldy. Construction began in 1733 to a design by William Adam. The bridge, named Wade's Bridge, was completed within the year, but Wade wrote "The Bridge of Tay... was a work of great difficulty and also much more expensive than was calculated." At a cost of over £4,000, the bridge became the most expensive item on Wade's road building programme. For most of its length between Perth and Inverness, the route was identical to the A9 prior to the commencement of the major upgrading works in the 1970s.

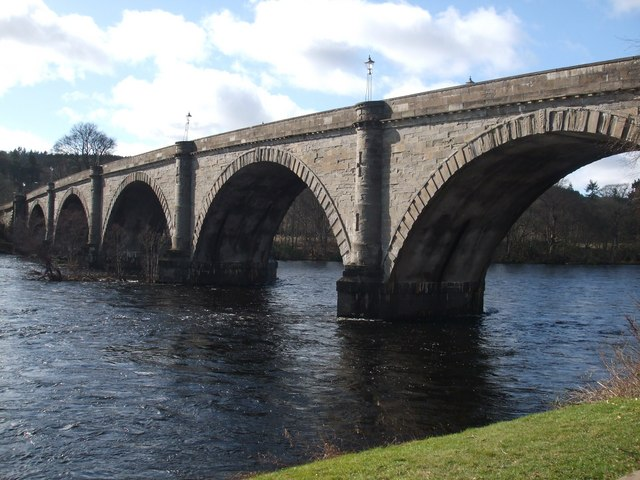
Thomas Telford's Dunkeld Bridge crossing the River Tay

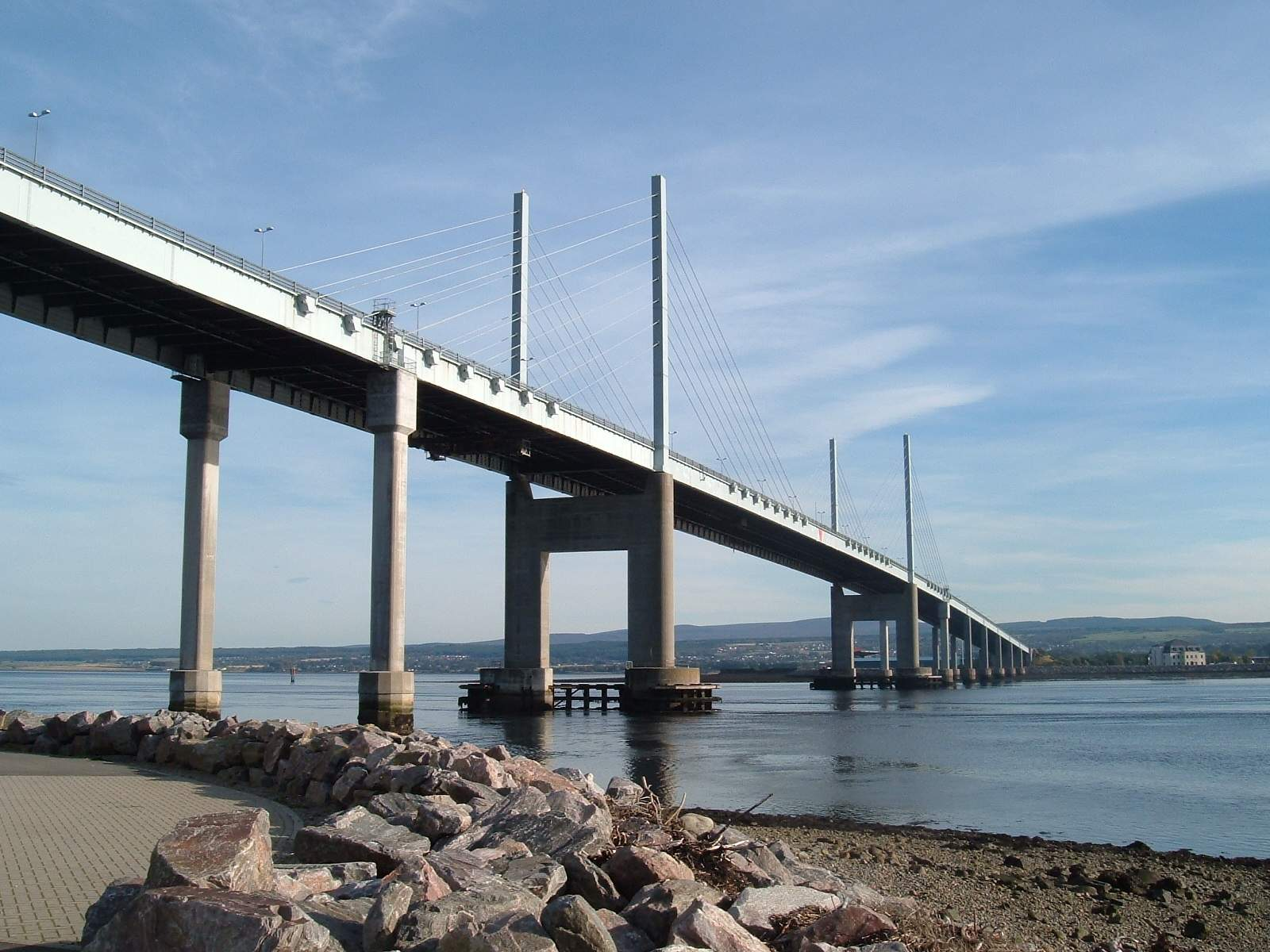
The Kessock Bridge, completed in 1982, which crosses the Moray Firth and shortened the route north out of Inverness by 14 miles (23 km)

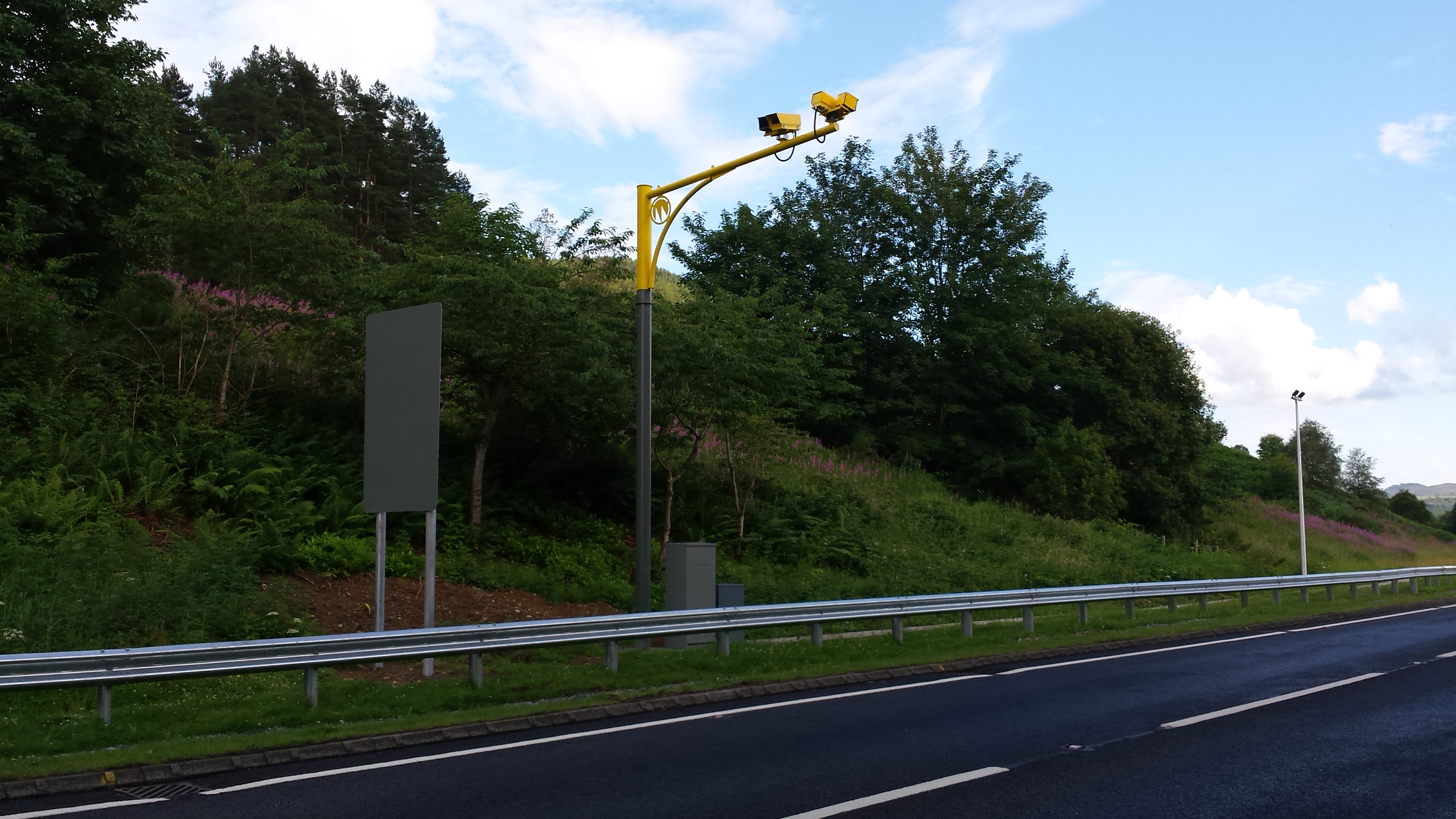
The average speed cameras which became operational on the A9 in late 2014

In 1802, Thomas Telford was requested by the Lords of the Treasury to carry out a survey of the interior of the Scottish Highlands. In his report, he highlighted the inadequacy of the old military roads to meet the requirements of the general population. In particular, he noted the difficulties caused by the absence of bridges over some of the principal rivers. As part of the improvements to the road system that were carried out in the following years, a bridge was built at Dunkeld, designed by Telford. The original cost estimate was £15,000 with costs to be split between the government and the landowner, the 4th Duke of Atholl. However, costs spiralled up to around £40,000. The government refused to increase their financial contribution, so the Duke of Atholl had to finance the extra cost. As a result, tolls were placed on the completed bridge to recoup costs. The realigned road north out of Dunkeld would evolve eventually into the A9, and the bridge carried the bulk of the traffic into the Highlands until the new A9 by-pass was opened in 1977.

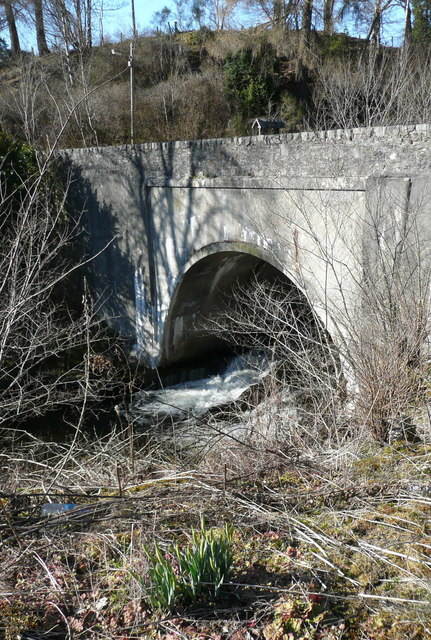
The old A9 (now B8079) as it crosses the Allt Girnaig river at Killiecrankie

The formal scheme of classification of roads in Great Britain (England, Scotland, and Wales) was first published on 1 April 1923. The original route of the designated A9 began in Edinburgh at the Corstorphine junction in the west of the city, branching north off the A8. The route went through Kirkliston and onwards to Polmont and Falkirk. The road then followed the now familiar route to Stirling and then up to Perth and onwards to Inverness, going through numerous villages en route. The original A9 terminated at Inverness, but in the years that followed it was extended to include the roadway all the way up to John O'Groats. By the 1970s, the A9 went north-west out of Inverness in what had originally been classified as the A88, following the Beauly Firth coast westwards through Kirkhill, Beauly and Muir of Ord. Continuing north through Dingwall, the road then began to follow the Cromarty Firth coast, where it followed largely the modern alignment, going through Alness and Tain (both now bypassed). The A9 from here followed west along the south side of the Dornoch Firth coast before reaching Bonar Bridge where the road turned sharply eastwards on the north side of the Dornoch Firth. On reaching the village of Dornoch, the A9 headed north along the coast, going through several villages before reaching the town of Wick. The final stretch continued north along the coast before it finally reached John O'Groats.

== Improvements ==
=== A9 dualling Perth to Inverness ===
Announced in 2011, a project is underway to upgrade the remaining single carriageway sections of the A9 to a dual carriageway between Perth and Inverness. This started in 2015 and was due to be finished in 2025, but delays to the project meant that meeting the original deadline was going to be impossible and has been delayed to 2035. Only 11 out of 80 miles had been converted as of December 2023. In October 2024, preparatory works began on the six mile section between Tomatin and Moy. Full construction work began in early 2025 and due to finish in 2028.

=== Hairpin turn ===
In 2014, Transport Scotland has announced a plan to improve Berriedale Braes' hairpin turn. A fatal collision occurred on that turn in September 2014 due to brake failure from a lorry. One month earlier, a lorry caught fire, causing a 77-mile (123-km) diversion, though no one was hurt. The improved hairpin turn opened to traffic on 21 August 2020.

== Route ==
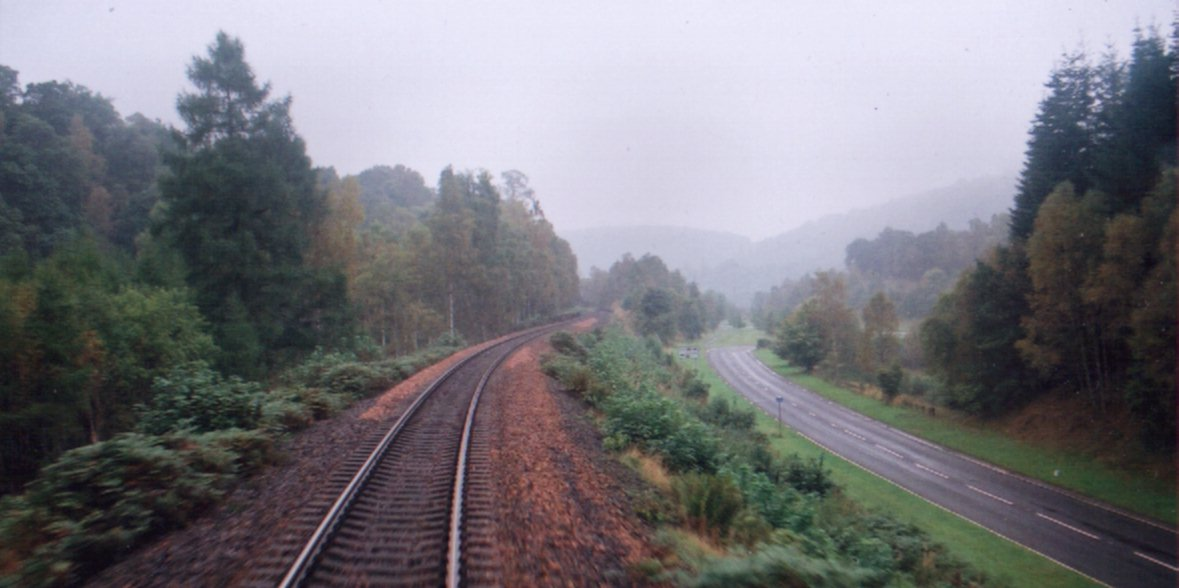
Highland Main Line and A9 highway next to each other in Perthshire, September 2000

The original starting section of the A9 between Edinburgh and Polmont no longer exists as such, having been reclassified over the years in a variety of ways; part of the original route between Kirkliston and Maybury no longer exists at all as the area is now part of Edinburgh Airport. The modern A9 begins at the M9 junction 5 (Cadgers Brae) on the outskirts of Polmont, just east of Falkirk, and continues through Falkirk itself and on though Larbert, Stirling and Bridge of Allan. It then becomes a primary route dual carriageway at the Keir Roundabout, just south of Dunblane, and continues north as a dual carriageway to Perth bypassing Dunblane, Blackford and Auchterarder.

At Broxden Junction on the outskirts of Perth, the A9 meets the M90 motorway which carries traffic from Fife and the Forth Road Bridge. Broxden Junction is one of the busiest and most important road junctions in Scotland, with links to all eight Scottish cities.

The section between Perth and Inverness is often cited as being the most dangerous section of the road, and regularly appears in lists of Scotland's most dangerous roads. This portion of the road is mostly single-carriageway, however there are intermittent short sections of dual carriageway from Perth to Birnam, Pitlochry to Killiecrankie, south of Drumochter Summit, Slochd Summit to Tomatin and south of Inverness as well as shorter three lane overtaking sections to reduce frustration and accidents. All the towns on this section of the route have now been bypassed.

The section from Keir Roundabout to Inverness had average speed cameras installed in 2014 and at the same time the single carriageway speed limit for HGVs was increased from 40 mph (65 km/h) to 50 mph (80 km/h).

In the north, beyond Inverness, the A9 designation has been transferred in response to construction of new bridges across the Moray Firth (the Kessock Bridge), the Cromarty Firth and the Dornoch Firth; and so that the A9 leads not to John o' Groats but to Scrabster Harbour, Thurso, where a government-supported ferry service takes traffic to and from Stromness in Orkney. Therefore, various towns and villages which were on the A9 are now seriously distanced from this trunk road.

Between Perth and Inverness, the A9 forms part of Euroroute E15. Inverness is the northern terminus of this route.

From Falkirk to Bridge of Allan the A9 runs through or near Camelon, Larbert, Torwood, Plean, Bannockburn and Stirling.

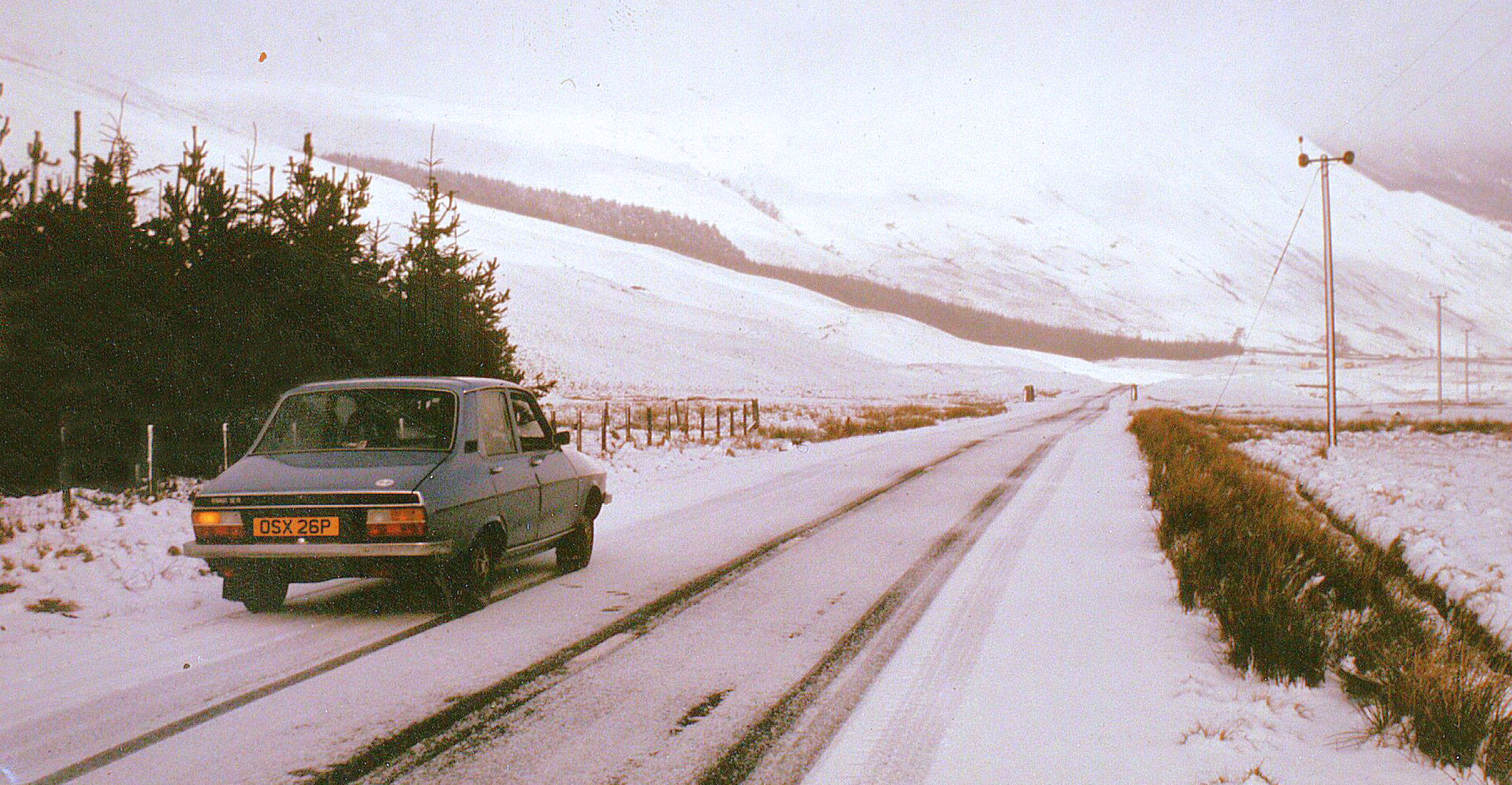
A9 near Dalwhinnie in 1979

From Bridge of Allan to Inverness the A9 runs through or near Lecropt, Dunblane, Blackford, Gleneagles, Auchterarder, Aberuthven, Broxden Junction, Perth, Luncarty, Bankfoot, Birnam, Dunkeld, Ballinluig, Pitlochry, Loch Faskally, Killiecrankie, Blair Atholl, Pass of Drumochter, the Grampian Mountains, Dalwhinnie, Newtonmore, Kingussie, Aviemore, Carrbridge, Tomatin and Moy.

From Inverness the A9 runs across, through or near the Moray Firth, the Black Isle, Tore, Conon Bridge, the Cromarty Firth, Easter Ross, Dingwall, Evanton, Alness, Invergordon, Nigg Bay, Fearn, Tain, the Dornoch Firth, Dornoch, The Mound, Golspie, Dunrobin Castle, Brora, Helmsdale, Badbea, Berriedale, Dunbeath, Latheron, Mybster, Georgemas and Thurso. The road ends at Scrabster Harbour, Thurso.

From the A96 in the Raigmore area of Inverness the A9 has junctions with other classified roads as follows:

- In the Inverness area:
  - The A96 at Raigmore interchange (Ordnance Survey grid reference NH687456).
  - The A82 at Longman roundabout in the Longman area (grid reference NH673467). Just north of this junction the Kessock Bridge (NH664476) carries the A9 over the Moray Firth to the Black Isle.
    - The B865 at Inshes

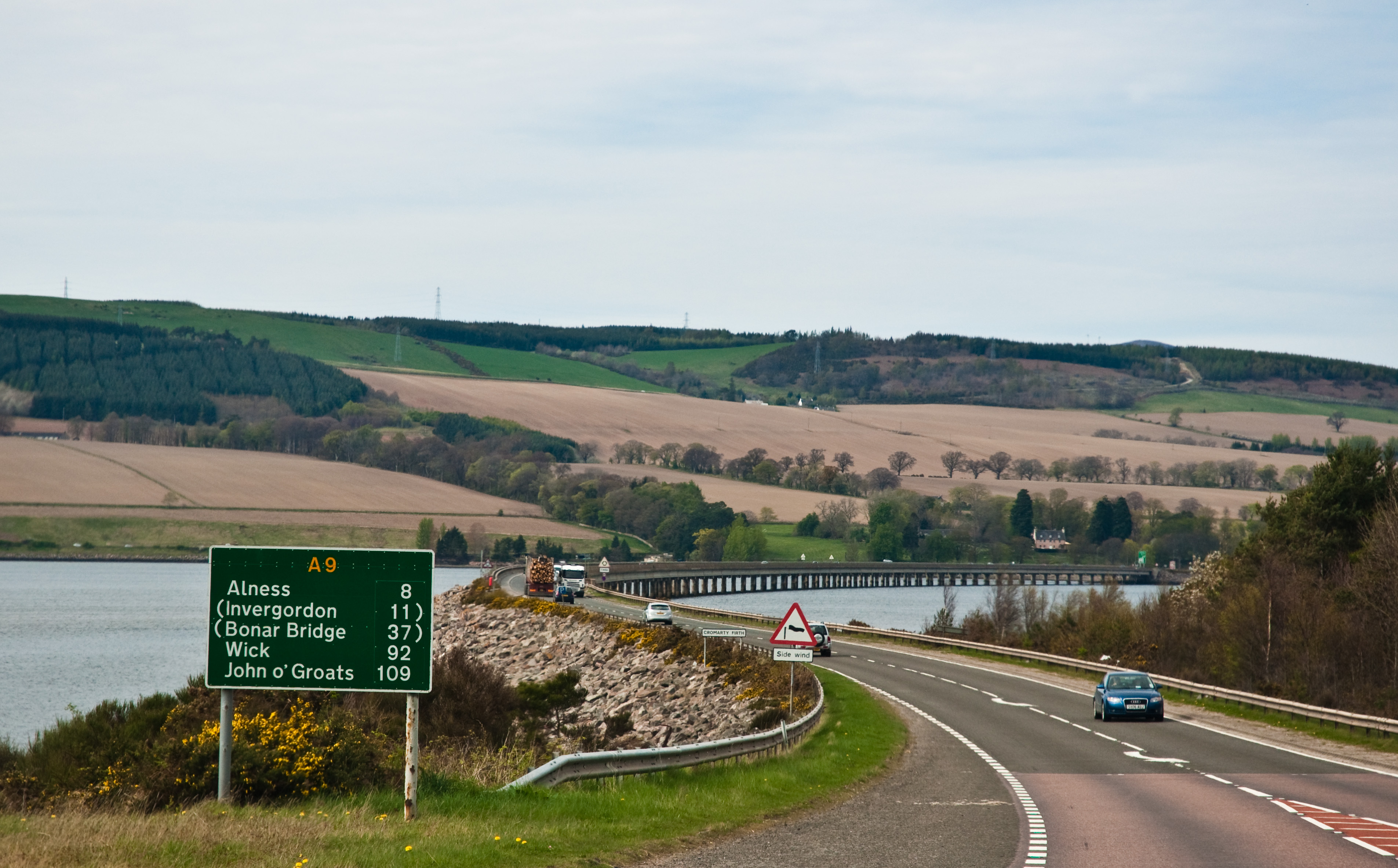
The A9 as it heads north towards the Cromarty Firth causeway, near Dingwall

- On the Black Isle:
  - The B9161 (NH629493).
  - At Tore, near Muir of Ord and Conon Bridge:
    - The A832 and the A835 (NH602524). The A832 and the A835 meet the A9 at the same roundabout, at Tore. The A832 links Muir of Ord with the A9. The A835 links Conon Bridge.
  - The B9169 (NH590569).
  - The B9163 (NH594600). Just north of this junction the A9 bridges the Cromarty Firth (NH589613) to reach Easter Ross.
- In Easter Ross:
  - Near Dingwall:
    - The A862 (NH586622).
  - In the Evanton, Alness, Invergordon area:
    - The B817 (NH604648). The B817 runs through Evanton, Alness and Invergordon. The A9 alignment here is more west–east than south–north. Evanton and Alness are north of the A9. Invergordon is to the south.
    - The B9176 (NH629676). The B9176 road runs to A836 near Bonar Bridge.
    - The B817 (NH665690).
    - The B817 (NH768749).
  - Near Nigg Bay
    - The B9175 (NH793772) – for Nigg Ferry and, in the summer, a vehicle ferry for Cromarty.
  - Near Hill of Fearn:
    - The B9165 (NH797787). Fearn railway station is on the B9165, about one mile (1.6 km) east of the A9.
  - Near Tain:
    - The B9174 (NH785810).
    - The B9174 NH770827).
  - The A836 (NH749843). Just north of this junction the A9 bridges the Dornoch Firth (NH747859).

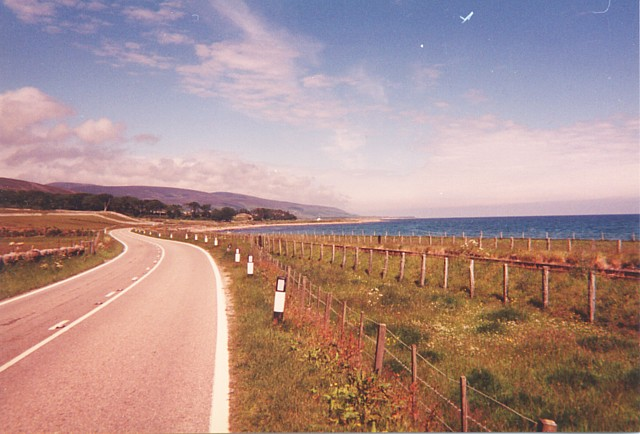
The A9 north of Brora

- In Sutherland:
  - The A949 (NH751895). Skibo Castle is on the A949 which is the 3rd and final junction that runs through to Bonar Bridge
  - Near Dornoch:
    - The A949 (NH768905).
    - The B9168 (NH781927).
  - At The Mound, near Rogart:
    - The A839 (NH777983). Rogart railway station is on the A839. From the Mound the A9 runs through or past Golspie (NC833000), Dunrobin Castle (NC849012) and Brora (NC906040) before meeting another classified road, in Helmsdale.
  - In Helmsdale:
    - The A897 (ND028153). From Helmsdale the A9 runs through Berriedale (ND118226) and Dunbeath (ND160297) before meeting another classified road, at Latheron, Caithness.

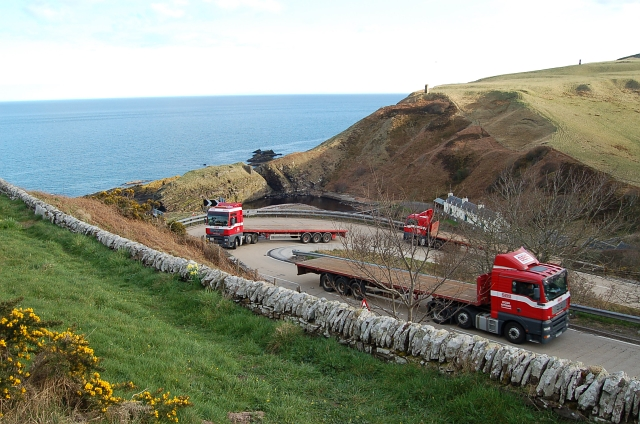
Articulated trucks negotiating the hairpin bends at Berriedale

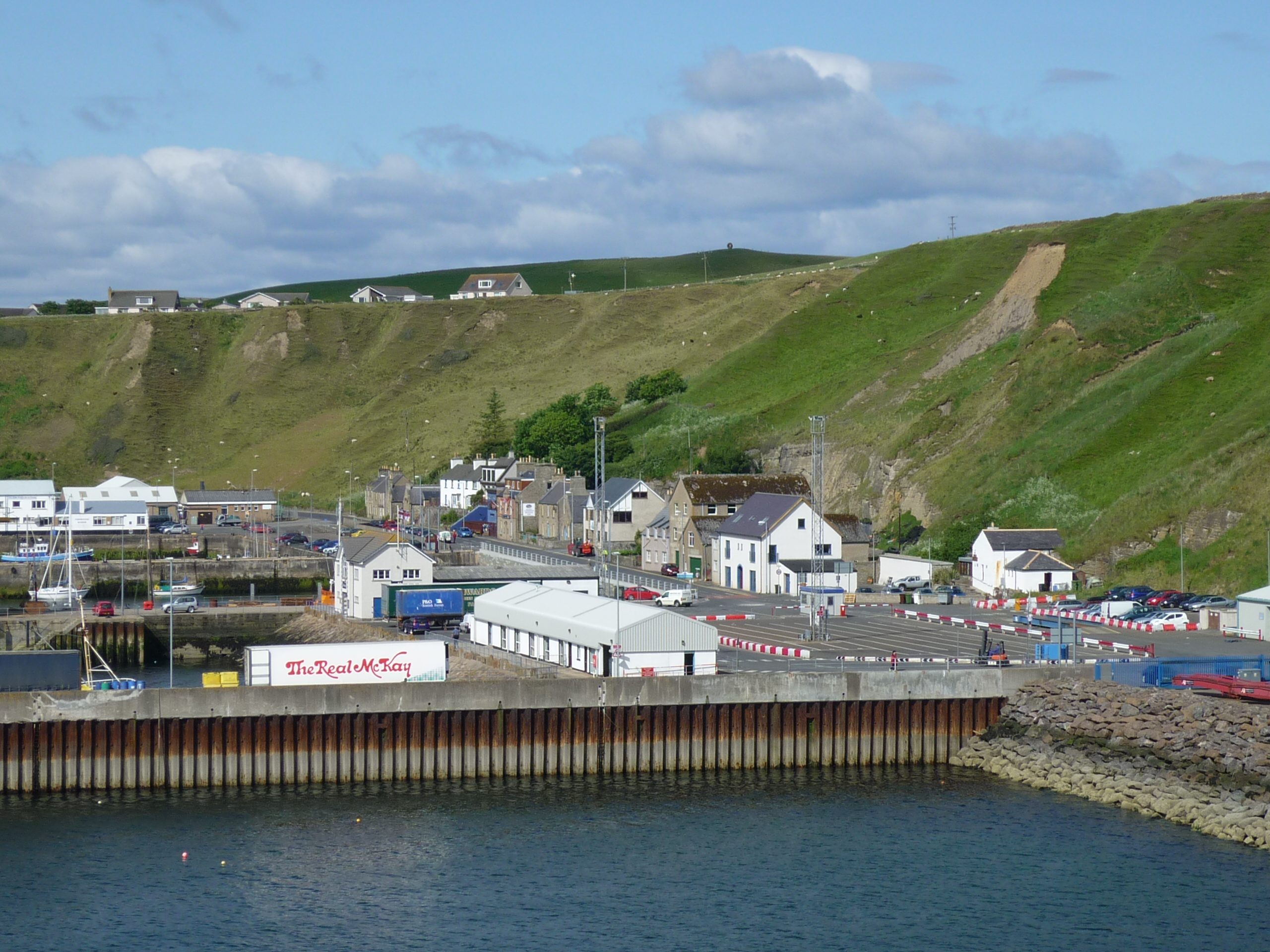
Scrabster harbour, where the A9 now terminates in the north

- In Caithness:
  - At Latheron:
    - The A99 (ND199335).
  - At Mybster:
    - B870 (ND168529).
  - In the Georgemas area:
    - The A882 (ND155601).
    - The B874 (ND152607).
  - In Thurso:
    - The A836 (ND118680).
    - The B874 (ND116682).
    - The A836 (ND107688).

The A9 ends in Thurso, at Scrabster Harbour (ND101704).

== Junction list ==
County	Location	mi	km	Destinations	Notes
Falkirk	Grangemouth—Polmont boundary	0.0	0.0	M9 / A905 (Inchyra Road / Beancross Road) to M876 / A904 – Edinburgh, Linlithgow, Glasgow, Kincardine Bridge, Clackmannanshire Bridge, Stirling, Grangemouth, Bo'ness	Southern terminus; M9 junction 5
Falkirk	Grangemouth—Falkirk boundary	1.8	2.9	A904 (Falkirk Road / Grangemouth Road) to M9 – Grangemouth, Falkirk, Glasgow, Stirling	
Falkirk	Camelon	4.6	7.4	A803 east (Camelon Road) – Falkirk	Southern terminus of A803 concurrency
Falkirk	Camelon	5.0	8.0	A803 west (Glasgow Road) to A883 – Denny, Bonnybridge	Northern terminus of A803 concurrency
Falkirk	Larbert	7.3	11.7	M876 west / A88 east (Bellsdyke Road) to M80 – Glasgow, Stenhousemuir	Western terminus of A88; M876 east junction 2
Falkirk	Larbert town boundary	7.6	12.2	M876 east to M9 – Edinburgh, Grangemouth, Kincardine Bridge, Clackmannanshire Bridge	M876 junction 2
Stirling	Bannockburn	12.1	19.5	A91 to M9 / M90 / A872 – Stirling, Alloa, St Andrews, Denny	To A872 signed northbound only
Stirling	Stirling	13.8	22.2	A872 south (Glasgow Road) / B8051 (Ring Road / Borestone Crescent) to A811 / M9 / M90 – Denny, Erskine Bridge, Cambusbarron, Edinburgh, Glasgow	Northern terminus of A872
Stirling	Stirling	15.0	24.1	A905 south-east / Wellgreen Road / Goosecroft Road to A907 / A91 / M9 / M80 – Alloa, St Andrews	North-western terminus of A905; To M9 and M80 signed southbound only
Stirling	Stirling	15.9	25.6	A84 north / Union Street to M9 / A85 – Perth, Crianlarich	Southern terminus of A84
Stirling	Stirling	16.9	27.2	A907 east (Alloa Road) / Logie Road to A91 – Alloa, St Andrews, Stirling	Stirling signed southbound only; western terminus of A907
Stirling		20.0	32.2	M9 south-east / B824 / B8083 (Stirling Road) – Dunblane, Doune, Stirling, Glasgow, Edinburgh	Stirling, Glasgow, and Edinburgh signed southbound only; north-western terminus of M9; M9 junction 11
Stirling		21.4– 21.9	34.4– 35.2	A820 to A84 – Dunblane, Doune, Callander	Grade-separated junction; To A84 and Callander signed southbound only
Stirling	Dunblane town boundary	23.2	37.3	B8033 – Dunblane, Kinbuck	Grade-separated junction
Perth and Kinross		26.7	43.0	A822 north – Greenloaning, Braco, Muthill, Crieff	Grade-separated junction; northbound exit and southbound entrance; southern terminus of A822
Perth and Kinross		32.8– 33.7	52.8– 54.2	A823 – Crieff, Dunfermline, Gleneagles, Muckhart	Grade-separated junction
Perth and Kinross		34.3	55.2	A824 north-east (Western Road) – Auchterarder, Aberuthven	South-western terminus of A824
Perth and Kinross		38.9	62.6	A824 south-west (Main Road) – Aberuthven, Auchterarder	North-eastern terminus of A824
Perth and Kinross	Perth city boundary	46.7	75.2	M90 south / A93 north – Edinburgh, Perth, Dundee, Aberdeen, Coupar Angus, Blairgowrie, Braemar	Northern terminus of M90; southern terminus of A93; M90 junction 12
Perth and Kinross	Perth	48.0– 48.7	77.2– 78.4	A85 to A82 – Crieff, Perth, Crianlarich	Grade-separated junction; To A82 signed northbound only
Perth and Kinross	Perth	49.2	79.2	A912 south-east (Dunkeld Road) / Ruthvenfield Road – Perth, Ruthvenfield	Ruthvenfield signed northbound only; north-western terminus of A912
Perth and Kinross	Luncarty village boundary	51.1	82.2	B9099 to B8063 – Luncarty, Stanley, Battleby	Grade-separated junction; no southbound exit
Perth and Kinross		53.2	85.6	To B9099 – Tullybelton, Stanley, Luncarty	Grade-separated junction; Luncarty signed southbound only
Perth and Kinross		54.4– 55.1	87.5– 88.7	B867 – Bankfoot	Grade-separated junction
Perth and Kinross		60.8	97.8	A923 east to A984 – Dunkeld, Birnam, Blairgowrie, Coupar Angus	Western terminus of A923
Perth and Kinross		60.9	98.0	A822 south-west (Old Military Road) to A85 – Crieff, Crianlarich	North-eastern terminus of A822
Perth and Kinross	Logierait	68.3– 68.8	109.9– 110.7	A827 west – Ballinluig, Aberfeldy	Grade-separated junction; eastern terminus of A827
Perth and Kinross		71.8	115.6	A924 north-west to A93 – Pitlochry, Braemar	Grade-separated junction; northbound exit and southbound entrance; south-eastern terminus of A924
Perth and Kinross		74.4	119.7	A924 south-east to A93 – Pitlochry, Braemar; B8019 – Killiecrankie, Tummel Bridge, Kinloch Rannoch	A924 and destinations signed southbound only, B8019 and destinations northbound only; Grade-separated junction; north-western terminus of A924
Highland		102.5	165.0	A889 north (General Wade's Military Road) to A89 – Dalwhinnie, Laggan, Spean Bridge, Fort William	Southern terminus of A889
Highland		117.3– 117.5	188.8– 189.1	A86 south-west / B9152 to A82 – Kingussie, Kincraig	Grade-separated junction; B9152 and Kincraig signed northbound only; To A82, Newtonmore, Spean Bridge, and Fort William signed southbound only; north-eastern terminus of A86
Highland		130.4	209.9	A95 north-east to B9152 – Keith, Grantown-on-Spey, Aviemore	Grantown-on-Spey signed northbound only, To B9152 and Aviemore southbound only;south-western terminus of A95
Highland		136.9	220.3	A938 east to B9153 / A95 / A941 – Carrbridge, Boat of Garten, Nethy Bridge, Grantown-on-Spey, Elgin	Only A938 and Carrbridge signed northbound; western terminus of A938
Highland		155.0	249.4	B9177 to B9006 – Milton of Leys, Culloden	Grade-separated junction
Highland		156.6	252.0	B9006 – Culloden, Croy	Grade-separated junction; southbound exit and entrance
Highland	Inverness	156.8	252.3	Hilton, Culduthel, Culcabock, Crown	Grade-separated junction; northbound exit and entrance
Highland	Inverness city boundary	157.2– 157.7	253.0– 253.8	A96 east / B865 – Nairn, Aberdeen, Inverness	Grade-separated junction; B865 and Inverness signed southbound only; western terminus of A96
Highland	Inverness city boundary	158.5	255.1	A82 south (Longman Road) / Stadium Road – Inverness, Fort William	Northern terminus of A82
Highland		158.9– 159.6	255.7– 256.9	Kessock Bridge over Beauly Firth	
Highland		160.7	258.6	North Kessock, Charleston, Kilmuir, Drumsmittal	
Highland	Tore	164.4	264.6	A832 / A835 north-west to A862 – Ullapool, Dingwall, Muir of Ord, Beauly, Fortrose, Cromarty	South-eastern terminus of A832
Highland		169.9– 170.8	273.4– 274.9	Cromarty Bridge over Cromarty Firth	
Highland		171.0	275.2	A862 south to A835 / A834 – Dingwall, Ullapool, Maryburgh, Strathpeffer, Muir of Ord	To A834 / A835 and Muir of Ord signed northbound only; northern terminus of A862
Highland		193.5	311.4	A836 north – Bonar Bridge, Ardgay, Edderton	Southern terminus of A836
Highland		194.3– 194.8	312.7– 313.5	Dornoch Firth Bridge over Dornoch Firth	
Highland		196.9	316.9	A949 west to A836 – Bonar Bridge, Spinningdale, Clashmore, Lairg	Southern terminus of A949 concurrency
Highland		198.1	318.8	A949 east – Dornoch, Embo, Sutherland	Northern terminus of A949 concurrency
Highland		204.3	328.8	A839 west – Lairg, Rogart	Southern terminus of A839
Highland	Helmsdale	224.9	361.9	A897 north (Dunrobin Street) – Melvich	Southern terminus of A897
Highland	Latheron	243.1	391.2	A99 north to A836 – Wick, John o' Groats, Gills Bay	To A836, John o' Groats, and Gills Bay signed northbound only; southern terminus of A99
Highland	Georgemas	260.5	419.2	A882 south-east – Watten, Wick	Watten signed northbound only; north-western terminus of A882
Highland	Thurso	266.2	428.4	A836 north – Castletown, John o' Groats, Gills Bay	Southern terminus of A836 concurrency
Highland	Thurso	267.2	430.0	A836 south – Tongue	Northern terminus of A836 concurrency
Highland	Scrabster	268.5	432.1	Ferry to Stromness	Northern terminus
1.000 mi = 1.609 km; 1.000 km = 0.621 mi: Concurrency terminus
