= A91 road =

Road in Scotland

A91

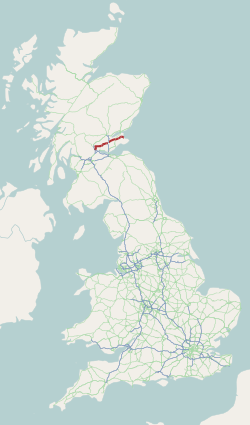

- The A91 near Yetts o' Muckhart

Route information
- Length: 51.1 mi (82.2 km)

Major junctions
- East end: A915 / A917 at St Andrews; 56.3422°N 2.8034°W

- A92 near Cupar; M90 near Milnathort

- West end: M9 / M80 / A827 near Bannockburn; 56.0783°N 3.9192°W

Location
- Country: United Kingdom
- Primary destinations: Stirling, Kinross, St. Andrews

Road network
- Roads in the United Kingdom; Motorways; A and B road zones
← A90	→ A92

The A91 is a major road in Scotland, United Kingdom. It runs from St Andrews to Bannockburn, via Cupar. Along the way, the road runs adjacent to parts of the St. Andrews Old Course and Jubilee golf courses into Guardbridge. Past Guardbridge is Clayton Caravan Park. Further towards Cupar is the Eden Valley & Prestonhall Industrial Estates, home to such businesses as Cupar Garden Centre, Hoggs, Fishers Services and many others. Further down the A91 the road runs adjacent to the major A-road, the A92.

The A91 connects four areas: Stirlingshire, Clackmannanshire, Perthshire and Fife and a section of it is broken up by the M90 motorway near Kinross only to re-emerge and continue bound for Stirling or St Andrews depending on destination.

At Bannockburn the A91 emerges from the M9/M80 Pirnhall junction and skirts the urban area around Stirling and en route to St Andrews passes through Clackmannanshire villages and towns including Alva and Dollar. The road also features a Junction with an unusual layout at Yetts 'O Muckhart.

== Junction list ==
Council area	Location	mi	km	Destinations	Notes
Fife	St Andrews	0.0	0.0	A915 southwest (City Road) / A917 southeast (North Street) to B9131 – Kirkcaldy, Leven, Crail, Anstruther	Eastern terminus; northeastern terminus of A915; northwestern terminus of A917
Fife	Guardbridge	3.7	6.0	A919 north (Main Street) – Dundee, Newport, Leuchars, Tay Bridge	Tay Bridge signed eastbound only; southern terminus of A919
Fife		6.0	9.7	A914 north – Dundee, Balmullo, Newport, Tay Bridge	Tay Bridge signed eastbound only; eastern terminus of A914 concurrency
Fife	Cupar	9.3	15.0	A914 south (Station Road) – Town centre (Crossgate), Kirkcaldy, Glenrothes	Western terminus of A914 concurrency
Fife	Cupar	9.9	15.9	A913 northwest (Balgarvie Road) / Westfield Avenue to M90 – Perth, Newburgh	Southeastern terminus of A913
Fife		14.0	22.5	A92 – Edinburgh, Kirkcaldy, Dundee, Ladybank, Freuchie, Glenrothes, Letham	Edinburgh signed westbound only
Fife		20.0	32.2	A912 south to A92 – Falkland, Strathmiglo, Glenrothes, Kirkcaldy	Eastern terminus of A912 concurrency
Fife	Gateside	22.2	35.7	A912 north to M90 – Perth	Western terminus of A912 concurrency
Perth and Kinross		24.9– 25.1	40.1– 40.4	B996 – Milnathort M90 north – Aberdeen, Dundee, Perth	Junction; westbound exit and eastbound entrance
Perth and Kinross		25.1	40.4	Gap in route	
Perth and Kinross	Milnathort	25.1	40.4	A911 east (New Road) / A922 south (South Street) / Wester Loan – Glenrothes, St Andrews, Kinross, Path of Condie	Western terminus of A911; northern terminus of A922
Perth and Kinross		25.5– 25.7	41.0– 41.4	M90 south – Edinburgh	No access to M90 north or from M90 south; M90 junction 7
Clackmannanshire	Yetts o'Muckhart	32.7– 32.8	52.6– 52.8	A823 / A822 – Crieff, Glendevon, Dunfermline, Rumbling Bridge	To A822 signed eastbound only, Rumbling Bridge westbound only; brief concurrency
Clackmannanshire	Tillicoultry	39.4	63.4	A908 south (Moss Road) – Alloa	Northern terminus of A908
Stirling		46.7	75.2	A907 (Alloa Road) – Alloa, Bridge of Allan, Stirling	Stirling signed eastbound only
Stirling		48.4	77.9	A905 (Kerse Road) to A876 – Fallin, Grangemouth, Kincardine Bridge, Stirling	To A876 signed westbound only
Stirling	Bannockburn	50.3	81.0	A9 – Cowie, Falkirk, Bannockburn	
Stirling		51.1	82.2	M9 – Edinburgh, Perth M80 southeast – Glasgow A872 – Denny, Stirling	Western terminus; M9 junction 9
1.000 mi = 1.609 km; 1.000 km = 0.621 mi: Concurrency terminus
