= Charlestown, Black Isle =

Village in Ross-shire, Scottish Highlands

Coordinates: 57.506°N 4.264°W

Charleston
- Location within the Ross and Cromarty area
- OS grid reference: NH648480
- Council area: Highland
- Country: Scotland
- Sovereign state: United Kingdom
- Postcode district: IV1 3
- Police: Scotland
- Fire: Scottish
- Ambulance: Scottish

Charleston is a village on the north shore of the Beauly Firth, about 1 mile west of the Kessock Bridge, in east Ross-shire, Scottish Highlands, within the Scottish council area of Highland. An artificially created village, it was laid out in 1812 by Sir Charles Mackenzie of Kilcoy.

This is one of several villages and hamlets with the same name in Scotland. The others are Charlestown, Wester Ross; Charlestown, Fife; and Charlestown of Aboyne. The village lies almost directly opposite Inverness across the Beauly Firth. Almost adjacent to the east of Charlestown is North Kessock, which can be accessed along the A9 road or the coast road. The biggest town to the west, about 9 miles away, is Muir of Ord. The village of Tore, about 5 miles to the northeast of Charleston, is accessed by the A9. Directly north is the small village of Munlochy on Munlochy Bay.

== Geography ==
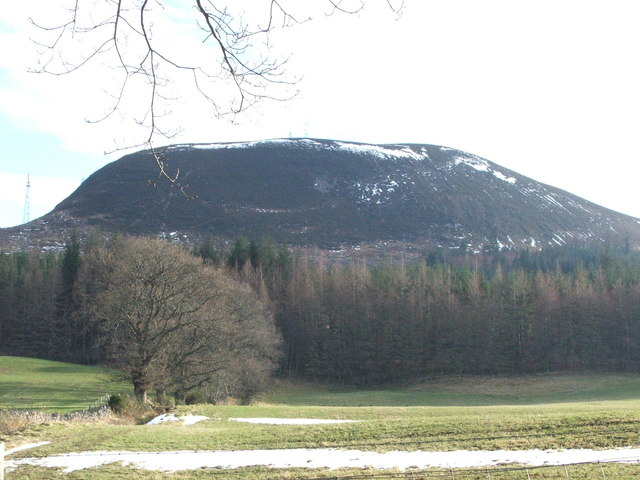
Ord Hill overlooking Charleston, with an Iron Age fort

Charleston lies on the Beauly Firth with a flat plain to the north, that is bounded by Munlochy Bay. To the east is a forested ridge, with Ord Hill at its highest point, which overlooks both Inverness and the Kessock Bridge. The ridge declines in height as it reaches Munlochy Bay at 114 metres. Ord Hill is the site of an Iron Age fort.
