= Hilton, Highland =

Hilton, Highland may refer to:

- Hilton, Inverness
- Hilton of Cadboll (near Tain and Portmahomack), Highland
