= Filter Bunker Raigmore Inverness =

Coordinates: 57.4813°N 4.1991°W

The Filter Bunker Raigmore Inverness is the one remaining of a group of three subterranean bunkers situated around Raigmore in Inverness, Scotland. All three bunkers were constructed around 1940 for use by the Royal Air Force to process RADAR signals from Chain Home masts. The three bunkers in the cluster were Operations, Filter and Command. It is a B listed building because of its historic interest.

== History ==
Historically these bunkers were important in the processing of the Chain Home RADAR signals.

The filter bunker was used by the Civil Defence Corps from 1958 and by the Royal Observer Corps from 1968; it was acquired by Highland Council for use as their emergency centre in 1988.

In 2016 the filter room bunker was put up for sale by the Highland Council. In 2019 it moved into private hands and is now owned by CSP Partnership. Change of use planning permission has been granted to allow part of the building to be developed as a private museum.
