= A835 road =

Road in Scotland

A835

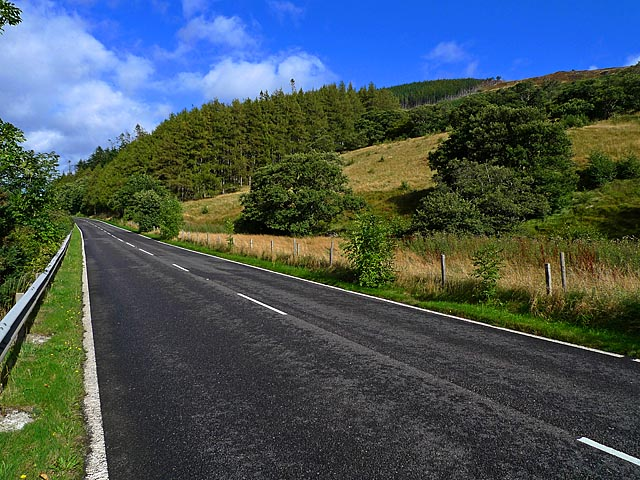

Route information
- Length: 66.2 mi (106.5 km)

Major junctions
- south end: Tore; 57.5405°N 4.3370°W
- A9 A862 A832 A834 A832 A893 A837
- north end: Ledmore; 58.0666°N 4.9724°W

Location
- Country: United Kingdom
- Primary destinations: Inverness, Ullapool, Durness

Road network
- Roads in the United Kingdom; Motorways; A and B road zones

The A835 is a road in the Scottish Highlands linking Inverness to Ullapool and the Far North of Scotland.

== Route ==
The A835 starts at Tore on the Black Isle, seven miles north-west of Inverness at a junction with the A9. The A835 crosses the Black Isle to Conon Bridge, where the A862 crosses, linking Muir of Ord to the west and Fortrose to the east, on the Moray Firth. From here the A835 follows the River Conon upstream through Contin, past Rogie Falls and Loch Garve to Garve Junction, where the A832 forks left through Strath Bran to Achnasheen.

The A835 turns north through the Strathgarve and Garbat Forests, then turns again to the north-west and climbs to the Glascarnoch Dam of Loch Glascarnoch. The road then passes through Dirrie More, a high and wide mountain pass at 279m asl between Sgurr Mòr (Fannichs) and Beinn Dearg, before descending to Braemore Junction where the A832 returns after making a vast circuit around the mountains of Wester Ross and across to the west coast at Gairloch.

The A835 descends from Braemore Junction through Strath More to the head of Loch Broom and then follows the lochside to Ullapool. From here it continues north through Strath Canaird to Ledmore Junction on the A837 road between Lochinver and Bonar Bridge which is where the A835 ends.

The A835 is one of several trunk routes in Scotland where bilingual road signs (in English and Gaelic) are in use.

The A835 formerly commenced at Garve, where the A832 now branches off west. On completion in the 1970s of the new road system from the Kessock Bridge across the Black Isle, including a spur from Tore to cross the R Conon at Maryburgh and continue past Brahan to join the old A832 before Contin, the entire route from Tore to Garve was designated A835, including the former A832 between Contin and Garve. This creates in effect an Inverness-Ullapool trunk road, Ullapool being the ferry terminal for Stornoway. However, it leaves the A832 falling into two widely separated parts, with the resulting illogicality aggravated by the eastern half (Cromarty-Fortrose-Muir of Ord-Contin) intersecting the A9/A835 at Tore.
