= Artafallie =

Coordinates: 57.51°N 04.30°W

Artafallie: Scottish Gaelic: Àirde Fàillidh
- Location within the Ross and Cromarty area
- OS grid reference: NH6249
- Civil parish: Killearnan
- Council area: Highland
- Country: Scotland
- Sovereign state: United Kingdom
- Police: Scotland
- Fire: Scottish
- Ambulance: Scottish

Artafallie (Scottish Gaelic: Àirde Fàillidh) is a hamlet on the Black Isle, in the Highland council area of Scotland. It is about two km (1.2 mi) to the north-west of North Kessock, next to the A9 road.
