= A836 road =

Road in Sutherland, Highland, Scotland

A836

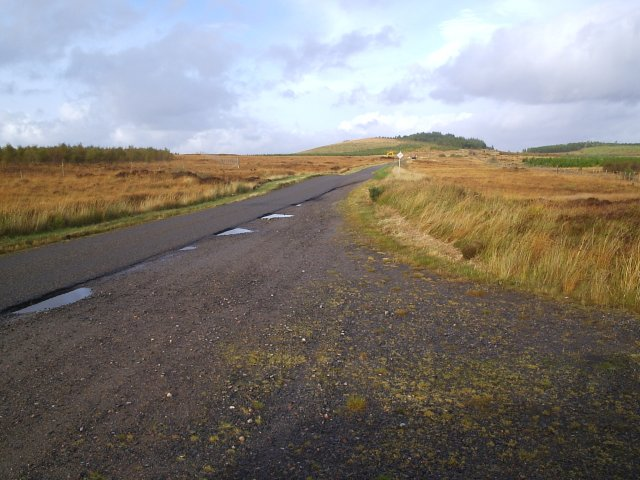
- The A836 in the Scottish Highlands

Route information
- Length: 122 mi (196 km)
- Existed: 1922–present

Major junctions
- South end: Tain; 57.8307°N 4.1067°W
- A9 A949 A837 A839 A838 (twice) A897; A9; A99
- North end: John o' Groats; 58.6386°N 3.0689°W

Location
- Country: United Kingdom
- Primary destinations: Thurso, John o' Groats

Road network
- Roads in the United Kingdom; Motorways; A and B road zones

The A836 is a major road entirely within the Highland area of Scotland. It is 122 miles (196 km) long and runs from Ross and Cromarty to Caithness, with the majority of its length in Sutherland. At 58.648°N where it passes through East Mey, it is the northernmost A-class road in mainland Great Britain.

== Route ==
As it branches from the A9 near Tain it is a Primary route and runs generally north through Bonar Bridge and Lairg this is where it changes from a primary route to a A-classed road. At Tongue the road turns east, following the north coast, passing through Thurso, and eventually ending at John o' Groats, where it meets the A99.

The A836 passes through some of the loneliest and most sparsely populated parts of Britain, and despite having an 'A' classification, is a single track road in many places. It is a hazardous route in winter owing to the narrow road width, sharp gradients and turns, and is particularly not a recommended route for goods and livestock vehicles, unless strictly necessary.

The North Coast 500 scenic route runs along part of the A836.

=== Route history ===
Originally, in 1922, the A836 was designated from Bonar Bridge to Tongue. By 1935 this had been extended south to Alness and east to John o'Groats. Prior to the opening of the Dornoch Firth Bridge in 1991, the section southeast of Bonar Bridge was part of the A9, and the B9176 from Ardchronie to its then-terminus at Alness was designated as A836. The opening of the bridge removed a 26-mile (42 km) detour around the firth for traffic using the A9.
