= List of road junctions in the United Kingdom: E =

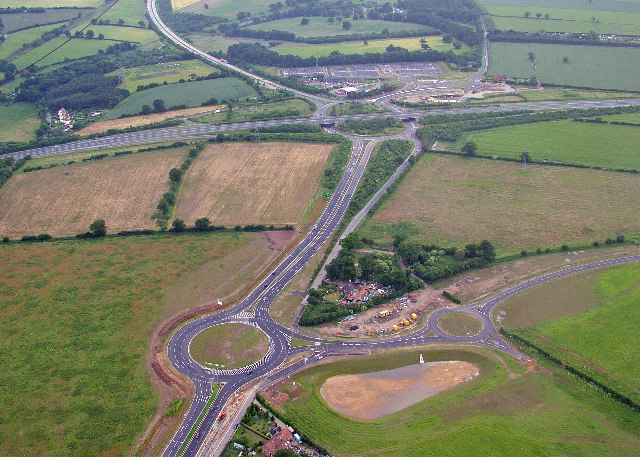
Thickthorn Interchange

This is part of the list of road junctions in the United Kingdom.

Many road junctions are named after pubs. For more information regarding the derivation of pub names see pub names.

== E ==
Junction Name	Type	Location	Roads	Grid Reference	Notes
Eaglestone Roundabout		Eaglestone, Milton Keynes	H7 Chaffron Way; V7 Saxon Street	52°01′55″N 0°44′45″W	
Ealing Common		Ealing, LB Ealing	A406 Gunnersbury Avenue; A4020 Uxbridge Road	51°30′41″N 0°17′31″W	
East Butterleigh Cross		Butterleigh, Mid Devon		50.8674°N 3.4521°W	
East Coombe Cross		Stockleigh Pomeroy, Crediton, Mid Devon		50.8232°N 3.5883°W	
East Leigh Cross		East Leigh, Zeal Monachorum, Mid Devon		50.8326°N 3.8494°W	
East Mere Cross		Uplowman, Tiverton, Devon		50.9324°N 3.4108°W	
East Pidsley Cross	T junction	Kennerleigh. Woolfardisworthy, Mid Devon		50.8331°N 3.6889°W	
East Studham Cross		Yeoford, Mid Devon		50.7693°N 3.7467°W	Named on fingerpost
East Village Cross	Crossroads	East Village, Crediton, Mid Devon		50.8337°N 3.6463°W	
Easterhouse Road Interchange		Glasgow	M8 J9; Easterhouse Road; Springhill Parkway	55°51′42″N 4°06′31″W	
Eastwick Lodge Roundabout	Roundabout	Eastwick, Hertfordshire	A414 Eastwick Road; A414 Fifth Avenue; Eastwick Road (formerly A414)	TL442116	
Echline Junction		South Queensferry, Edinburgh	A90; A8000; A904 Builyeon Road	NT125777	
Edithmead Roundabout		Burnham-on-Sea, Somerset	M5 J22; A38 Bristol Road; B3140	51°14′15″N 2°57′07″W	
Edworth Turn		Edworth, Bedfordshire	A1 London Road (southbound); Sutton Road	52°03′06″N 0°13′46″W	S/B only - see Langford Turn
Eglinton Interchange		Kilwinning, North Ayrshire	A78; A737 Irvine Road; A737 Churchill Drive; B7080	55°38′28″N 4°40′39″W	
Elephant and Castle		Newington, LB Southwark	A3 Newington Causeway; A201 New Kent Road; A3 Newington Butts; A302 St George's Road; A201 London Road	51°29′42″N 0°06′03″W	
Elephant and Castle Junction		Wolverhampton	A449, Stafford Street/Lower Stafford Street; A460, Cannock Road		Named after the demolished Elephant and Castle pub which stood on the north-east side of the junction.
Elfield Roundabout		Bleak Hill, Milton Keynes	H8 (A421) Standing Way; V4 Watling Street	52°00′45″N 0°45′03″W	
Emerson Roundabout		Emerson Valley, Milton Keynes	H8 (A421) Standing Way; V3 Fulmer Street; Shenley Road	52°00′11″N 0°45′50″W	
Enmore Roundabout		Campbell Park, Milton Keynes	Avebury Boulevard; Enmore Gate	52°02′44″N 0°44′29″W	
Esher Common		Oxshott, Surrey	A3 Esher Bypass; A244 Copsem Lane	TQ141624	
Euston Underpass	Diamond Interchange	Euston, LB Camden	A501 Euston Road; A400 Hampstead Road; A400 Tottenham Court Road	51°31′30″N 0°08′18″W	
Exbourne Cross	Crossroads	Exbourne, West Devon	A3072 Hole Hill; B3217 High Street / unnamed	50.7972°N 3.9849°W	Named on road sign
Exe Bridges	Roundabout	Exeter	A377 Bonhay Road; A3015 Frog Street (off only); New Bridge Street; A3015 Western Way (on only); A377 Alphington Street; B3212 Cowick Street; Okehampton Street	50.718°N 3.537°W	Over two bridges over the River Exe
