= List of listed buildings in Killearnan, Highland =

This is a list of listed buildings in the parish of Killearnan in Highland, Scotland.

== List ==
Name	Location	Date Listed	Grid Ref. (Note: Sometimes known as OSGB36, the grid reference (where provided) is based on the British national grid reference system used by the Ordnance Survey. • "Guide to National Grid". Ordnance Survey. • "Get-a-map". Ordnance Survey.)	Geo-coordinates	Notes	LB Number (Note: Historic Environment Scotland assign a unique alphanumeric identifier to each designated site in Scotland, for listed buildings this always begins with "LB", for example "LB12345".)	Image
Kilcoy Castle Gate Piers				57°31′44″N 4°22′43″W	Category B	8008	Upload Photo
Kilcoy Castle				57°31′44″N 4°22′44″W	Category A	8007	Upload Photo
Milton, Killearnan Parish Church (Church Of Scotland)				57°30′47″N 4°22′40″W	Category B	7972	Upload another image See more images
Chapelton Bridge				57°31′08″N 4°21′31″W	Category B	8005	Upload another image See more images
Coulmore				57°30′33″N 4°19′07″W	Category B	8006	Upload Photo
Milton Old Factory				57°30′44″N 4°22′03″W	Category C(S)	7974	Upload Photo
Redcastle				57°30′49″N 4°21′57″W	Category B	7975	Upload another image See more images
Milton Killearnan Parish Church Burial Ground, Dyke And Gate Piers				57°30′47″N 4°22′39″W	Category B	7973	Upload Photo
Redcastle Lodge, Gate Piers And Wall				57°30′49″N 4°22′01″W	Category B	7976	Upload another image
Redcastle Greenhill House				57°31′09″N 4°21′24″W	Category B	7979	Upload Photo
Redcastle Stable Square				57°30′53″N 4°21′47″W	Category B	7977	Upload another image
Kilcoy Mains				57°31′43″N 4°22′47″W	Category C(S)	7971	Upload Photo
Redcastle Steading Oval Building By Stable Square				57°30′55″N 4°21′45″W	Category C(S)	7978	Upload another image

== Key ==
The scheme for classifying buildings in Scotland is:

- Category A: "buildings of national or international importance, either architectural or historic; or fine, little-altered examples of some particular period, style or building type."
- Category B: "buildings of regional or more than local importance; or major examples of some particular period, style or building type, which may have been altered."
- Category C: "buildings of local importance; lesser examples of any period, style, or building type, as originally constructed or moderately altered; and simple traditional buildings which group well with other listed buildings."

In March 2016 there were 47,288 listed buildings in Scotland. Of these, 8% were Category A, and 50% were Category B, with the remaining 42% being Category C.

== See also ==
- List of listed buildings in Highland
