= A949 road =

Road in Scotland

Coordinates: 57.87539°N 4.23673°W

A949

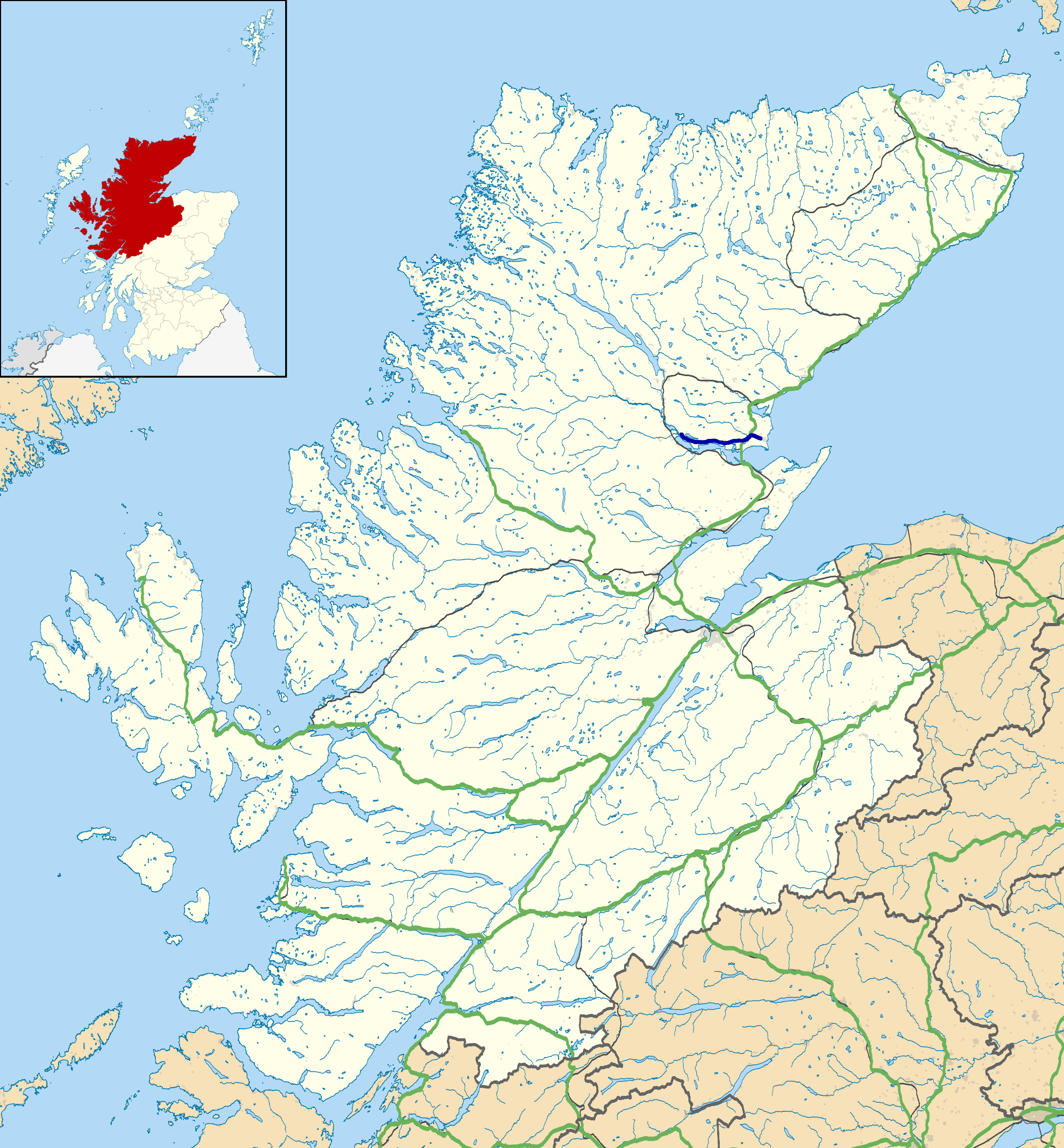

Route information
- Length: 12 mi (19 km)

Major junctions
- North end: Dornoch
- South end: Bonar Bridge

Location
- Country: United Kingdom
- Constituent country: Scotland
- Primary destinations: Bonar Bridge, Dornoch, Skibo Castle, Spinningdale

Road network
- Roads in the United Kingdom; Motorways; A and B road zones

The A949 is a major road in Sutherland, in the Highland area of Scotland. It has staggered junctions with the A9. From the A949 the A9 runs (1) generally north to Thurso and (2) generally south to Tain, Inverness, Perth, Stirling and Falkirk.

From the A9, just north of Tain and the Dornoch Firth, the A949 runs (1) west to the A836 at Bonar Bridge and (2) east to Dornoch. The junctions are about 1 mile (2 km) apart. The section of the A949 between Bonar Bridge and the first junction on the A9 on the north side of the Dornoch Firth was part of the A9 until the opening of the Dornoch Firth Bridge in 1991.

Bonar Bridge is about 10 miles (16 km) west of the A9, at the neck of the Kyle of Sutherland. Dornoch is about 2 miles (3 km) east, at the mouth of the Dornoch Firth.

Within Dornoch the A949 has a junction with the B9168.

The A949 road goes west of the A9 road at a roundabout, merging into Zone 8 of the Great Britain road numbering scheme. It is one of the few Zone 9 roads to go west of the A9.

== Ordnance Survey grid references ==
- A9 junctions:
  - For Bonar Bridge:
    - Ordnance Survey grid reference NH751895
  - For Dornoch:
    - grid reference NH768905
- Bonar Bridge and A836 junction:
  - NH610915
- Dornoch and B9168 junction:
  - NH792898
