= Raigmore Cairn (Stoneyfield Cairn) =

Ancient monument in Scotland

Coordinates: 57.476977°N 4.189900°W

Raigmore Cairn, also known in earlier archaeological literature as Stoneyfield Cairn, Stoneyfield of Raigmore, and Achnaclach, is a multi-period prehistoric monument located in Inverness, Highland, Scotland. It is described as an atypical Clava cairn. This monument gives important evidence of ritual practices in neolithic and bronze age British history in Moray Firth region. Due to urban expansion, the monument was subject to rescue excavation in the early 1970s and subsequently dismantled and relocated from its original setting.

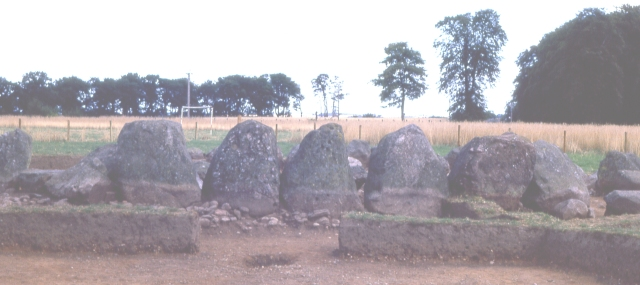
Stoneyfield Cairn at original site

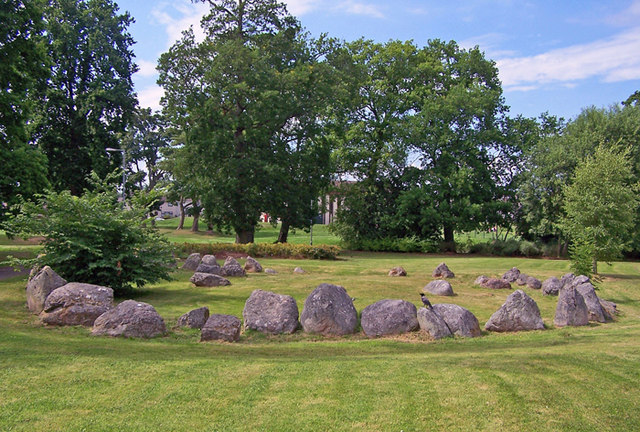
Raigmore Cairn in relocated location

== Location ==
The cairn site was originally located in Stoneyfield along the A9 road. Due to road construction it moved to nearby Raigmore.

Blue point showing original site of Cairn and the Red point showing the relocated site.

== Archeological history ==
Richard Pococke, the Bishop of Meath, recorded a visit to Stoneyfield in 1760, observing two stone circles, one of which was already destroyed. Later, in 1831, J. Anderson, an archaeologist, briefly mentioned this in his surveys.

During the 1970s, A9 road upgrade, to prevent total destruction of the site, prehistorian Derek Simpson led an essential rescue excavation spanning 1972–1973. The findings were published in detail in Proceedings of the Society of Antiquaries of Scotland (1996). Following the excavation, the monument was recognized as sufficiently important to be dismantled and it was relocated as “wholesale” to the present day site behind the Raigmore Community Centre.

Years after its relocation, the cairn was neglected. By the 1990s, the stone ring was overgrown with vegetation, lacking interpretive information, and marked by graffiti. The cairn’s second rescue was carried out coordinated by Archaeology Scotland with help from the local community. The Adopt-a-Monument project also undertook a limited excavation of the current position of the re-erected cairn.

== Description ==
The monument consisted of a kerbed stone ring approximately 18 metres in diameter. Only one stone circle was still intact in the 1970s, at time of its relocation. The second circle mentioned in the earlier archeological records was already damaged at that time.
