= Loch of Toftingall =

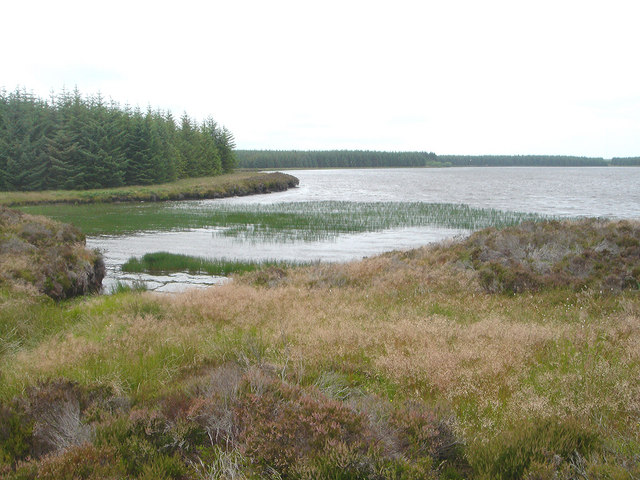
- Loch of Toftingall

- Location in Highland, Scotland
- Location: Highland, Scotland
- Coordinates: 58°27′5.4″N 3°23′19.79″W
- Type: Loch
- Surface area: 50 hectares (120 acres)
- Average depth: 76 metres (249 ft)

Loch of Toftingall is a loch located to the east of Mybster in Highland, Scotland. It has a depth of 76 metres (249 ft) and a surface area of 50 hectares (120 acres).
