= Black Isle Show =

Agricultural Show in Scotland

The Black Isle Show is an agricultural show held in the village of Muir of Ord, in the Highlands of Scotland. It is the largest agricultural show in the Highlands, with farmers from across the region displaying equipment and livestock. It is organised by the Black Isle Farmer's Society, and is held annually on the first Thursday in August.

== History ==
The show was first held in 1836 in Fortrose, and until 1956, moved locations between the farms of society members. It moved to its permanent location, the Mannsfield showground just outside Muir of Ord, in 1957 and has been held there every year except for in 2020 and 2021 when it was cancelled due to the COVID-19 pandemic.

in 2017, the show celebrated its 180th anniversary.

== Attractions ==
The main events of the show include the display and judging of livestock, show jumping, monster truck and stunt displays and sheep shearing competitions. Also present are stalls selling food, crafts and farming equipment, and a bar with live music.

The show ground is used for other events throughout the year, such as the winter scale model show, craft fairs and car boot sales.
