= A86 road =

Road in Scotland

Coordinates: 56.9558°N 4.4790°W

A86

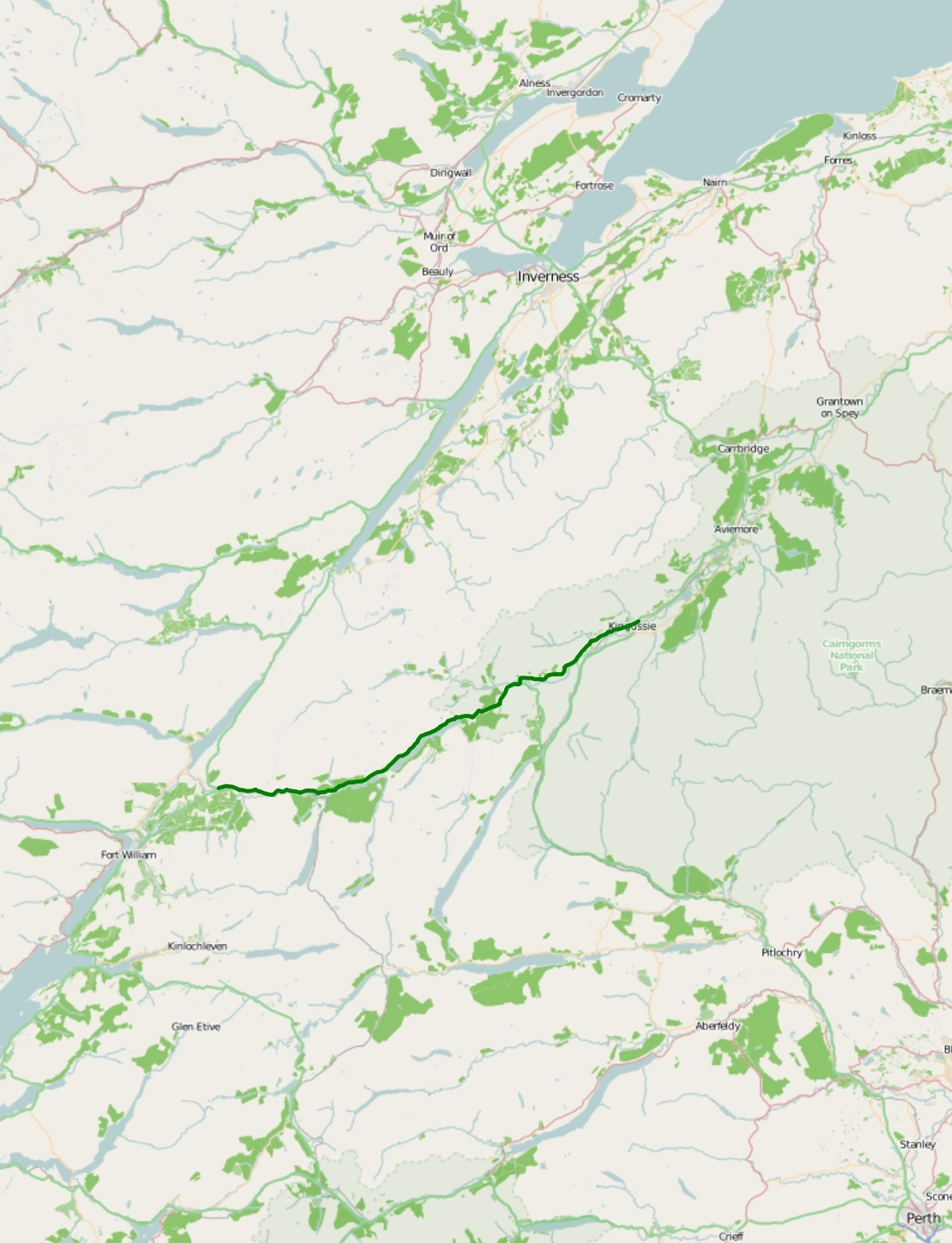

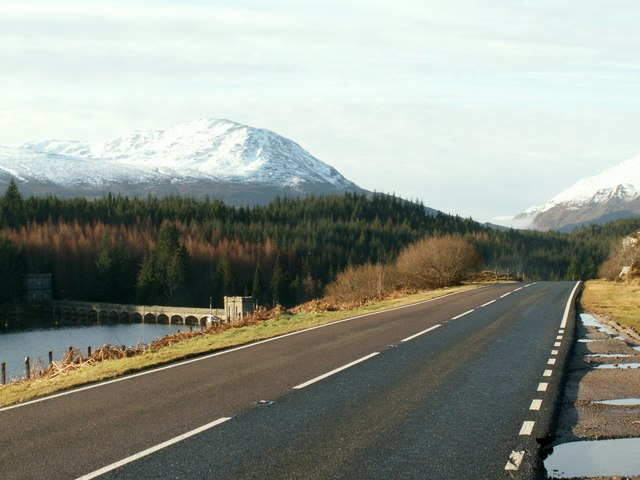
- The A86 at Loch Laggan

Route information
- Length: 40.0 mi (64.4 km)

Major junctions
- West end: A82 in Spean Bridge
- A889 near Laggan
- East end: A9 / B9152 near Kingussie

Location
- Country: United Kingdom
- Constituent country: Scotland
- Council areas: Highland

Road network
- Roads in the United Kingdom; Motorways; A and B road zones
← A85	→ A87

The A86 is a major road in Scotland. It runs from the Great Glen at Spean Bridge to Kingussie and the Cairngorms National Park via Loch Laggan. It is a primary route for its entire length.

The road was built as a parliamentary road by Thomas Telford in 1817 to link Kingussie to Fort William.

The road has a poor safety record, and has been assessed as medium to high risk of a serious or fatal accident by EuroRAP.

== Junction list ==
Council area	Location	mi	km	Destinations	Notes
Highland	Spean Bridge	0.0	0.0	A82 to A87 – Fort William, Inverness, Kyle of Lochalsh	Western terminus
Highland		28.3	45.5	A889 south (General Wade's Military Road) to A9 – Dalwhinnie, Perth	Northern terminus of A889
Highland	Kingussie boundary	39.7– 40.0	63.9– 64.4	A9 – Inverness, Perth; B9152 – Kincraig	Eastern terminus; continues as B9152 beyond A9
1.000 mi = 1.609 km; 1.000 km = 0.621 mi
