= Mybster =

Coordinates: 58.45236°N 3.42525°W

- Location within the Caithness area
- OS grid reference: ND169524
- Council area: Highland
- Lieutenancy area: Caithness
- Country: Scotland
- Sovereign state: United Kingdom
- Post town: Wick
- Postcode district: KW1 5
- Police: Scotland
- Fire: Scottish
- Ambulance: Scottish
- UK Parliament: Caithness, Sutherland and Easter Ross
- Scottish Parliament: Caithness, Sutherland and Ross

Mybster is a small village, in Caithness, Scottish Highlands, and is in the Scottish council area of Highland.

Mybster lies 2 miles (3 km) northwest of the Loch of Toftingall, with the village of Watten lying 2 miles (3 km) directly to the east, and Thurso located 7 miles (11 km) north along the A9 road.
