= Tore, Scotland =

Village in Killearnan, Highland

Coordinates: 57.53863°N 4.33204°W

Tore: Scottish Gaelic: An Todhar
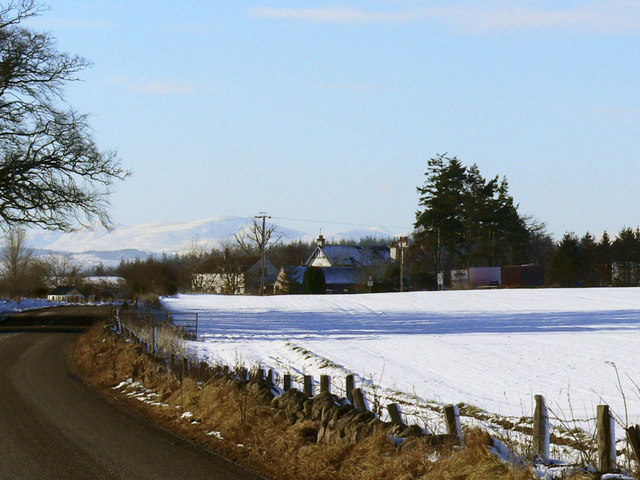

- Location within the Highland council area
- OS grid reference: NH604522
- Civil parish: Killearnan
- Council area: Highland
- Country: Scotland
- Sovereign state: United Kingdom
- Post town: Muir of Ord
- Postcode district: IV6 7
- Dialling code: 01463
- Police: Scotland
- Fire: Scottish
- Ambulance: Scottish
- UK Parliament: Caithness, Sutherland and Easter Ross
- Scottish Parliament: Skye, Lochaber and Badenoch

Tore (Scottish Gaelic: An Todhar) is a small village in the civil parish of Killearnan, on the Black Isle, in Ross and Cromarty, Highland, Scotland.

== Settlements ==
It is located 7 miles (11 km) north of Inverness, next to the A9 road. The Tore roundabout, a major roundabout where the A9 intersects the A832 and the A835, is next to the village. It is split up and therefore set around the roundabout. The school and hall are in their own area, whilst the service station is positioned on the other side. The residents' houses are spread over both halves of the village. Munlochy is situated 4 miles (6.4 km) east of Tore.
