= A839 road =

Road in Scotland

Coordinates: 58.01892°N 4.34269°W

A839

Route information
- Length: 22.6 mi (36.4 km)

Major junctions
- East end: The Mound
- A9 A836 A837
- West end: Rosehall

Location
- Country: United Kingdom
- Constituent country: Scotland

Road network
- Roads in the United Kingdom; Motorways; A and B road zones

The A839 road is in Sutherland, in the Highland area of Scotland. It runs generally west from the A9 at The Mound near Golspie, via Rogart and Lairg, to the A837 at Rosehall. The Mound is a causeway or bridge carrying the A9 across the estuary of the River Fleet. Between The Mound and Lairg the A839 is in Strath Fleet. Rogart and Lairg have railway stations on the Far North Line.
