= A803 road =

Road in Scotland

A803

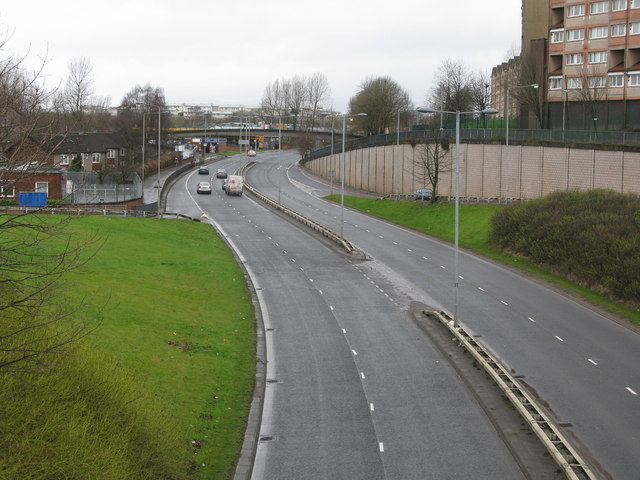
- Looking north from the bridge where Hawthorn Street crosses Springburn Road in the north of Glasgow

Route information
- Length: 33.4 mi (53.8 km)

Major junctions
- west end: Glasgow; 55.8646°N 4.2374°W
- east end: Champany; 55.9928°N 3.5610°W

Location
- Country: United Kingdom
- Constituent country: Scotland

Road network
- Roads in the United Kingdom; Motorways; A and B road zones

The A803 is a road in central Scotland. It runs from Glasgow to Champany Corner, three miles (4.8 km) due north-east of Linlithgow).

== Route ==
Beginning at Townhead in central Glasgow as part of a feeder system for the M8 motorway, forming part of the interchange at Junction 15 north of Glasgow Royal Infirmary, the A803 takes the form of an urban dual carriageway bypass through the Sighthill, Springburn and Colston neighbourhoods of the city, then is a typical primary suburban road running northwards then eastwards through the towns of Bishopbriggs and Kirkintilloch (in East Dunbartonshire), Kilsyth (in North Lanarkshire), Banknock, Haggs – connecting to Junction 7 of the M80 motorway north of Cumbernauld – Bonnybridge, Camelon – where it merges briefly with the A9 – central Falkirk, Laurieston and Polmont, all in Falkirk council area.

After feeding the M9 motorway at Junction 4 which also links to the A801 towards Bathgate, it then runs eastwards through Linlithgow in West Lothian, turns northwards and ends where it meets the A904 road, just north of an eastbound-only connection with Junction 3 of the M9.
