= Champany, Falkirk =

Coordinates: 55.994°N 3.556°W

Champany
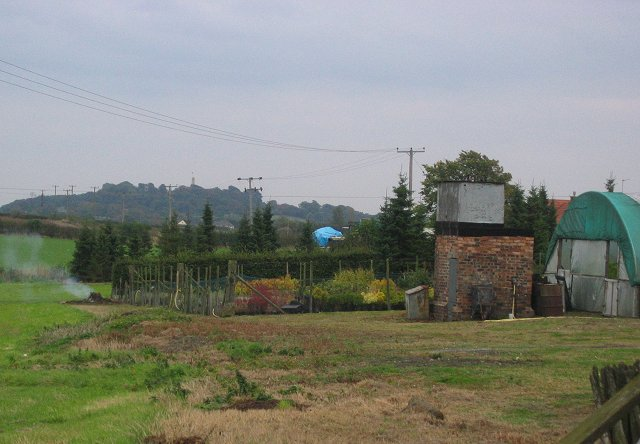
- Nursery, Champany

- Location within the Falkirk council area
- Civil parish: Bo'ness and Carriden
- Council area: Falkirk
- Lieutenancy area: Stirling and Falkirk
- Country: Scotland
- Sovereign state: United Kingdom
- Post town: LINLITHGOW
- Postcode district: EH49
- Dialling code: 01506
- Police: Scotland
- Fire: Scottish
- Ambulance: Scottish
- UK Parliament: Bathgate and Linlithgow
- Scottish Parliament: Falkirk East

Champany is a hamlet in Falkirk, on the junctions of the A904 and A803 roads between Bo'ness and Linlithgow, West Lothian, Scotland.

== Champany Inn ==
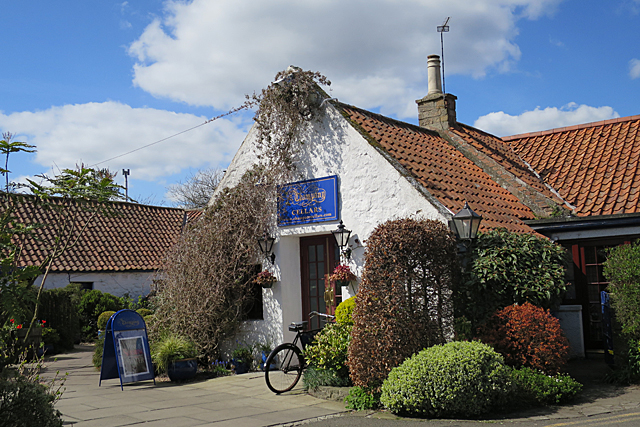
Courtyard of the Champany Inn

The Champany Inn is a restaurant and guesthouse in Champany. The restaurant was opened in 1983 by Clive and Anne Davidson. It was awarded one star in the Michelin Guide in 2008, but lost it in the 2012 guide. The site includes a fine-dining restaurant, a bistro “Chop & Ale House”, sixteen rooms, a Wine Shop and specialist wine cellar. The restaurant won Hotel & Restaurant, Meat Restaurant of the Year, 1999; an AA Wine Award 2002; and Catering in Scotland's Restaurant of the Year, 2013.
