= Dippen, Arran =

Village in United Kingdom

Coordinates: 55.4549°N 5.0945°W

Dippen (Scottish Gaelic: An Dipinn) is a settlement on the Isle of Arran in the Firth of Clyde, Scotland, where there is a prehistoric chambered cairn.
