= East Mey =

Coordinates: 58.64765°N 3.19015°W

- Location within the Caithness area
- OS grid reference: ND310739
- Council area: Highland
- Country: Scotland
- Sovereign state: United Kingdom
- Post town: Mey
- Postcode district: KW14 8
- Police: Scotland
- Fire: Scottish
- Ambulance: Scottish

East Mey is a scattered crofting village in northern Caithness, Scottish Highlands and is in the Scottish council area of Highland.
