= Hilton, Inverness =

Suburb of Inverness, Scotland

Coordinates: 57°27′42″N 4°12′36″W

Hilton (Scottish Gaelic: Baile A' Chnuic) is an area in the city of Inverness, the capital city of the Highlands of Scotland. Known sometimes by its poetic name Balruichk or Baile Cnuic nan Luchd-Saighde (Hilton of the Bowmen or Archers), charters referring to its existence date back to the medieval period. In the medieval era, two separate though interconnected townships existed for tax purposes: Littyl Hiltoun (Baile Beag a' Cnuic) and Meickle Hiltoun (Baile Mòr a' Cnuic). Now a relatively densely populated residential area, Hilton lies only a couple of kilometres from the city centre, has local services, shops, emenities and pubs, with ease of access to the city's ring-road. Deprivation and low income are notably above average in the area relative to the rest of the city. The area retains a strong sense of community with ongoing social enterprises, associations and community organisations. As per its name, the area lies on a historic area of open moorland to the east of the ridges of Drummond, Drumeltienan and Druminden, overlooking the lower-lying strath of Culcabock to the north which is separated by the Druim Cruaidh (Scottish Gaelic: The Hard Ridge) and the lands of Slackbuie, Ballone and Wester Inshes which lie to the west and the south. Historically, the area was bound by a number of freshwater lochs and lochans with Loch Àrdail (The Bishop's Local) to the west, Loch Leothair (the Loch by the Slope) to the south west, Lochan Cille Eòghainn (The Lochan of St. John's Chapel) to the south and Lòn Dhubhthaich (St.Duthac's Pool) to the north west. Of these, only Lòn Dhubhthaich avoided draining in its entirety for agricultural purposes and now forms part of the communal gardens at Stratherrick Park.

== Schools ==
There are two primary schools, Hilton and Cauldeen. After pupils finish their 7th year of education they mostly go to the Inverness Royal Academy, although they have the option of attending other schools, at the discretion of the local authority's Education Department.

== Services in the area ==
In Hilton there are three local shops, a bar/restaurant, a hairdresser, a nail bar, a butcher, two churches, a chip shop, a pharmacy, a Dominos and two cafes.

== Transport ==
On weekdays there are buses into the centre of Inverness every 20 minutes from early morning until late evening, with a less frequent service at weekends.
