= Crown, Inverness =

Area of Inverness, Scotland

Coordinates: 57°28′36″N 4°12′38″W

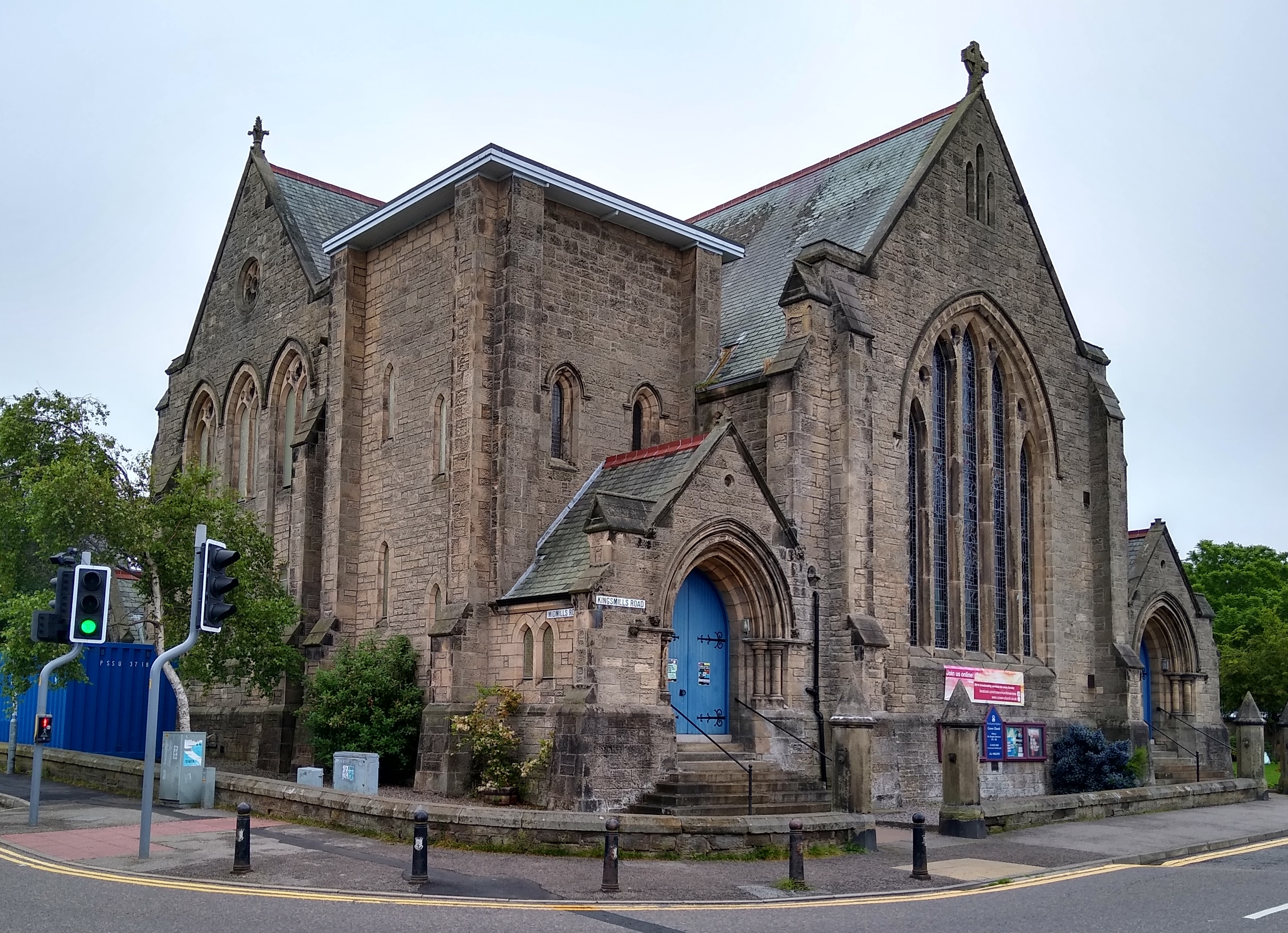
Crown Church

The Crown (from the Scottish Gaelic: A' Chrùn) is an area situated upon the plateau of a hill immediately to the south of the city centre of Inverness. Lying immediately above the city centre of Inverness on a hill, the area is one of the oldest in the city and prior to a period of rapid house-building, consisted of highly fertile strips of land, the produce of which served both the medieval castle and the Parish Kirk, the city's principal high church.

Although one residential area occupying the northern limits of the raised lands south of the city centre today, the Crown comprises three historic communities which developed independent of one another throughout the 1800s: The Hill (Cnoc an t-Sabhail, the Barn Hill) to the west; The Crown (a' Chrunn) to the north and Southside (historically Cnoc Moire or Maryhill) to the south. The Hill and The Crown were historically owned by Clan Chisholm, Clan Cuthbert of Auldcastle and the Church prior to their purchase by Fraser of Boblainy in the 1800s (hence historic Clan Fraser territories such as Beaufort, Lovat, Cawdor and Abertarff appearing in street names) while Southside mainly belonged to the Governor of Inverness Castle or the city itself.

== History ==
The first new town of Inverness with large areas set aside for plots to be sold individually from the early 1800s, the modern day area historically comprised The Hill (Barnhill, Colthill, Balloch Hill, variously); Auldcastlehill, sometimes referred to as 'MacBeth's Hill', part of The Barony of Castlehill and seat of Clan Cuthbert or Clann MhicSheòrsa (Sons of George); The Kirk session lands of Broadstone or Carnmore (Càrn Mòr, Great Cairn); The Porterlands or Knockerloan (historically rendered Crecht na Lon from Cnoc nan Lòn or 'Hill of the Victuals'), today known as Porterfield (Achadh nam Pearachtair) which provided the castle with fruit, vegetables and meat during the medieval era; The lands of Knockpris (Cnoc a' Phris or Thornbush Hill) towards the old Kings Mills and Cotterton (Baile nan Croitear, Towns of the Crofters) located on what is now Mayfield Road and the Commonty of Cudeich, an area open to common crazing by the people of Inverness. A stream called Bùrn Sgùir (Burn of the Washing), anglicised to 'Scour Burn' once flowed from Kingsmills Road through much of the area before descending a steep slope close to modern-day Midmills Road down towards the Mill Burn where its waters emptied.

The area was accessed from the historic centre of the burgh via a number of steep ascending routes: the Bealach pass from the river with hairpin bends arriving at Ardkeen Tower on The Balloch Hill, the Brae of Lochgorm (today called Crown Road from which the Eastgate Shopping Centre carpark is accessed), Stephen's Brae which begins at Eastgate, the Market Brae from the High Street (today the Market Brae Steps but historically a winding brae by which crofters and farmers drove cattle up to the market), the Vennel from Castle Street (today the site of the Raining's Stairs) or MacAndrew's Brae, the steep hill which constitutes the beginning of Midmills Road.

Prior to its establishment as a royal burgh in the 1200s, Inverness centred around the area's Old Castlehill where MacBeth's castle commanded a wide view of the region. The city's medieval walls surrounded much of the area with historic reference to underground tunnels, a large orchard, a holy well and specialist herb and vegetable gardens. Consequently, the Crown is a designated conservation area by the local government, with the area's housing mainly dating back to the Victorian or Edwardian era.

== Modern Day Area ==
Today, the modern residential area is centred around 'The Village' (known in Gaelic as Am Baile), a cluster of shops, small businesses, cafes and pubs which are situated upon a crossroads where five different roads historically leading to important mills, inns and manor houses meet. The Crown consistently scores highly under the Scottish Index of Multiple Deprivations, classifying it as an affluent area with no significant areas of widespread deprivation.

The area is serviced by a number of public amenities, including the Wasps Creative Academy, GP surgeries, Fraser and Walker parks, sports clubs, care homes, sheltered housing for the elderly, a primary school, three churches, a number of charitable organisations, a small prison built during the Victorian era surrounded by high stone walls, an opticians, post office and chemist.

The hospitality sector has a strong presence throughout the area, with a number of small hotels and inns, many bed and breakfast guesthouses and a high density of AirBnB lets. With the city's prison HMP Inverness set to close and move to the much larger Stoneyfield site, a formal process on the future use of the prison's historic buildings and the roughly 1000 square metre grounds is yet to be begin.
