= A893 road =

Road in Scotland

Coordinates: 57.89607°N 5.15763°W

A893

Route information
- Length: 0.3 mi (480 m)

Major junctions
- From: Junction of A835 road (Garve Road), Ullapool
- A835
- To: Ullapool ferry terminal

Location
- Country: United Kingdom
- Primary destinations: Ullapool ferry terminal, Inverness

Road network
- Roads in the United Kingdom; Motorways; A and B road zones

The A893 is a trunk road in the Scottish Highlands, located in the small town of Ullapool. It is approximately one-third of a mile (540 m) in length, and is named Shore Street for its entire diminutive length, along the shore of Loch Broom.

The A835 road arrives in Ullapool from the south-east, bearing the name Garve Road, and at the edge of the town, it turns right, to continue northwards. At this junction, where the A835 loses its trunk-road status, the A893 continues straight on, to the ferry terminal at the far end of Shore Street.

Despite its short length, Shore Street is given trunk road status because it links the A835 trunk road from the Inverness direction to the ferry terminal, from where Caledonian MacBrayne operate a roll-on/roll-off ferry to Stornoway on the Isle of Lewis.
