= Tullybelton =

Hamlet in Perth and Kinross, Scotland

Coordinates: 56.4827°N 3.5684°W

- Location within Perth and Kinross
  - Edinburgh: 39.68 miles
  - London: 371.79 miles
- Council area: Perth and Kinross
- Lieutenancy area: Perth and Kinross
- Country: Scotland
- Sovereign state: United Kingdom
- Post town: PERTH
- Postcode district: PH1
- Dialling code: 01738
- Police: Scotland
- Fire: Scottish
- Ambulance: Scottish
- UK Parliament: Angus and Perthshire Glens
- Scottish Parliament: Perthshire North

Tullybelton is a hamlet located in the Scottish county of Perth and Kinross about 8 miles (13 km) north-northeast of Perth.

Ian Fraser, Baron Fraser of Tullybelton took the name of this hamlet as his title, when he was elevated to being a Lord of Appeal in Ordinary.
