= Raigmore =

Area of Inverness, Scotland

Coordinates: 57.478°N 4.195°W

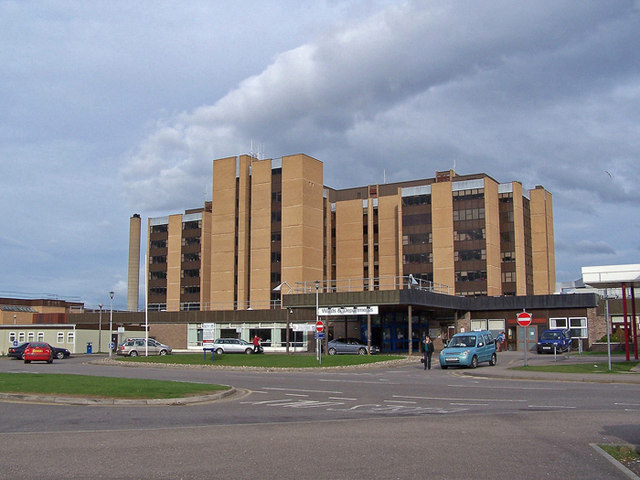
Raigmore Hospital

Raigmore (Gaelic: An Ràthaig Mhòr) is an area of Inverness situated in the east of the city. It is in the Highland council area of Scotland. The name is from the Gaelic for "the large fortified dwelling".

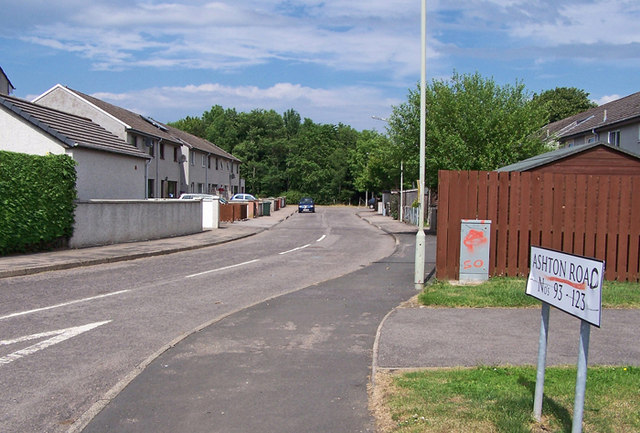
Houses in Raigmore estate

All formerly part of the Raigmore estate, the southern part of Raigmore is now the location of Raigmore Hospital, the main hospital for Inverness and the Highlands. The northern part is now a housing estate, which includes Raigmore Primary School and a community centre.

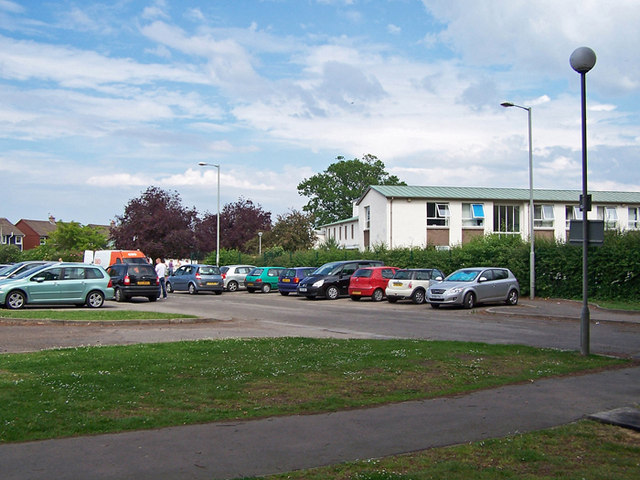
Raigmore Primary School

The A9 road passes by to the east of Raigmore, and connects with the A96 road at the Raigmore Interchange, to the north east of the area. Due to the A9 construction during the 1970s, the Raigmore Cairn (Stoneyfield Cairn) was relocated to its current position behind Raigmore Community Centre.
