= Killearnan =

Civil parish in the Black Isle, Ross and Cromarty, Scotland

Coordinates: 57.513055°N 4.377958°W

Killearnan: Scottish Gaelic: Cill Iùrnain
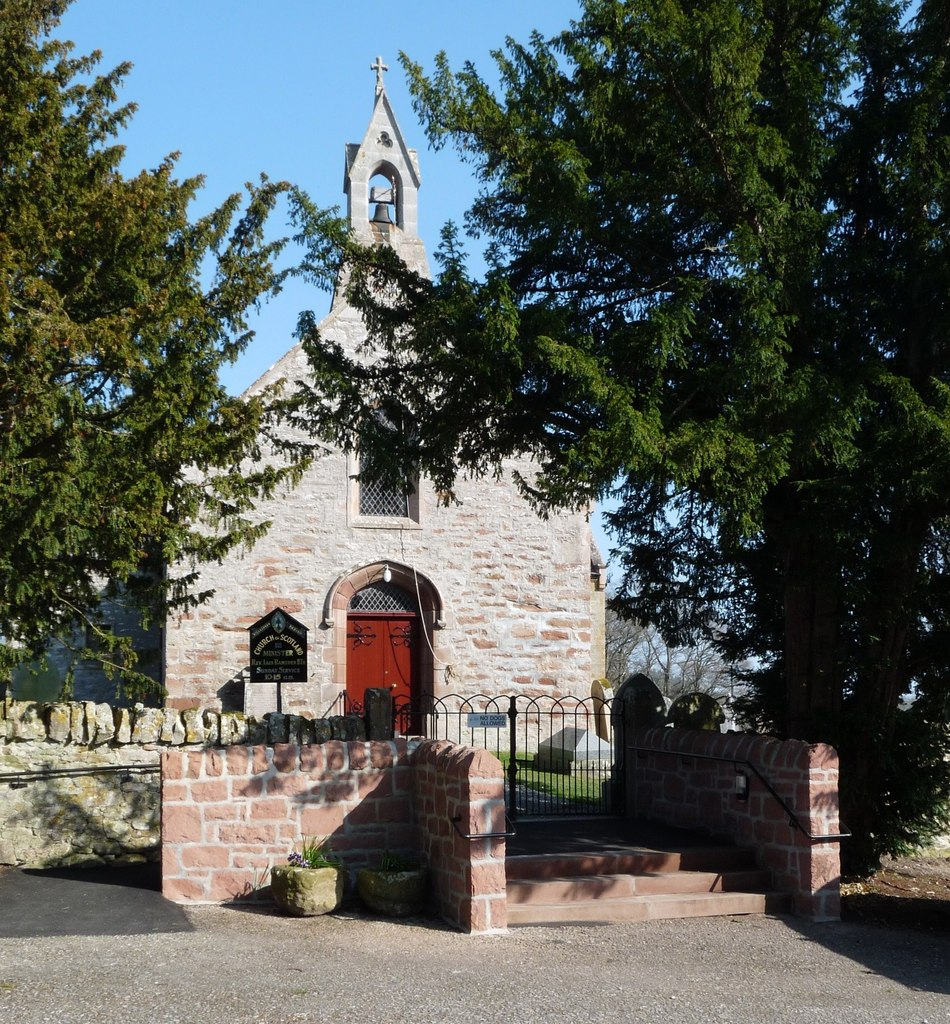
- Killearnan Parish Church

- Location within the Ross and Cromarty area
- Area: 12.1 sq mi (31 km^{2})
- Population: 658 (2011)
  - Density: 54/sq mi (21/km^{2})
- Language: English
- OS grid reference: NH768749
- Civil parish: Killearnan
- Council area: Highland
- Lieutenancy area: Ross and Cromarty
- Country: Scotland
- Sovereign state: United Kingdom
- Post town: Tain
- Postcode district: IV6
- Dialling code: 01862
- Police: Scotland
- Fire: Scottish
- Ambulance: Scottish
- UK Parliament: Caithness, Sutherland and Easter Ross (UK Parliament constituency)
- Scottish Parliament: Caithness, Sutherland and Ross (Scottish Parliament constituency)

Killearnan is a civil parish in the Black Isle peninsula of Ross and Cromarty in the Highland area of Scotland. It is bordered by the parish of Urquhart and Logie Wester on the north, Urray to the west and Knockbain in the east. It borders the Beauly Firth on the south and its church lies on the banks of that firth. The coastline is 5 miles (8.0 kilometres) and has no marked bay or indentation. The civil parish extends about 8 miles (13 kilometres) from east to west.

The name Killearnan means "Iurnan's church" in Gaelic.

The parish is mainly rural with no major villages or towns. The land gently rises to 518 feet (158 metres) at Carnurnan, on the northern border with Urquhart and Logie Wester.

At the 2011 census, the population of the civil parish was 697. 4.9% had some knowledge of Gaelic. A hundred years before, in 1911, 46.7% were Gaelic speaking (and 52.7% in 1881). The area of the parish is 7,735 acres (12.1 mi^{2}; 31.3 km^{2}).

The most significant buildings historically are Redcastle, near the shore of Beauly Firth and Kilcoy Castle in the centre of the parish. Redcastle was built of local Old Red Sandstone on rising ground near the firth. Kilcoy Castle (built early 17th century) was the seat of a barony belonging to the Mackenzie family and has a commanding view of the upper part of the parish.

The parish church, west of Redcastle, is also made of local red sandstone and dates from 1450. It was extensively altered in 1892, when the major part of the manse was built. The parish war memorial is sited at the crossroads in Newton about one mile (1.6 km) to the north-east from the church.

The small village of Tore in the north-east of the parish has a population of 307 (in 2011) and has a school, hall and other public facilities. Prior to 1891 Torre formed a detached part of the parish of Killearnan, separated from the rest by a strip of Knockbain parish, 280 yards (260 metres) wide at the narrowest. In that year the strip was annexed to Killearnan, uniting the two parts of the parish.

The parish council was formed in 1895 with 7 elected members. This was replaced by Avoch District Council in 1930, which was made up of the parishes of Avoch, Knockbain and Killearnan. The District Council had 7 members, 2 of whom were the County Councillors for the area and 5 elected to the District Council from the parishes (Avoch had 2 members, and the other two parishes 1 member each). From 1976, this was superseded by Killearnan Community Council community council covering the area of the civil parish, within Highland Region. The community council has 7 members.

Tore is in the ward of Black Isle of Highland council and the remainder of Killearnan is in the ward of Dingwall and Seaforth

== Settlements ==
- Artafallie
- Tore, Scotland

== Landmarks ==
- Redcastle
- Redcastle railway station
- Kilcoy Castle
