= B800 road =

Road in Scotland

Coordinates: 55.98232°N 3.3962°W

The B800 is a short road in eastern Scotland, connecting the Forth Road Bridge to Kirkliston. It is a two-way single carriageway road.

It was formerly known as the A8000, when it was the main road from the bridge to the M9 motorway and the M8 motorway. The A8000 was under the control of the City of Edinburgh Council, not a Trunk Road under the control of the Scottish Executive. Despite this, it was one of the most important strategic routes in the east of Scotland, carrying traffic from Fife, and further north, to the central Scotland motorway network, and the City of Edinburgh Bypass. During the morning and evening rush hours it was often jammed nose-to-tail for its entire length.

It was replaced in this function in September 2007, when a new section of the M9 which bypasses the B800 was completed. During September 2009 signs amending the numbering of the A8000 to the B800 appeared at the start of the former A8000 and on the northbound slip road of the A90 at the Echline junction.

== Route ==
From the north, the B800 leaves the A9000 (formerly part of the A90) just south of the Forth Road Bridge at Echline Roundabout and heads east to Ferry Muir Roundabout. This busy junction provides access to South Queensferry and a retail park.

From Ferry Muir, the road curves south, back over the A9000 and A90, then continues for about 1.5 miles where it previously met a spur of the M9, at the Humbie roundabout. The roundabout has now gone and the M9 spur, now redesignated as M90, passes overhead.

== Downgrading ==
The Scottish Executive and FETA (Forth Estuary Transport Authority) jointly agreed to fund a replacement of this road. The new road is built along a completely new route, extending the current M9 spur for about 3 km to a new north-facing junction on the A90 near Dalmeny.

Following extensive ground stabilisation work, construction of the M9 Spur Extension started on 17 May 2006 and the new road opened to traffic, initially in a southbound direction only, on 5 September 2007, a month ahead of schedule.

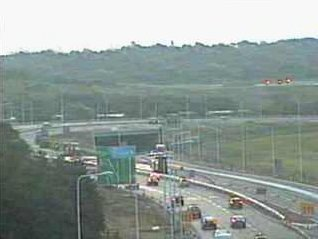
