= A822 road =

Road in Scotland

Coordinates: 56.40331°N 3.80762°W

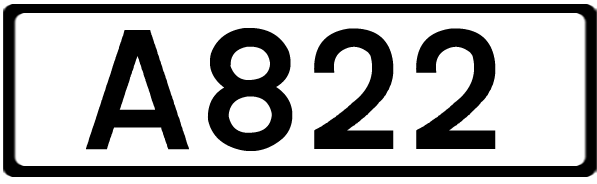
UK road A822

The A822 is a road which runs through Perthshire in Scotland. It runs from the A9 road at Greenloaning, and rejoins the A9 at Dunkeld. It goes through Crieff and intersects the A85 road and the A823 road to Dunfermline.
