= Culcabock =

Former hamlet in Scotland

Coordinates: 57°28′16″N 4°11′55″W

Culcabock (/kʌlˈkæbək/; Scottish Gaelic: Clachan Dhonnchaidh meaning Duncan's Village) is a former hamlet in Highland Council Area which previously lay roughly one mile from the city centre. Culcabock, which was once part of the Barony of Culcabock (previously Kilkavock) now forms a suburb of Inverness, located beside a large golf course and the Fluich Street roundabout.

Miltown of Culcabock, which lies some distance away from the current area and closer to modern areas of Hilton and Drakies at the southern extremity of Culcabock Golf Course, is generally no longer regarded as being part of Culcabock, despite it traditionally forming part of the Barony of Culcabock.
