= A823 road =

Road in Scotland

Coordinates: 56.22336°N 3.63536°W

A823

Major junctions
- North end: South of Crieff
- South end: Dunfermline

Location
- Country: United Kingdom

Road network
- Roads in the United Kingdom; Motorways; A and B road zones

The A823 is a road in Scotland which goes from south of Crieff to Dunfermline. It joins onto the A823(M) and the A822 which runs to Crieff.
