= Muir of Ord =

Coordinates: 57°31′05″N 4°27′35″W

Muir of Ord: Scottish Gaelic: Am Blàr Dubh
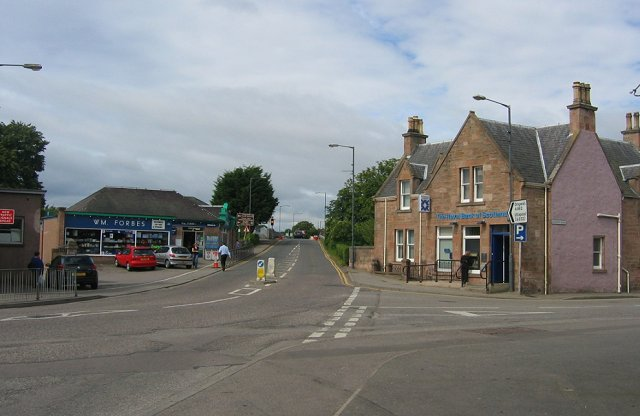
- The centre of the village

- Location within the Ross and Cromarty area
- Population: 2,840 (2020)
- OS grid reference: NH5250
  - Edinburgh: 118 mi (190 km)
  - London: 450 mi (724 km)
- Community council: Muir of Ord
- Council area: Highland
- Lieutenancy area: Inverness
- Country: Scotland
- Sovereign state: United Kingdom
- Post town: Muir of Ord
- Postcode district: IV6
- Dialling code: 01463
- Police: Scotland
- Fire: Scottish
- Ambulance: Scottish
- UK Parliament: Caithness, Sutherland and Easter Ross
- Scottish Parliament: Skye, Lochaber and Badenoch

Muir of Ord (Scottish Gaelic: Am Blàr Dubh) is a village in Easter Ross, in the Highland council area of Scotland. It is situated near the western end of the Black Isle, about 9 miles (14 km) west of the city of Inverness and 5 1/2 miles (9 km) south of Dingwall. The village had a population of 2,840 in 2020 and sits 35 metres (115 ft) above sea level. The Scottish geologist Sir Roderick Murchison was born in the village in 1792.

== History ==
Named Tarradale until 1862, historically access to the village was limited by the natural obstacles of the River Beauly and the River Conon. This changed in 1814 with the construction of the Conon Bridge. Cattle drivers used the new routes to transport livestock and markets were set up in 1820 close to where the village now lies. In 1835 whisky distilling operations were legally granted in the village and by 1885 the Mill of Ord produced 80,000 imperial gallons (360,000 L) per year. The village grew extensively in the 19th century due to the establishment of the distillery and goods industries.

=== Castle Hill Henge ===
Also known as the Muir of Ord Fort, it is a Neolithic or Bronze-Age henge and national monument of Scotland situated 300 yards (270 m) from Muir of Ord railway station. Today it is situated on the green of the Muir of Ord golf course. The henge measures 85 by 65 feet (26 by 20 m) and is surrounded by an 18 ft (5.5 m) wide ditch which is 4 ft (1.2 m) deep. There also are two standing stones about 3/4 mile (1.2 km) away from the henge.

=== Kilchrist Massacre ===
On the outskirts of the village lies the chapel of Kilchrist. The building is held to have been the site of a notorious massacre in 1603 when warriors from Clan MacDonell of Glengarry came to reckon with their enemies the MacKenzies of Kintail and found a congregation of them at prayer. The church was sealed with them still inside and set on fire while the MacDonells' piper circled the building playing 'March Glengarry' to mask the sounds of screaming. In the latter part of the 19th century, the building was restored and is now used as the mausoleum of the MacKenzies of Ord.

=== Modern history ===
In September 2022, the village came to media attention when a local fish and chip shop owner uploaded a Facebook video celebrating the death of Queen Elizabeth II with a bottle of champagne. The owner was then chased away from the village by angry locals who vandalized the chip shop with eggs and tomato ketchup.

== Amenities ==
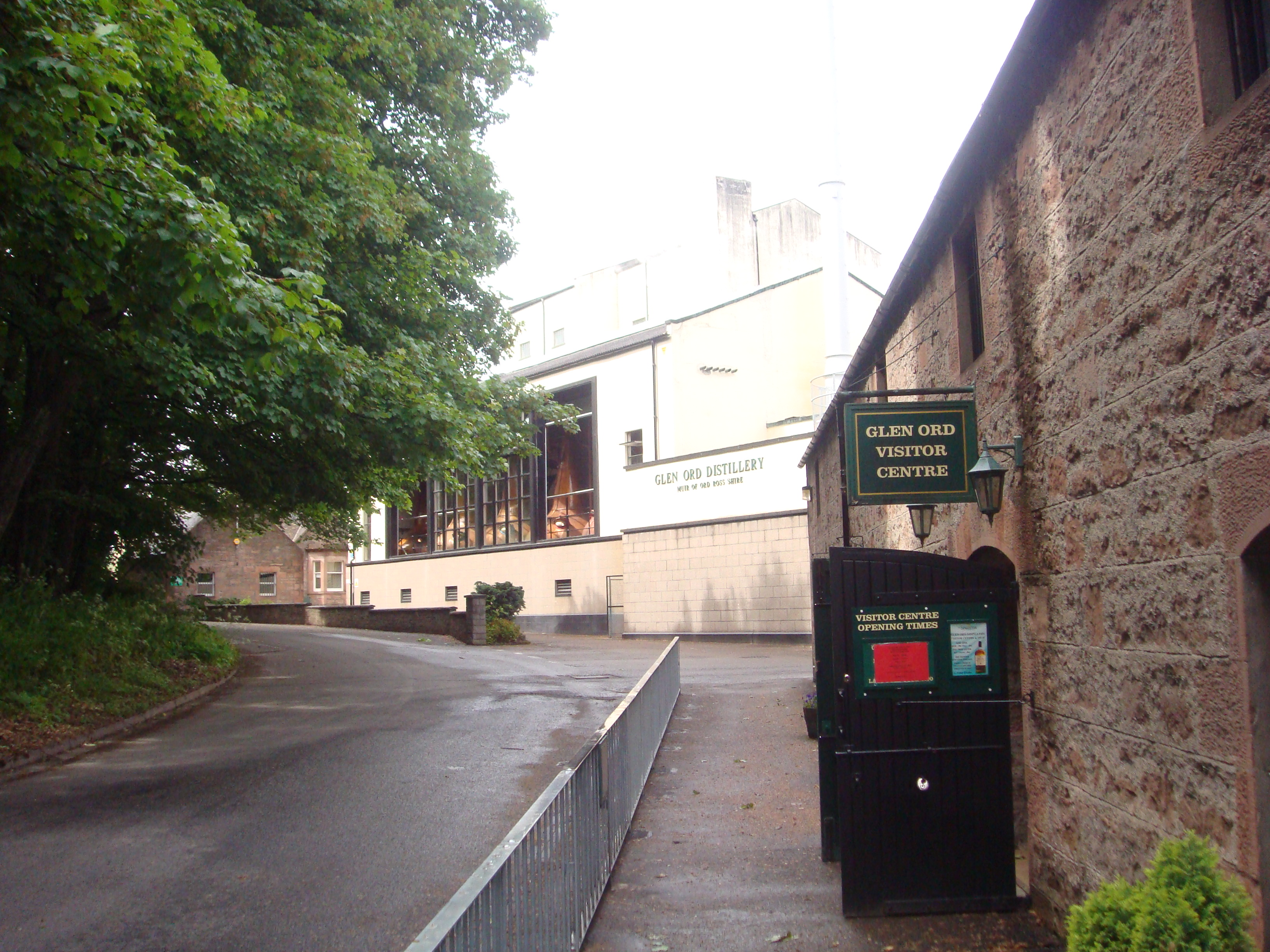
The Glen Ord Distillery Visitor Centre

Just outside of the centre of the village is the Glen Ord distillery, one of the few remaining whisky distilleries on the Black Isle. The Black Isle Show, one of the largest agricultural shows in Scotland, is held every August in a showground near Muir of Ord. The showground is a popular exhibition site thanks to the surrounding flower fields.

Muir of Ord have a local football team, Muir of Ord Rovers, that previously competed in the North Caledonian Football League,before deciding to step down into amateur football in 2014. The club currently play in the Inverness and District Football League Division Two. The club plays at Pavilion Park, behind the bowling club and community pavilion.

The Muir Hub is the newest community building in Muir of Ord. Originally belonging to Tarradale primary school the building had been left unused for numerous years before being refurbished in January 2017. It is now a charity funded venue situated in the heart of the village. The building is multi-functional serving as a cafe, small cinema, conference space and social space. Many local groups meet here and rooms can be rented out for events, clubs, meetings, etc.

== Transport ==
The major route of the A9 road passed through the village until 1982, when it was bypassed by the Kessock Bridge.

The village is served by Muir of Ord railway station, which is on the Kyle of Lochalsh Line and the Far North Line between Dingwall and Inverness.
