= List of elements in place names in the British Isles =

This article lists a number of common elements in place names in the British Isles, their meanings and some examples of their use. The study of place names is called toponymy; for a more detailed examination of this subject in relation to British and Irish place names, refer to Toponymy in the United Kingdom and Ireland.

== List ==
Key to languages: Bry: Brythonic; C: Cumbric; K: Cornish; I: Irish; L: Latin; ME: Middle English; NF: Norman French; OE: Old English (Anglo-Saxon); ON: Old Norse; P: Pictish; S: Scots; SG: Scots Gaelic; W: Welsh

| Term | Origin | Meaning | Example | Position | Comments |
|---|---|---|---|---|---|
| aber | C, W, P, K | mouth (of a river), confluence, a meeting of waters | Aberystwyth, Aberdyfi, Aberdeen, Abergavenny, Aberuthven | prefix | See also Aber and Inver (placename elements); Notably absent from northern England. |
| ac, acc, ock | OE | acorn, or oak tree | Accrington, Acomb, Acton, Matlock | | |
| afon, avon | Bry, C, P, W, SG, K, I | river | River Avon, Avonmouth, Avonwick, Glanyrafon. Strathaven | | W afon is pronounced "AH-von"; several English rivers are named Avon. In Irish the word, spelled abhann, is mainly (though not exclusively) pronounced OW-en. |
| ar, ard | I, SG | high, height | Armagh, Ardglass, Ardgay | | |
| ash | OE | ash tree | Ashby de la Zouch, Ashton-under-Lyne, Ashton-in-Makerfield | | |
| as, ast | OE | east | Ascot, Aston, Astley | prefix | |
| a-, ard-, ath-, at- | I, SG | ford | Amulree, Atholl, Attymass, Athlone, Athy | prefix | anglicised from áth. A- is the usual form in Scotland. |
| auch(en)/(in)-, ach- | I, SG | field | Auchendinny, Auchenshuggle, Auchinairn, Achnasheen, Auchinleck | prefix | anglicised from achadh. Ach- is generally the Highland form, and Auch- the lowland. Auchen- (from Achadh nan ...) means 'field of the ...' |
| auchter- | I, SG | height, top of something | Auchtermuchty, Auchterarder | prefix | anglicised from uachdar |
| axe, exe, usk, esk | Bry | *uɨsk, a Common Brittonic root meaning "abounding in fish" | Exeter, River Axe (Devon), River Exe, River Usk, Axminster, River Esk, Lothian | | cognate of Irish iasc, meaning "fish", and pysg, the plural word for "fish" in Welsh |
| ay, y, ey | OE/ON | island | Ramsay, Westray, Lundy, Selsey, Orkney | suffix (usually) | |
| bal, balla, bally, ball | SG, I | farm, homestead or mouth, approach, ford-mouth | Ballachulish, Balerno, Ballymena, Ballinamallard, Ballater, Balmoral, Ballaghaderreen | prefix | anglicised from baile ("settlement") or sometimes also béal átha ("ford-mouth"; Scottish beul-àtha) or bealach ("way") |
| ban, bannau, bannock, bannog, ben, beinn, beann, binn | I, SG, W | mountain, summit, summits, mountainous | Bannau Brycheiniog, Bannockburn, Benbulbin, Ben Cruachan, Ben Nevis | | |
| bane, bain, baun, baan | SG, I | white | Strabane, Kinbain, Cregganbaun, Cairnbaan | suffix | anglicised from bán (Scottish bàn) |
| beck, bach | OE, ON | stream | Holbeck, Beckinsale, Troutbeck, Beckton, Tooting Bec, Sandbach, Comberbach, Starbeck, Wykebeck | | cf. Ger. Bach |
| beg, begs | SG, I | small | Bunbeg, Carrickbeg, Ardbeg, Killybegs | suffix | Anglicised from beag. |
| bel- | SG, I | mouth, river-mouth | Belhaven, Belmullet, Belfast | prefix | Anglicised from Irish béal, Scottish beul. |
| berg, berry | OE/ON | hill (cf. 'iceberg') | Roseberry Topping, Berkhamsted, Sedbergh | | In Farnborough (OE Fernaberga), berg has converged toward borough, Ger. berg |
| bex | OE | boxwood tree | Bexley, Bexhill-on-Sea | | The OE name of Bexhill-on-Sea was Bexelei, a glade where box grew. |
| blen, blaen | C, W | fell, hill, upland | Blencathra, Blencogo, Blaenau Ffestiniog, Blantyre | | |
| boher | I | road | Bohermore, Boherbue | prefix | Anglicised from bóthar. |
| borris | I, SG | borough, burgage | Borris, Borrisokane, Borrisoleigh, Borrisdale | prefix | Anglicisation of Irish buiríos, Scottish borghas. |
| bost | ON | farm | Leurbost | suffix | cf. ster, (bol)staðr; this form is usually found in the Outer Hebrides. Related to Swedish 'bol' as in Bäckebol and Brandsbol, as well the direct cognate Bålsta (Baalsta). |
| bourne, burn | OE | large brook, large stream, small river | Bournemouth, Bourne, Eastbourne, Ashbourne, Melbourne, Blackburn, Bannockburn | | cf. Ger. -born as in Herborn. The word "burn" is still in common use in Scotland and Northumberland in this sense. |
| boy, bue | I, SG | yellow | Bawnboy, Curraghboy, Boherbue, Buidhe Bheinn, Loch Buidhe | suffix | Anglicisation of Irish buí, Scottish buidhe. |
| brack, breck | I, SG | mottled, speckled | Ballybrack, Mullaghbrack, Dumbreck | suffix | Anglicisation of breac. |
| brad | OE | broad | Bradford, Bradshaw | prefix | |
| bre | C, W, K | hill | Bredon, Carn Brea | prefix | |
| bryn; also brin and bren | C, K, P, W | hill | Bryn, Brynmawr | prefix (usually) | |
| bun | I, SG | river bottom, foot, mouth | Bunbeg, Buncrana, Bundoran | prefix (usually) | |
| bury, borough, brough, burgh | OE | fortified enclosure | Aylesbury, Banbury, Canterbury, Dewsbury, Bury, Pendlebury, Newbury, Shrewsbury, Tewkesbury, Glastonbury, Middlesbrough, Edinburgh, Bamburgh, Peterborough, Knaresborough, Scarborough, Jedburgh, Aldeburgh | suffix (usually) | See also -bury and Borough for further information and other uses. Burgh is primarily Northumbrian and Scots. Cf. Nl. and Ger. Burg, also -borg found in Nordic languages. |
| by, bie | ON | settlement, village | Grimsby, Derby, Whitby, Selby, Crosby, Formby, Kirkby, Helsby, Corby, Wetherby, Lockerbie | suffix (usually) but compare Bicker (the town marsh) | also survives in bylaw and by-election |
| carden, cardden | C, P, W | enclosure | Kincardine, Cardenden, Pluscarden | suffix | |
| caer, car | C, P, W | camp, fortification | Caerdydd, Caerleon, Carlisle, Caerfyrddin | prefix | See also Caer. Brythonic caer from Latin castrum; cf Chester (OE). |
| caher, car-, cr- | I | stone fort, city | Cahir, Cahircon, Carluke, Crail, Carmunnock | prefix | Anglicisation of cathair. Unrelated to Welsh caer. |
| cappa(gh) | I | plot, tillage | Cappagh, Cappamore, Cappawhite | prefix | Anglicisation of ceapach. |
| carn, cairn, carnedd | K, I, SG, W | cairn (pile of stones, esp. as a burial mound) | Carnmoney, Cairnbaan, Carndonagh, Carneddau, Carn Marth | prefix | Anglicisation of Irish carn, Scottish Gaelic càrn, Welsh carnedd. |
| carrow, carry, carhoo, caherna, kirrie | I, SG | quarter | Carrowmore, Kirriemuir, Carrowdore | prefix | Anglicisation of Irish ceathrú, Scottish Gaelic ceathramh. |
| carrig, carrick, craig, creag | I, SG | rock | Carrigaline, Carrick-on-Suir, Creag Meagaidh, Creag Rainich | prefix | Anglicisation of Irish carraig, Scottish Gaelic creag. |
| cashel | I | stone ringfort | Cashel, Cashelore | prefix | Anglicisation of caiseal. |
| caster, chester, cester, (c/x)eter | OE (<L) | camp, fortification (of Roman origin) | Lancaster, Doncaster, Gloucester, Caister, Manchester, Chichester, Worcester, Chester, Exeter, Cirencester, Colchester, Tadcaster, Leicester, Towcester, Winchester | suffix | |
| cheap, chipping | OE | market | Chipping Barnet, Chipping Norton, Chipping Campden, Chepstow, Chipping | | also as part of a street, e.g. Cheapside. Chippenham is from a personal name. |
| clare, clair | I, SG | plain, flat | County Clare, Claregalway, Clairinsh, Loch Clair | prefix | Anglicisation of Irish clár, Scottish Gaelic clàr. |
| clere | Possibly W | Possibly clear or bright | Burghclere, Highclere | | |
| clo(u)(gh) | I, SG | stone | Clogher, Ardclough, Clachtoll, Clonakilty | | Anglicisation of Irish cloch, Scottish Gaelic cloch, clach. |
| clon, clone, cloon | I, SG | meadow | Clondalkin, Clones, Clonbeith Castle | prefix | Anglicisation of cluain. |
| combe, coombe, coom | Bry, I | valley | Barcombe ("Valley of the Britons"), Farncombe, Ilfracombe, Salcombe, Coombe Country Park, The Coombe | | usually pronounced 'coo-m' or 'cum', cognate with cwm. Also appears as Irish com, "hollow." |
| coed | W | wood, forest | Betws-y-coed | | |
| cor, corr | I, SG | small round hill | Cornafulla, Cornaclea | prefix | Anglicisation of Irish corr, Scottish còrr. |
| corry, corrie, curry | I, SG | cirque, corrie | Tubbercurry, Corrie, Coire an t-Sneachda | prefix | Anglicisation of coire (lit. 'cauldron'). |
| cot, cott | OE, W | cottage, small building or derived from Bry/W Coed or Coet meaning a wood | Ascot, Didcot, Draycott in the Clay, Swadlincote | suffix | |
| Craig, crag, creag, crogh, croagh | Bry, SG, I | A jutting rock. | Craigavon, Creag Meagaidh, Pen y Graig, Ard Crags | | This root is common to all the Celtic languages. |
| croft | OE | An enclosed field | Seacroft, Ryecroft, Crofton, Wheatcroft | | The term is also traditionally used in Scotland as a land designation. |
| cross, croes | I, SG, E, W | crossroads | Crossmolina, Crossmaglen, Crossmyloof, Crossmichael, Gerrards Cross, Tŷ Croes | prefix | From English cross, Irish crois, Welsh croes. |
| cul | C, W | narrow | Culcheth | prefix | |
| cul, cool, coul | I, SG | rear, back | Cultra, Coolafancy, Coulport, Culkein | prefix | From Irish cúl, Scottish Gaelic cùl. |
| cul, cool, cole, cuil | I, SG | nook, corner | Coleraine, Cloonacool, Cuil Bay, Culduie | prefix | From Irish cúil, Scottish Gaelic cùil. |
| -cum- | L | with | Salcott-cum-Virley, Cockshutt-cum-Petton, Chorlton-cum-Hardy, Bardsey cum Rigton, Wilsford cum Lake | interfix | Used where two parishes were combined into one. Unrelated to Cumbric cum. |
| curra-, currie, curragh | I, SG | bog, marsh | Currie, Curracloe, The Curragh | prefix | Anglicisation of currach. |
| cwm, cum | W, C | valley | Cwmaman, Cumdivock, Cwmann, Cwmbran, Cwm Head | prefix | cwm in Welsh and cum in Cumbric; borrowed into old English as suffix coombe. |
| dal | SG, I | meadow, low-lying area by river | Dalry, Dalmellington | prefix | Cognate with and probably influenced by P Dol |
| dale | OE/ON | valley OE, allotment OE | Airedale i.e. valley of the River Aire, Rochdale, Weardale, Nidderdale | suffix | Cognate with Tal (Ger.), dalr (ON) |
| dean, den, don | OE - denu | valley (dene) | Croydon, Dean Village, Walkden, Rottingdean and Saltdean, Todmorden | suffix | the geography is often the only indicator as to the original root word (cf. don, a hill) |
| der, derry, dor, dore | I, SG | grove, particularly of oaks | Derry, Glandore, Loch Doire nam Mart, Derry Cairngorm | prefix | Anglicised form of doire. |
| din, dinas | W, K | fort | Dinas Powys, Castle an Dinas, Dinas Dinlle | prefix | homologous to dun; see below |
| dol | Bry, P, W | meadow, low-lying area by river | Dolgellau, Dull | prefix | |
| don, den | Bry via OE | hill, down | Abingdon, Bredon, Willesden | suffix | |
| dona(gh)-, donny- | I | ancient church | Donnybrook, Donaghadee | prefix | Anglicised form of domhnach. |
| droghed, drohed, drohid, drochit | I, SG | bridge | Clondrohid, Drogheda, Drumnadrochit | prefix | From Irish droichead, Scottish Gaelic drochaid. |
| druineach | SG | uncertain | Airigh nan Druineach, Cladh nan Druineach, Druineachan | | |
| drom, drum, drim | SG, I, W, C | ridge, back | Drumchapel, Drumnacanvy, Drumnadrochit, Dundrum, Mindrum | prefix | Gaelic examples are anglicised from druim |
| dubh, dow, dhu, duff | SG, I | black | Eilean Dubh, Eas Dubh, Dublin | suffix, occasionally prefix | anglicised from dubh |
| dun, dum, don, doune | SG, I, C, Bry, P | fort | Dundee, Dumbarton, Dungannon, Dumfries, Donegal, Dundalk, Dundrum, Dùn Èideann | prefix | See also Dun. Derived from dùn. |
| Eagles, Eglos, Eglews, Eccles, Eglwys | W, K(<L), C, P, I, SG | church | Eaglesham, Egloskerry, Ecclefechan, Eccles, Ecclesfield, Eglish, Eaglescliffe, Egglescliffe | | from Latin ecclesia, thus cognate to French église and G. eaglais, see also the word ecclesiastic, meaning "of the church". |
| eilean | I, SG | island | Eilean Donan, Eilean Sùbhainn, Na h-Eileanan an Iar | | Sometimes anglicised to island as a prefix e.g. Island Davaar |
| ennis, inch, innis, innish, inish, insch | I, SG | island | Inishcrone, Ennis, Inch, Insch, Markinch | | From Irish inis, Scottish Gaelic innis. |
| esk(ra), -iscr-, esker | I | esker | Eskra, Esker Riada, Enniscrone | | From Irish eiscir, ridge left by retreat of a glacier during the Last Ice Age. |
| ey, ay | OE haeg | enclosure | Hornsey, Hay (-on-Wye), Roundhay | | unrelated to -ey 'island', below; see also -hay below |
| ey, ea, eg, eig | OE īeġ, ēġ, īġ | island | Romsey, Athelney, Ely, Dursey Island | | cf. Low German -oog as in Langeoog, Dutch -oog as in Schiermonnikoog, Norwegian øy(-a) as in Ulvøya |
| farran-, fer(r)in- | I, SG | piece of land | Feriniquarrie, Farranfore, Farranree, Ferindonald | prefix | From fearann. Also suggested as an etymology for the Faroe Islands and Lindisfarne. |
| fer-, fear- | I | men (referring to a tribe or clan) | Fercale, County Fermanagh | prefix | anglicised from fir. |
| fern, farn(e), phairn | I, SG | alder | Farney, Hill of Fearn, Carsphairn, Ferns | prefix | anglicised from Irish fearn, Scottish Gaelic feàrna. |
| field | OE | open land, a forest clearing | Sheffield, Huddersfield, Wakefield, Mansfield, Macclesfield, Mirfield, Chesterfield, Murrayfield, Whitefield, Lichfield, Driffield | suffix | cf. Ger. Feld |
| fin, finn, ven, phoen- | I, SG | bright, clear, white, holy | Findochty, Finglas, Ventry, Phoenix Park | prefix | anglicised from fionn, finn |
| firth, ford | ON, S | fjord, inlet | Burrafirth, Firth of Forth, Solway Firth, Firth of Clyde, Broadford, Milford Haven, Strangford, Waterford | | from Norse fjorðr |
| firth, frith, fridd | OE W | wood or woodland or uncultivated land with small trees and bushes at the edge of cultivated land, especially on hillsides. | Holmfirth, Chapel-en-le-Frith | suffix | |
| fold | OE | pen (enclosure) | Dunsfold, Chiddingfold, Cowfold, Alfold, Slinfold | suffix | |
| ford, forth, ffordd | OE, W | ford, crossing, road | Saltford, Bradford, Ampleforth, Watford, Salford, Castleford, Guildford, Stafford, Chelmsford, Retford, Dartford, Bideford, Knutsford, Burford, Sleaford Penffordd, Hereford (Henffordd in Welsh), Ilford, Stratford, Romford | | cf. Ger. -furt as in Frankfurt am Main |
| fos, foss, ffos | L, OE, W | ditch | River Foss, Fangfoss | | Separate from ON foss, force, below |
| foss, force | ON | waterfall | Aira Force, High Force, Hardraw Force, Janet's Foss | | Separate from L/OE fos, foss, above |
| frack | I, SG | heather (ling) | Letterfrack, Fraoch Bheinn, Mullach Fraoch-choire | suffix | anglicised from fraoch |
| gurran(e) | I | grove | Gurrane, Gurranabraher, Gurraneachoel | prefix | From Irish garrán. |
| garry-, gara- | I, SG | garden | Garryspillane, Garryowen, Garafad | prefix | From Irish garraí, Scottish Gaelic gàrradh. |
| gate | ON | road | Gate Helmsley, Harrogate | | |
| gar(t) | SG | enclosed field | Garscube, Gartmore, Gartness | | |
| garth | ON, W | enclosure, small summit or ridge | Aysgarth | | cf. Ger. -gart as in Stuttgart |
| garv, gorv | I, SG | rough | Garvagh, Garvaghey, Garbh Sgeir, Garvellachs | suffix | Anglicisation of garbh. |
| gee, gwee | I | estuary | Geesala, Gweedore | suffix | Anglicisation of gaoth. |
| gill, ghyll | ON | ravine, narrow gully | Gillamoor, Garrigill, Dungeon Ghyll | | |
| glas, -glass | I, SG | stream | Glasnevin, Douglas, Baltinglass | prefix, suffix | Anglicisation of glas. |
| glas, -glass, glaze | I, SG, W, C | green, dark grey, pale | Pant Glas, Ballyglass, Lusty Glaze, Eilean Glas | suffix | Irish/Welsh/Cornish/Scottish Gaelic glas. |
| glen, glyn | SG, I, W | narrow valley, dale | Rutherglen, Glenarm, Corby Glen, Glen Nevis | | anglicised from gleann |
| glind | OE | enclosure | Glynde | | |
| gorm | I, SG | blue, dark | Galgorm, Cairngorms | suffix | Irish/Scottish Gaelic gorm. |
| gort, gor- | I, SG | enclosure, small field | Gort, Gorbals, Gortahork | | Irish/Scottish Gaelic gort. |
| gowt | | Water outfall, sluice, drain | Guthram Gowt, Anton's Gowt | | First reference gives the word as the local pronunciation of go out; the second as "A water-pipe under the ground. A sewer. A flood-gate, through which the marsh-water runs from the reens into the sea." Reen is a Somerset word, not used in the Fens. Gout appears to be cognate with the French égout, "sewer". Though the modern mind associates the word "sewer" with foul water, it was not always necessarily so. |
| ham | OE | farm, homestead, [settlement] | Rotherham, Newham, Nottingham, Tottenham, Oldham, Newsham, Faversham, West Ham, Birmingham, Lewisham, Gillingham, Chatham, Chippenham, Cheltenham, Buckingham, Dagenham, Evesham, Wrexham, Dereham, Altrincham, Durham, Billingham, Hexham | suffix | often confused by hamm, an enclosure; cf. Nl. hem, Ger. Heim, and Norwegian heim as in Trondheim. |
| -hay, -hays, -hayes | OE | area of land enclosed by a hedge | Cheslyn Hay, Walsall; Floyer Hayes, Devon; Northern Hay, Shill Hay, Southern Hay, Northern Hay, Fryers Hay, Bon Hay, all surrounding the City of Exeter, Devon; Moor Hayes, Cullompton, Devon; Billinghay, Lincolnshire | suffix | see also Hayes (surname), sometimes derived from this topological source |
| hithe, hythe | OE | wharf, place for landing boats | Rotherhithe, Hythe, Erith, Covehithe | | |
| holm | ON, OE | holly, island | Holmfirth, Lealholm, Hempholme, Holme, Hubberholme, Lindholme | | |
| hope | OE | valley, enclosed area | Woolhope, Glossop | | cf. Ger. Hof |
| Howe | ON haugr | mound, hill, knoll | Howe, Norfolk, Howe, North Yorkshire | | Appears in the famous quadruply redundant toponym Torpenhow Hill. |
| hurst, hirst | OE | (wooded) hill | Goudhurst, Herstmonceux, Woodhurst, Lyndhurst | | cf. Ger. Horst |
| illan, illaun, island | I | island | Illanmaster, Islandeady, Illaunloughan | prefix | Irish oileán. |
| inch | C, I, P, SG | island, dry area in marsh | Ince, Inchmarnock, Insch, Keith Inch | | cf. W. ynys. Occurs as Ince and Ins in Northern England. |
| ing (1) | OE ingas | people of | Reading, the people (followers) of Reada, Spalding, the people of Spald, Nottingham, the people (followers) of Snotta, Wapping, Kettering, Worthing, Dorking, Barking, Epping Woking, Pickering | suffix | sometimes survives in an apparent plural form e.g. Hastings; also, often combined with 'ham'->ingham or 'ton'->ington; 'homestead of the people of' (e.g. Birmingham, Bridlington); cf. Nl. and Ger. -ing(en) as in Groningen, Göttingen, or Straubing |
| ing (2) | OE | place, small stream | Lockinge | suffix | difficult to distinguish from -ingas without examination of early place-name forms. |
| ings | OE | marshland | Clifton Ings, Fairburn Ings, Sutton Ings, Far Ings | suffix | |
| ington | OE | In most cases it is ing (1) + ton ('town'), with exceptions | Alwington, Bridlington, Dalmellington | suffix meaning "settlement of a tribe or family" | Walter William Skeat writes that in some names only ton is a suffix, while "ing" is a later modification, e.g., of personal names ending in "in", judging from the older spelling of the placename, e.g., Eggington in fact means Ecgwynn's farm. But in some cases the exact origin is unclear. |
| ingham | OE | ing (1) + ham ('homestead, 'village') | Buckingham, Wolsingham, Sandringham | suffix | |
| inver, inner, ineer | SG, I | mouth (of a river), confluence, a meeting of waters | Inverness, Inveraray, Innerleithen | prefix | cf. aber. Scottish Gaelic ionbhar, Irish inbhear. |
| keld | ON | spring | Keld, Threlkeld | | |
| keth, cheth | C | wood | Penketh, Culcheth | suffix | cf. W. coed |
| kil, cil, kill, killie | SG, I, W | monastic cell, church | Kilmarnock, Kill, Kilkenny, Kilgetty, Cil-y-coed, Kilburn, Kilmacolm | prefix | anglicised from cill, itself from Latin cella. Often it can be difficult to tell if Kil-, Killie- refers to a church or to a forest. |
| kil, kill, kyle, killie, quilla | SG, I | wood | Lugnaquilla, Kylemore, Killiecrankie, Kilmacsimon | prefix | anglicised from Irish coill, Scottish Gaelic coille. Often it can be difficult to tell if Kil-, Killie- refers to a church or to a forest. |
| kin, ken, con, can, carn | SG, I | head | Kincardine, Kinallen, Kenmare | prefix | anglicised from ceann. Cognate of C, P and W pen and in some place names, may represent a Gaelicisation of the C and P form. |
| king | OE/ON | king, tribal leader | King's Norton, King's Lynn, Kingston, Kingston Bagpuize, Seven Kings, Kingskerswell, Coningsby | | |
| kirk | ON | church | Kirkwall, Ormskirk, Colkirk, Falkirk, Kirkstead, Kirkby on Bain, Kirklees, Whitkirk | | See also Kirk (placename element). cf. ger -kirch as in Altkirch, Nl. -kerk as in Heemskerk |
| knock, cnwc | I, SG, C, Bry, W | hill, rocky hillock | Knockhill, Knock, County Clare, Knock, Isle of Lewis, Knockentiber, Knock, Cnwc-Parc-y-morfa, Pembrokeshire, Wales, Pen-cnwc, Pembrokeshire, Wales | | anglicised from cnoc; Cronk on Isle of Man. |
| kyle, kyles | SG | narrows | Kyle of Lochalsh, Kyles of Bute | prefix | anglicised from Caol and caolas |
| lan, lhan, llan | C, K, P, W | church, churchyard, village with church, parish | Lanteglos (Cornwall), Lhanbryde (Moray), Lanercost, Llanbedr Pont Steffan, Llanybydder, Llandudno, Llanelli, Llangefni, Llangollen | prefix, | See also Llan (placename) |
| lang | OE, ON | long | Langdale, Great Langton, Kings Langley, Langbank, Langwathby, Lang Toun | prefix | cf. Ger. -langen as in Erlangen; still in use in English dialect and Scots. |
| law, low | OE | from hlaw, a rounded hill | Charlaw, Tow Law, Lewes, Ludlow, North Berwick Law | often standalone | often a hill with a barrow or hillocks on its summit; still in use in Scotland. |
| le | NF | from archaic French lès, in the vicinity of, near to | Chester-le-Street, Burgh le Marsh, Stanford-le-Hope | interfix | Hartlepool appears to contain le by folk etymology; older spellings show no such element. |
| lea, ley, leigh | OE | from leah, a woodland clearing | Barnsley, Hadleigh, Leigh, Beverley, Keighley, Batley, Abbots Leigh | suffix (usually) | cf. Nl. -loo as in Waterloo, Ger. -loh as in Gütersloh |
| lea, liath | I, SG | light grey | Killylea, Monadhliath Mountains | suffix | Anglicisation of liath. |
| letter- | I, SG | hillside | Letterfrack, Letterkenny, Letterfearn | prefix | Anglicisation of leitir. |
| lin, llyn, Lynn | Bry, C, I, P, W | lake (or simply water) | Lindisfarne, Llyn Brianne | prefix (usually) | From Old Celtic lindon |
| ling, lyng | OE, ON | heather | Lingmell, Lingwood, Linga | | |
| lip | OE, ON | leap | Hartlip, Hindlip, Leixlip, Lippitts, Ruislip | suffix (usually) | From Old English hlȳp, Old Norse hleypa, both meaning "a leap". |
| lis(s)-, les-, lus- | I, SG | small ringfort | Lisburn, Lisnaskea, Lissycasey, Listowel, Lesmahagow, Luskentyre | prefix | Anglicisation of lios. |
| loch, lough | C, SG, I | lake, sea inlet | Loch Ryan, Lough Neagh, Sweethope Loughs, Glendalough, Loch Ness | | Generally found in Scotland and Ireland, but also a handful in England. |
| longfor(d), lonart | I, SG | landing-place for boats | Longford, Ballylongford, Longformacus | | Referred to landing-places used by Viking raiders; derived from Latin (navis) longa ('longship') and portus ('harbour'). |
| lurgan, lorgan | I | long ridge | Lurganure, Lurgan, Stillorgan | | Anglicisation of lorgan. |
| maum, maam, mam | I, SG | mountain pass | Maumtrasna, Mam Sodhail, Maam Valley | | Anglicisation of Irish mám, Scottish Gaelic màm. |
| magna | L | great, big | Appleby Magna, Chew Magna, Wigston Magna, Ludford Magna | | Primarily a medieval affectation |
| mawr | W | large, great | Pen-y-cae-mawr, Pegwn Mawr, Merthyr Mawr | | Fawr is the mutated form |
| magh, may, moy, moi(gh), ma- | I, SG | plain | Maynooth, Mallow, Moira, Maybole | | Anglicisation of Irish maigh, Scottish Gaelic magh. |
| mere | OE | lake, pool | Windermere, Grasmere, Cromer, Tranmere | | See also Mere (lake). cf. Ger. Meer, also likely a cognate of the Norwegian Møre |
| minster | OE | large church, monastery | Westminster, Wimborne Minster, Leominster, Upminster, Kidderminster, Minster Lovell, Ilminster | | cf. Ger. Münster |
| mona, money, moan | I, SG | peatland | Ballymoney, Cornamona, Inchmoan | | Anglicisation of Irish móna, monadh, Scottish Gaelic mòine. |
| mona, money, winga, winna, winny, vinna, vinny, vunnia, bonni, bunny, mini | I, SG | thicket | Moneymore, Ballywinna, Ballinvinny, Minishant | | Anglicisation of muine. |
| monaster | I | monastery | Monasterevin, Monasterboice, Monasteraden | prefix | Anglicisation of mainistir, from Latin monasterium. |
| more | I, SG | large, great | Dunmore, Lismore, Strathmore | | Anglicised from mòr |
| moss | OE, S | Swamp, bog | Mossley, Lindow Moss, Moss Side | | cf. Ger. Moos; Occasionally represents Bry maɣes |
| -mouth | ME | Mouth (of a river), bay | Plymouth, Bournemouth, Portsmouth, Monmouth, Sidmouth, Weymouth, Lynmouth, East Portlemouth, Exmouth, Yarmouth, Falmouth, Dartmouth | suffix | cf. Ger. Münden or Gemünd |
| mulla(gh), mulh- | I, SG | summit | Mullaghmast, Mullaghbrack, Mulhuddart, Mullach Fraoch-choire | prefix | Anglicised from mullach |
| mullin-, miln-, mul- | I, SG | mill | Mullinahone, Mullingar, Bellanamullia, Milngavie, Mulben | prefix | Anglicised from muileann |
| mynydd | W | mountain | Mynydd Moel | prefix | |
| nan-, nans- | K | valley | Nancledra, Nansledan | prefix | |
| nant- | C, W | ravine or the stream in it | Nantgarw, Nantwich | prefix | same origin as nan, nans above |
| -ness | OE, ON | promontory, headland (literally 'nose') | Sheerness, Skegness, Furness, Durness, Dungeness, Bo’ness, Bowness-on-Windermere | suffix | |
| -noe | I, SG | new | Ballynoe, Templenoe | suffix | Anglicised from nua |
| nor | OE | north | Norton, Norbury, Norwich | prefix | |
| owen | I | river | Owenbeg, River Owenroe | | Anglicised from abhainn |
| pant | C, P, W | a hollow | Pant Glas, Pant (Merthyr Tydfil), Pant (Shropshire), Panbride | | |
| parva | L | little | Appleby Parva, Wigston Parva, Ruston Parva, Glen Parva, Thornham Parva, Ludford Parva | | |
| pen | C, K, W, P | head (headland or hill), top, far end of, end of | Penzance, Pendle, Penrith, Pen-y-ghent, Penarth, Pencoed, Penmaen, Pengam, Penffordd, Pembrokeshire, Pen-y-gwryd, Pennan | prefix, | also Pedn in W. Cornwall |
| pit | Bry, P, SG (< P) | portion, share, farm | Corstopitum, Pitlochry (Perthshire), Pitmedden | prefix (usually) | Scottish Pit- names typically employ a Pictish loanword into Gaelic. Homologous with K peath, W peth. |
| pol, pwll, pol(l), poul | C, K, W, I, SG | pool, lake, hole | Polperro, Polruan, Polzeath, Pwllheli, Gwynedd, Pwll, Llanelli, Llanfairpwllgwyngyll, Pollagh, Poulaphouca, Polglass | prefix | |
| pont | L, K, W, C | bridge | Pontypridd, Pontypool, Penpont, Pontefract | prefix | can also be found in its mutated form bont, e.g., Pen-y-bont (Bridgend); originally from Latin pons (pont–) |
| pool | OE | harbour | Liverpool, Blackpool, Hartlepool, Welshpool, Pool of London | suffix | |
| port | I | stronghold, fort | Portlaoise | prefix | Easily confused with port for harbour or landing-ground. |
| port | ME, I | port, harbour, landing-ground | Davenport, Southport, Stockport, Bridport, Portsmouth, Newport, Maryport, Ellesmere Port, Portadown | | |
| porth | K, W | harbour | Porthcawl, Porthgain, Porthaethwy | prefix | |
| ra(t)h, rait | SG, I | small ringfort | Rathdrum, Rathfarnham, Rathfriland, Raheny, Rathven, Rait, Ravernet | prefix | From Irish ráth, Scottish Gaelic ràth. |
| -rea(gh), -reva(gh), -riach | SG, I | streaked, speckled | Loughrea, Moneyreagh, Cloonsheerevagh, Braeriach | suffix | From riabhach. |
| rigg, rig | ON, S | ridge | Askrigg, Bonnyrigg | suffix | |
| rin, ren, rine, reen, ring, rhyn | I, SG, W | headland, promontory | Rinvyle, Ringville, Renfrew, Weston Rhyn | prefix | From Irish/Scottish Gaelic rinn, Welsh rhyn. |
| -roe, -roy | I, SG | red, red-brown | Murroe, Portroe, Inverroy | suffix | From Irish rua, Scottish Gaelic ruadh. |
| ros(s), rosh, rus(h), rose | I, SG | wood, wooded promontory | Roscommon, Rush, Rosemarkie, New Ross | prefix | From ros. |
| royd | OE | field, clearing | Mytholmroyd, Hebden Royd, Fox Royd | suffix | From Old English rodu |
| sall, salla, sally, shellach | I, SG | willow | Ballysally, Sallins, Achnashellach | | From Irish saile, Scottish Gaelic seileach. |
| -sex, -sax | OE, C | Saxon, Englishman | Sussex, Middlesex, Wessex, Pennersax | suffix | Saxon settlements |
| shan- | I, SG | old | Shanballymore, Shankill, Shandon | prefix | From sean. |
| shaw | OE | a wood, a thicket | Openshaw, Wythenshawe, Shaw and Crompton | standalone or suffix | a fringe of woodland, from OE sceaga |
| shep, ship | OE | sheep | Shepshed, Shepton Mallet, Shipton, Shipley | prefix | |
| sheskin, seskin, cessnock | I, SG | marsh, quagmire | Sheskin, Seskinore, Cessnock | prefix | From Irish seascann, Scottish Gaelic seasgan. |
| shire | OE | county | Bedfordshire, Berkshire, Buckinghamshire, Cambridgeshire, Cheshire, Derbyshire, Gloucestershire, Hampshire, Herefordshire, Hertfordshire, Huntingdonshire, Lancashire, Lincolnshire, Leicestershire, Northamptonshire, Nottinghamshire, Oxfordshire, Shropshire, Staffordshire, Warwickshire, Wiltshire, Worcestershire and Yorkshire | suffix | |
| ske(y)-, skay, skea(gh), sgiack, sgiach, skeith | I, SG | bush, hawthorn | Skehana, Skeheenarinky, Ballyskeagh, Clonskeagh, River Sgiack, Auchenskeith | | From Irish sceach, Scottish Gaelic sgitheach. |
| screen, skreen, skrine, skryne | I | shrine | Skreen, Skryne, Ballinascreen | | From Irish scrín. |
| slieve, sla- | I, SG | mountain | Slievenamon, Slieve Donard, Slamannan | prefix | From sliabh. |
| sra(gh), srah, stra, strad, strath, straw | C, P, I, SG | floodplain, strath | Strathspey, Sragh, Stranorlar, Straw | prefix | From srath. |
| stan | OE | stone, stony | Stanmore, Stamford, Stanlow | prefix | cf. Ger. Stein |
| stead | OE | place, enclosed pasture | Hampstead, Berkhamsted, Hemel Hempstead | suffix | cf. Ger. Stadt or -stätt as in Eichstätt, Nl. -stad as in Zaanstad |
| ster | ON | farm | Lybster, Scrabster | suffix | cf. -bost from (bol)staðr |
| stoke | OE stoc | dependent farmstead, secondary settlement | Stoke-upon-Trent, Stoke Damerel, Basingstoke, Stoke Mandeville, Stoke Gabriel | standalone (usually) | |
| stow | OE | (holy) place (of assembly) | Stow-on-the-Wold, Padstow, Bristol, Stowmarket, Felixstowe | | |
| streat, street | L, OE | road (Roman) | Spital-in-the-Street, Chester-le-Street, Streatham | | derived from strata, L. 'paved road' |
| sud, sut, suf | OE | south | Sudbury, Sutton, Suffolk | prefix | From Old English sūþ |
| swin | OE | pigs, swine | Swindon, Swinford, Swinton | | |
| tarn | ON | lake | Malham Tarn, Yeadon Tarn, Talkin Tarn | | In modern English, usually a glacial lake in a coombe. |
| ta(gh), taugh, te(e), ti(gh), tay | I, SG | house | Taney, Taghadoe, Timoleague, Tyndrum, Tayvallich | prefix | From Irish teach, Scottish Gaelic taigh. |
| temple | I, SG | church | Templemore, Ballintemple, Temple | prefix | From Irish teampall, Scottish Gaelic teampull. Some examples are linked to the Knights Templar. |
| thorp, thorpe | ON | secondary settlement | Cleethorpes, Thorpeness, Scunthorpe, Armthorpe, Bishopthorpe, Mablethorpe, Osmondthorpe | | See also Thorp. An outlier of an earlier settlement. cf. Ger. Dorf, Nl. -dorp as in Badhoevedorp |
| ter, tir, tyr | I, SG | country, land | County Tyrone, Terenure, Terryglass, Tiree | prefix | From Irish tír, Scottish Gaelic tìr; cognate with Latin terra. |
| termon, tarmon | I | sanctuary, boundary | Termonfeckin, Tarmonbarry, Termonmaguirk | prefix | From Irish tearmann. Land belonging to early Christian monasteries and churches on which right of sanctuary prevailed. |
| thwaite, twatt | ON thveit | a forest clearing with a dwelling, or parcel of land | Huthwaite, Twatt, Slaithwaite, Thornthwaite, Braithwaite, Bassenthwaite, Finsthwaite, Thwaite Mills | suffix | |
| tieve, too | I | hillside | Tievebulliagh, Tievenadarragh, Tooban | prefix | From taobh. |
| tilly, tullie, tulloch | SG | hillock | Tillicoultry, Tillydrone, Tulliallan | prefix | |
| toft | ON | homestead | Lowestoft, Fishtoft, Langtoft (Lincs), Langtoft (ER of Yorks), Wigtoft | suffix (usually) | |
| tober, tubber | I, SG | well | Ballintober, Tubber, Tobermory | | From tobar. |
| Tre-, Tra- | C, K, P, W | settlement | Tranent, Trevose Head, Tregaron, Trenear, Treorchy, Treherbert, Trealaw, Treharris, Trehafod, Tredegar, | prefix (usually) | |
| treath, traeth, tra, try | K, W, I, SG | beach | Tywardreath, Traeth Mwnt, Cardigan, Tramore, Ventry | | |
| tuam, tom, toom(e) | I | tumulus, burial-mound | Tuam, Toomevara | | From tuaim. |
| tulla(gh), tully, tullow, tullos | I, SG | hillock, mound, heap | Tullamore, Tullyallen, Tullow, Tullos, Tillicoultry | prefix | From tulach. |
| tun, ton | OE tun | enclosure, estate, homestead | Skipton, Elston, Tunstead, Warrington, Patrington, Brighton, Coniston, Clacton, Everton, Broughton, Luton, Merton, Wincanton, Bolton, Workington, Preston, Bridlington, Stockton-on-Tees, Taunton, Boston, Acton, Brixton, Kensington, Paddington, Crediton, Honiton, Hamilton, Northampton, Southampton, Paignton, Tiverton, Helston, Wolverhampton, Buxton, Congleton, Darlington, Northallerton, Longframlington | | OE pronunciation 'toon'. Compare en. town, Nl. tuin (garden) and Ger. Zaun (fence); all derived from Germanic root tun |
| turlough, turlagh | I | turlough | Turlough, Turlaghmore | prefix | From turlach, a lake that fills seasonally. |
| upon, on, in | ME | by/"upon" a river | Newcastle upon Tyne, Kingston upon Hull, Stratford-upon-Avon, Staines-upon-Thames, Burton upon Trent, Berwick-upon-Tweed, Walton-on-Thames, Hampton-in-Arden | | |
| urlar, urlaur, orlar | I, SG | flat | Stranorlar, Urlar Burn, Urlaur Lough | | From Irish urlár, Scottish Gaelic ùrlar, both meaning "floor." |
| vea(gh), vei(gh), beattie, beath, beigh, beith | I, SG | beech | Glenveagh, Dalbeattie, Dunbeath, Glenbeigh, Aghavea, Clonbeith | suffix | From beithe. |
| wall, walla, willa | OE | foreigners | Cornwall, Kirkwall, Heswall, Thingwall, Childwall, Wallasey, Willaston | | Derived from wealas meaning 'foreigners', as was also applied to the Celtic people of Wales |
| weald, wold | OE | high woodland | Wealdstone, Stow-on-the-Wold, Southwold, Easingwold, Methwold, Cuxwold, Hockwold | | cf. Ger. Wald |
| wes | OE | west | Wessex | prefix | |
| wick, wich, wych, wyke | L, OE | place, settlement | Ipswich, Norwich, Alnwick, West Bromwich, Nantwich, Prestwich, Northwich, Woolwich, Horwich, Middlewich, Harwich, Bloxwich, Hammerwich, Sandwich, Aldwych, Gippeswyk, Heckmondwike, Warwick | suffix | related to Latin vicus (place), cf. Nl. wijk, Ger. weig as in Braunschweig. Also, cf. Jorvik (modern York) |
| wick | ON vik | bay | Wick, Lerwick, Winwick, Barnoldswick, Keswick, Prestwick, North Berwick, Berwick-upon-Tweed, Goodwick, Glodwick, Ardwick, Beswick, Walberswick | suffix | |
| win, vin, fin | Bry | white | Winchester, Wimborne (earlier Winborne), Vindolanda, Fintry | prefix | uenta- attested in Roman period. Compare with gwyn |
| worth, worthy, wardine | OE | enclosure | Tamworth, Farnworth, Rickmansworth, Nailsworth, Kenilworth, Lutterworth, Bedworth, Letchworth, Halesworth, Wirksworth, Whitworth, Cudworth, Haworth, Holsworthy, Bredwardine | suffix (usually) | cf. Nl. -waard as in Heerhugowaard |
| ynys | W | island | Ynys Môn (Anglesey), Ynyslas | | |

== See also ==
- English Place-Name Society
- Germanic toponymy
- Place name origins
- Place names in Ireland
- Placenames Database of Ireland
- Scottish toponymy
- Toponymy in the United Kingdom and Ireland
- Toponymy of England
- Welsh toponymy
