= Winnick =

Winnick is a surname. Notable people with the surname include:

- David Winnick, British politician
- Gary Winnick, American financier
- Gary Winnick (game developer), American computer game designer, writer, artist and animator
- Katheryn Winnick, Canadian actress
- Maurice Winnick, English musician and dance band leader

== See also ==
- Winick
- Winnicki
- Winnik
- Winwick (disambiguation)
- Vinnick
