= Merton =

Merton may refer to:

== People ==
- Merton (surname)
- Merton (given name)
- Merton (YouTube), American YouTube personality

== Fictional characters ==
- Merton Matowski, an alternate name for "Moose" Mason, an Archie Comics character
- Richard Grey, Baron Merton, in the British television series Downton Abbey
- The title character of The Mrs Merton Show, a British television series

== Places ==
=== Australia ===
- Merton (New South Wales), a farm located near Denman, in the Hunter Region
- Merton, Victoria, a town
  - Merton railway station
- Merton, Tasmania, part of Glenorchy

=== England ===
- London Borough of Merton
  - Merton, London, an area of London and former parish
  - Merton (electoral division), Greater London Council
- Merton, Devon, a village, ecclesiastical parish, former manor and civil parish
- Merton, Norfolk, a civil parish
- Merton, Oxfordshire, a village and civil parish

=== New Zealand ===
- Merton, New Zealand, a farming community

=== United States ===
- Merton Township, Steele County, Minnesota
  - Merton, Minnesota, an unincorporated community
- Merton Township, South Dakota
- Merton, Wisconsin, a town
- Merton (village), Wisconsin, a village partially within the town

== Other uses ==
- Merton College, Oxford, one of the colleges of the University of Oxford
  - Merton Field, a grass playing field south of Merton College
- Merton Street, Oxford
- Merton College, London, formerly a further education college, as of 2009 the Merton campus of South Thames College
- Battle of Meretun or Morton, fought in 871 between the Saxon army of Wessex and the Danish Great Heathen Army
- The Merton, a high-rise development located in Kennedy Town, Hong Kong
- Viscount Merton, a UK title

== See also ==
- Statute of Merton, considered the first English statute, passed in 1235
- Merton Professors, two professorships in English in the University of Oxford
- Merton Park, London
- Merton Priory or Abbey, London
- Murton (disambiguation)
