= Hythe =

Hythe, from Anglo-Saxon hȳð, may refer to a landing-place, port or haven, either as an element in a toponym, such as Rotherhithe in London, or to:

== Places ==
=== Australia ===
- Hythe, Tasmania

=== Canada ===
- Hythe, Alberta, a hamlet in Canada

=== England ===
- The Hythe, Essex, part of Colchester
- Hythe, Hampshire, a village near Southampton
- Hythe, Kent, a small coastal town near Folkestone
  - Hythe (UK Parliament constituency)
- Hythe End, a village, now part of Staines
- Egham Hythe, an area near Egham, Surrey
- New Hythe, a village in Kent
- Small Hythe, a hamlet near Tenterden in Kent
- West Hythe, a hamlet near Palmarsh in Kent

== Other uses ==
- Short Hythe (a post-war British flying boat)
- HMS Hythe (J194)
- HMS Hythe (1905), an auxiliary minesweeper which sank in 1915 in the Dardanelles with the loss of 154 lives
- Hythe Venetian Fete, a traditional water carnival

== See also ==
- Hithe, Kenya
- Folkestone and Hythe (disambiguation)
- Hythe railway station (disambiguation)
