= Hithe =

Hithe may refer to:

- Hithe, Kenya
- Hythe
