= Murton =

Murton could refer to:

== Places ==
- Murton, Cumbria, England
- Murton, County Durham, England
- Murton, Northumberland, in Ord, near Berwick-upon-Tweed, England
- Murton, North Yorkshire, near York, England
- Murton, Tyne and Wear, England, historically in Northumberland
- Murton, Swansea, Wales
- Murton Grange, near Helmsley

== People ==
- Murton (surname)

== See also ==
- Merton (disambiguation)
