= Lochbuie =

Lochbuie may refer to:

- Lochbuie, Mull, Scotland
- Lochbuie, Colorado, United States
- Lochbuie Road, Highland, Scotland

== See also ==
- MV Loch Buie, a Caledonian MacBrayne ferry
- Loch Buidhe (disambiguation)
