= Toponymy in the United Kingdom and Ireland =

Great Britain and Ireland have a very varied toponymy due to the different settlement patterns, political and linguistic histories. In addition to the old and modern varieties of English, Scottish Gaelic, Irish Gaelic and Welsh, many other languages and cultures have influenced geographical names including Anglo-Normans, Anglo-Saxons, Romans and Vikings. Ultimately, most of the toponyms derive from the Celtic, Romance (including Italic) and North and West Germanic branches of the Indo-European language family, although there is evidence of some Pre-Indo-European languages.

The list of generic forms in place names in the British Isles gives an overview of common elements of place names throughout the British Isles, as well as their meanings and origins. Additionally, the toponymy of different parts of the United Kingdom and Ireland are individually discussed in greater depth the following articles:

- English toponymy
- Irish toponymy covers the whole of Ireland as the two political entities have only been separate since 1921.
- Scottish toponymy
- Welsh toponymy
