= Loch Arienas =

Freshwater in Scotland

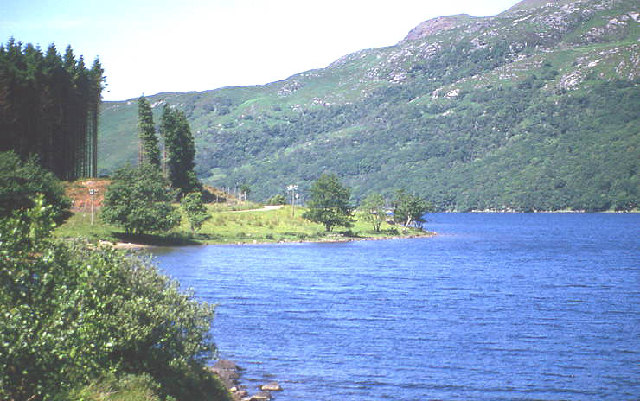

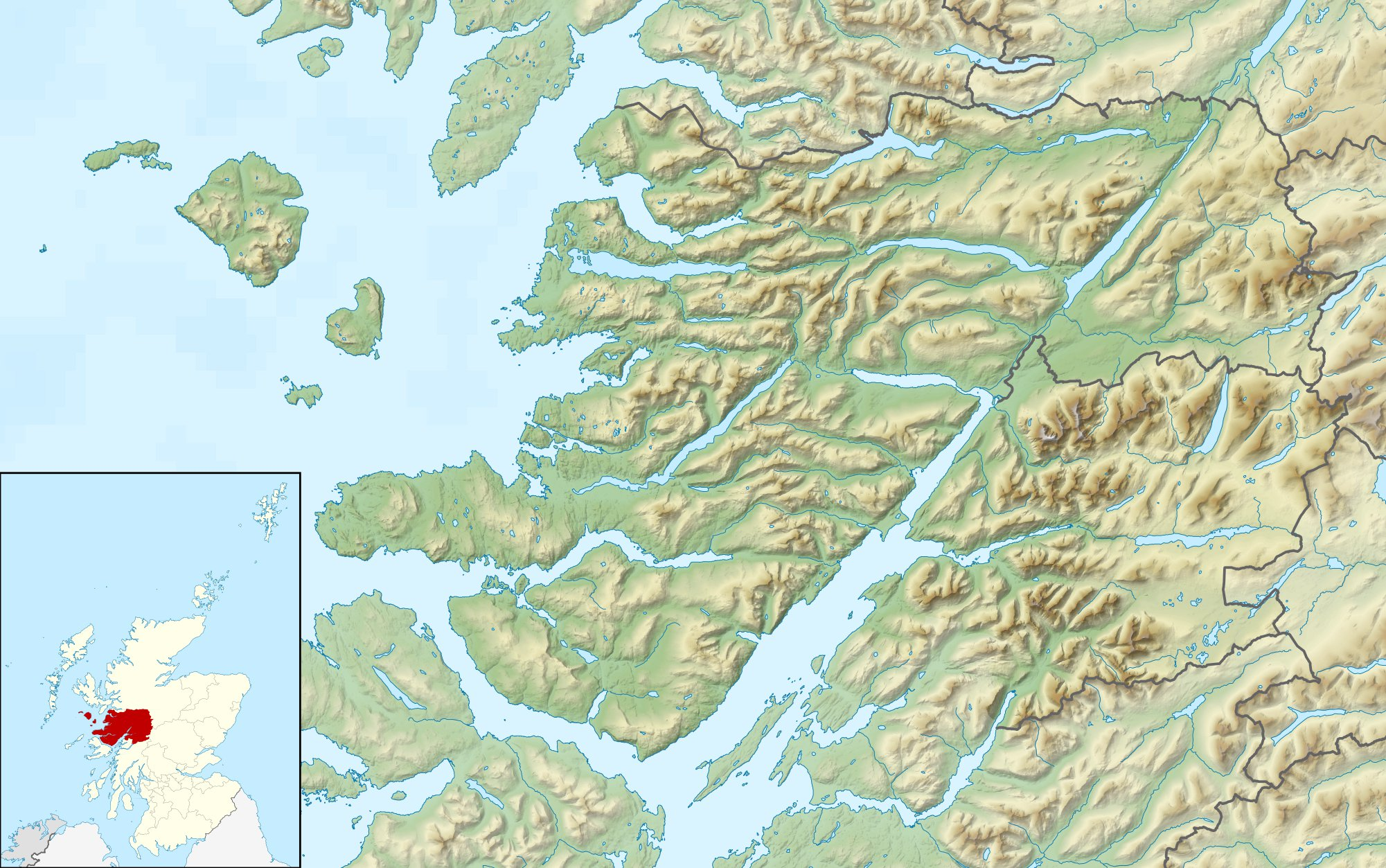
- Location within Lochaber
- Location: Morvern, Lochaber, Scotland
- Coordinates: 56.59569°N 5.77756°W
- Type: freshwater
- Primary inflows: Arienas Burn, Allt Àgh Choire
- Primary outflows: Loch Doire nam Mart, River Aline
- Basin countries: Scotland
- Max. length: 3.2 km (2.0 mi)
- Max. width: 1.21 km (0.75 mi)
- Surface area: 170 ha (420 acres)
- Average depth: 17.2 m (56 ft)
- Max. depth: 35 m (115 ft)
- Water volume: 29,300,000 m^{3} (1.03×10^{9} ft^{3})
- Shore length^{1}: 8 km (5.0 mi)
- Surface elevation: 12 m (39 ft)
- ^{1} Shore length is not a well-defined measure.

Loch Arienas is an extensive, lowland, freshwater loch on the Ardtornish Estate on the Morvern peninsula in the Scottish Highlands. It lies in a west-northwest to east-southeast direction, is approximately 3.2 km (2.0 mi) long and 1.21 km (0.75 mi) wide, and is at an altitude of 12 m (39 ft). The northern shore of the loch is mostly regular in shape, while the southern shore is irregular. Its average depth is 17.2 m (56 ft) and its maximum depth is 35 m (115 ft). The loch was surveyed on the 18 and 19 of August 1904 by John Hewitt as part of Sir John Murray's Bathymetrical Survey of Fresh-Water Lochs of Scotland 1897-1909.

The loch holds native wild brown trout and permits are required to fish the loch.

In the wood on the northern shore of the loch are the remains of charcoal burners’ huts and charcoal platforms. There is also a stone dyke dating from approximately 1780, which may have been used to enclose the wood to protect it from grazing animals.
