= List of United Kingdom locations: Newm-Newto =

The United Kingdom

This is part of the list of United Kingdom locations: a gazetteer of place names in the United Kingdom showing each place's locality and geographical coordinates.

== New (continued) ==
=== Newm ===
Location	Locality	Coordinates (links to map & photo sources)	OS grid reference
Newmachar	Aberdeenshire	57.26°N 02.20°W	NJ8819
Newmains	North Lanarkshire	55.78°N 03.88°W	NS8256
New Malden	Kingston upon Thames	51.39°N 00.26°W	TQ2168
Newman's End	Essex	51.78°N 00.18°E	TL5112
Newman's Green	Suffolk	52.05°N 00.74°E	TL8843
Newman's Place	Herefordshire	52.13°N 03.03°W	SO2949
Newmarket	Gloucestershire	51.68°N 02.23°W	ST8499
Newmarket	Suffolk	52.24°N 00.40°E	TL6463
Newmarket	Western Isles	58.22°N 06.39°W	NB4235
New Marske	Redcar and Cleveland	54.57°N 01.04°W	NZ6220
New Marston	Oxfordshire	51.75°N 01.24°W	SP5207
New Marton	Shropshire	52.89°N 02.99°W	SJ3334
New Micklefield	Leeds	53.78°N 01.33°W	SE4432
New Mill	Cornwall	50.26°N 05.08°W	SW8045
New Mill	Cumbria	54.42°N 03.46°W	NY0504
New Mill	Hertfordshire	51.79°N 00.66°W	SP9212
New Mill	Kirklees	53.56°N 01.75°W	SE1608
New Mill	Scottish Borders	55.38°N 02.79°W	NT5010
New Mill	Wiltshire	51.34°N 01.74°W	SU1861
Newmill	Cornwall	50.15°N 05.57°W	SW4534
Newmill	Moray	57.55°N 02.95°W	NJ4352
Newmill	Scottish Borders	55.38°N 02.86°W	NT4510
Newmillerdam	Wakefield	53.63°N 01.51°W	SE3215
New Mills	Cheshire	53.33°N 2.33°W	SJ7781
New Mills	Cornwall	50.33°N 04.95°W	SW9052
New Mills	Derbyshire	54.42°N 03.46°W	SJ9958
New Mills	Gloucestershire	51.73°N 02.53°W	SO6304
New Mills	Herefordshire	52.03°N 02.43°W	SO7038
New Mills	Highland	57.64°N 04.23°W	NH6764
New Mills	Powys	52.59°N 03.34°W	SJ0901
New Mills	Scottish Borders	55.73°N 02.76°W	NT5249
Newmills	Fife	56.05°N 03.59°W	NT0186
Newmiln	Perth and Kinross	56.45°N 03.42°W	NO1230
Newmilns	East Ayrshire	55.60°N 04.35°W	NS5237
New Milton	Hampshire	50.75°N 01.67°W	SZ2395
New Mistley	Essex	51.93°N 01.08°E	TM1231
New Moat	Pembrokeshire	51.88°N 04.82°W	SN0625
Newmore	Highland	57.53°N 04.44°W	NH5452
New Moston	Manchester	53.51°N 02.16°W	SD8902

=== Newn–Newo ===
Location	Locality	Coordinates (links to map & photo sources)	OS grid reference
Newnes	Shropshire	52.90°N 02.92°W	SJ3834
Newney Green	Essex	51.73°N 00.38°E	TL6507
Newnham	Cambridgeshire	52.19°N 00.10°E	TL4457
Newnham (Newnham on Severn)	Gloucestershire	51.79°N 02.45°W	SO6911
Newnham	Hampshire	51.27°N 00.99°W	SU7053
Newnham	Hertfordshire	52.01°N 00.19°W	TL2437
Newnham	Kent	51.27°N 00.79°E	TQ9557
Newnham	Northamptonshire	52.22°N 01.16°W	SP5759
Newnham	Warwickshire	52.23°N 01.78°W	SP1560
Newnham Bridge	Worcestershire	52.31°N 02.52°W	SO6469
New Ollerton	Nottinghamshire	53.20°N 01.01°W	SK6668
New Oscott	Birmingham	52.54°N 01.85°W	SP1094

=== Newp–Newq ===
Location	Locality	Coordinates (links to map & photo sources)	OS grid reference
New Pale	Cheshire	53.24°N 02.72°W	SJ5272
New Park	North Yorkshire	53.99°N 01.55°W	SE2956
New Parks	City of Leicester	52.64°N 01.18°W	SK5505
New Passage	South Gloucestershire	51.57°N 02.66°W	ST5486
New Pitsligo	Aberdeenshire	57.58°N 02.20°W	NJ8855
New Polzeath	Cornwall	50.57°N 04.92°W	SW9379
Newpool	Staffordshire	53.10°N 02.19°W	SJ8756
Newport	Cornwall	50.64°N 04.37°W	SX3285
Newport	Devon	51.06°N 04.05°W	SS5632
Newport	Dorset	50.74°N 02.17°W	SY8894
Newport	East Riding of Yorkshire	53.75°N 00.71°W	SE8530
Newport	Essex	51.98°N 00.21°E	TL5234
Newport	Gloucestershire	51.67°N 02.44°W	ST6997
Newport	Highland	58.19°N 03.49°W	ND1224
Newport	Isle of Wight	50.68°N 01.30°W	SZ4988
Newport	City of Newport	51.58°N 02.99°W	ST3188
Newport	Norfolk	52.68°N 01.69°E	TG5016
Newport	Pembrokeshire	52.01°N 04.84°W	SN0539
Newport	Shropshire	52.76°N 02.38°W	SJ7419
Newport	Somerset	51.00°N 02.98°W	ST3123
Newport-on-Tay	Fife	56.43°N 02.95°W	NO4127
Newport Pagnell	Milton Keynes	52.07°N 00.73°W	SP8743
Newpound Common	West Sussex	51.03°N 00.48°W	TQ0627
Newquay	Cornwall	50.40°N 05.08°W	SW8161
New Quay (Ceinewydd)	Ceredigion	52.20°N 04.37°W	SN3859

=== Newr ===
Location	Locality	Coordinates (links to map & photo sources)	OS grid reference
New Rackheath	Norfolk	52.65°N 01.37°E	TG2812
New Radnor	Powys	52.23°N 03.15°W	SO2160
New Ridley	Northumberland	54.92°N 01.92°W	NZ0559
New Road Side	Bradford	53.73°N 01.77°W	SE1527
New Road Side	North Yorkshire	53.87°N 02.04°W	SD9742
New Romney	Kent	50.97°N 00.93°E	TR0624
New Rossington	Doncaster	53.46°N 01.08°W	SK6197
New Row	Ceredigion	52.34°N 03.88°W	SN7273
New Row	Lancashire	53.83°N 02.54°W	SD6438
Newry	Co. Armagh	54.17°N 06.35°W	J085265

=== News ===
Location	Locality	Coordinates (links to map & photo sources)	OS grid reference
Newsam Green	Leeds	53.76°N 01.45°W	SE3630
New Sauchie	Clackmannanshire	56.12°N 03.78°W	NS8994
New Sawley	Derbyshire	52.88°N 01.30°W	SK4732
Newsbank	Cheshire	53.19°N 02.25°W	SJ8366
New Scarbro'	Leeds	53.80°N 01.63°W	SE2434
New Scone	Perth and Kinross	56.41°N 03.41°W	NO1326
Newsells	Hertfordshire	52.01°N 00.01°E	TL3837
Newsham	Lancashire	53.81°N 02.74°W	SD5136
Newsham (Richmondshire)	North Yorkshire	54.48°N 01.84°W	NZ1010
Newsham (Hambleton)	North Yorkshire	54.25°N 01.43°W	SE3784
Newsham	Northumberland	55.10°N 01.53°W	NZ3079
New Sharlston	Wakefield	53.67°N 01.42°W	SE3820
Newsholme	Bradford	53.84°N 01.97°W	SE0239
Newsholme	East Riding of Yorkshire	53.75°N 00.92°W	SE7129
Newsholme	Lancashire	53.95°N 02.24°W	SD8451
New Silksworth	Sunderland	54.87°N 01.42°W	NZ3753
New Skelton	Redcar and Cleveland	54.55°N 00.98°W	NZ6618
New Smithy	Derbyshire	53.33°N 01.92°W	SK0582
Newsome	Kirklees	53.62°N 01.78°W	SE1414
New Southgate	Enfield	51.61°N 00.13°W	TQ2992
New Springs	Wigan	53.55°N 02.60°W	SD6007
New Sprowston	Norfolk	52.65°N 01.29°E	TG2311
New Stanton	Derbyshire	52.94°N 01.31°W	SK4639
Newstead	Nottinghamshire	53.06°N 01.24°W	SK5152
Newstead	Scottish Borders	55.59°N 02.69°W	NT5634
Newstead	Stoke-on-Trent	52.95°N 02.16°W	SJ8940
Newstead	Wakefield	53.62°N 01.41°W	SE3914
New Stevenston	North Lanarkshire	55.80°N 03.98°W	NS7659
New Street	Kent	51.35°N 00.32°E	TQ6264
New Street	Staffordshire	53.06°N 01.92°W	SK0552
Newstreet Lane	Shropshire	52.92°N 02.56°W	SJ6237
New Swanage	Dorset	50.61°N 01.97°W	SZ0280
New Swannington	Leicestershire	52.73°N 01.37°W	SK4215

=== Newt ===
==== Newta–Newtom ====
Location	Locality	Coordinates (links to map & photo sources)	OS grid reference
Newtake	Devon	50.51°N 03.58°W	SX8870
New Thirsk	North Yorkshire	54.22°N 01.35°W	SE4281
Newthorpe	North Yorkshire	53.78°N 01.28°W	SE4732
Newthorpe	Nottinghamshire	53.00°N 01.28°W	SK4846
Newthorpe Common	Nottinghamshire	53.00°N 01.30°W	SK4745
New Thundersley	Essex	51.57°N 00.55°E	TQ7789
Newtoft	Lincolnshire	53.36°N 00.43°W	TF0486
