= Newsham =

Newsham may refer to:

== Places ==
- Newsham, County Durham, a settlement in County Durham
  - Aislaby, County Durham and Newsham, a civil parish in County Durham
- Newsham, Lancashire
- Newsham, Northumberland, a location in Northumberland, England
  - Newsham railway station, Northumberland
- Newsham, Hambleton, a location in North Yorkshire, England
  - Newsham with Breckenbrough, a civil parish in North Yorkshire
- Newsham, Richmondshire, North Yorkshire
- Newsham gas field, North Sea off Yorkshire

== People ==
- Brad Newsham (born 1951), American travel writer
- Joseph P. Newsham (1837–1919), American politician, lawyer, merchant and planter
- Marc Newsham (born 1987), English footballer
- Peter Newsham, chief of the Metropolitan Police Department of the District of Columbia
- Richard Newsham (died 1743), English inventor
- Tim Newsham, computer security professional

== See also ==
- Little Newsham, a village in County Durham, England
- Neasham, a village in County Durham, England
- Newham (disambiguation)
