= -hay (place name element) =

Place-name word-ending

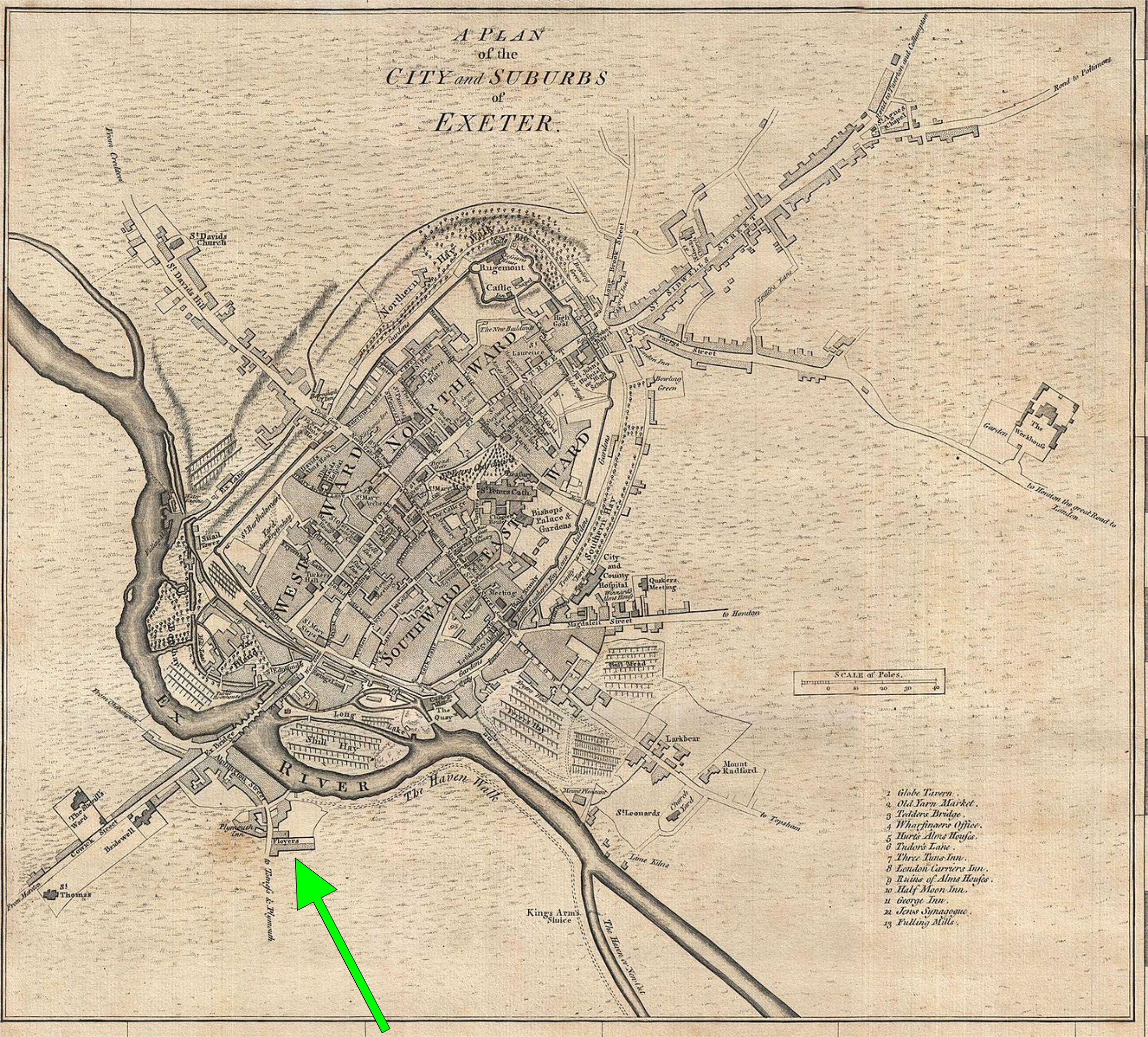
Floyer Hayes shown on a 1765 map of the City of Exeter, Devon, by Benjamin Donn. Many open spaces around the outside of the City walls are shown as suffixed "Hay", such as Shill Hay, Southern Hay, Northern Hay, Fryers Hay, Bon Hay

-hay (also hays, hayes, etc.) is a place-name word-ending common in England. It derives from the Old English word hege or haga, Middle English heie, in Icelandic hagi, meaning "an enclosed field", and is from the same root as the English word "hedge", a structure which surrounds and encloses an area of land, from the Norman-French haie, "a hedge". Haw (from O.E. haga) and Hay (from O.E. hege) are cognate and both mean "hedge".

== Examples ==
- Cheslyn Hay, Walsall, meaning "a fenced or hedged enclosure", here perhaps around an ancient cromlech or burial-mound.
- Pipe Hayes ("hedges"), Erdington.

=== Derbyshire ===
In the vicinity of Derbyshire:

- Floyer Hayes
- Cotmanhay
- Idridgehay
- Lower Hartshay
- Marehay
- Parsley Hay
- The Findern Hays
- Upper Hartshay

=== Devon ===
==== Exeter ====
In the vicinity of Exeter:

- Floyer Hayes
- Northern Hay
- Southern Hay
- Shill Hay
- Fryers Hay
- Bon Hay
- Princesshay

==== Tiverton ====
In the vicinity of Tiverton:

- Moor Hayes, Cullompton
- Passmore Hayes
- Buck Hayes
- Rashleigh Hayes
- Gorn Hay
- Wid Hayes
- Moor Hayes, Washfield

== See also ==
- Hayes (surname), sometimes derived from this topological source

== Sources ==
- Johnston, Rev. James B., The Place-Names of England and Wales, London, 1915, p. 147
