= Newham (disambiguation) =

Newham is a London borough.

Newham may also refer to:

== Places ==
- Newham, Lincolnshire, a location in the United Kingdom
- Newham, Belsay, now in Belsay parish, Northumberland, England
- Newham, Ellingham, Northumberland, England; see Newham railway station
- Newham, Cornwall, a mainly industrial area in Truro, Cornwall, England
- Newham, Victoria, Australia
- Coulby Newham, Middlesbrough, North Yorkshire, England
- Newham (electoral division), Greater London Council

== People with the surname ==
- Billy Newham (1860–1944), English cricketer
- Cameron Newham (born 1965), Australian-British photographer
- Edgar Newham (1914–1995), Australian rugby league footballer
- Jessica Anne Newham (born 1991), an Australian singer and songwriter known by her stage name Betty Who

== See also ==
- Newnham (disambiguation)
- Newsham (disambiguation)
