= Winick =

Winick is a surname. Notable people with the surname include:

- Bruce Winick (born 1944), American lawyer and academic
- Gary Winick (1961–2011), American film director and producer
- Herman Winick (born 1932), American physicist
- Judd Winick (born 1970), American writer

== See also ==
- Winnick
