= Tre- (place name element) =

British toponymic prefix

Tre- or tref- is a place name element of Celtic origin meaning "hamlet, farmstead, estate", etc. which survives mainly in Cornwall, Wales and Brittany.

The Cornish place-name beginning Tre- may be compared to the Cornish place-name beginning Bod- and the place-name endings -worthy and -cot in Devon, and -ham and -tun / -ton throughout England.

In a study by Oliver Padel of surviving place names in South-west England starting with "Tre-", including cities, towns, villages, hamlets, and individual farms, he found that almost all were situated west of the River Tamar, the natural border between Cornwall and Devon, with just a small concentration on the north-east side in Devon, near the narrower, shallower source area of the River. Padel reached two possible explanations: either Tre- names were formed at a date later than the Anglo-Saxon settlement of Devon, or Tre- names existing in Devon were superseded by new names following the Anglo-Saxon settlement of Devon (probably 7th to 8th centuries). He concluded that the striking boundary line was evidence of political and linguistic distinction at some time from the 8th to 11th centuries.

== See also ==
- Tre, Pol and Pen
- List of generic forms in place names in Ireland and the United Kingdom
