= Cregganbaun =

Village in County Mayo, Ireland

Cregganbaun An Creagán Bán
- Village
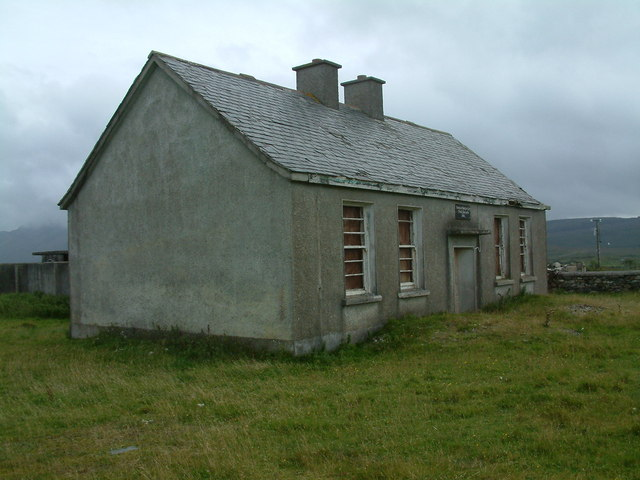
- Cregganbaun School

- Location in Ireland
- Coordinates: 53°42′00″N 9°48′27″W
- Country: Ireland
- Province: Connacht
- County: County Mayo
- Elevation: 57 m (187 ft)
- Time zone: UTC+0 (WET)
  - Summer (DST): UTC-1 (IST (WEST))
- Irish Grid Reference: L806737

Cregganbaun (Irish: An Creagán Bán) is a village in County Mayo, Ireland. It is 26 km by road from Westport along the R335.

== Education ==
Cregganbaun National School is now disused and local children travel to modern schools at Killeen or Louisburgh.

== See also ==
- List of towns and villages in Ireland
