= Tranmere =

Tranmere may refer to:

== Australia ==
- Tranmere, Tasmania, a suburb of Hobart
- Tranmere, South Australia, a suburb of Adelaide

== England ==
- Tranmere, Merseyside
  - Tranmere Rovers F.C., a football club
  - Tranmere Oil Terminal, a docking facility on the River Mersey
  - Tranmere railway station (1846–1857)

== See also ==
- Birkenhead and Tranmere (ward), an electoral division of Wirral Council
