= Loch Doire nam Mart =

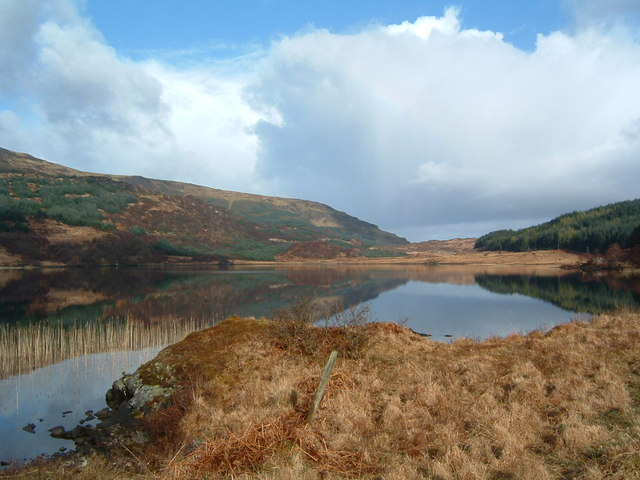

- Location within Highland
- Location: Morvern, Lochaber, Scotland
- Coordinates: 56.6069°N 5.8137°W
- Type: freshwater
- Primary inflows: Allt an Aoinaich Mhòir
- Primary outflows: Dig an Aoinidh
- Basin countries: Scotland
- Max. length: 1.06 km (0.66 mi)
- Max. width: 0.4 km (0.25 mi)
- Surface area: 27.3 ha (67 acres)
- Average depth: 6.4 m (21 ft)
- Max. depth: 15 m (49 ft)
- Water volume: 1,900,000 m^{3} (67,000,000 ft^{3})
- Shore length^{1}: 2.3 km (1.4 mi)
- Surface elevation: 15 m (49 ft)
- ^{1} Shore length is not a well-defined measure.

Loch Doire nam Mart, also known as Loch Durinemart or Loch Durinemast, is a small, lowland, freshwater loch on the Ardtornish Estate on the Morvern peninsula in the Scottish Highlands. It lies in a northwest to southeast direction approximately 5.6 km (3.5 mi) to the north west of Loch Aline. It is 1.06 km (0.66 mi) long and 0.4 km (0.25 mi) wide, and is at an altitude of 15 m (49 ft). It drains into Loch Arienas which lies approximately 200 m (660 ft) to the southeast. The average depth is 6.4 m (21 ft) and its maximum depth is 15 m (49 ft). The loch was surveyed on 18 August 1904 by James Murray as part of Sir John Murray's Bathymetrical Survey of Fresh-Water Lochs of Scotland 1897-1909.

The loch holds native wild brown trout and permits are required to fish the loch.
