= Dundrum =

Dundrum (from Dún Droma, Irish for 'ridge fort') may refer to:

== Places ==
=== Republic of Ireland ===
- Dundrum, Dublin, a suburb of Dublin city
- Dundrum, County Tipperary, a village

=== Northern Ireland ===
- Dundrum, County Down, a village
  - Dundrum Bay, next to the County Down village
- Dundrum, County Armagh, a townland; see List of townlands of County Armagh

== Other uses ==
- Dundrum Castle, in the County Down village
- Dundrum meteorite, fell near the County Tipperary village
- Dundrum Town Centre, a shopping centre in the Dublin suburb
