= Strathmore =

Strathmore may refer to:

== Organizations ==
- Strathmore (Maryland), an arts foundation in North Bethesda, U.S.
- Strathmore School, in Nairobi, Kenya
- Strathmore University, in Nairobi, Kenya
  - Strathmore Business School
  - Strathmore Law School

== Places ==
=== Australia ===
- Strathmore, Queensland
- Strathmore Station, near Croydon in Queensland, Australia
- Strathmore Homestead, near Collinsville in Queensland, Australia
- Strathmore, Victoria, a suburb of Melbourne, Australia
- Strathmore railway station, Essendon, Melbourne, Australia

=== Scotland ===
- Strathmore (ward), Perth and Kinross
- Strathmore, Sutherland, a valley in northern Scotland
- Valley of Strathmore, in east central Scotland

=== United States ===
- Strathmore, California
- Strathmore, New Jersey
- Strathmore, New York
- Strathmore, Syracuse, New York

=== Other places ===
- Strathmore, Alberta, Canada
  - Strathmore (D.J. Murray) Airport
  - Strathmore (Appleton Field) Aerodrome
- Strathmore (Killiney), a mansion in Dún Laoghaire–Rathdown, Ireland
- Strathmore, New Zealand
- Strathmore Park, or Strathmore, a suburb of Wellington, New Zealand

== Sport ==
- Strathmore F.C. (Arbroath), a former football club in Scotland
- Strathmore F.C. (Dundee), a former football club in Scotland
- Strathmore Football Club, an Australian rules football club
- Strathmore RFC, a rugby union club in Forfar, Scotland

== Other uses ==
- Strathmore (play), an 1849 play by John Westland Marston
- RMS Strathmore, a British ship 1935–1969
- Strathmore (ship), British ship in the 1870s
- Strathmore Mineral Water, produced by A.G. Barr
- Trevor Strathmore, a character in the novel Digital Fortress

== See also ==
- Strath, a large valley
- Earl of Strathmore and Kinghorne, a title in the Peerage of Scotland and the Peerage of the UK
