= Merton (surname) =

Merton is a surname of English origin. Notable people with the surname include:

- Alice Merton (born 1993), German singer-songwriter
- Don Merton (1939–2011), New Zealand conservationist
- Ernst Merton (1848–1920), American politician and lawyer
- Hugo Merton (1879–1940), German zoologist
- Paul Merton (born 1957), British actor and comedian
- Robert C. Merton (born 1944), American Nobel Prize–winning economist
- Robert K. Merton (1910–2003), American sociologist, father of Robert C. Merton
- Thomas Merton (1915–1968), American Cistercian monk, social activist and author
- Sir Thomas Ralph Merton KBE FRS (1888–1969), British physicist and art collector
- Walter de Merton (c. 1205 – 1277), Bishop of Rochester, England and founder of Merton College
- William "Bill" Ralph Merton (1917–2004), British military scientist and merchant banker
- William Ralph Merton (1848–1916), German entrepreneur, founder of the University of Frankfurt and Metallgesellschaft AG
- Zachary Merton (1843–1915), Anglo-German industrialist and philanthropist
