= Winnicki =

Winnicki (feminine: Winnicka, plural: Winniccy) is a surname. It may refer to:

- Innocenty Winnicki (1654–1700), Ukrainian bishop
- Jacek Winnicki (born 1967), Polish basketball coach
- Lucyna Winnicka (1928–2013), Polish actress
- Robert Winnicki (born 1985), Polish politician
- Tomasz Winnicki (chemist) (born 1934), Polish chemist
- Tomasz Winnicki (political activist) (born 1975), Canadian white supremacist
