= Wykebeck =

Suburb of Leeds, West Yorkshire, England

Coordinates: 53.802°N 1.485°W

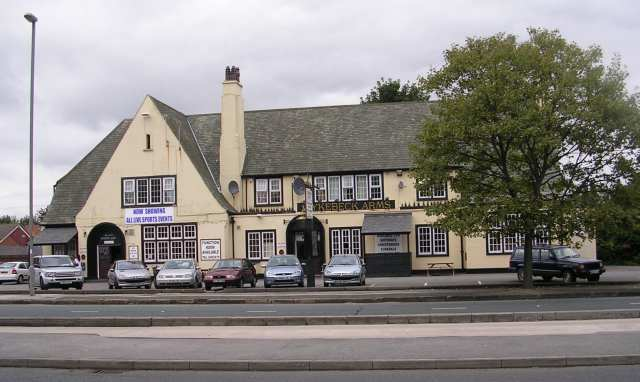
Wykebeck Arms

Wykebeck is an area of east Leeds, West Yorkshire, England named after the Wyke Beck and situated between Gipton and Seacroft along Wykebeck Road. The area falls within the Gipton and Harehills ward of the Leeds City Council. The area is seldom referred to; instead, people usually perceive Gipton to be West of the beck and Seacroft to be East of it. The area consists of several blocks of highrise council flats to the south.

Wykebeck Valley Road runs through the area, from York Road (A64) to Foundry Lane. Wykebeck Valley walking way passes to the north of the area.

== Schools ==
Wykebeck Primary School is on Brander Street.
