= Winnik =

Winnik is a surname. Notable people with the surname include:

- Daniel Winnik (born 1985), Canadian ice hockey player
- Françoise Winnik (1952–2021), French and Canadian chemist
