= The Merton =

Housing estate in Kennedy Town, Hong Kong

Coordinates: 22.2832°N 114.1264°E

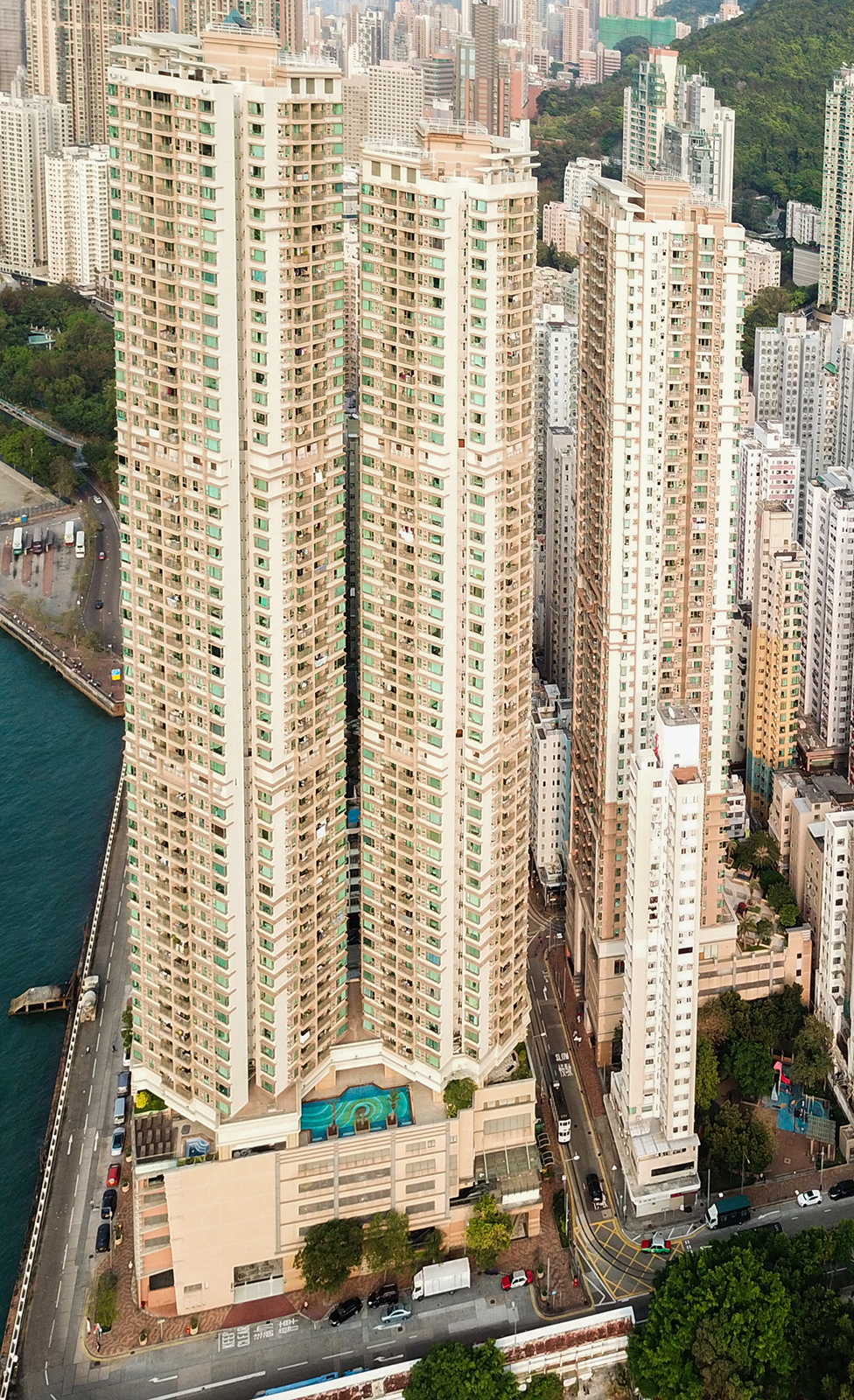
The Merton

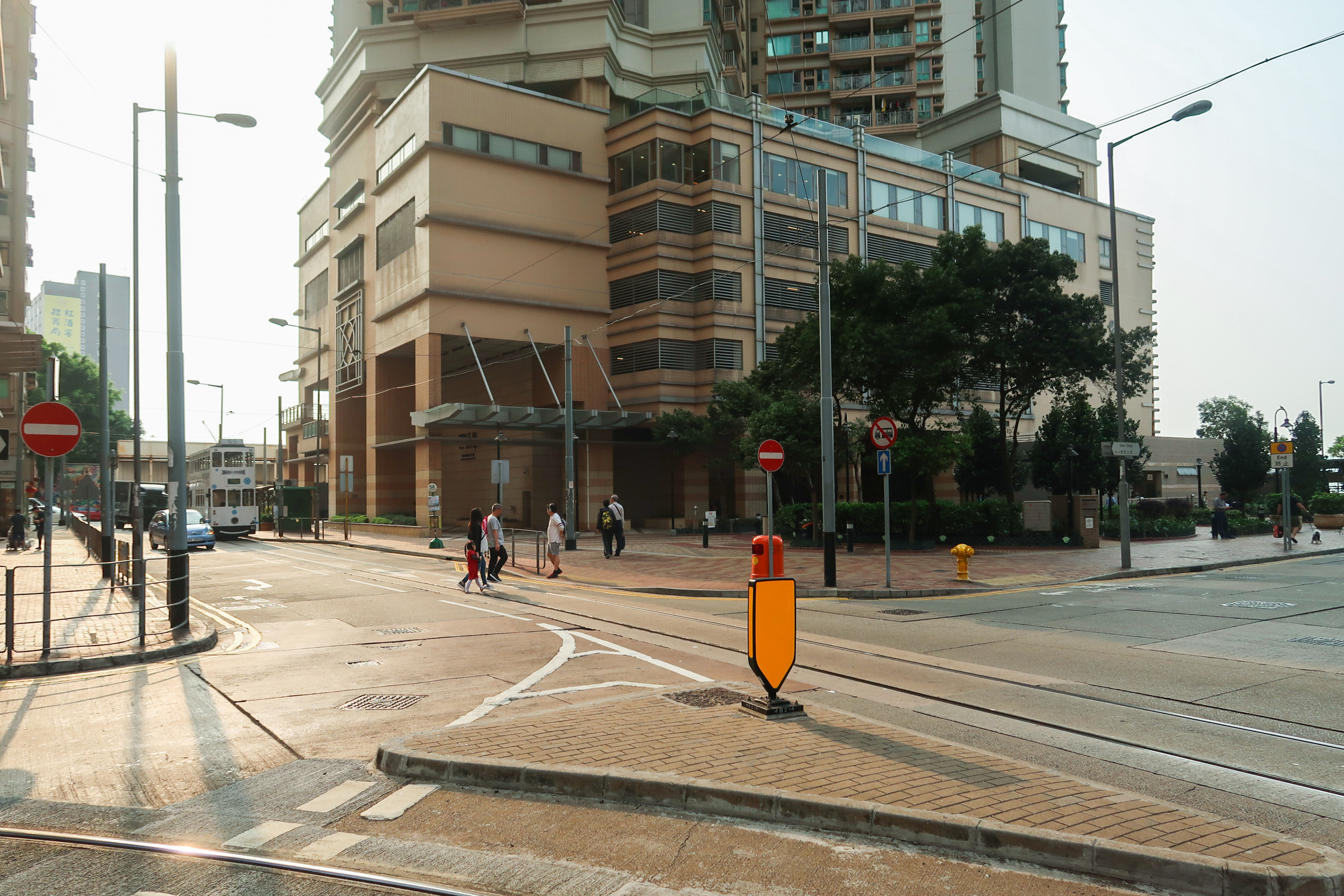
The Merton

The Merton (Chinese: 泓都) is a high-rise development located in Kennedy Town supplying 1,182 units in total, Hong Kong. The complex consists of three towers. The Merton 1 rises 59 floors and 197 metres (646 ft), and stands as the 60th-tallest building in territory. The Merton 2 and The Merton 3 rise 51 floors and 180 metres (591 ft), and stand as the 100th-tallest buildings in the territory; the two structures are tied in rank with the Sham Wan Towers and Liberté 5 and 6. The complex, composed entirely of residential units, was designed by architectural firm Ronald Lu & Partners and developed by New World Development. Construction began in 1998 and completed in 2005.

The complex has a club house in each of the three towers, comprising a swimming pool, gymnasium, yoga and aerobics rooms, reading room, indoor kids playing area, steam room, and sauna.

== Buildings of the complex ==
Name	Height (m)	Height (ft)	Floor count
The Merton 1	197	646	59
The Merton 2	180	591	51
The Merton 3	180	591	51

== Neighborhood ==
Several scenic walks such as the Mount Davis Trail start a few minutes of walking distance from the complex. There are several bars and eateries within walking distance of The Merton. The Merton is a few minutes walk to both Cadogan Temporary Playground and Forbes Playground. The Smithfield wet market is a 6-minute walk from the complex.

The Kennedy Town MTR station is about 5 minutes walk from the complex. The station is situated at the end of the Island line, and is 4 stations (10 minutes) away from the Central station.

== See also ==
- List of tallest buildings in Hong Kong
- New Praya, Kennedy Town
- Davis Street
