= Scottish toponymy =

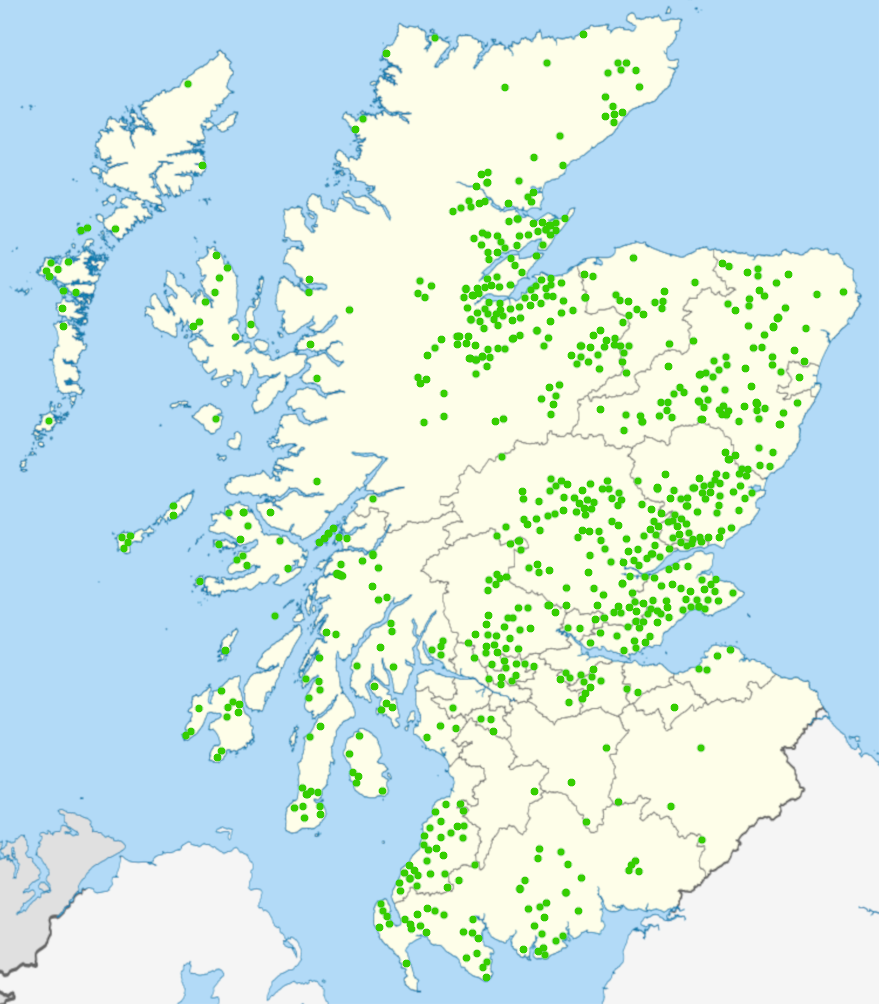
Place names in Scotland that contain the element BAL- from the Scottish Gaelic 'baile' meaning home, farmstead, town or city. This data gives some indication of the extent of medieval Gaelic settlement in Scotland.

Scottish toponymy derives from the languages of Scotland. The toponymy varies in each region, reflecting the linguistic history of each part of the country.

Goidelic roots accounts for most place-names in eastern Scotland, with a few Anglic names in Fife and Angus and with a small number Pictish elements assimilated into the total toponymy.

Nearly every place-name in the Northern Isles has Norse roots (see Norn language and Scandinavian toponymy), as do many in the Western Isles and along the coasts of the mainland.

In the Scottish Highlands, the names are primarily from Scottish Gaelic, with emphasis on natural features; elements such as Glen- (Gaelic: Gleann, valley) and Inver- (Gaelic: Inbhir, confluence, mouth) are common. Some Gaelic elements may themselves also be ultimately of Pictish or Brythonic origin, such as Obar (Aber-, meaning confluence; cf modern Welsh Aber-) and Srath (Strath-, a wide, shallow river valley; cf modern Welsh Ystrad).

In lowland Scotland, names are of more diverse origin. Many are Gaelic, but many also derive from the Brythonic branch of Celtic languages (such as Lanark). There are also a substantial number of place names, particularly in the east lowlands, derived from the northern dialect of Old English (see Northumbrian Old English) and later Modern Scots. For example, -dale as used in e.g. Tweeddale, is from Old English. Norse place-names are also common in Dumfriesshire and Galloway.

== Places in Scotland where the Gaelic and English placenames appear to differ ==
This is a list of names which are not cognate, i.e. they are not from the same root or origins. Some names which appear unrelated in fact are; for example the name Falkirk ultimately derives from a calque (i.e. a word-for-word translation) of its Gaelic name An Eaglais Bhreac (literally 'the speckled/variegated church').

| English name | Scottish Gaelic name | Notes |
|---|---|---|
| Alexandria | Magh Leamhna | The Gaelic name refers to the Plain of Leven, or the Lennox. |
| Applecross | A' Chomraich | The English is a corruption of an Aber- name. |
| Bearsden | Cille Phàdraig Ùr | Former name "Kilpatrick". |
| Beauly | A' Mhanachainn | Gaelic name means "The Monastery", referring to Beauly Priory. |
| Bishopbriggs | Coille Dobhair | Former name "Cadder". |
| Bo'ness | Ceann an Fhàil | Bo'ness is short for Borrowstounness; former name "Kinneil". |
| Cairngorms | Am Monadh Ruadh | English name for the range derived from Cairn Gorm, single mountain. |
| Cairnryan | Machair an Sgithich | "Carn Rioghainne" is also seen occasionally in Gaelic. |
| Campbeltown | Ceann Loch Chille Chiarain | Gaelic means "Head of Loch Kilkerran", and is often shortened to "Ceann Locha". Loch Kilkerran is an antiquated name for Campbeltown Loch. |
| The Cobbler | Beinn Artair | "Ben Arthur" is in occasional use in English too. |
| Dingwall | Inbhir Pheofharain | The English name comes from the Norse for a local parliament, while the Gaelic refers to the local river. |
| Dufftown | Baile Bhainidh | A translation of the English is occasionally used. |
| Flowerdale | Am Baile Mòr | Gaelic name means "The Large Farm". |
| Fort Augustus | Cille Chuimein | Formerly "Kiliwhimin". |
| Fort William | An Gearasdan | Gaelic name means "The Garrison". "Inverlochy" is used for the general area. |
| Fortrose | A' Chananaich | Name translates to "Canonry". Formerly called "Chanonry". |
| Holywood | Doire Chonaill | Former name "Dercongal". |
| Kincardineshire | A' Mhaorainn | Also known as "The Mearns". |
| Laurencekirk | Coinmheadh | Former name "Conveth". A translation of the English is in occasional use. |
| Leverburgh | An t-Òb | English name derived from Lord Leverhulme; formerly "Obbe". |
| Linlithgow | Gleann Iucha | These names may be etymologically linked, and refer to the loch in the town. |
| Lochnagar | Beinn Chìochan | The Gaelic name refers to the mountain; the English name comes from an adjacent loch. |
| River Forth | An Abhainn Dubh | Gaelic name means "The Black River". |
| Rothesay | Baile Bhòid | Gaelic name means "town of Bute". |
| South Queensferry | Cas Chaolais | "Caschillis" is an old form. A translation of the English name is sometimes used. |
| St Kilda | Hiort | Main island is often called Hirta. Origin of both names is unclear. |
| Tain | Baile Dhubhthaich | Gaelic name refers to Saint Duthac, the English to the River Tain. |
| Troon | An Truthail | Gaelic name means "The Thrush". |
| Wishaw | Camas Neachdain | From Gaelic "Camas", meaning bend/meander and Neachdain, which could refer to several historical or mythological figures. See also - Cambusnethan. |

== See also ==
- Acarsaid
- Ainmean-Àite na h-Alba
- Albania (placename)
- Celtic onomastics
- Celtic toponymy
- Dun (fortification)
- Etymology of Aberdeen
- Etymology of Edinburgh
- Etymology of Scotland
- Etymology of Skye
- Geography of Scotland
- History of Scotland
- Irish toponymy
- List of places in Scotland
- List of Scottish Gaelic place names
- Scottish Gaelic personal naming system
- Scottish place names in other countries
- Scottish Place-Name Society
- Shieling
- Toponymy in the United Kingdom and Ireland
- Welsh toponymy
