= Loch Buidhe =

Loch Buidhe (from the Gaelic for yellow loch) may refer to a number of lochs in Scotland:

- Loch Buidhe, Bonar Bridge, Sutherland
- Loch Buidhe, Tongue, Sutherland
- Loch Buidhe, Altnaharra, Sutherland
- Loch Buidhe, Rannoch Moor
- Loch Buidhe, Skye
- Loch Buidhe, Glen Muick, Aberdeenshire

== See also ==
- Loch Buie, sea loch south of Mull
- Lochbuie, Mull (a settlement next to the loch)
- Lochbuie, Colorado, United States
- MV Loch Buie, a Caledonian Macbrayne ferry
