= Keld =

Keld may refer to:

- Keld, Cumbria, England
- Keld, North Yorkshire, England
- Variation of Kjell (name), a Danish given name
- KELD (AM), a radio station (1400 AM) licensed to El Dorado, Arkansas, United States
- KELD-FM, a radio station (106.5 FM) licensed to Hampton, Arkansas, United States
- the ICAO code for South Arkansas Regional Airport at Goodwin Field
