= Hythe Venetian Fete =

Event in Hythe, Kent, England

The Hythe Venetian Fete is a traditional "floating tableaux" (water carnival) that dates and derives back to the 1860s Hythe Cricket Week. It takes place on the third Wednesday in August, every two years, on the Royal Military Canal at Hythe in Kent, England.

The competitive fete is largely sponsored by local businesses and media (some of which have their own themed floats) and also features related entertainments, refreshments, band concerts, and fireworks throughout the evening illuminated variation.
