= Willaston =

Willaston could be

- Willaston, Cheshire East, England
- Willaston, Cheshire West, England
- Willaston, Flintshire, Wales
- Willaston, Isle of Man, a suburb of Douglas, Isle of Man
- Willaston, Oxfordshire, a lost settlement in the parish of Hethe
- Willaston, Shropshire, a hamlet in Ightfield
- Willaston, South Australia
