= Folkestone and Hythe =

Folkestone and Hythe can refer to:

- Folkestone and Hythe District
- Folkestone and Hythe (UK Parliament constituency)
