= New Row =

Hamlet in Ceredigion, Wales

Coordinates: 52.343419°N 3.868161°W

New Row: Welsh: Rhes Newydd
- Location within Ceredigion
- OS grid reference: SN 7283 7335
  - Cardiff: 66.5 mi (107.0 km)
  - London: 169.5 mi (272.8 km)
- Community: Pontarfynach
- Principal area: Ceredigion
- Country: Wales
- Sovereign state: United Kingdom
- Post town: Tregaron
- Postcode district: SY25
- Police: Dyfed-Powys
- Fire: Mid and West Wales
- Ambulance: Welsh
- UK Parliament: Ceredigion Preseli
- Senedd Cymru – Welsh Parliament: Ceredigion

New Row (Welsh: Rhes Newydd) is a hamlet in the community of Pontarfynach, Ceredigion, Wales, which is 66.5 miles (107 km) from Cardiff and 169.5 miles (272.7 km) from London. New Row is represented in the Senedd by Elin Jones (Plaid Cymru) and is part of the Ceredigion Preseli constituency in the House of Commons.

== See also ==
- List of localities in Wales by population
