= Hythe railway station =

Hythe railway station may refer to the following railway stations in England:

- Hythe railway station (Romney, Hythe and Dymchurch Railway), a terminus in Hythe, Kent, on the Romney, Hythe and Dymchurch Railway.
- Hythe railway station (South Eastern Railway), a closed station in Hythe, Kent, on the SER main line's former branch line from Sandling to Sandgate.
- Hythe railway station (Essex) on the Sunshine Coast Line Railway.
- Hythe railway station (Hampshire) on the closed branch line from Totton to Fawley.
- Hythe Road railway station, a proposed railway station in West London.
- the pair of stations on the 2 foot gauge railway that forms part of the Hythe Pier, Railway and Ferry in Hampshire.
