= Tiverton =

Tiverton most often refers to:

- Tiverton, Devon, a town in England

Tiverton may also refer to:

== Canada ==
- Tiverton, Ontario, a village
- Tiverton, Nova Scotia, a village known for its "Balancing Rock"

== United Kingdom ==
- Tiverton, Cheshire, a village
- Tiverton (UK Parliament constituency), 1621–1997
  - Tiverton and Honiton (UK Parliament constituency), 1997-2024.
  - Tiverton and Minehead (UK Parliament constituency), since 2024, present day successor to the above.

== United States ==
- Tiverton, Rhode Island, a New England town
  - Tiverton (CDP), Rhode Island, a census-designated place comprising the urban portion of the town

== Name ==
- Tiverton Preedy (1863–1928), English clergyman
