= Clonbeith Castle =

Castle in North Ayrshire, Scotland

- Auchentiber, North Ayrshire, Scotland; UK
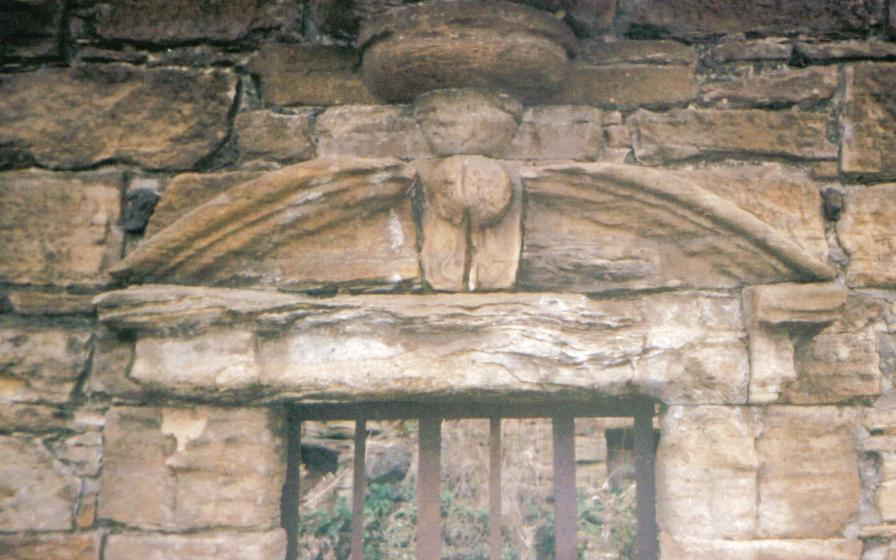
- The front entrance of Clonbeith Castle showing ashlar and freestone on what may have once been a harled surface.

Site information
- Owner: Clonbeith Farm
- Controlled by: Cunningham clan
- Open to the public: Private
- Condition: Ruined

Location
- Shown within Scotland
- Coordinates: 55°40′30″N 04°38′38″W
- Grid reference: grid reference NS338455

Site history
- Built: 17th century
- In use: Until 18th century
- Materials: stone

The Castle of Clonbeith is in the old feudal Baillerie of Cunninghame, near Auchentiber, on a sideroad off the B778, in what is now North Ayrshire, Scotland.

== Structure ==
It was a simple oblong mansion, about 40 by 23 feet (12 by 7 metres) with walls 2 1/2 ft (75 cm) thick. The ground floor was vaulted and the entrance was central, leading into a passage with a straight staircase branching off to the right up to the first floor hall. A wheel-stair in a square chamber led to the upper floors. The hall was lit by windows in three of the walls and had a large fireplace on one side, and a circular bow window on the opposite side, boldly projected on a series of corbels (see photograph). The Renaissance style door bears the date 1607. The name "Clonbeith" is said to be derived from the Celtic words "Cluan" (grazing land) and "Beithe" (birch).

== Lairds of Clonbeith ==
Given as "Klonbyith" by Pont in the 1690s it was then the property of William Cunningham, scion of this cadet branch of the Glencairn Cuninghames through those of Aiket Castle. He was married to Agnes who died in 1612.

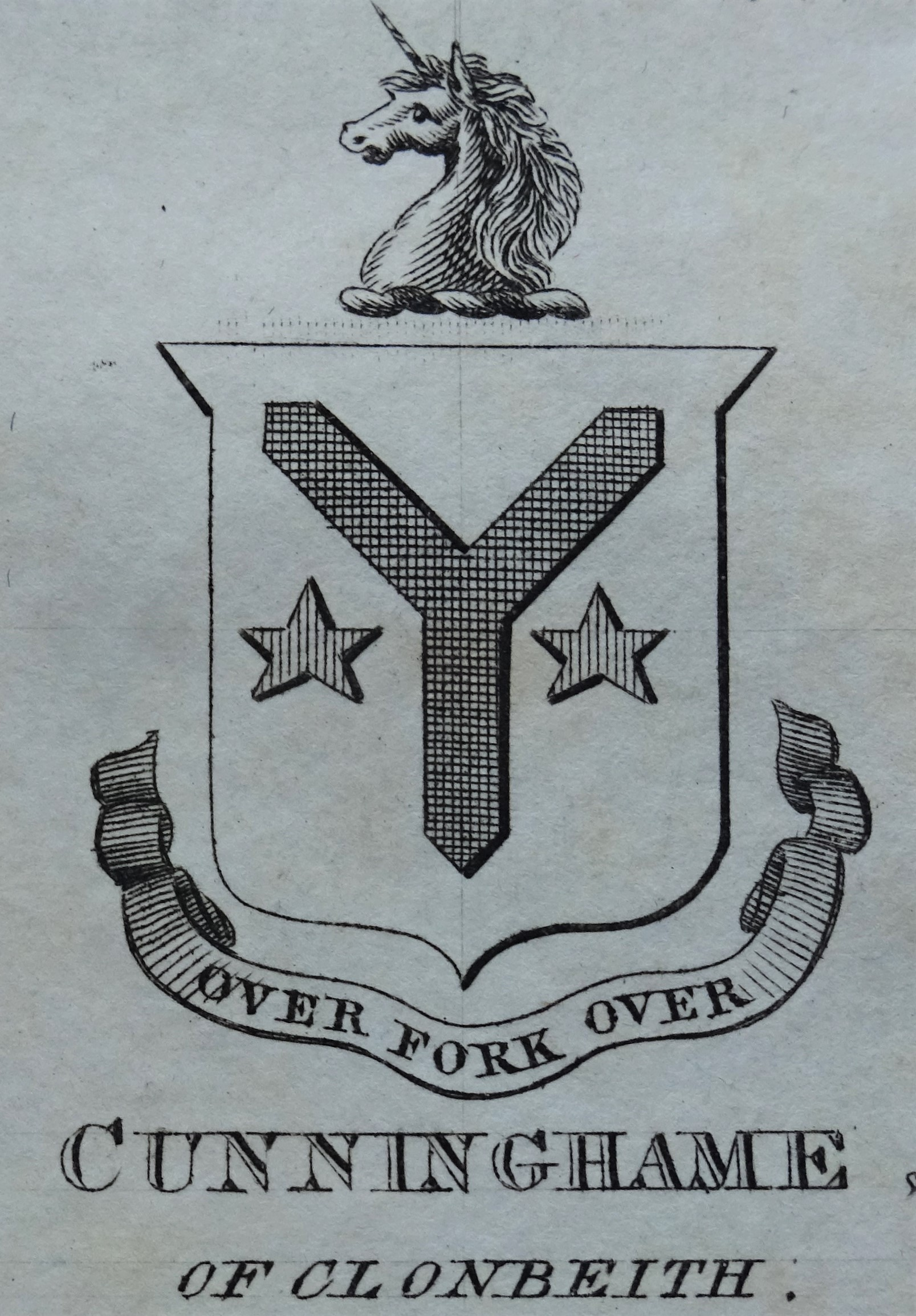
Cunningham of Clonbeith coat of arms

In 1691 the Hearth Tax records show that "Clonbeith House" had five hearths and nineteen other dwellings were associated with the house. Alexander Cuningham (sic) is said to have assaulted a professor in the College gardens at Glasgow and was forced to make an open acknowledgment of his faults in front of an assembly of his friends.

Together with around thirty other participants, it was John Cuningham shot and killed, the coup de gras, Hugh, the fourth Earl of Eglinton in 1586 and was caught hiding in a chimney at Hamilton Palace and was "cut to pieces" by Robert, brother to Hugh and his supporters. Robert in the language of the time is said to have "honourably revenged" his brother's death, killing John Cunningham, in Hamilton, possibly at Hamilton palace.

James Cunningham of Clonbeith and Darnmuyle (1581) was the father of John Cunningham of Corsehill.

Robertson points out that the various branches of the family spell their name differently; as Cunningham for Baidland and Clonbeith, Cunninghame for Glencairn and Corsehill, Cuninghame for Caddel and Monkredding, and finally Cuningham for Glengarnock. The Cunninghams of Clonbeith are usually referred to as being of "Clonbeith and Darnmyule", with Darmule being nearer Kilwinning.

Daniel Cunningham, whose wife was Mary Wallace, with the consent of his son William, sold the property to James Scott, Provost of Irvine in 1633. In 1691 Walter, brother of James, sold the lands to Patrick Warner, Minister of Irvine.

William Cunninghams wife was Jean; in 1717 a reference is made to a George Cunningham of Clonbeith.

In 1698 the Monkredding estate was sold to Hugh Cuninghame of Clonbeith, Writer to the Signet, and became the family seat.

== Stories ==
=== Lady of Clonbeith ===
The "Leddy o'Clumbeith" is a ghost story told by Dr. Duguid in the 1820s. A servant girl from the farm of Clonbeith was making her way to the Blair Tavern to keep a tryst when she fell into a mine shaft, horse and all, and was killed. Others say that her "lad" killed her and then jumped into the shaft after her. Her ghost is said to haunt the fields around Auchentiber.

=== Lady in the Peat ===
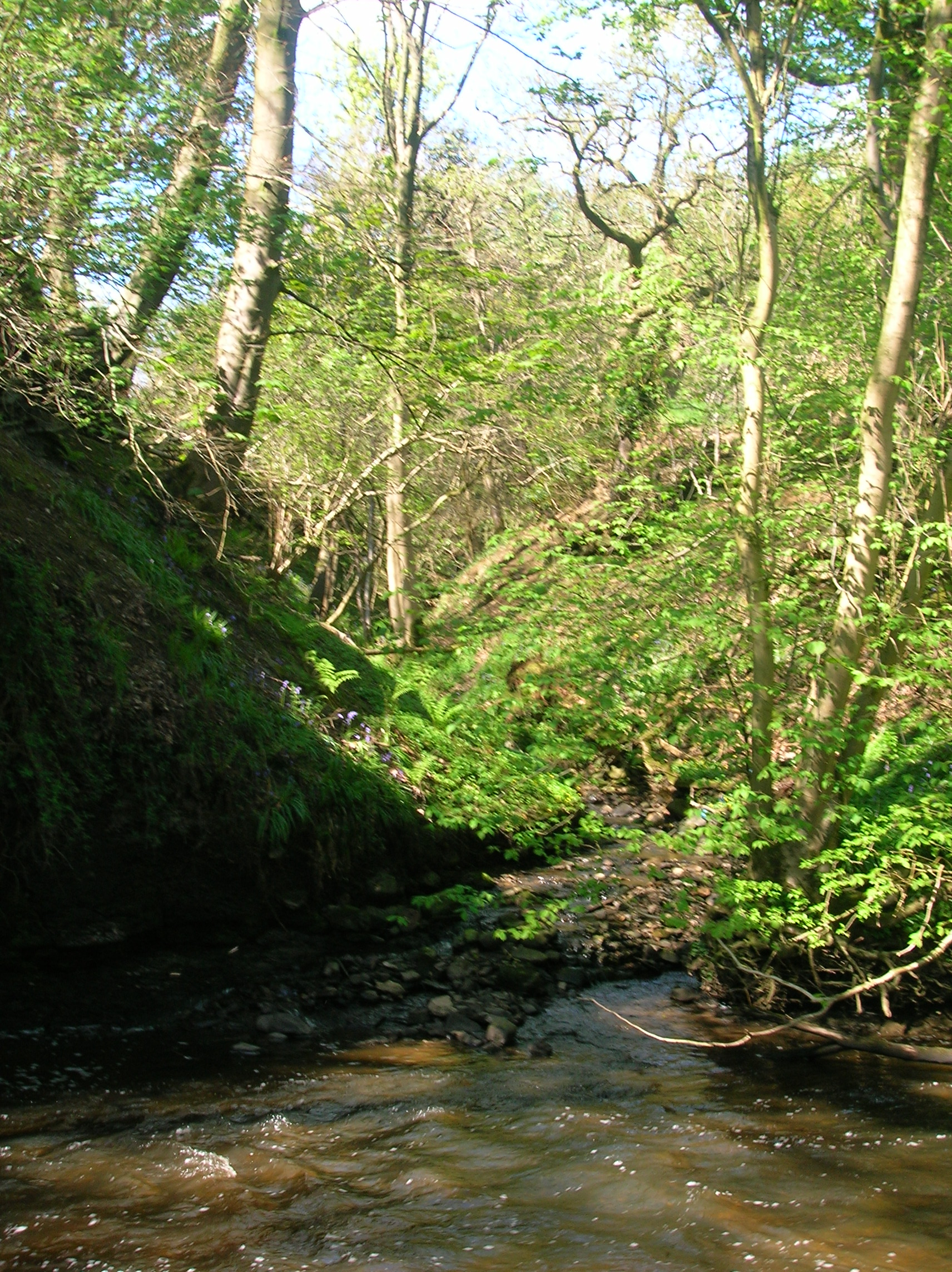
The Cowlinn Burn joining the Lugton Water at Montgreenan Castle.

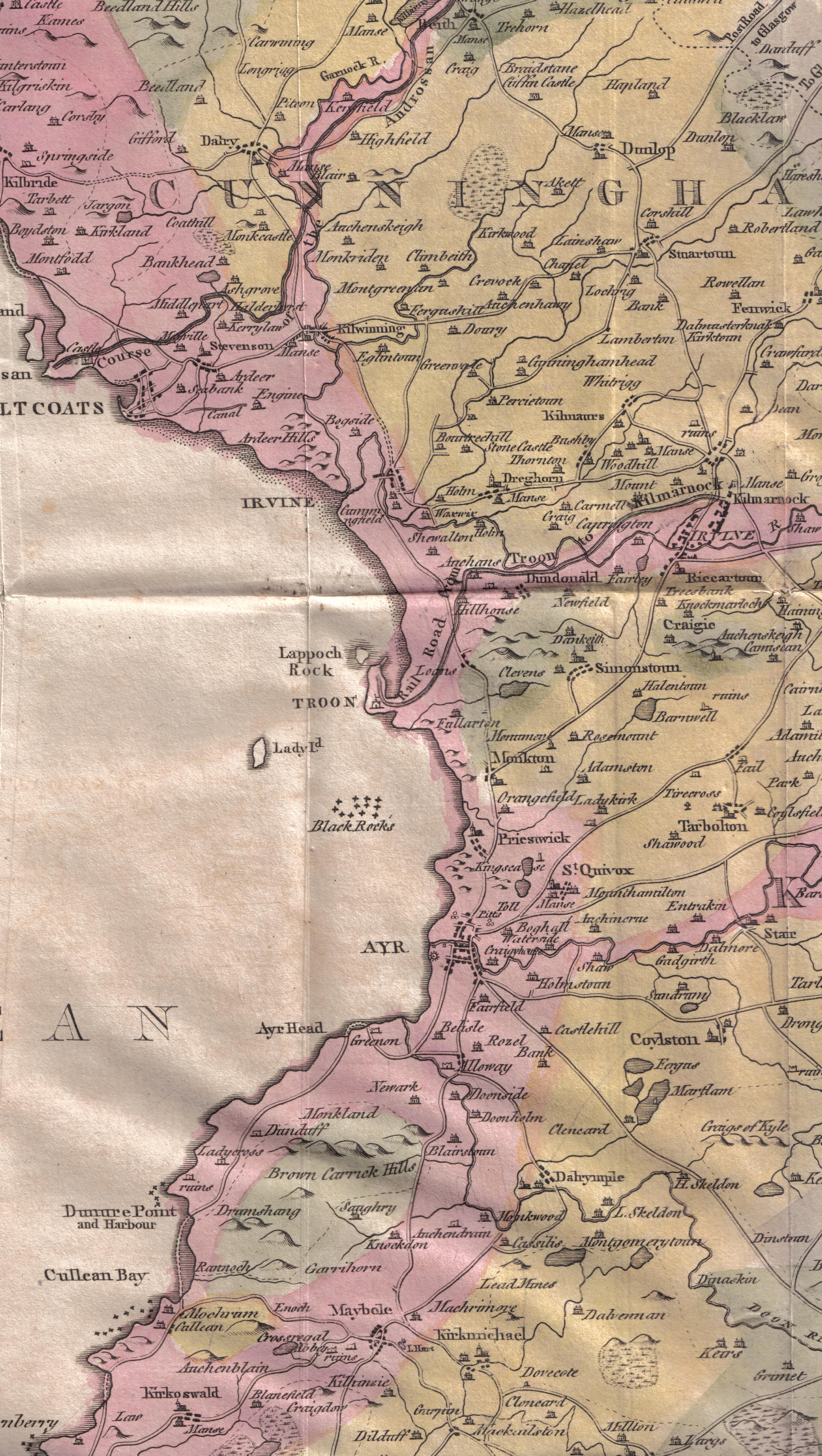
William Aiton's 1811 map showing 'Climbeith.'

Dr. Duguid in around the 1840s records that near Clumbeith (Clonbeith) on the way to "Meg'swa's" he met Pate Glunch cutting peats. Pate was normally a still, dour man, but on this occasion he was highly animated and took the doctor to see the long dead corpse of a "bonnie lady" lying in a hole in the peat. She was around 18 to 20 years of age, had rosy cheeks, a sweet smile playing around her lips and blonde hair. Her identity was unknown, but a rumour linked her to the family of Montgreenan.

== History ==
In around 1691 the Rev Patrick Warner, having purchased Clonbeith and likewise purchased Scott's lands in Irvine, went on to drain much of the "Loch of Irving" or Trindlemoss, later called Scott's Loch, after returning from exile in Holland.

The Cowlinn Burn runs down to join the Lugton Water at the site of Montgreenan castle or the Bishop's Palace. A dwelling called Cowlinn is marked on the Thomson's 1820 map and a Clonbeith Mill was nearby.

A limestone pit and workers row existed near the castle in the 19th century, providing a constant supply for the local limekilns.

A finely-shaped round and oval stone implement was found at Clonbeith or Clonkeith by Mr. Baird Kirkland in the 19th century.

== See also ==
- Barony of Peacockbank
- Lambroughton
- Corsehill
- Chapeltoun
- A Researcher's Guide to Local History terminology
