= Shankill =

Shankill may refer to various places in Ireland:

Northern Ireland

- Belfast Shankill (Northern Ireland Parliament constituency) (1929–1972)
- Belfast Shankill (UK Parliament constituency) (1918–1922)
- Shankill, County Antrim, a parish in County Antrim
- Shankill, County Armagh, a townland in County Armagh
- Shankill, County Down, a parish situated partly in Counties Down and Armagh
- Shankill, County Fermanagh, a townland in County Fermanagh
- Shankill Road, a road and electoral ward in West Belfast, passes through an area known as The Shankill

Republic of Ireland

- Shankill, County Roscommon, a civil parish in County Roscommon
- Shankill, Dublin, a suburb of Dublin in Dun Laoghaire-Rathdown
  - Shankill railway station, serving the suburb and Rathmichael
