= Penmaen =

Penmaen may refer to one of several places in Wales:

- Penmaen, Caerphilly
- Penmaen, Conwy, a township within the ancient parish of Llysfaen
- Penmaen, Swansea

See also:

- Penmaenmawr, Conwy County Borough
