= Druineach =

Element of place names in Highlands of Scotland

Druineach is a place-name element found in the northwest of the Highlands and Islands of Scotland. Although the exact etymology of the word is uncertain, it is a Gaelic term derived from Old Irish.

According to William Watson, in the Placenames of Ross and Cromarty, a "druineach" was:

”Somehow connected with druidh, glossed ‘glice’, wise or clever, and ‘druineach’ in Irish means an embroideress. The exact significance of it in our placenames is far from clear.”

Logan in Scottish Gael takes it to mean cultivators of the soil, as opposed to hunters., which may represent a genuine tradition.

Martin Martin makes mention of little round houses in Skye, capable of containing only one person and called “Tey-nan-druinich” (i.e. an anglicised spelling of “Taigh nan Druinich”, house of the “Druineachs”). “Druineach” says Martin signifies a retired person, much given to contemplation. Comparisons perhaps can be drawn with the hermits of Tibet.

((Druineach) with minor additions and corrections)
