= Acomb =

Acomb may refer to:

== Places ==
=== England, United Kingdom ===
==== Villages ====
- Acomb, Northumberland
- Acomb, North Yorkshire

==== Churches ====
- Our Lady's Church, Acomb
- St Stephen's Church, Acomb
- St James the Deacon's Church, Acomb Moor

==== Houses ====
- Acomb House, York
- Acomb House, Hexham
- Acomb High House, Hexham

== People ==
- Doug Acomb (born 1949), Canadian ice hockey player
- Patty Acomb (born 1965), American politician
- Frances Dorothy Acomb (1907–1984), American academic and historian

== Sport ==
- Acomb Stakes
- Acomb F. C.
