= Murton (surname) =

Murton is a surname. Notable people with the surname include:

- John Murton (theologian) (1585–c.1626), co-founder of the Baptist faith in Great Britain
- John Murton (footballer) (1942–2021), Australian rules footballer
- Lionel Murton (1915–2006), English-Canadian character actor
- Matt Murton (born 1981), American baseball player
- Oscar Murton (1914–2009), British politician
- Peter Murton (1924–2009), British film art director and production designer
- Phillip Murton (born 1973), Australian rules footballer
- Tom Murton (1928–1990), American penologist
- Walter Murton (born 1892), British art director known for his film set designs
