= Tunstead =

Tunstead may refer to:

- Tunstead, Derbyshire, England
- Tunstead, Greater Manchester, England
- Tunstead, Norfolk, England

== See also ==
- Tunstead Milton (in Derbyshire)
