= Floyer Hayes =

Historic manor in Devon, England

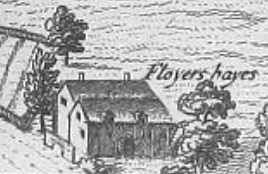
Floyer Hayes, detail from a 1617 map of the City of Exeter in the 6th volume of Civitates Orbis Terrarum by Georg Braun (1541-1622)

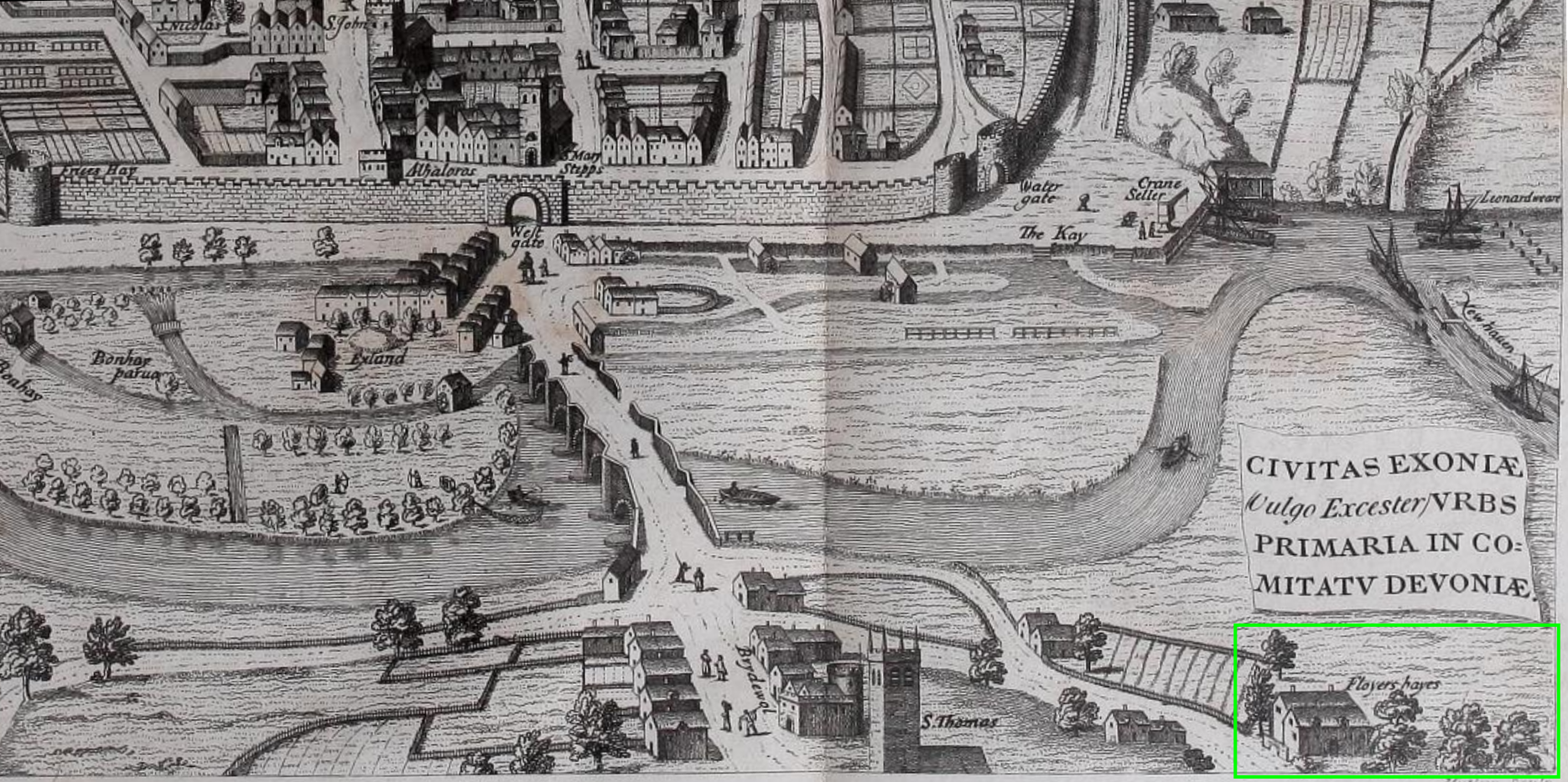
Floyer Hayes shown (bottom right) on 1617 map of the City of Exeter in the 6th volume of Civitates Orbis Terrarum by Georg Braun (1541-1622). St Thomas's Church at left (west)

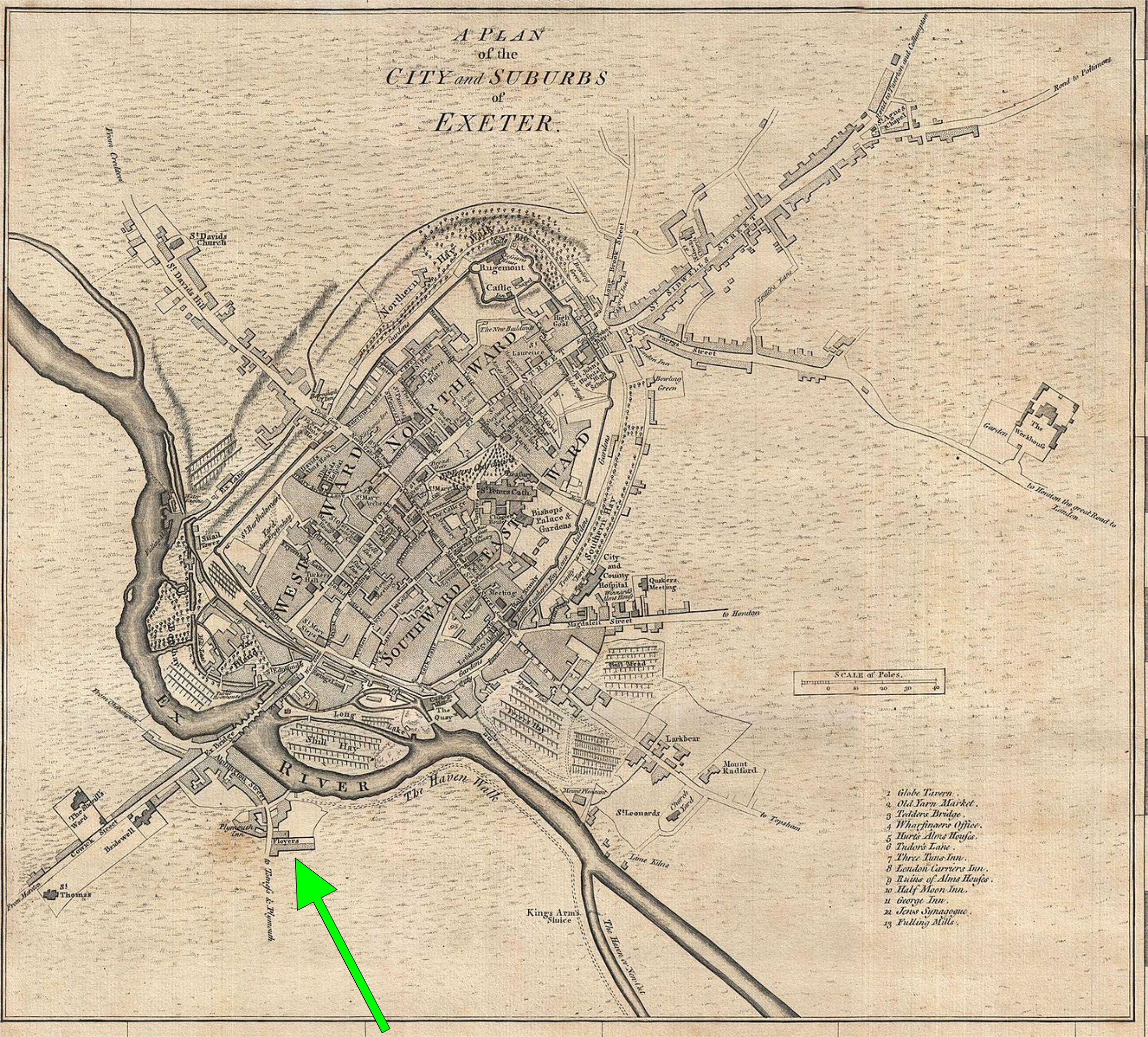
Floyer Hayes shown on a 1765 map of Exeter by Benjamin Donn, situated on the Alphington road on the south side of the River Exe

Floyer Hayes was an historic manor in the parish of St Thomas on the southern side of the City of Exeter in Devon, England, from which city it is separated by the River Exe. It took its name from the ancient family of Floyer which held it until the early 17th century, when it was sold to the Gould family. In the 19th century the estate was divided up and the manor house demolished. The parish church of St Thomas, situated a short distance to the west of the house, was burned down in 1645 during the Civil War, and was rebuilt before 1657. Thus no monuments survive there of early lords of the manor, namely the Floyer family.

== Location ==
No remains of the manor house survived beyond about 1830 or 1840. It stood set back a little way on the east side of the road from Exeter to Alphington, between the Haven Road and the railway viaduct, rather beyond what was known in 1898 as Sydney Place. The name "Flower Pot Buildings" may have been originally "Floyer's Plot." The land lies very low, and was intersected by streams by which mills are worked. A mill is mentioned as being on the manor of Floyer's Hayes in the time of Henry III (1216–1272). Many open spaces around the outside of the City walls are shown on the 1765 map of Exeter by Benjamin Donnas as suffixed "Hay", such as Shill Hay, Southern Hay, Northern Hay, Fryers Hay and Bon Hay. The manor house is shown on a 1573 map of Exeter as a building of large size, surrounded by a stone wall and entered beneath a large arched gateway. According to Worthy (1892), though mistaken: "It stood nearly in a line with "Snayle Tower", and on the west side of the river, and must have been very near the ancient priory of Cowick, but a little to the south-west of it". However, this was another large house, 'Hays Barton'. Worthy's assumption that near to that had stood the ancient priory, was also in error, since that had stood above the 50-foot contour beyond what is today 'Cowick Playing Fields' at Cowick Barton.

== Feudal tenure ==
Floyer Hayes is referred to in a Latin note to the Heralds' Visitation of Devon of 1564, preserved at the College of Arms. This indicates that before the 14th century the manor was a member of one of the feudal baronies of the Courtenay family, Earls of Devon, thus either of the feudal barony of Okehampton or the feudal barony of Plympton. It was held from the Courtenays by the feudal tenure of grand sergeanty described as:

"Whenever the Earl may come to Exe Island to fish, or otherwise enjoy himself, then the lord, or proprietor, of this manor, in decent habit or apparel, should attend him with a mantle upon his shoulders and a silver cup filled with wine in his hands, and should offer the same to the said Earl to drink".

== Descent ==
=== Floyer ===
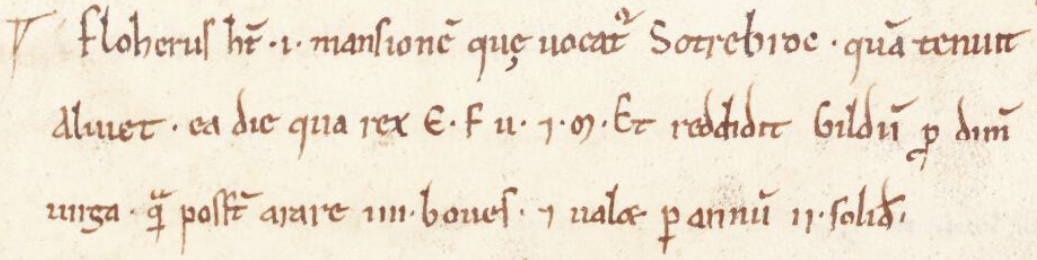
Exon Domesday Entry for Sotrebroc, held by Floherus

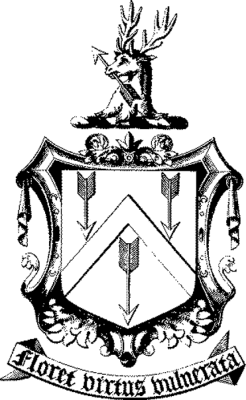
Arms of Floyer of Floyer Hayes: Sable, a chevron between three arrows points downward argent; crest: A stag's head erased or holding in the mouth an arrow argent. Motto: Floret Virtus Vulnerata ("Virtue flourishes wounded")

According to the Exon Domesday Book of 1086 in the section listing holdings of Terrae Francorum Militum in Devenesira ("Lands of French knights in Devonshire"), a man whose name was Latinised to "Floherus" (in French probably Flohère) held the estate of Sotrebroc in Wonford hundred, which later became known as Floyer Hayes. The text is as follows:

Floherus habet i mansionem quae vocatur Sotrebroc quam tenuit Alviet ea die qua rex Eduuardus fuit vivus et mortuus et reddidit gildum pro dimidia virga. quam possunt arare iiii boves et valet per annum ii solidos (which may be translated as: "Flohere has 1 estate which is called ‘Shutbrook’, which Ælfgeat held on the day that King Edward was alive and dead, and it paid geld for half a virgate. 4 oxen can plough this and it is worth 2 shillings a year.")

The scribe preparing the main (Exchequer) Domesday Book appears to have overlooked this entry when transcribing from Exon Domesday, thus it was omitted. This early name of the estate may have come from the Schute Broke, a stream, whose name was recorded by the now lost "Shutbrook Street" in this vicinity. It was later held from the feudal barony of Okehampton. Flohere was also the mesne tenant of the manor of Sutton in the parish of Halberton, Devon, which he held from a certain Aiulf, one of the minor Devon Domesday Book tenants-in-chief of King William the Conqueror. Flohere's mesne-tenancy of Sutton is mentioned only in the Exon Domesday Book. It is unclear whether Flohere was connected to Fulchere a Devon Domesday Book tenant-in-chief, called in the Exon Domesday "Fulchere the Bowman", as the arms adopted by the Floyer family at the start of the age of heraldry (c.1200-1215) featured arrows.

The pedigree of "Floyer of Floyer Hayes" as submitted in the 1564 Heraldic Visitation of Devon by William Floyer (d.1578), commences in the reign of King Hery II (1154-1189) with "Richard Floyer of Floyer Hayes". The manor remained in the possession of the Floyer family until it was sold by Anthony Floyer (born 1596) (son of Anthony Floyer (d.1608) and grandson of William Floyer (d.1578)) to Henry Gould (died 1636). This younger Anthony Floyer married Elinor Pole, a daughter of the Devon historian Sir William Pole (died 1635), who wrote concerning "Floyerhays": Antony Floier, nowe livinge, hath by Elinor, daughter of mee S^{r} Will^{a}m Pole, of Colcombe, Kt, issue: William, John, and others. The said Antony hath alsoe diverse tenements in the parish of St Thomas. Pole's contemporary and fellow Devon historian Tristram Risdon (died 1640) also referred to Anthony Floyer of "Floyers Heyes" thus: The now inheritor thereof married Pole, his father Martin. This refers to Anthony Floyer's mother Anne Martin, 4th daughter and co-heiress of Nicholas Martin of Athelhampton, Dorset, descended from the ancient Martin family, feudal barons of Barnstaple in Devon. Nicholas Martin married Margaret Wadham, one of the three wealthy sisters and co-heiresses of Nicholas Wadham (died 1609), co-founder with his wife Dorothy Petre of Wadham College, Oxford.

The Tudor manor house of the Martins survives at Athelhampton. The descendants of Anne Martin and her husband the older Anthony Floyer retained their one-quarter share in it until 1861, but although at least three subsequent generations made Dorset their home, they lived elsewhere in the county, with the younger Anthony Floyer purchasing Berne House, just west of Bridport. Vivian completed the family's subsequent pedigree down to 1895, which includes the Floyer family of Martin Hall in Lincolnshire and in a junior line John Floyer (1811-1887) of West Stafford, a well-known cricketer and Member of Parliament for Dorset 1846–57.

=== Gould ===
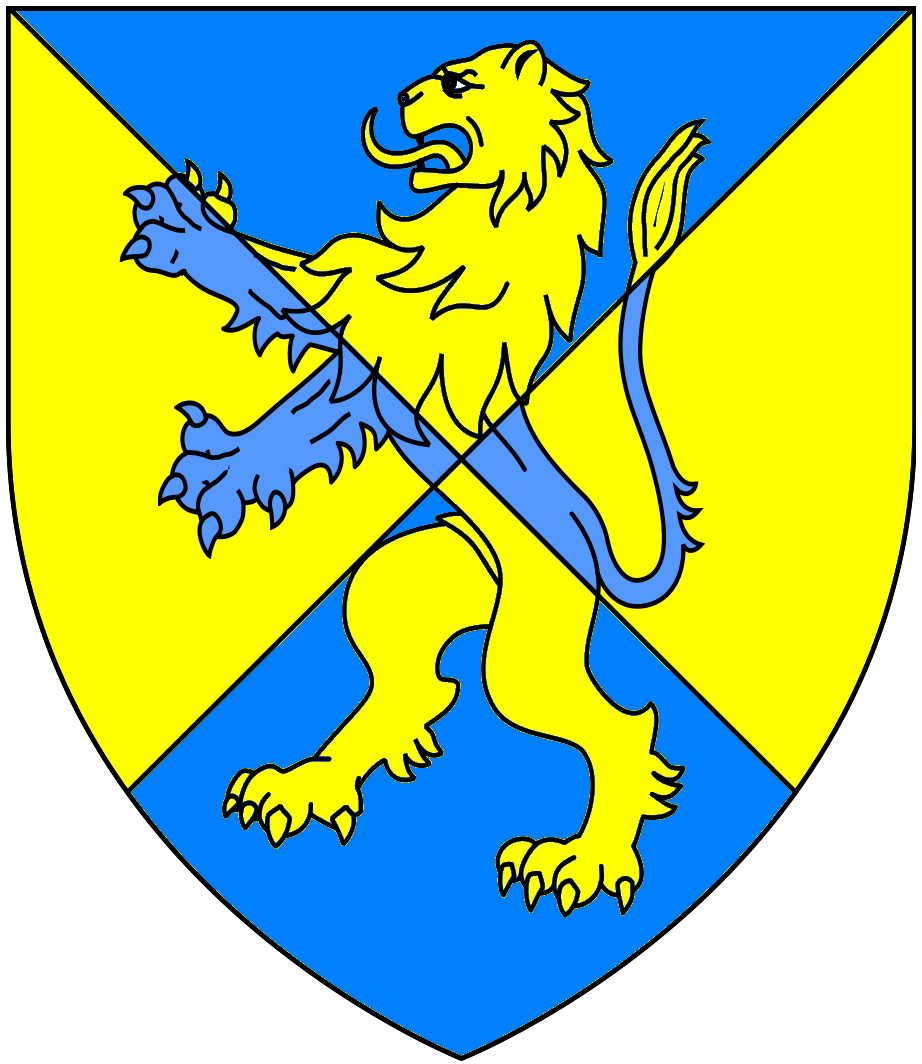
Arms of Gould: Per saltire azure and or a lion rampant counterchanged

The Gould family was descended from a certain John Gold, a crusader present at the siege of Damietta in 1217 who for his valour was granted in 1220 by Ralph de Vallibus an estate at Seaborough in Somerset. The descent of Floyer Hayes in the Gould family was as follows:

- Henry Gould (died 1636), 3rd son of Edward Gould of Combe in the parish of Staverton, Devon, who purchased Floyers Hayes from Anthony Floyer and made it his seat and was buried in St Thomas's Church, Exeter. The manor was thenceforth known as "Hayes", the prefix "Floyer" having been dropped, as is apparent for example in the Gould pedigree by Vivian (1895). In 1626 Gould purchased the manor of Lew Trenchard in Devon, which became the principal seat of his descendants. He was the ancestor of the author Rev. Sabine Baring-Gould (1834–1924) of Lew Trenchard. He appears to have bequeathed or sold Floyer Hayes to his eldest brother William Gould (died 1635) "of Hayes in Com(itatu) Devon juxta Exon" (Latin: "in the County of Devon next to Exeter"), who was buried at St Thomas's, Exeter.
- William Gould (died 1635), elder brother, "of Hayes in Com(itatu) Devon juxta Exon" (Latin: "in the County of Devon next to Exeter"), buried at St Thomas's, Exeter. According to Worthy (1892) there were two estates named "Hayes" in the parish of St Thomas, namely Hayes Barton and Floyer Hayes. In the 16th century Hayes Barton was purchased by John Petre, Collector of Customs of the Port of Exeter, second son of John Petre, of Tor-Bryan, and the brother of Sir William Petre (c. 1505 – 1572), Secretary of State to four successive Tudor monarchs, namely Kings Henry VIII and Edward VI and Queens Mary I and Elizabeth I and the ancestor of Baron Petre. John Petre left Hayes Barton to his son William Petre, who devised it to his son Sir George Petre, of Tor Newton, in the parish of Tor Bryan, by whom it was sold in the reign of James II, to William Gould, son and heir of Edward Gould, of Staverton. Worthy accepts however that Floyer Hayes was purchased by Henry Gould (died 1636) and passed, by means unstated, to the descendants of his elder brother William Gould "of Hayes", and passed via the eventual Gould heiress to the Buller family (see below). William Gould's second daughter Elizabeth Gould married Arthur Upton MP, of Lupton, Devon, and was mother of John Upton, MP, in whose History of Parliament biography the Gould residence is called "Floyers Hayes". In 1604 he married Alice Taylor (died 1631), daughter of Robert Taylor of Pinhoe, Devon.
- Col. William Gould (1615–1644), "of Hayes" and Dunscombe, 2nd but eldest surviving son and heir. He was baptised at St Thomas's, Exeter. During the Civil War he was a Colonel of Horse. He served as Sheriff of Devon and was Governor of Plymouth, from which tenure "Mount Gold" in Plymouth was named. He arrived at Plymouth by sea in 1643 to take command of the Parliamentary forces, but was wounded at Stamford Fort. He became Governor of Plymouth in January 1644, but died that year. In 1645 new defences were built and named "Mount Gould" in his honour. In 1637 he married Anne Browne (died 1641/2), daughter of John Browne of Frampton, Dorset, MP for Bridport in 1621. In 1639 he purchased the manor of Cowick, near Floyer Hayes, from Francis Russell, 4th Earl of Bedford (1593–1641). He was buried in 1644 at St Andrew's Church, Plymouth.
- William Gould (1640–1671), of Hayes and Dunscombe, 2nd but eldest surviving son and heir. He matriculated at Wadham College, Oxford in 1656 and was admitted as a law student at the Inner Temple in 1657. He served as MP for Dartmouth in 1671. He married Agnes Powell, daughter of Edmund Powell of Sandford, Oxfordshire. He died on 24 October 1671 and was buried at St Thomas's, Exeter.
- Moses Gould (1668–1703), "of Hayes", eldest son and heir. He matriculated at Wadham College, Oxford in 1684. In 1692 he purchased the manor of Downes, near Crediton, Devon. Moses married twice, firstly in 1690 to Anne Prust (died 1691), daughter and heiress of Mr Prust of Rawley. Without issue. Secondly to Susanna Kelland, daughter and co-heiress of John Kelland (c.1635-92) of Painsford, MP for Totnes.
- William Gould (1697–1726), of Downes, eldest son and heir, who married Elizabeth Quicke, daughter of Andrew Quicke of Newton St Cyres. He left no sons, only two daughters as co-heiresses (a third daughter Frances Gould (1720–1720) having died an infant):
  - Elizabeth Gould (1718–1742), who married James Buller (1717–1765), of Morval, Cornwall, and of Shillingham, MP for East Looe in Cornwall in 1741 and for Cornwall 1748–1765.
  - Frances Gould (b.1722), who married in 1741 John Tuckfield (1719–1767) of Little Fulford, MP for Exeter 1747-1767 The marriage was without issue, leaving the Buller family sole heirs of the Gould estates, who made Downes their principal seat. Amongst the Buller inheritance from the Goulds was the manor of Cowick. The nearby manor of Marsh Barton was owned by James Buller

=== Templar ===
The Goulds sold this property to the Templar family which "divided it, and destroyed the ancient house". In 1811 Floyer Hayes was the property of Thomas Templar, Esq.
