= Beckinsale =

Beckinsale is a surname. Notable people with the name include:

- Kate Beckinsale (born 1973), English actress
- Mary Beckinsale, English art historian
- Richard Beckinsale (1947–1979), English actor
- Samantha Beckinsale (born 1966), English actress
