= Troutbeck =

Troutbeck may refer to:

== Places ==
- Troutbeck, Manicaland, a village in Manicaland, Zimbabwe
- Troutbeck, Eden, a hamlet near Penrith, Cumbria, England
- Troutbeck, South Lakeland, a village near Windermere, Cumbria, England
- Troutbeck Bridge, a village near Troutbeck, South Lakeland

== Other uses ==
- Trout Beck, a Cumbrian 'beck' in whose valley lies Troutbeck, South Lakeland
- Troutbeck Tongue, a mountain in Cumbria above Trout Beck
- Troutbeck (horse), a Thoroughbred racehorse

== People with the surname ==
- John Troutbeck (diplomat) (1894–1971), British diplomat
- John Troutbeck(1832-1899), Anglican priest and translator
