= Loch Buidhe (Bonar Bridge) =

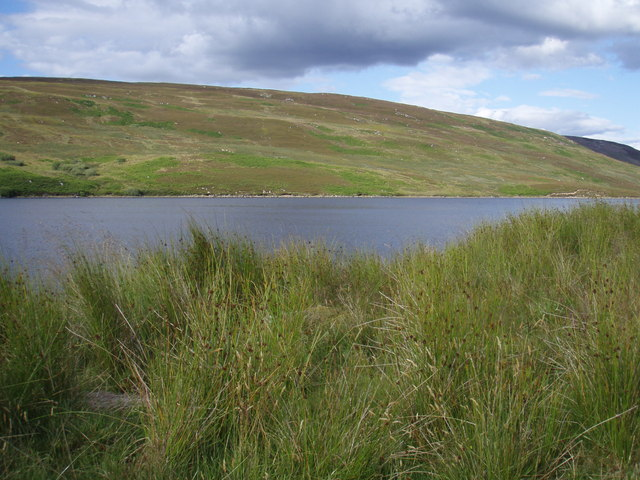

- Location within Highland
- Location: 8 km (5 mi) north-east of Bonar Bridge
- Coordinates: 57.955°N 4.262°W
- Type: Loch
- Max. length: 2 km (1.2 mi)
- Max. depth: (10m.approx)
- Surface elevation: (500m.approx)
- Settlements: Bonar Bridge, Golspie

Loch Buidhe is a freshwater loch in Sutherland, Highland council area, Scotland. It is located about 8 km (5 mi) north-east of Bonar Bridge. The name is Gaelic for yellow loch.
