= Merton (given name) =

Merton is a masculine given name which may refer to:

- Montague Merton Barker (1867–1954), English first-class cricketer and international field hockey player
- Merton J. Batchelder (1896–1975), United States Marine Corps brigadier general
- Merton Bernfield (1938–2002), American pediatrician and cell biologist
- Merton Brown (1913–2001), American classical music composer
- Merton E. Davies (1917–2001), a pioneer of America's space program
- Merton Hanks (born 1968), American former National Football League player
- Merton Hodge (1903–1958), New Zealand playwright
- Merton S. Jackson (died 1985), American politician from Maryland
- Merton Verne Lundquist (born 1940), American sportscaster
- Merton Miller (1923–2000), American economist
- Merton L. Miller (c. 1870–1953), ethnologist and professor
- Merton Russell-Cotes (1835–1921), mayor of Bournemouth, England
- Merton Elvin Scott, Canadian politician
- Merton Sealts (1915–2000), professor of English, particularly American literature

== See also ==
- E. Merton Coulter (1890–1981), American historian, professor and author
