= Winwick =

Winwick may refer to:

- Winwick, Cambridgeshire, England
- Winwick, Cheshire, England
- Winwick, Northamptonshire, England
