= Kirk (surname) =

Kirk is a surname of Scottish and Northern English origin.

== Notable people ==
=== A, B ===
- Aidan Kirk (born 1986), New Zealand rugby player
- Alan Goodrich Kirk (1888–1963), American admiral
- Alejandro Kirk (born 1998), Mexican baseball player
- Alexander Kirk (disambiguation), multiple people
- Alexandra Kirk (born 1944), pseudonymous author
- Alexis Kirk (1936–2010), jeweler
- Andrew Kirk (disambiguation), multiple people
- Anne Kirk (born 1951), Scottish darts player
- Belinda Kirk, British explorer and entrepreneur
- Bernard Kirk (1900–1922), American football player
- Bobby Kirk (ice hockey) (1909–1970), Irish ice hockey player
- Brett Kirk (born 1976), Australian rules footballer
- Brian Kirk (born 1968), Irish television presenter

=== C–F ===
- C. Frank Kirk (1840–1916), American politician from Maryland
- Cecil Kirk (1868–1944), American politician from Maryland
- Charles Kirk (architect) (1791–1847), English builder and architect
- Charlie Kirk (1993–2025), American political activist
- Charlie Kirk (footballer) (born 1997), English footballer
- Claude R. Kirk, Jr. (1926–2011), Governor of Florida
- Chris Kirk (born 1985), American professional golfer
- Christian Kirk (born 1996), American football player
- Dana Kirk (disambiguation), multiple people
- David Kirk (disambiguation), multiple people
- Deanna Kirk, American singer/songwriter
- Donald James Kirk, American accountant
- Edward Kirk (disambiguation), multiple people
- Elizabeth Mooney Kirk (1914–2004), American literacy advocate
- Erika Kirk (born 1988), American civil rights activist, businesswoman, and widow of Charlie Kirk
- Evan Kirk (born 1987), Lacrosse player
- Francis Kirk (c. 1807–1869), early settler of the Swan River Colony in Western Australia

=== G–J ===
- Geoffrey Kirk (1921–2003), British classical scholar
- Gerald Kirk (1883–1915), English footballer
- Gladys Kirk (1903–1974), American politician
- Grayson L. Kirk (1903–1997), president of Columbia University
- Greg Kirk (1963–2019), American politician
- Hans Kirk (1898–1962), Danish 20th-century author
- Herbert Kirk (1912–2006), Northern Irish politician
- James Kirk (disambiguation), multiple people
- Jennifer Kirk (born 1984), American figure skater
- Jenny Kirk (politician), New Zealand politician
- Jesse Allen Kirk (1822–1903), American politician from Maryland
- Joe Kirk (1903–1975), American actor
- Joey Kirk (born 1966), American soccer player
- John Kirk (disambiguation), multiple people
- Jonathan Kirk (born 1991), American rapper known professionally as DaBaby
- Justin Kirk (born 1969), American actor

=== K–N ===
- Karl Kirk (1890–1955), Danish Olympic gymnast
- Kelvin Kirk (1953–2003), American football player
- Kenneth Kirk (1886–1954), bishop of Oxford
- Kent Kirk (born 1948), Danish businessman and politician
- Kris Kirk (1950–1993), English gay activist
- Kristi Kirk, American academic administrator
- Kristian Kirk (born 1986), Danish footballer
- Laura Kirk (born 1966), American actress
- Lawrence Kirk (1886–1969), Canadian agronomist
- Leonard Kirk, American comic book artist
- Linda Kirk (born 1967), Australian Senator
- Lisa Kirk (1925–1990), American actress
- Lynne Golding-Kirk (1920–2008), Australian ballerina
- Malcolm Kirk (1936–1987), English wrestler
- Maria Louise Kirk (1860–1938), American painter and illustrator
- Mark-Lee Kirk (1895–1969), American art director
- Marshall Kirk (1957–2005), genealogist and gay activist
- Matt Kirk (born 1981), Canadian football player
- Milo Kirk, president of Mothers Against Drunk Driving
- Norman Kirk (1923–1974), Prime Minister of New Zealand (1972–1974)

=== O–R ===
- Oliver Kirk (1884–1960), American boxer
- Paul Kirk (disambiguation), multiple people
- Peter Kirk (disambiguation), multiple people
- Phil Kirk, American politician from North Carolina
- Phyllis Kirk (1927–2006), American actress
- Quavas Kirk (born 1988), American soccer player
- Rahsaan Roland Kirk (1935–1977), jazz musician
- Randal J. Kirk (born 1954), American businessman
- Randy Kirk (born 1964), American football player
- Raygan Kirk (born 2001), Canadian ice hockey player
- Ricardo Kirk (1874–1915), Brazilian aviation pioneer
- Richard H. Kirk (1956–2021), English musician
- Robert Kirk (disambiguation), multiple people
- Robie Kirk (1920–2015), songwriter
- Roger Kirk (disambiguation), multiple people
- Ron Kirk (born 1954), United States Trade Representative and former Mayor of Dallas
- Russell Kirk (1918–1994), political writer
- Ruth M. Kirk (1930–2011), American politician from Maryland

=== S–W ===
- Sam Kirk (born 1981), American artist
- Séamus Kirk (born 1945), Irish politician
- Sherridan Kirk (born 1981), Trinidad and Tobago athlete
- Tammy Jo Kirk (born 1962), American racecar and motorcycle racer
- Tara Kirk (born 1982), American olympic swimmer
- Tim Kirk (born 1947), American artist
- Tommy Kirk (1941–2021), American actor
- Thomas Kirk (disambiguation), multiple people
- Vivien Kirk, New Zealand mathematician
- Walter Kirk (1887–1961), soldier
- Walton Kirk Jr. (1924–2012), American basketball player
- William Kirk (disambiguation), multiple people

== Fictional characters ==
- Ben Kirk, character in the Australian soap opera Neighbours
- Drew Kirk, character in the Australian soap opera Neighbours
- Emily Kirk, character in the British soap opera Emmerdale
- George Samuel Kirk, character in Star Trek (brother of Captain James T. Kirk)
- Captain James T. Kirk, starship captain and inaugural lead character in Star Trek
- Jason Kirk, character in the British soap opera Emmerdale
- Paddy Kirk, character in the British soap opera Emmerdale
- Ross Kirk, character in the British soap opera Emmerdale
- Sergeant Kirk, comic book character
- Timmy Kirk, character in the HBO drama series Oz

== See also ==
- Kirk (disambiguation)
- Kirk (word)
- Kirk (given name)
- Kirk (placename element)
