= Kirk =

Kirk commonly refers to:

- Kirk (word), a Scottish word meaning "church", often referring to the Church of Scotland in particular

It may also refer to:

== People ==
- Kirk (given name), people with a first name of Kirk
- Kirk (surname), people with a last name of Kirk

== Places ==
- Kirk (placename element)
- Kirk, Azerbaijan
- Kirk, Ontario, Canada
- Kirk, California, United States; now Kirkwood
- Kirk, Colorado, United States
- Kirk, Oregon, United States
- Kirk, West Virginia, United States
- Kirk (crater), a crater on Charon, the primary moon and double planet of dwarf planet Pluto

=== Facilities and structures ===
- The Kirk (Mason City, Iowa), United States, a historic apartment building
- Kirksville Regional Airport, a public-use airport in Missouri, United States

== Other uses ==
- KIRK (FM), a radio station licensed to Macon, Missouri, United States
- Kirk (TV series), a 1990s American sitcom
- USS Kirk (FF-1087), a U.S. frigate of the Knox class
- Kirk telecom A/S, a former Danish manufacturer of telephones, which was taken over by SpectraLink Corporation, then Polycom
- Kirk (album), an album by DaBaby
- Gods of Silence, a Swiss heavy metal band previously known as Kirk

== See also ==
- KRK (disambiguation)
- Kirkby (disambiguation)
