= Aber and Inver (placename elements) =

Common elements in place-names of Celtic origin

Aber and Inver are common elements in place-names of Celtic origin. Both mean "confluence of waters" or "river mouth". Their distribution broadly reflects the geographical influence of the Brittonic and Goidelic language groups, respectively.

== Aber ==
Aber goes back to Common Brittonic. In Old Welsh it has the form oper (later aper) and is derived from an assumed *od-ber, meaning 'pouring away'. This is derived from the Proto-Indo-European root *bher-, 'carry' (English bear, Latin fero), with the prefix ad-, 'to'. It is found in Welsh, Cornish and Breton.

Place names with aber are very common in Wales (Welsh: Cymru), and are found to a lesser extent in Cornwall and other parts of England and Brittany. It may be that the relative dearth in Cornwall is simply a result of there being fewer rivers on a peninsula. "Aber" names are also common on the east coast of Scotland, and to a lesser extent further west. The Scottish examples are often assumed to be of Pictish origin, then borrowed into Scottish Gaelic, though some have argued that these are native Gaelic coinages.

In Anglicised forms, aber is often contracted: Arbroath (formerly "Aberbrothick") for Aber Brothaig, Abriachan for Aber Briachan. In the case of Applecross (first attested as Aporcrosan), it has been transformed by a folk etymology. (Its Scottish Gaelic name, a' Chomraich, has lost the "Aber-" element altogether)

In modern Scottish Gaelic, "aber" takes the form obar, e.g. Obar Dheadhain "Aberdeen", Obar Pheallaidh "Aberfeldy", and Obar Phuill "Aberfoyle."

The Welsh names Abergwaun (Fishguard), Aberhonddu (Brecon), Aberteifi (Cardigan), Aberdaugleddau (Milford Haven), Aberpennar (Mountain Ash) and Abertawe (Swansea) all contain Aber- in their Welsh language equivalent.

== Inver ==
Inver is the Goidelic or q-Celtic form, an Anglicised spelling of Scottish Gaelic inbhir (originally pronounced with /v/, though in modern Gaelic it has shifted to /j/), which occurs in Irish as innbhear or inbhear, going back to Old Irish indber, inbir, inber. This is derived from the same Proto-Indo-European root *bher-, but with the prefix in-, 'into'. The word also occurs in Manx in the form Inver.

Place-names with inver are very common throughout Scotland, where they outnumber aber-names by about 3:1. They are most common throughout the Western Highlands and the Grampians, the largest town containing the element being Inverness. Place-names with inver are, however, oddly seldom in Ireland, given that the form is originally Irish; Ireland tends instead to have names with béal ('mouth') in such locations, as Béal Átha na Sluaighe (Ballinasloe, County Galway), Béal an Átha an Fheá (Ballina, County Mayo) or Béal Feirste (Belfast). The difference in usage may be explained by the fact that Gaelic was spoken in Ireland long before it was brought to Scotland, and hence the prevailing fashion could have been different.

In Anglicised forms, inver occasionally appears as inner, such as Innerleithen. Innerhaddon is variant of Inverhaddon.

In some cases, an "Inver" has been lost, e.g. Ayr (Inbhir Air), which was recorded as "Inberair", and Ayre (Inver Ayre) in the Isle of Man.

Occasionally, the English name forms are entirely unrelated: Dingwall (Inbhir Pheofharan) in Scotland and Arklow (An tInbhear Mór) in Ireland both have "Inbhir-" in their Gaelic forms.

== Syntax ==
Because Celtic languages place the generic element of a compound (what kind of thing it is) before the specific element (which one it is), the elements aber and inver normally appear at the beginning of a place name, the opposite of the English (Germanic) pattern. Contrast:

- Inverness (mouth of the river Ness)
- Eyemouth (mouth of the river Eye)

Since these names refer to rivermouths (or towns built on rivermouths), the elements aber and inver are the generic elements, whereas the other element (typically the name of the river) is the specific element, telling us which rivermouth is meant.

A variation occurs when the confluence or estuary itself is made the specific element. The names Lochaber and Lochinver mean 'loch of the rivermouth'; in both cases, these are sealochs which function as extended estuaries of medium-sized rivers. Here, the elements aber and inver answer the question "Which loch?" Similarly the name Rossinver refers to a promontary (Irish: ros) jutting out into Lough Melvin just 200 meters east of the mouth of the Glenariff River. Kilninver (Cil an inbhir) means "rivermouth church". Cuan an inver means "estuary bay". In these cases, exceptionally, the elements aber and inver come second.

This is consistent with the stress patterns of these names. Placenames, like other compound nouns, are generally stressed on the specific element. Therefore, the elements aber and inver never carry word-stress, except in the rare occasions where they are in final position: Inverness, Aberfan, but Rossinver.

== Use in British colonies ==
Place names from the British isles were frequently exported to the colonies which became the British Empire, often without any thought being given to etymology. Thus there are many examples in the United States and in Commonwealth countries of places with names in Aber- or Inver- which are not located at a confluence. In Gaelic-speaking Nova Scotia, however, the element Inbhir- seems to have been productive in its original sense.

Invercargill in the South Island of New Zealand is a special case. It was first named Inverkelly in honour of an early settler called Kelly, and was then renamed in honour of Captain William Cargill, who was at the time the Superintendent of Otago, of which Southland was then a part. Since the city was indeed built at the mouth of the Waihopai River, the Inver- element was apparently chosen consciously.

== List of place-names with Aber and Inver ==
=== Australia ===
Aberdare, Aberdeen (New South Wales), Aberdeen (South Australia), Aberdeen (Tasmania), Abermain, Aberglasslyn, Inverell, Inverloch, Inveresk, Invermay, Inverleigh, Invergordon, Invergowrie

=== Wales ===
Aberaeron, Aberaman, Aberangell, Aberarth, Aberavon, Aberbanc, Aberbargoed, Aberbeeg, Abercanaid, Abercarn, Abercastle, Abercegir, Abercraf, Abercregan, Abercych, Abercynon, Aberdare, Aberdaron, Aberdulais, Aberdaugleddau (Milford Haven), Aberdulais, Aberdyfi, Aberedw, Abereiddy, Abererch, Aberfan, Aberffraw, Aberkenfig, Aberogwr, Abergarw, Aberthin, Aberffrwd, Ceredigion, Aberffrwd, Monmouthshire, Abergavenny, Abergele, Abergorlech, Abergwaun (Fishguard), Aberkenfig, Abergwesyn, Abergwili, Abergwynfi, Abergwyngregyn, Abergynolwyn, Aberhafesp, Aberhonddu (Brecon), Aberllefenni, Abermaw (Barmouth), Abermorddu, Abermule, Abernant, Carmarthenshire, Abernant, Powys, Abernant, Rhondda Cynon Taf, Aberpennar (Mountain Ash), Aberporth, Aberriw (Berriew), Abersoch, Abersychan, Abertawe (Swansea), Aberteifi (Cardigan), Aberthin, Abertillery, Abertridwr (Caerphilly), Abertridwr (Powys), Abertysswg, Aberystwyth, Llanaber

=== Ireland ===
An tInbhear (Inver, County Mayo), An tInbhear Mór (Arklow, County Wicklow), Cuan an Inbhir (Broadhaven Bay), Inbhear (Inver, County Donegal), Inbhear nOllarbha (Larne Lough, County Antrim), Inbhear Scéine the traditional name for Kenmare Bay, County Kerry, Rossinver

=== Scotland ===
Aberarder, Aberargie, Aberbothrie, Abercairney, Aberchalder, Aberchirder, Abercorn, Abercrombie, Aberdalgie, Aberdeen, Aberdour, Aberfeldy, Aberfoyle, Abergairn, Abergeldie, Aberlady, Aberlemno, Aberlour, Abermilk, Abernethy, Aberscross, Abersky, Abertarff, Abertay, Aberuchill, Aberuthven, Abriachan, Applecross, Arbirlot, Arboll, Arbuthnott, Arbroath (historically Aberbrothick - Obar Bhrothaig), Fochabers, Kinnaber, Lochaber, Obar Neithich (Nethybridge), Slongaber

Achininver, Inbhir Air (Ayr formerly "Inberair" etc.), Inbhir Bhrùra (Brora), Inbhir Chalain (Kalemouth), Inbhir Eireann (Findhorn), Inbhir Eighe (Eyemouth), Inbhir Ghrainnse (Grangemouth), Inbhir Nàrann (Nairn), Inbhir Pheofharain (Dingwall), Inbhir Theòrsa, Inbhir Ùige (Wick), Innerleithen, Innerleven, Innerwick (in Perth and Kinross), Inver (Highland), Inverarnan, Inverallan, Inveraldie, Inveralmond Inveramsay, Inveran, Inveraray, Inverbervie, Inverclyde, Inveresk, Inverfarigaig, Invergarry, Invergordon, Invergowrie, Inverhaddon (or Innerhaddon), Inverkeilor, Inverkeithing, Inverkeithney, Inverkip, Inverleith, Inverlochlarig, Inverlochy, Invermoriston, Inverness, Inveroran, Invershin, Inversnaid, Invertrossachs, Inverugie, Inveruglas, Inverurie, Kilninver, Lochinver

Notes - "Bail' Inbhir Fharrair",(is an uncommon name for Beauly, usually "A' Mhanachain"); Fort William was formerly known as Inverlochy, and a small district nearby is still referred to as such. Inbhir Ghrainnse and Inbhir Eighe may be of modern origin.

=== Brittany ===
Aber Benoît, Aber Ildut, Aber Wrac'h, L'Aber, Crozon

=== England ===
The Cornish names of Falmouth (Aberfal) and Plymouth (Aberplymm). Aberford in West Yorkshire has a different origin. Berwick may have had the aber- prefix originally. According to Llywarch Hên, an Aber Lleu near Lindisfarne was the site of Urien of Rheged's assassination.

=== Isle of Man ===
Inver Ayre (Ayre)

=== Canada ===
Italicised names denote usage in Canadian Gaelic.

Loch Abar (Lochaber, NS)

Baile Inbhir Nis (Inverness, NS), Siorramachd Inbhir Nis (Inverness County, NS), Inbhir-pheofharain (Dingwall, NS), Inverhuron, ON, Invermere, BC, Invermay, Saskatchewan

=== New Zealand ===
Invercargill

== Sources ==
- David Dorward, Scotland's Place Names, Mercat Press, Edinburgh, 2001.
- Reed, A.W. (2002) The Reed dictionary of New Zealand place names. Auckland: Reed Books. ISBN 0-790-00761-4.

== See also ==
- List of generic forms in place names in Ireland and the United Kingdom
- Welsh placenames – Place names of Wales
- Kirk as a placename element
