= John Kirk =

John Kirk may refer to:

== Military ==
- John Kirk (soldier) (1827–1865), awarded the Victoria Cross
- John Kirk (Medal of Honor), American Indian Wars soldier on List of Medal of Honor recipients for the Indian Wars

== Sportspeople ==
- John Kirk (footballer, born 1922) (1922–2006), English football winger with Darlington
- John Kirk (footballer, born 1930) (1930–2003), Canadian football inside forward with Accrington Stanley
- John Kirk (cyclist) (1890–1951), British Olympic cyclist

== Politicians ==
- John Kirk (New Zealand politician) (1947–?)
- John Angus Kirk (1837–1910), Canadian politician and farmer
- John P. Kirk (1867–1952), American politician, mayor of Ypsilanti, Michigan

== Others ==
- John Kirk (antiquarian) (1760–1851), Roman Catholic priest and antiquary
- John Kirk (explorer) (1832–1922), worked alongside David Livingstone in southern Africa
- John Foster Kirk (1824–1904), American historian, journalist, educator and bibliographer
- John Kirk (archaeologist) (1869–1940), British twentieth-century archaeologist
