= Kirk (placename element) =

Kirk is found as an element in many place names in Scotland, England, and North America. It is derived from kirk, a Nordic-influenced variant of the word "church". In Scotland, it is sometimes an English translation from a Scots Gaelic form involving cille or eaglais, both words for 'church'. Rarely it is found in Anglicisations of Continental European placenames which originally had Dutch kerk or a related form.

== List ==
Kirk by itself is the name of two places:

- Kirk, Caithness, Highland
- Kirk, Colorado, a US town

More usually it is an element in a compound name. The remainder of this article is a list of some of these.

In Scotland

- Ashkirk, Scottish Borders
- Falkirk
- Halkirk, Caithness, Highland
- Kirkburn, Scottish Borders
- Kirkcowan, Dumfries and Galloway
- Kirkcudbright, Dumfries and Galloway
- Kirkconnel, Dumfries and Galloway
- Kirkfieldbank, South Lanarkshire
- Kirkgunzeon, Dumfries and Galloway
- Kirkhill, Highland
- Kirkhill, South Lanarkshire
- Kirkhope, Scottish Borders
- Kirkliston, Edinburgh
- Kirkmaiden, Dumfries and Galloway
- Kirkmichael, South Ayrshire
- Kirkmuirhill, South Lanarkshire
- Kirknewton, West Lothian
- Kirkoswald, South Ayrshire
- Kirkton of Skene, Aberdeenshire, and many other Kirktons, all tiny, and mostly matched with a Castleton or a Milton.
- Kirk, Caithness, Highland
- Kirkton (various)
- Kirkwall, Orkney
- Kirkwood, Coatbridge
- Kirkwood Estate, East Ayrshire
- Kirk Yetholm, Scottish Borders
- Prestonkirk, East Lothian
- Selkirk, Scottish Borders

In certain situations however, apparent instances of Kirk are, in their first element, from the Scots Gaelic word Cathair ("city, fortress"), or the Brittonic caer ("city, fortress").

- Kirkbuddo, Angus
- Kirkcaldy, Fife
- Kirkintilloch, Dunbartonshire

In England (by Lieutenancy area)

- County Durham
  - Kirk Merrington
  - Romaldkirk (formerly North Riding of Yorkshire)
- Cambridge
  - Kirkham
  - Kirkgate
- Chadkirk, Cheshire
- Cumbria
  - Kirkbride
  - Kirkby-in-Furness
  - Kirkby Kendal
  - Kirkby Lonsdale, Westmorland
  - Kirkby Stephen
  - Kirkoswald
  - Kirkland, Woodside, Cumberland
  - Kirkland, Lamplugh, Cumberland
  - Kirkland, Culgaith, Westmorland and Furness
  - Kirkstone Pass
- Dunkirk, Kent
- Lancashire/ Merseyside
  - Kirkdale, Liverpool, Merseyside
  - Kirkby, Merseyside
  - Kirkham
  - Kirkland
  - Kirkholt
  - Ormskirk
  - Church Kirk (meaning church church; a tautology)
- Colkirk, Norfolk
- Peakirk, Northamptonshire
- Nottinghamshire
  - Kirkby-in-Ashfield
  - Kirklington
- Northumberland
  - Kirkharle
  - Kirkhaugh
  - Kirkheaton
  - Kirknewton
- Kirkley, Suffolk
- Lincolnshire
  - Kirkby on Bain
  - Kirkstead
- Yorkshire
  - East Riding of Yorkshire
    - Kirkburn
  - North Yorkshire
    - Kirkbymoorside
    - Kirkdale
    - Kirkham
    - Kirklevington
    - Kirkleatham
    - Kirklington
    - Felixkirk
  - West Yorkshire
    - Kirkhamgate
    - Kirkheaton
    - Kirklees
    - Kirkstall
    - Kirkburton

In Belgium

- East Dunkirk (from Dutch Oostduinkerke; West Flemish Ôostduunkerke)

In the Faroe Islands

- Kirkja (Danish: Kirke)
- Kirkjubøur (Danish: Kirkebø)

In Finland

- Kirkkokari, Satakunta (from Swedish Kyrkholmen)
- Kirkkonummi, Uusimaa (Swedish: Kyrkslätt)
- Kirkkosaari, Northern Savonia

In France

- Dunkirk, Nord-Pas-de-Calais (from Dutch Duinkerke; West Flemish Duunkerke; French Dunkerque)

In Iceland

- Kirkjubæjarklaustur
- Kirkjufell (Church Mountain)

In Norway

- Kirkenes, Finnmark

In North America

- Kirkland, Quebec, Canada
- Kirkland, Washington, United States
- Kirkpatrick, Oregon, United States
- Newkirk, Oklahoma, United States
- Selkirk, Manitoba, Canada, named after Thomas Douglas, 5th Earl of Selkirk

== See also ==
- Kirk (word)
- Kirk (disambiguation)
- Kirk (surname)
- Kirk (given name)
- List of generic forms in British place names
- Aber and Inver as place-name elements
