= Kirk (word) =

Scottish term for 'church'

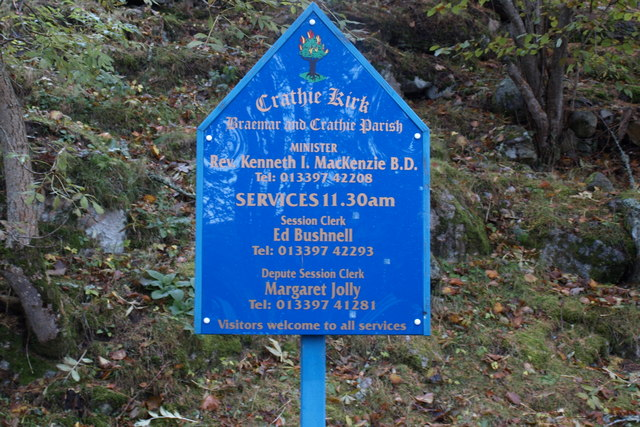
Sign at the entrance to Crathie Kirk, the Church of Scotland parish church in the village of Crathie, in Aberdeenshire, Scotland

Kirk is a Scottish and former Northern English word meaning 'church'. The term the Kirk is often used informally to refer specifically to the Church of Scotland, the Scottish national church that developed from the 16th-century Scottish Reformation. Many place names and personal first and last names are derived from kirk.

== Meaning and etymology ==
As a common noun, kirk (meaning 'church') is found in Scots, Scottish English, Ulster-Scots and some English dialects, attested as a noun from the 14th century onwards, but as an element in placenames much earlier. Both words, kirk and church, derive from the Koine Greek κυριακόν (δωμα) (kyriakon (dōma)) meaning "Lord's (house)". This was borrowed into the Germanic languages in late antiquity, possibly in the course of the Gothic missions. At some point, kyriakon, of neuter gender in Greek, became of feminine gender in Germanic languages, perhaps due to influences from the Gothic language.

Whereas church displays Old English palatalisation, kirk is a loanword from Old Norse and thus retains the original mainland Germanic consonants. Compare cognates: Icelandic & Faroese kirkja; Swedish kyrka (where the first ‘k’ was later palatalized as well); Danish and Norwegian (Bokmål) kirke; Norwegian (Nynorsk) kyrkje; Dutch and Afrikaans kerk; German Kirche (reflecting palatalization before unstressed front vowel); Low German Kark; West Frisian tsjerke; and borrowed into non-Germanic languages Estonian kirik and Finnish kirkko.

== Church of Scotland ==
As a proper noun, the Kirk is an informal name for the Church of Scotland, the country's national church and this term is frequently used in the media, in everyday speech and in the church's own literature. The Kirk of Scotland was in official use as the name of the Church of Scotland until the 17th century. Kirk Session is still the standard term in church law for the court of elders in the local congregation, both in the Church of Scotland and in any of the other Scottish Presbyterian denominations.

== Free Kirk ==
Even more commonly, The Free Kirk is heard as an informal name for the Free Church of Scotland, the remnant of an evangelical presbyterian church formed in 1843 when its founders withdrew from the Church of Scotland. See:

- Free Church of Scotland (1843–1900)
- Free Church of Scotland (since 1900)

A pair of rhyming jibes remain from the time of the heated split of the Disruption in 1843, when about a third of the Auld Kirk of Scotland left to form the Free Kirk. The Free Kirkers, who had sometimes given up homes as well as church buildings and started financially from scratch, were taunted with the rhyme: “The Free Kirk, the wee Kirk, the Kirk without the steeple”. This rhyme linking the Free Kirk with the derogatory diminutive "wee" was offensive, and a reply was devised in: The Auld Kirk, the cauld Kirk. The Kirk wi’out the people.

== High Kirk ==
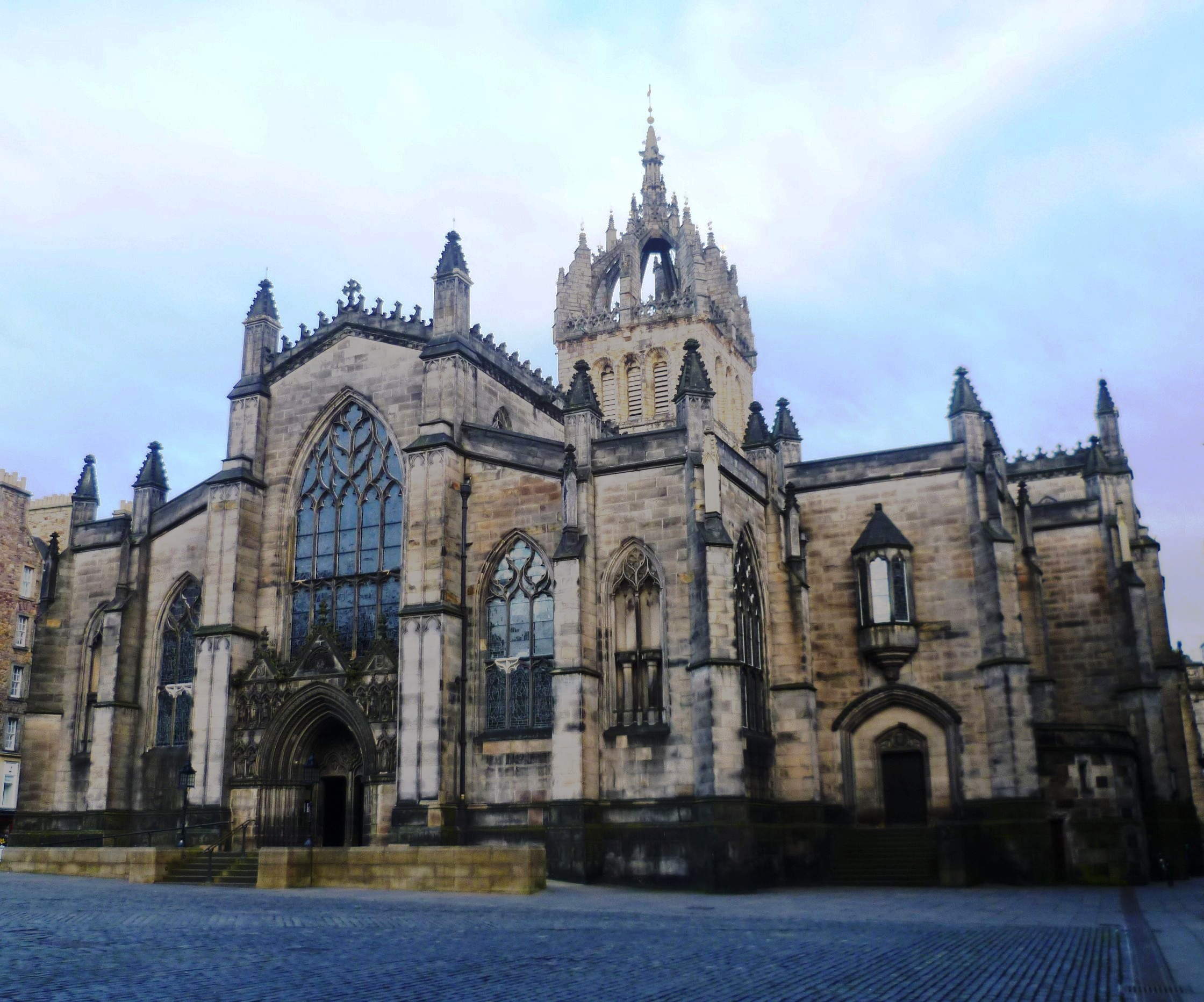
The High Kirk of Edinburgh

High Kirk is the term sometimes used to describe a congregation of the Church of Scotland that uses a building that had been a cathedral prior to the Reformation. As the Church of Scotland is not governed by bishops, it has no cathedrals in the episcopal sense of the word. In more recent times, the traditional names have been revived, so that in many cases both forms can be heard: Glasgow Cathedral, as well as the High Kirk of Glasgow, and St. Giles' Cathedral, as well as the High Kirk of Edinburgh. The term "High Kirk", however, should be used with some caution. Several towns have a congregation known as the High Kirk that were never pre-Reformation cathedrals. Examples include:

- Dundee, where the High Kirk is not the historic Dundee Parish Church known as St Mary's, but St David's;
- Paisley, where there were former congregations and parishes surrounding three churches: the High Kirk (now formally Oakshaw Trinity Church, but still retaining the High Kirk name), the Middle Kirk and the Laigh Kirk, the Middle Kirk no longer existing as a religious institution and none of the three names referred to Paisley's historic Abbey;
- Stevenston High Kirk in Ayrshire.

There is no connection between the term 'High Kirk' and the term 'High Church', which is a type of Churchmanship within the Anglican Communion.

== Kirk Session ==
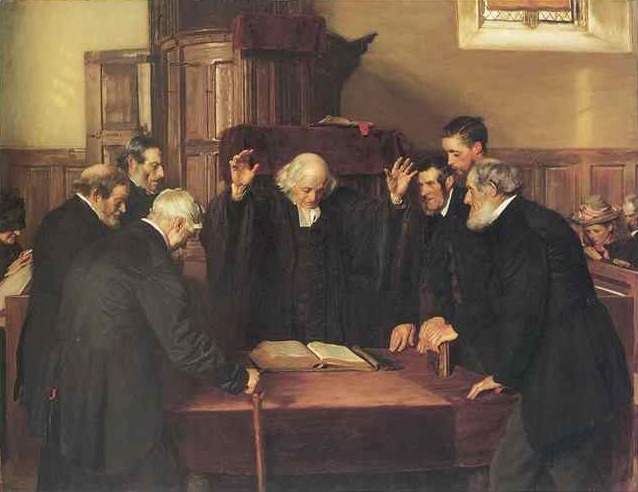
The Ordination of Elders in a Scottish Kirk, by John Henry Lorimer, 1891. National Gallery of Scotland.

The first court of Presbyterian polity where the Elders of a particular congregation gather as a Session or meeting to govern the spiritual and temporal affairs of the church.

== Kirking ceremonies ==
The verb to kirk, meaning 'to present in church', was probably first used for the annual church services of some Scottish town councils, known as the Kirking of the Council. Since the re-establishment of the Scottish Parliament in 1999, the Kirking of the Parliament has become a fixed ceremony at the beginning of a session. Historically a newly married couple would attend public worship as husband and wife for the first time at their kirking. In Nova Scotia, Kirking of the Tartan ceremonies have become an integral part of most Scottish Festivals and Highland Games.

== Place names ==
Kirk is found mainly as an element in many placenames of Scotland, England and countries of large British expatriate communities.

Scottish examples include Falkirk, Kirkwall and numerous Kirkhills and Kirktons. Examples in England are Ormskirk and Kirkby in Lancashire, and Kirkstall, Kirklees and Kirklevington in Yorkshire. Newkirk, Oklahoma in the United States is another example.

The element is not only found in place names of Anglo-Saxon origin but also in Anglo-Gaelic Southern Scottish names such as Kirkcudbright, a place around a Cudbright church. Here, the Gaelic element cil- (coming from a monk's cell) might have been expected to go with the Gaelic form of Cuthbert. The reason appears to be that kirk was borrowed into local Galwegian, though it does not seem to have been a part of spoken Gaelic in the Highlands or Ireland.

When the element appears in placenames of the former British empire, a distinction can be made between those where the element is productive (named after a church) or transferred – from a place in Britain. Kirkland, a city in the United States, is an exception, being named after the surname of an English settler, Peter Kirk.

The element kirk is also used in anglicisations of continental European place names, originally formed from one of the continental Germanic cognates. Dunkirk (French Flanders) is a rendering of the Dutch West-Flemish dialect word Duunkerke or standard Dutch word Duinkerke.

== Personal names ==
Kirk is also in use as both a surname and a male forename. Parallels in other languages are rarer than with placenames, but English Church and German Kirch can also be a surname.

== See also ==
- Kirk Party
