= Free Kirk =

The Free Church of Scotland, an evangelical presbyterian church formed in 1843 when its founders withdrew from the Church of Scotland, also known as the Kirk (word). See:

- Free Church of Scotland (1843-1900)
- Free Church of Scotland (post 1900)
