= Girk =

Girk may refer to:

- The village of Kirk in Azerbaijan, also known as Girk.
- A G protein-coupled inwardly-rectifying potassium channel, abbreviated as GIRK.
