= General Kirk =

General Kirk or Kirke may refer to:

- Edward N. Kirk (1828–1863), Union Army brigadier general
- John P. Kirk (1867–1952), U.S. Army general
- Norman T. Kirk (1888–1960), U.S. Army major general
- Paul G. Kirk Sr. (1904–1981), U.S. Army brevet brigadier general
- Percy Kirke (British Army officer) (1684–1741), British Army lieutenant general
- Percy Kirke (c. 1646–1691), British Army lieutenant general
- Walter Kirke (1877–1949), British Army general
- William L. Kirk (1932–2017), U.S. Air Force General

== See also ==
- James T. Kirk, fictional starship captain and, in some media, admiral
