= KRK =

KRK or Krk can mean:

== Places ==
- Krk, an island in the Adriatic Sea
  - Krk (town), on Krk island, Croatia
  - Roman Catholic Diocese of Krk
  - Principality of Krk

=== Facilities and structures ===
- John Paul II International Airport Kraków-Balice, Poland, IATA code
- Kot Radha Kishan railway station, Kasur, Punjab, Pakistan, station code
- Kirkconnel railway station, Dumfries and Galloway, Scotland, station code
- Krk Bridge, Croatia
- Krk LNG terminal, Croatia

== People ==
- Kamaal Rashid Khan, an Indian actor

=== Fictional characters ===
- Keval Ram Kushwaha, in 2012 Indian TV show Madhubala – Ek Ishq Ek Junoon

== Other uses ==
- Kerek language (ISO 639 code)
- KRK Systems, a music device maker
- Kaathuvaakula Rendu Kaadhal, abbreviated as KRK, a 2022 Indian film by Vignesh Shivan

== See also ==
- Kirk (disambiguation)
