= Yenikənd, Ismayilli =

Yenikənd
- Location within Azerbaijan
- Coordinates: 40°41′53″N 48°02′16″E
- Country: Azerbaijan
- Rayon: Ismailli
- Municipality: Kəlbənd
- Time zone: UTC+4 (AZT)
  - Summer (DST): UTC+5 (AZT)

Yenikənd (known as Qırmızı Oktyabr until 2001) is a village in the Ismayilli Rayon of Azerbaijan. The village forms part of the municipality of Kəlbənd.
