= Concordia Tornados women's soccer =

American college soccer team

- University: Concordia University, Texas
- Head coach: Jeana Rich
- Conference: American Southwest Conference
- Location: Austin, Texas, US
- Stadium: St. Francis Field (capacity: 500)
- Nickname: Nados
- Colors: Purple and gold
Home	Away

Concordia Tornados is the women's soccer team of Concordia University Texas. It is affiliated with the American Southwest Conference of NCAA Division III.

== See also ==
- Concordia Tornados men's soccer
