= Roger Kirk =

Roger Kirk is the name of:

- Roger Kirk (designer), Australian costume designer
- Roger Kirk (diplomat) (1930–2023), diplomat and United States Ambassador to Somalia and Romania
- Roger Kirk (Pennsylvania politician) (1751–1809), American politician from Pennsylvania
- Roger E. Kirk (born 1930), American psychologist

== See also ==
- Roger Kirkby (disambiguation)
- Roger Kirkman
