= Concordia Tornados men's soccer =

College soccer team in Austin, Texas

- University: Concordia University, Texas
- Head coach: Jordan Parron
- Conference: SCAC
- Location: Austin, Texas, US
- Stadium: St. Francis Field (capacity: 500)
- Nickname: Tornados
- Colors: Purple and gold
Home	Away

NCAA tournament appearances
- 1

Concordia Tornados is the soccer team of the Concordia University Texas in the capital of Texas, Austin. It is affiliated with the Southern Collegiate Athletic Conference of NCAA Division III.

The Tornados appeared in their first American Southwest Conference tournament in 2015, winning a quarterfinal versus the University of the Ozarks before losing a semifinal match to the University of Texas at Dallas. The Tornados started the 2015 season with a school-record seven game winning streak en route to a first-ever winning season, finishing the year with a record of 12–3–1. In 2021, the Tornados won their first American Southwest Conference championship, defeating Hardin-Simmons University 4–3 in a penalty shootout following a 1–1 draw.

Career goals	Career games	Career saves
18 – Zak Bergstrom (14–15)	48 – Dan Darden (03-06)	389 – Dan Darden (03-06)
6 – Memi Musabasic (00-01)	46 – Conor Woolbert (06-08)	238 – Luis Silva (00)
6 – Shaun Gerard (06)	44 – Trevor Gian (02-05)	156 – Eric Davis (07-08)
6 – Jordan Kone (05-06)	42 – Vance Sayers (02-05)	144 – Brett Davis (05-06)
5 – Chris Arden (08)	41 – Armando Dimeo (06-08)	124 – Tom Heitman (99)
5 – Armando Dimeo (06-08)	40 – Josh Jackson (04-06)	59 – Jason Elliott (01)
4 – Brian Friend (08)	31 – Brandon Wiliams (05-06)	53 – Bobby Bush (07)
3 – Josh Jackson (04-06)	31 – Brett Davis (05-06)	46 – Brian Hawkins (02)
3 – Trevor Gian (02-05)	31 – Chris Williams (99, 01)	43 – John Relic (02)
2 – James Tufano (06)	30 – Mario Beltran (05-06)	31 – Tim Beliakov (01)

== See also ==
- Concordia Tornados women's soccer
