= Kirk (given name) =

Kirk is a given name. Notable people with the name include:

== People ==
=== Arts ===
- Kirk Covington (born 1956/1957), American musician
- Kirk Franklin (born 1970), American gospel musician
- Kirk Hammett (born 1962), American musician, lead guitarist of Metallica
- Kirk Jarvinen (born 1967), American artist
- Kirk Joseph (born 1961), American musician
- Kirk Kelly (born c. 1960), American singer
- Kirk Lightsey (born 1937), American pianist
- Kirk Mitchell (born 1950), American author
- Kirk Pengilly (born 1958), Australian musician
- Kirk Powers (born 1957), American musician
- Kirk Whalum (born 1958), American saxophonist
- Kirk Windstein (born 1965), American musician

=== Athletics ===
- Kirk Baptiste (born 1963), American Olympics athlete
- Kirk Barton (born 1984), American football player
- Kirk Baumgartner (born 1967), American football player
- Kirk Bowman (born 1952), Canadian ice hockey player
- Kirk Broadfoot (born 1984), Scottish footballer
- Kirk Bullinger (born 1969), American baseball player
- Kirk Chambers (born 1979), American football player
- Kirk Cousins (born 1988), American football player
- Kirk Dixon (born 1984), English rugby player
- Kirk Dressendorfer (born 1969), American baseball player
- Kirk Earlywine (born 1964), American basketball coach
- Kirk Edwards (born 1984), Barbadian cricketer
- Kirk Ferentz (born 1955), American football coach
- Kirk Furey (born 1976), Canadian ice hockey player
- Kirk Gibson (born 1957), American baseball player
- Kirk Hanefeld (born 1956), American golfer
- Kirk Haston (born 1979), American basketball player
- Kirk Herbstreit (born 1969), American sportscaster
- Kirk Hilton (born 1981), English footballer
- Kirk Hinrich (born 1981), American basketball player
- Kirk Hudson (born 1986), English footballer
- Kirk Hunter (born 1963), Northern Irish footballer
- Kirk Jackson (born 1976), English footballer
- Kirk Johnson (born 1972), Canadian boxer
- Kirk Lowdermilk (born 1963), American football player
- Kirk Maltby (born 1972), Canadian ice hockey player
- Kirk McCarthy (1966–2004), Australian motorcycle racer
- Kirk McCaskill (born 1961), Canadian baseball player
- Kirk McLean (born 1966), Canadian ice hockey player
- Kirk Merritt (born 1997), American football player
- Kirk Morrison (born 1972), American football player
- Kirk Morrison (poker player), American poker player
- Kirk Muller (born 1966), Canadian ice hockey player
- Kirk Netherton (born 1985), English rugby player
- Kirk Nielsen (born 1973), American ice hockey player
- Kirk O'Bee (born 1977), American cyclist
- Kirk Olivadotti (born 1974), American football coach
- Kirk Palmer (born 1986), Australian Olympics swimmer
- Kirk Penney (born 1980), New Zealand basketball player
- Kirk Powell (born 1972), Jamaican cricketer
- Kirk Radomski (born 1969), American figure in the baseball steroids scandal
- Kirk Reynoldson (born 1979), Australian rugby player
- Kirk Rueter (born 1970), American baseball player
- Kirk Saarloos (born 1979), American baseball player
- Kirk Scrafford (born 1967), American football player
- Kirk Shelmerdine (born 1958), American race car driver
- Kirk Yeaman (born 1983), English rugby player

=== Entertainment ===
- Kirk Acevedo (born 1974), American actor
- Kirk Alyn (1910–1999), American actor
- Kirk Baily (1963–2022), American actor
- Kirk Baltz (born 1959), American actor
- Kirk Baxter (born 1972), Australian film editor
- Kirk Brandon (born 1956), English musician
- Kirk Browning (1921–2008), American television executive
- Kirk Cameron (born 1970), American actor
- Kirk DeMicco (born 1969), American screenwriter
- Kirk Degiorgio, British DJ
- Kirk Demorest, American filmmaker
- Kirk Douglas (1916–2020), American actor
- Kirk Fogg (born 1959), American actor
- Kirk Fox, American actor
- Kirk Francis (born 1947), American film sound mixer
- Kirk Harris, American actor
- Kirk Talley (born 1958), American musician
- Kirk Thornton (born 1956), American voice actor
- Kirk B. R. Woller (born 1962), American actor

=== Finance ===
- Kirk Boott (1790–1837), American industrialist
- Kirk Kerkorian (1917–2015), American businessman

=== Law ===
- Kirk Anderson (judge) (born 1967), Jamaican judge
- Kirk Bloodsworth (born 1960), American advocate for justice reform
- Kirk Cashmere (1955–2004), American lawyer

=== Military ===
- Kirk Lippold (born 1959), American naval officer

=== Politics ===
- Kirk Bangstad (born 1976/1977), American brewer and political candidate
- Kirk Cornish, Bahamian politician
- Kirk Cox (born 1957), American politician
- Kirk Dawes (born 1958), British mediator
- Kirk Fordham (born 1967), American Congressional aide
- Kirk Fordice (1934–2004), American politician
- Kirk Humphreys (born 1950), American politician
- Kirk MacDonald (born 1975), Canadian politician
- Kirk Schuring (born 1952), American politician
- Kirk Talbot (born 1969), American politician
- Kirk Wagoner, American politician
- Kirk Watson (born 1958), American politician
- Kirk White (born 1962), American politician and neopagan author

=== Science ===
- Kirk Bryan (geologist) (1888–1950), American geologist
- Kirk Bryan (oceanographer) (born 1929), American oceanographer

=== Others ===
- Kirk Hyslop (1889–?), Canadian architect
- Kirk Lankford (born 1985), American murderer
- Kirk Martinez, English academic
- Kirk Schulz (born 1963), president of Kansas State University

== Fictional characters ==
- Kirk Anderson (As the World Turns), character on the soap opera As the World Turns
- Kirk Cranston (Santa Barbara), character on the soap opera Santa Barbara
- Kirk Gleason, a character from the WB show Gilmore Girls
- Kirk Lazarus, character from Tropic Thunder
- Kirk Sutherland, character in British TV series Coronation Street
- Kirk Van Houten, character from The Simpsons

== See also ==
- Kirk (disambiguation)
- Kirk (surname)
