= Tartan Day =

Celebration of Scottish heritage

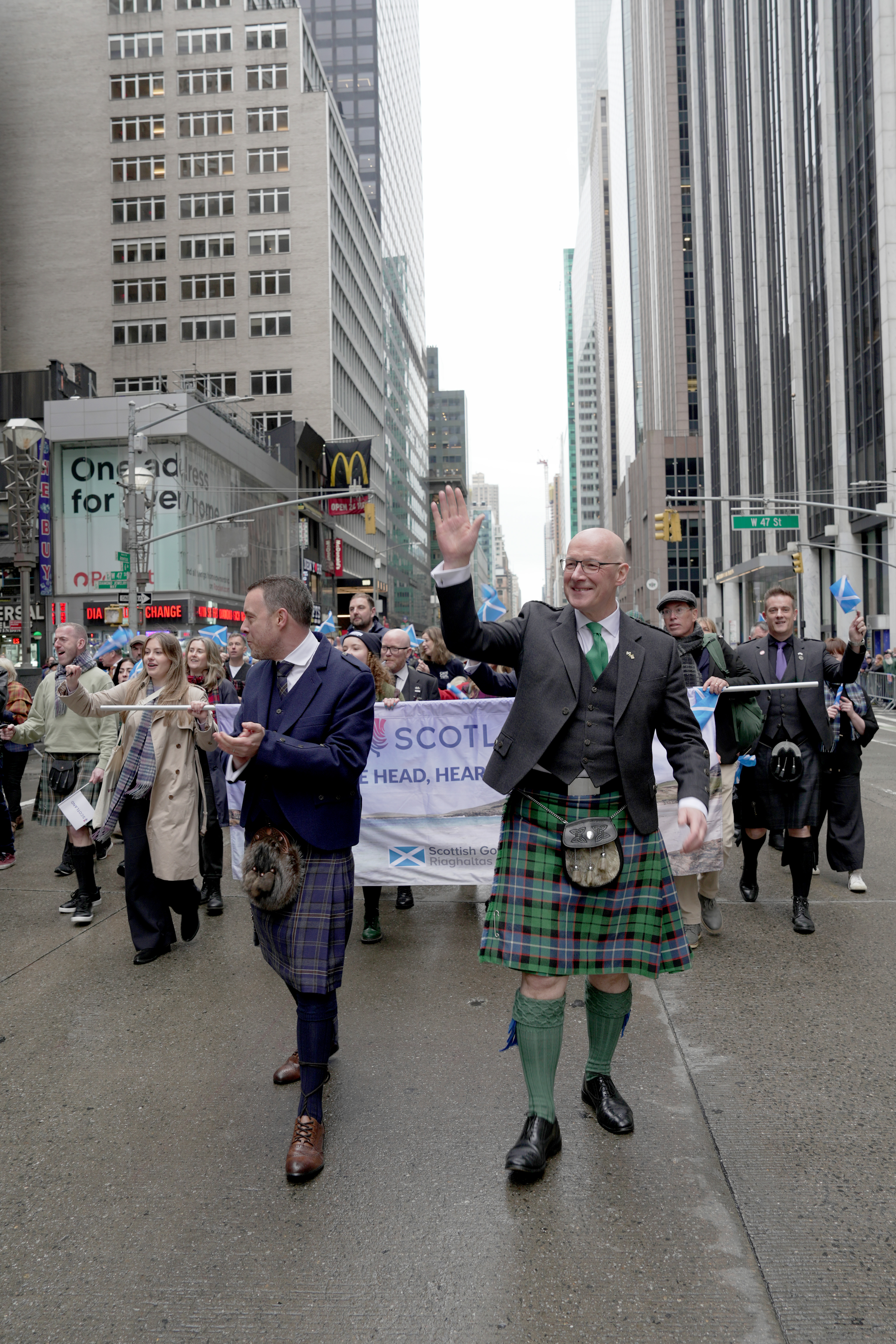
- First Minister of Scotland, John Swinney (right), at the 2025 Tartan Day parade in New York City, United States
- Observed by: Scottish diaspora
- Celebrations: Parades of pipe bands, Highland dance, and other Scottish-themed events.
- Date: 6 April (Argentina, Canada, Scotland, United States); 1 July (Australia, New Zealand)
- Frequency: Annual
- First time: 1987
- Started by: Scottish Canadians

Tartan Day (Scottish Gaelic: Là an Tartain) is a celebration of Scottish heritage and the cultural contributions of Scottish and Scottish-diaspora figures of history. The name refers to tartan, a patterned woollen cloth associated with Scotland. The event originated in Nova Scotia, Canada, in 1987. It spread to other communities of the Scottish diaspora, such as Australia, the United States and New Zealand, and to Scotland itself, in the 1990s to 2000s. Tartan Day is held on April 6, the date on which the Declaration of Arbroath was signed in 1320. It is celebrated in Canada (since 1987, officially and nationally since 2010), the United States (since 1997, with increasing recognition in 1998, 2005, and 2008 as National Tartan Day), and Argentina (unofficially from 2006).

The same date is used for locally official Tartan Days in Aberdeen and Angus, Scotland (from 2004). In the former, it has since shifted into the charity fundraiser KiltWalk, now running in four Scottish cities. In the latter, home to the town of Arbroath, the day is increasingly renamed Declaration Day, since 2016, and associated with events commemorating the Declaration of Arbroath and other aspects of Scottish history.

International Tartan Day is held in various states of Australia (from 1989, with varying levels of official recognition) and in New Zealand (unofficially since 2008) on July 1, the anniversary of the 1782 repeal of the Dress Act 1746, which had banned the male wearing of Highland dress in much of Scotland. Related unofficial events in France (since 2002) have been held on varying days of the year, often also celebrating Breton culture.

Tartan Day has expanded into an entire Tartan Week in New York City and Angus, and into multi-day events in some other locations, including Washington, DC. The name Scotland Week has also been promoted in Scotland. The events typically have parades of pipe bands, Highland dancing, and other Scottish-themed activities.

== Origins ==
On March 9, 1986, a "Tartan Day" to promote Scottish heritage in Canada was proposed at a meeting of the Federation of Scottish Clans in Nova Scotia (the name of which is Latin for 'New Scotland'); the first event was held April 6, 1987. After a period of adoption by provinces and territories of Canada, a National Tartan Day of April 6 was declared in 2010.

In Australia, wearing tartan on July 1 has been encouraged since 1989. The day has been promoted as International Tartan Day in Australia since 1996 and has been formally recognized by some states, but not at a national level.

The first (unofficial) national-level Tartan Day in the US was observed an April 6, 1997, growing from county- and state-level observance inspired by Canadian events. The holiday was approved by the US Senate in 1998, the House of Representatives in 2005, and the President in 2008.

Similar events in other countries appear to have been inspired by those in Canada, Australia, and the US, and date from the 2000s or later.

== Participating countries ==
=== Argentina ===
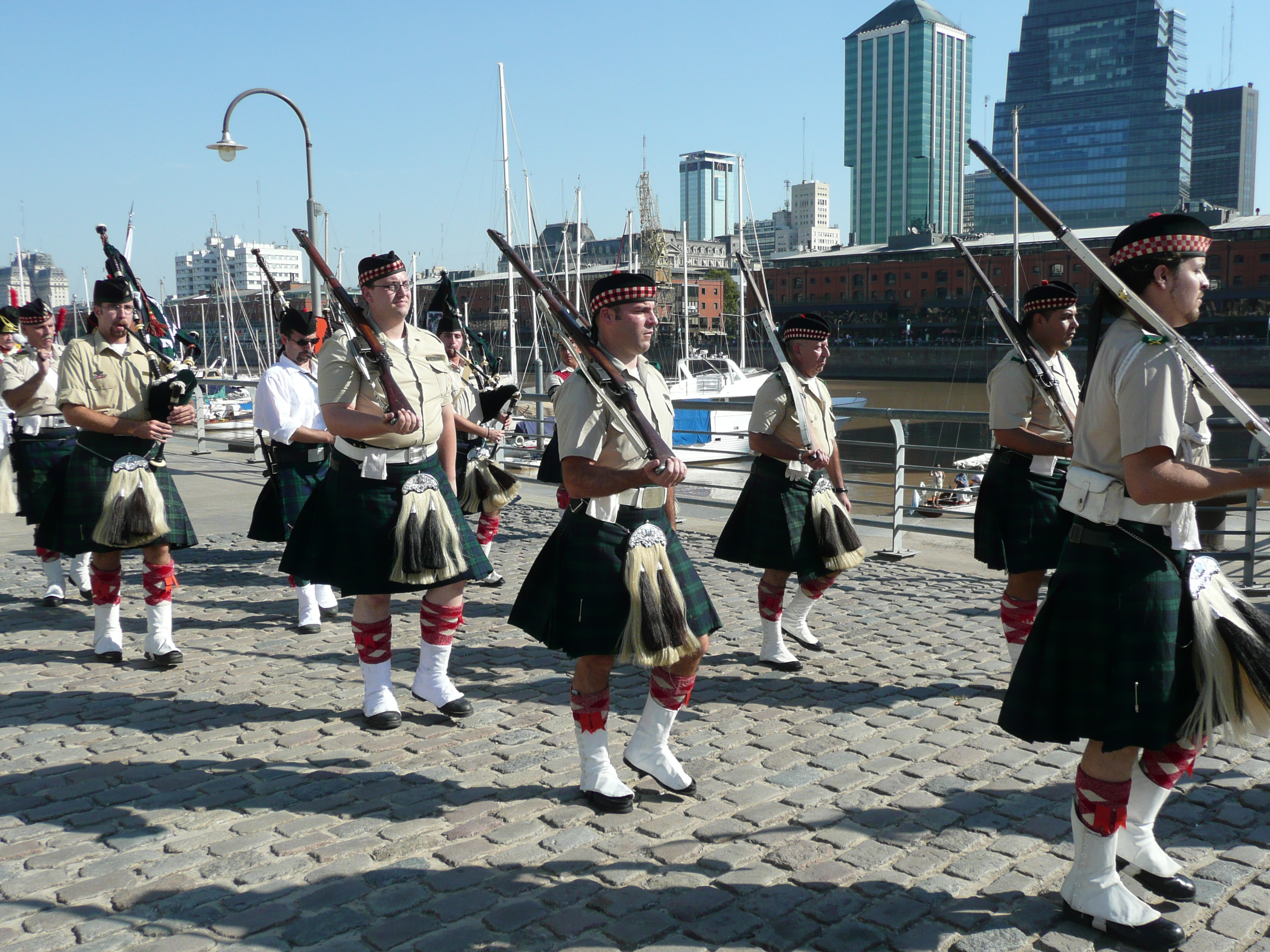
Tartan Day parade in Buenos Aires, 2018

Argentina has around 100,000 people of Scottish descent, the largest such community outside the English-speaking world. The Tartan Day parade of Scottish porteños was inaugurated in Buenos Aires on 6 April 2006 and is organized by the Scottish Argentine Society every year. A symbolic key to the gate of Arbroath's Abbey is carried to mark the date in 1320 that inspired this celebration.

=== Australia and New Zealand ===
Three million Australians are either Scottish or of Scottish descent. International Tartan Day in Australia is celebrated on a regional basis in most states on 1 July (or by some community organizations on the nearest Sunday), the anniversary of the Repeal Proclamation of 1782 annulling the Act of Proscription 1746 and its Dress Act, which had made wearing Highland dress (by males) an offense in the Highlands, punishable by up to seven years' penal transportation. According to Scottish House secretary Moyna Scotland, the tendency to disguise Scottish associations was mirrored in Australia: "Scots did what they were told to do when they came to Australia, assimilate and integrate, and they almost disappeared"; consequently, one aim of Tartan Day is to help Australians reconnect with their Scottish ancestry. A tartan revival started in Scotland in 1822, and now many of the Australian states, and the Commonwealth of Australia itself, have their own tartans.

In 1989, the Scottish Australian Heritage Council began to encourage Australians to wear tartan on July 1, when more than half a million Australians gather for a celebration of Scottish heritage, combining nostalgia with Australian citizenship ceremonies, and fund-raising for charitable causes such as drought assistance. Australians without a family tartan are invited to wear the royal Stewart tartan or the military tartan of the Black Watch. Tartan articles worn on the day include hats, ties, and socks. There are many pipe band associations in both Australia and New Zealand, some originating in disbanded Second World War army battalions, and almost 30 heritage events in Australia alone. Some clans, notably the McLeods of South Australia, come together in private events to honor their chief, recite Robert Burns, consume haggis, and take part in Highland dancing. A butcher in Maclean, New South Wales, "the Scottish town in Australia", reportedly celebrates the day by selling haggisburgers.

Since 2001, the Scottish Australian Heritage Council and Australian branch of the Scottish National Party have petitioned the Government of Australia in the capital, Canberra, for federal recognition of International Tartan Day to celebrate the Scottish contribution to Australian history, including the influence of Scottish radicalism on the trade-union movement and the Labor Party, and Australia's allegedly "egalitarian and meritocratic" society. In 2008, Scottish culture minister Linda Fabiani floated a proposal to expand the Australian event into an official Scotland Week as part of the Scottish government's international business strategy.

With high Scottish ancestry, New Zealand unofficially celebrates International Tartan Day on 1 July each year, since 2008.

=== Canada ===
About 15.1% or 4.7 million Canadians claim Scottish descent. Tartan Day (French: Journée du Tartan) in Canada, first held in Nova Scotia in 1987, originated with a proposal by Bill Crowell and Jean MacKeracher-Watson at a meeting of the Federation of Scottish Clans in Nova Scotia on March 9, 1986.

MacKeracher-Watson, president of the Clan Lamont Society of Canada, petitioned provincial legislatures to recognize April 6 as Tartan Day. The first such proclamation was by Nova Scotia in April 1987. On December 19, 1991, in response to action initiated by the Clans & Scottish Societies of Canada, the Ontario Legislature passed a resolution proclaiming 6 April as Tartan Day, following the example of some other Canadian provinces. Tartan Day has since been proclaimed by all the provincial legislatures. In 2007, Peter Stoffer introduced a private member's bill for "An Act respecting a Tartan Day". Progress of the bill was interrupted by the 2008 election; resubmitted after the election, it was unsuccessful.

Canada declared National Tartan Day in October 2010, the first official national event being held in 2011. In the national capital, Ottawa, Ontario, an annual Gathering of the Clans takes place each year, usually on April 6 or the Sunday nearest to it, on Parliament Hill at noon with pipes, drums, and dancing hosted by the Sons of Scotland Pipe Band, Canada's oldest civilian pipe band. The 2023 celebrations were on April 23, and were the 15th year that the pipe band has hosted the event. Canada's official tartan, the Maple Leaf tartan, was designed in 1964 and became an official national symbol in March 2011 ahead of Tartan Day.

In 2015, Minister of Canadian Heritage Shelly Glover issued a statement in support of National Tartan Day and the Maple Leaf tartan, and tied the event to celebration that year of the 200th anniversary of the birth of the first prime minister of Canada, Sir John A. Macdonald (born in Scotland), and the 50th anniversary of the current flag of Canada, among other events. Glover wrote of "the contributions of the Scots and their descendants to the social fabric of our country" and "the historical links between Scotland and Canada".

=== France ===
Starting in 2002, the France Celtic Tartan Day (Jour du tartan celtique en France or "Le Tartan Day"), also called Day of the Kilt (Journée du kilt) and Festival of Scotland and the Kilt (Fête de l’Ecosse et du kilt), was held in France. Originally founded by Richard and Marie Laure, the event developed into a collaboration between L’Équipe du France Celtic Tartan Day (a not-for-profit organization formed for the purpose by its president Jean-François Rebiffé) and Jeux Ecossais de Luzarches (the Highland games association in Luzarches). The locations have varied by year, and have sometimes been spread over three days instead of a single Tartan Day; e.g., the 7th annual event of 2009 was organized for the "sister" cities of Eu, Mers-les-Bains, and Le Tréport on the borders of Normandy and Picardy; the 2007 edition also included Criel-sur-Mer. Events included a beachfront parade, musical concerts, piping competitions, Highland games, kilt fashion show, and a Franco-Scottish economic roundtable. Organizers claimed attendance from Brittany, Normandy and elsewhere in France, Scotland, Ireland, Wales, and the Isle of Man. This particular series of Tartan Day events appears to have ended in 2009.

Tartan day has also been celebrated in Paris for several years, organized by the Kilt Society de France. A one-off event was held in Brocéliande (Paimpont) forest before 2015. Starting in 2015, there had also been an annual event in Brittany, called Breizh Tartan Deizh ('Breton Tartan Day' in the Breton language); this event was organized by an association named Hentou Breizh ('Breton Paths') along with l’Association Château Essor Blinois. Held at the castle Château de la Groulais in Blain (though not always on April 6), it featured a parade through that city, music and dancing, and a crafts fair. The event celebrated Breton culture as well as Scottish, and the links between the two Celtic nations. Richard Duclos, designer of the first Breton national tartan, originated both the Paris and Brittany events. The Breton event seems to have last been held in 2018, and to have been subsumed into a broader Festival Celtique in Plessé (along with another Festival Celtique in Gévaudan), and a Breton and Celtic event named Festiv'Arz in Arzal.

=== Scotland ===
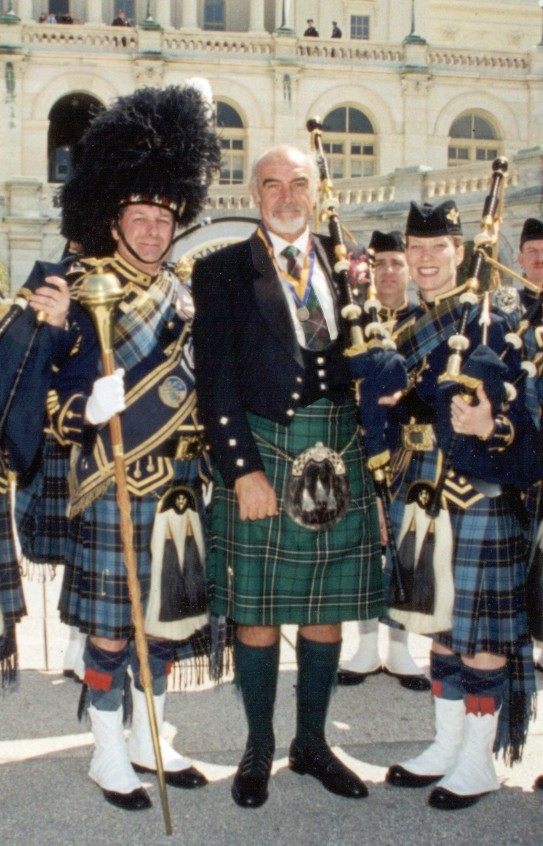
Scottish actor, Sir Sean Connery, with members of the USAF Reserve Pipes and Drums, at the 2004 Tartan Day celebrations in Washington, DC. Connery wore a kilt made with the hunting tartan of his mother's Clan Maclean.

Angus, a region that includes Arbroath, established the first Tartan Day festival in Scotland on April 6, 2004, and has since joined other regional councils in attempting to develop its potential as a global celebration. The Angus event, like that in New York, has developed into a full Tartan Week, and has included activities such as exhibitions of local arts and crafts, a farmer's market, local food vendors and formal dinners, a gathering of clans, a golf tournament, archery competition, literary and storytelling events, medieval reenactments, traditional piping and other music, dance (competitive and participatory), regional history exhibitions and presentations, and craft workshops.

From 2004 through 2013, the city of Aberdeen also organized a Tartan Day, though in 2016 it changed into a charity walkathon fundraiser named the Kiltwalk (run by a registered charitable organization), which has since spread to Edinburgh, Glasgow, and Dundee in Scotland (held at different dates throughout the year so as not to conflict), and, for a one-off event, to New York City in the US.

Since 2017, the Scottish Government's official Scotland.org and VisitScotland.org portal sites have sometimes re-branded Tartan Day/Week as "Scotland Week" for marketing the events to native Scots, though "Tartan Day/Week" has also remained in use in such materials.

Since 2016, the 6 April date has increasingly been promoted instead as Declaration Day, since the Declaration of Arbroath is seen as having more national and historical significance than tartans (primarily associated with the Scottish Highlands), and 2020 marked the 700th anniversary of the declaration. In 2016, the town of Arbroath, the Angus Council, the VisitScotland tourism board, and Historic Environment Scotland formed the body Arbroath 2020, in association with the Friends of Arbroath Abbey organisation, for the construction of a Declaration Square in front of Arbroath Abbey for the anniversary; Arbroath 2020's chairman Norman Atkinson appears to have coined the name "Declaration Day" in 2016, as an explicit "rebrand" of the date. The 2020 anniversary event proceeded, but had to be scaled back from the original plan due to the COVID-19 pandemic. The name continues to be used especially for events at Arbroath, where the celebration has expanded beyond its original scope, and now includes a mile-long parade among other activities, promoted as "a non-political event ... that blends history, culture, and community spirit".

=== United States ===
There are an estimated 25 million people in the US who are of Scottish descent. Observing various Tartan Day activities in Canada and in the US at the state and county level, a March 8–10, 1996, meeting of Scottish-heritage organization leaders chaired by John H. Napier III, which included Duncan MacDonald of the Caledonian Foundation, and Neil Fraser of the Clans and Scottish Societies of Canada, among others, proposed nationalizing the idea in the US, to unanimous approval of the attendees. After promotional advertisements were placed in heritage and genealogy publications including The Highlander, Scottish Life, and Family Tree, the first (unofficial) Tartan Day in the United States observed at the national level was on April 6, 1997. Wanting to make the holiday official, the Scottish Coalition USA (comprising the American-Scottish Foundation, the Association of Scottish Games and Festivals, the Council of Scottish Clans & Associations, Living Legacy of Scotland, the Scottish-American Military Society, and Scottish Heritage USA, and at that time also including the now-defunct Tartan Educational and Cultural Association) held a second Sarasota meeting in 1997 to more formally establish a National Tartan Day.

In 1998, the efforts of the coalition and the Caledonian Foundation (led then by JoAnne Phipps), with the legislative sponsorship of Senator Trent Lott, resulted in United States Senate Resolution No. 155 (introduced March 6, 1998) to adopt April 6 as National Tartan Day. The resolution passed March 20, 1998, "to recognize the outstanding achievements and contributions made by Scottish Americans to the United States"; it also referred to the predominance of Scots among the Founding Fathers of the United States and claimed that the American Declaration of Independence was "modelled on" the Scottish Declaration of Arbroath. The now quasi-official National Tartan Day was held annually thereafter; The Washington Times reported in 2000 on the event, by which time it was already growing into a three-day affair in Washington, DC.

This led in turn, through the advocacy of the National Capital Tartan Committee (led by James Morrison), to unanimous adoption of US House of Representatives Resolution 41 passing on March 9, 2005, in favor of a US National Tartan Day on April 6, and mirroring most of the wording of the Senate resolution. The House resolution's chief sponsors were Representative Mike McIntyre from North Carolina and Rep. Jimmy Duncan from Tennessee, who were the founding co-chairs of the Friends of Scotland Caucus in the House. Finally, President George W. Bush signed a presidential proclamation on April 4, 2008, of a fully official US National Tartan Day observance on April 6 each year.

The largest of the US events is New York City Tartan Week. Another major one is that held in Washington, DC, which includes a National Tartan Day Symposium featuring notable Scottish and Scottish-American speakers.

==== New York City Tartan Week ====
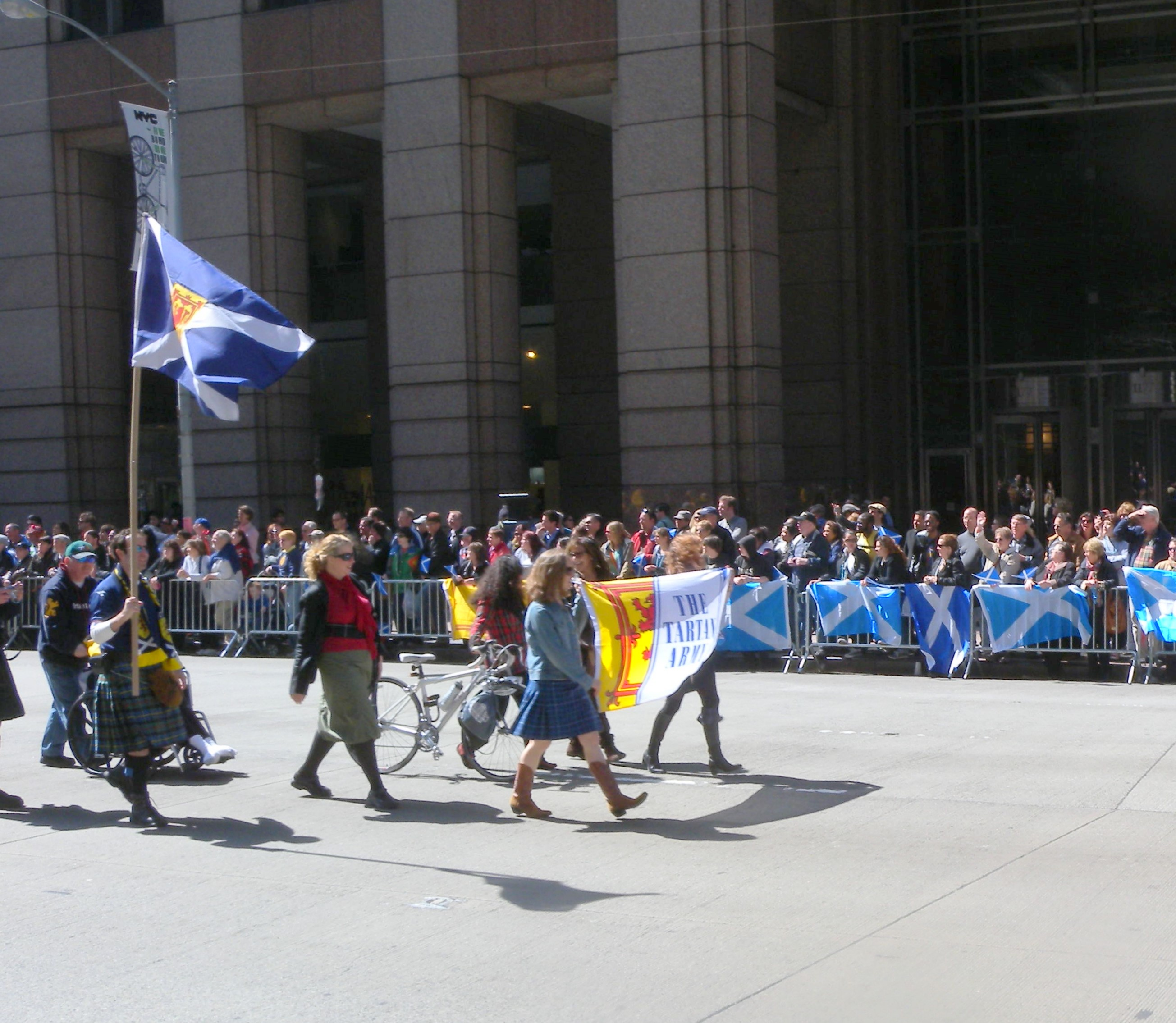
Tartan Day parade in New York City, 2011

1n 1999, the first Tartan Day parade in New York City consisted of just two pipe bands and "a small but enthusiastic group of Scottish Americans", with American actor Cliff Robertson in the role of grand marshall. By 2002, the "ScottishPower Tunes of Glory" parade, organized by Scottish pipers Magnus Orr and Thomas Grotrian, included 8,250 pipers and drummers marching through the streets of New York, led by Scottish actor Sir Sean Connery and New York City Mayor Michael Bloomberg. Other organizers of the annual affair include the Saint Andrews Society of the State of New York, the New York Caledonian Club, and the American Scottish Foundation.

The event has since grown into a Tartan Week beginning with Tartan Day (the parade is held on the week's Saturday). The grand marshall each year is usually a Scotland-native celebrity (actor Gail Porter in 2023), but has occasionally been a Scottish American. The parade includes pipe bands (typically around 3,000 bagpipers in total), and contingents from clan societies, Highland games organizers, Scottish-American societies, the New York Mounted Police, alumni clubs of Scottish universities, and Scotland's tourism board, VisitScotland. Activities and events other than the parade include literary, theatrical, and musical performances; receptions; art exhibits of Scottish and Scottish-American works; music concerts and pipe band competitions; cèilidh, Highland, and Scottish country dances; since 2004, the Scotland Run, a 10K run (sponsored by the Scottish Government with New York Road Runners, and a pre-qualifying race for the New York City Marathon); displays of Scottish artifacts; exhibitions of Scottish dog breeds; and Dressed to Kilt, a fashion show and charity ball organized by Friends of Scotland, featuring tartaned and kilted celebrities.

The event has not been without some criticism. Susan McIntosh, a former president of the Council of Scottish Clans & Associations (based in North Carolina) said in 2015 that the event was too thinly attended and media-covered, given its potential, compared to other ethnic celebrations, and an "unfortunate mongrel of a commemoration" because the dates of the parade (on a Saturday nearest April 6 but rarely April 6 itself) are not meaningful to Scots, and because, she stated, the connection between the Declaration of Arbroath and the Declaration of Independence "is faint at best". McIntosh recommended starting over to create a new, grassroots and international, diaspora-driven holiday. The Scotsman also that year quoted an anonymous promoter in Edinburgh saying that Tartan Day "doesn't resonate with young Scots", including designers who will not attend the events because they don't find them "relevant". Alan Bain of the American Scottish Foundation, at Tartan Day organizer, disagreed because Scottish universities were sending parade contingents, indicating contemporary interest in Scotland.

== Scottish Government engagement in diasporic events ==
=== Government involvement ===
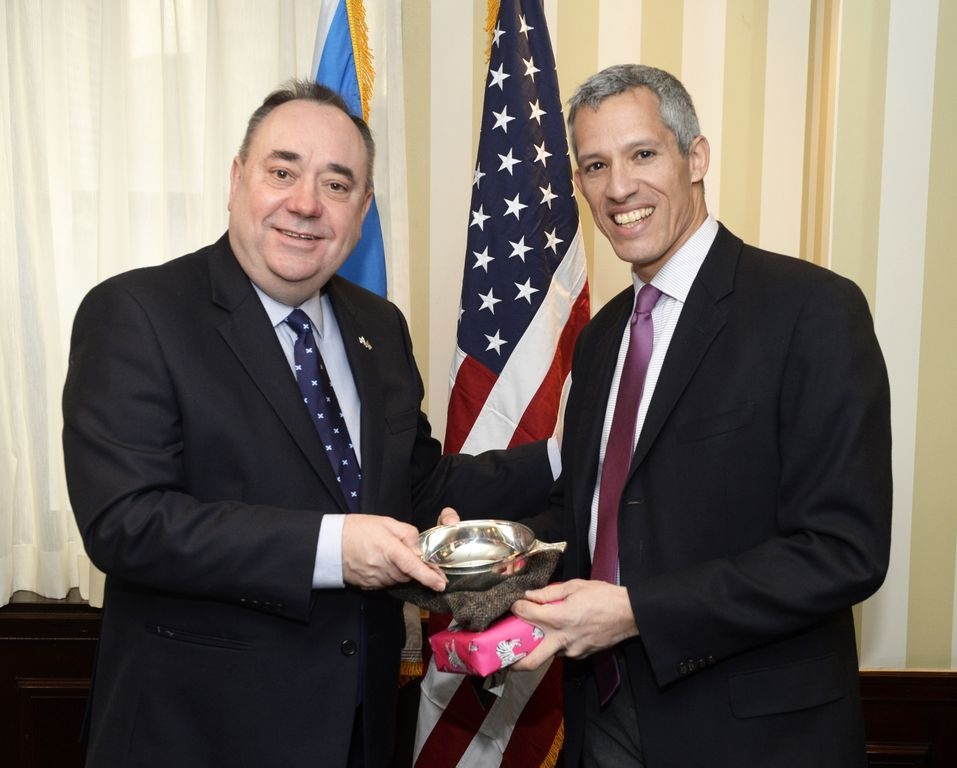
First Minister of Scotland, Alex Salmond, during engagements in the United States during Scotland Week engagements in 2013

The Scottish Government, along with regional local governments including the city councils of Edinburgh, Glasgow, and Aberdeen, as well as industry organisations, have capitalised on opportunities to promote Scottish tourism and business interests by directly participating in Tartan Day/Week activities among the disaspora, especially in the United States, since the 2000s. The US is Scotland's top destination for exports, which as of 2019 amounted to £6 billion, 17% of Scotland's total international trade.

Scottish officials have participated in Tartan Day activities, e.g. as grand marshals of the New York parade, including presiding officers of Scottish Parliament (George Reid in 2007, Alex Fergusson in 2010, and Tricia Marwick in 2015), and Lord Provost of Glasgow Bob Winter in 2011. The Scottish Parliament sent a delegation to the 2023 New York event, including MSPs Alison Johnstone (the presiding officer), Finlay Carson, and Collette Stevenson, who also visited the Canadian Parliament in Ottawa and the National Assembly of Québec. Scottish First Minister Jack McConnell attended the New York event in 2002 "to make sure that Scotland is promoted at the highest level during a time when the world will be watching." Also in New York, First Min. Alex Salmond in 2013 cross-promoted events in Scotland, especially the year-long Homecoming Scotland 2014, a followup to the 2009 event series. Former First Min. Henry McLeish gave a Scotland post-Brexit presentation at Tartan Day in Washington, DC, in 2021. Angus Robertson, the Scottish culture secretary, attended 2022 Tartan Day in Ontario, Canada, and Tartan Week in New York and Washington, DC, in the US, meeting also with political bodies, business leaders, and cultural organizations, with a goal of bolstering "cultural, historical, educational and economic links between Scotland, Canada and the United States". Robertson wrote April 2023 editorials in The Scotsman and the Edinburgh Evening News on Tartan Day abroad leading to job creation in Scotland, and called the holiday "an opportunity to promote enduring connections with Scotland, including trade, investment, tourism and culture" and "a platform ... to promote Scotland in some of our most important markets". The 2023 National Tartan Day Symposium in Washington, DC, included a presentation from Chris Thomson, head of the Scottish Government USA consular team. The UK Government's parliamentary under-secretary of state for Scotland, John Lamont, also attended the New York Tartan Day events of 2023, including a roundtable organized by the UK Department for Business and Trade.

=== Promotion of Scottish culture ===
The Scottish Government has promoted Scottish culture and talent at foreign Tartan Days/Weeks, including the National Theatre of Scotland, the National Trust for Scotland, the National Galleries Scotland, and Scottish universities.< The government has also sponsored the annual 10K Scotland Run (with a trip to Edinburgh as the prize) during Tartan Week in New York City since 2004. In 2005, the government lent the Wallace Sword – an artifact purported to have been wielded by Scottish hero William Wallace in the 13th to early 14th centuries – for Tartan Week display at Grand Central Terminal in New York City. The sword had never before left Scotland in modern times. VisitScotland, the Scottish tourism board, has a contingent in the annual New York Tartan Day parade, and also hosts side events sponsored by and featuring Scottish brands. Scotland.org, variously branded "Gateway to Scotland" and "Scotland Is Now", a tourism, study-abroad, and immigration website partnership between various departments of the government and industry associations, has publicized diasporic Tartan Day events, including 23 across the US, though the website no longer provides a detailed catalog of events as of 2023, and just has general information about Canadian Tartan Day and New York Tartan Week.

=== Business promotion ===
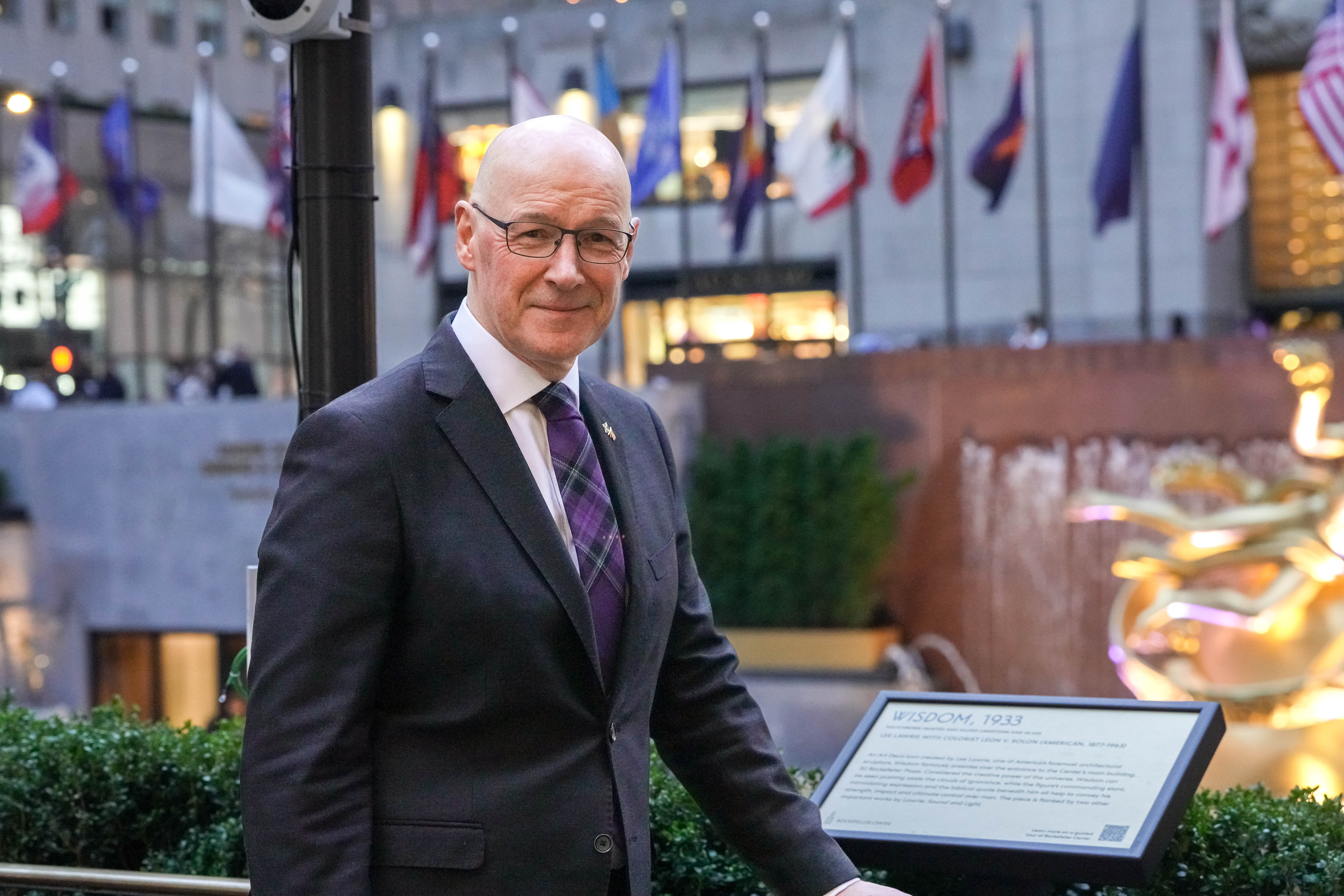
First Minister John Swinney at Rockefeller Plaza during Tartan Day business meetings, April 2025

The Scotlish Government's involvement in Tartan Day/Week is connected with other governmental works, including GlobalScot (founded 2001), an international business network to help Scottish businesses and entrepreneurs with worldwide business connections; and Scottish Connections Framework, (since 2023), a program for outreach to members of the diaspora who want "to live, work, study, visit, or do business in Scotland". The Tartan Day/Week activities also interrelate with Scotland's US Engagement Strategy of 2017, and a Diaspora Engagement Plan published in 2010 which includes other countries.

Scottish businesses have integrated Tartan Day/Week into their marketing efforts, both online and at the events. A few examples include: the tartan weaver and women's clothier Prickly Thistle, of Evanton and Edinburgh; the Gin Bothy distillery in Glamis; Harris Tweed Textiles on the Isle of Lewis; the Johnnie Walker distillery (Kilmarnock / London); Walker's Shortbread (Aberlour); the Salmon Scotland trade association (Edinburgh); and Scotch Whisky Association (Edinburgh). For 2022, the Stirling-based Forth Valley Chamber of Commerce alone sent 13 Scottish businesses to the New York parade, including Angels' Share Glass, Ardgowan Distillery, Ochil Fudge Pantry, and Quirky Chocolate. Ian Houston, president of the trade association Scottish Business Network (SBN); John Bleed, US director of the Confederation of British Industry; and Peter Wilson, president of Great Scot International, a wholesale supplier of Scottish goods to US retailers, were all presenters at the Washington, DC, Tartan Day Sympoisum in 2023. SBN, Scottish Development International, and British–American Business Network have all been directly involved in Tartan Day activities in Texas. SNB's "The New York Scottish Challenge" business seminar for Scottish entrepreneurs includes representation in the Tartan Day parade.

== See also ==
- Kirkin' o' the Tartan, a ceremony involving the blessing of family tartans
