= Alexander Kirk =

Alexander Kirk may refer to:

- Alexander Carnegie Kirk (1830–1892), Scottish engineer
- Alexander Comstock Kirk (1888–1979), American diplomat

== See also ==
- Alejandro Kirk (born 1998), Mexican baseball player
- Kirk (surname)
- A.C. Kirk (disambiguation)
