= Concordia University Texas =

Private university in Austin, Texas, U.S.

- Former names: Lutheran Concordia College of Texas (1926–1955); Concordia Lutheran College (1955–1995); Concordia University at Austin (1995–2007)
- Motto: "Developing Christian Leaders"
- Type: Private university
- Established: 1926; 100 years ago
- Religious affiliation: Independent Lutheran
- Endowment: US$13.3 million
- President: Kristi Kirk
- Students: 2,565
- Undergraduates: 1,531
- Postgraduates: 1,034
- Location: Austin, Texas, US; 30°25′12″N 97°50′13″W
- Campus: 380 acres (150 ha); Suburban
- Colors: Purple and gold
- Nickname: Tornados
- Sporting affiliations: NCAA Division III – SCAC
- Website: concordia.edu
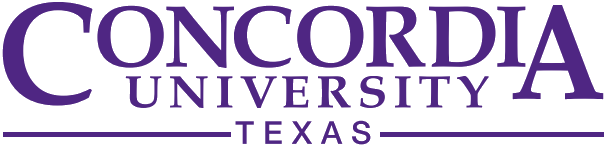

Concordia University Texas is a private university in Austin, Texas, United States. The university offers undergraduate, graduate, and online degrees as well as an adult degree program for part-time and returning students.

Concordia University Texas was affiliated with the Lutheran Church–Missouri Synod (LCMS) and a member of the Concordia University System (CUS)—the six-member association of LCMS colleges and universities—until November 2022, after which it adopted a new governance structure independent from the LCMS and CUS. As a Lutheran university, Concordia's stated mission is to develop Christian leaders.

== History ==
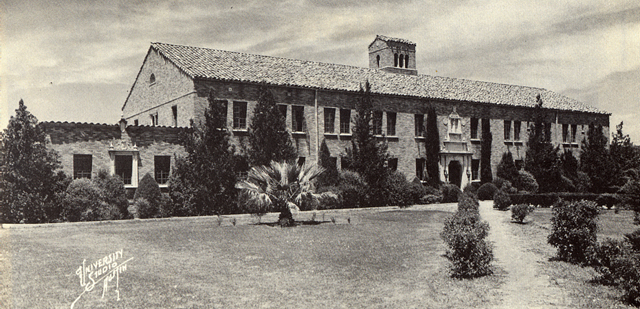
Historic Kilian Hall

Concordia was founded in 1926 as "Lutheran Concordia College of Texas", a four-year high school that prepared young men for careers in ministry and teaching. The school opened with 26 students on its original site along East Avenue (now Interstate 35) on the then northern outskirts of Austin, Texas. In 1929, a two-story classroom building, later called the Music Building, and still later known as College Central, was built.

Concordia was founded by members of Texas's Wendish immigrant community. The original main building, Kilian Hall, is named for John Kilian, founder of the first Texas Lutheran church associated with the LCMS and leader of a large group of Wends (also called Sorbs) who settled in the Serbin area. Today, between 10 and 15 percent of Concordia's faculty, staff and students are of Wendish heritage.

Throughout the 1940s and 1950s, many buildings were added to the campus, such as Hirschi Memorial Library and Kramer Hall, the college's first fully air-conditioned classroom building. Also in 1951, Concordia started using a two-year junior college curriculum.

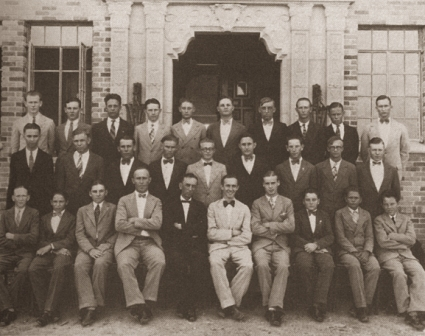
Old photograph of Concordia faculty in front of Kilian Hall

Building developments on campus continued throughout the 1950s and 1960s. The campus built its chapel, named Birkmann Memorial Chapel, in 1952. Texas Hall, which housed dining services and faculty offices was dedicated in 1953. Studtmann Hall, an all-girl's dormitory opened in 1955. The first Beto Hall on the Concordia campus was built in 1969 and housed science labs. In the early 21st century, this building was converted into the school's mail services facility.

In 1955, Concordia admitted women as students for the first time and the institution changed its name to "Concordia Lutheran College" in 1965. In 1969, the four-year high school program was disbanded and Concordia's curriculum expanded to four years after receiving permission to award Bachelor of Arts degrees in 1980.

Concordia joined the Concordia University System (CUS) in 1993. The CUS represents the colleges and universities run by the LCMS. In 1995, the name of the institution was changed to "Concordia University at Austin". The Accelerated Degree Program (ADP), with sites in Austin, Fort Worth, Houston, and San Antonio, within the College of Adult Education, was launched in 1995 to offer working adults the opportunity to earn a degree. Harms Hall, a dormitory, opened in January 2000, more than doubling campus resident capacity. The first graduate program was developed during this period.

In 2002, Thomas E. Cedel was named president of the university.

In 2007, Concordia University at Austin changed its name to "Concordia University Texas".

Relations between the University and the LCMS leadership declined throughout the 2010s and 2020s. While multiple issues were involved, loosely speaking the Board of Regents wanted to refocus around the more successful areas of the school, such as business, education, and nursing training. This would potentially mean making cuts to the religion program, which has seen far fewer students in preseminary education than in earlier decades. In November 2022, the Concordia University Texas Board of Regents voted "to adopt a structure whereby Concordia University Texas will be governed solely by its Board of Regents, rather than the historic governance directed by the bylaws of Synod." This vote was accompanied by amending the institution's certificate of formation with the state of Texas, effectively reorganizing its board and removing any governance control by the LCMS. This change in governance was reaffirmed by the Board of Regents in April 2023. In September 2023, the LCMS filed a complaint in federal court seeking to overturn this action.

== New campus ==
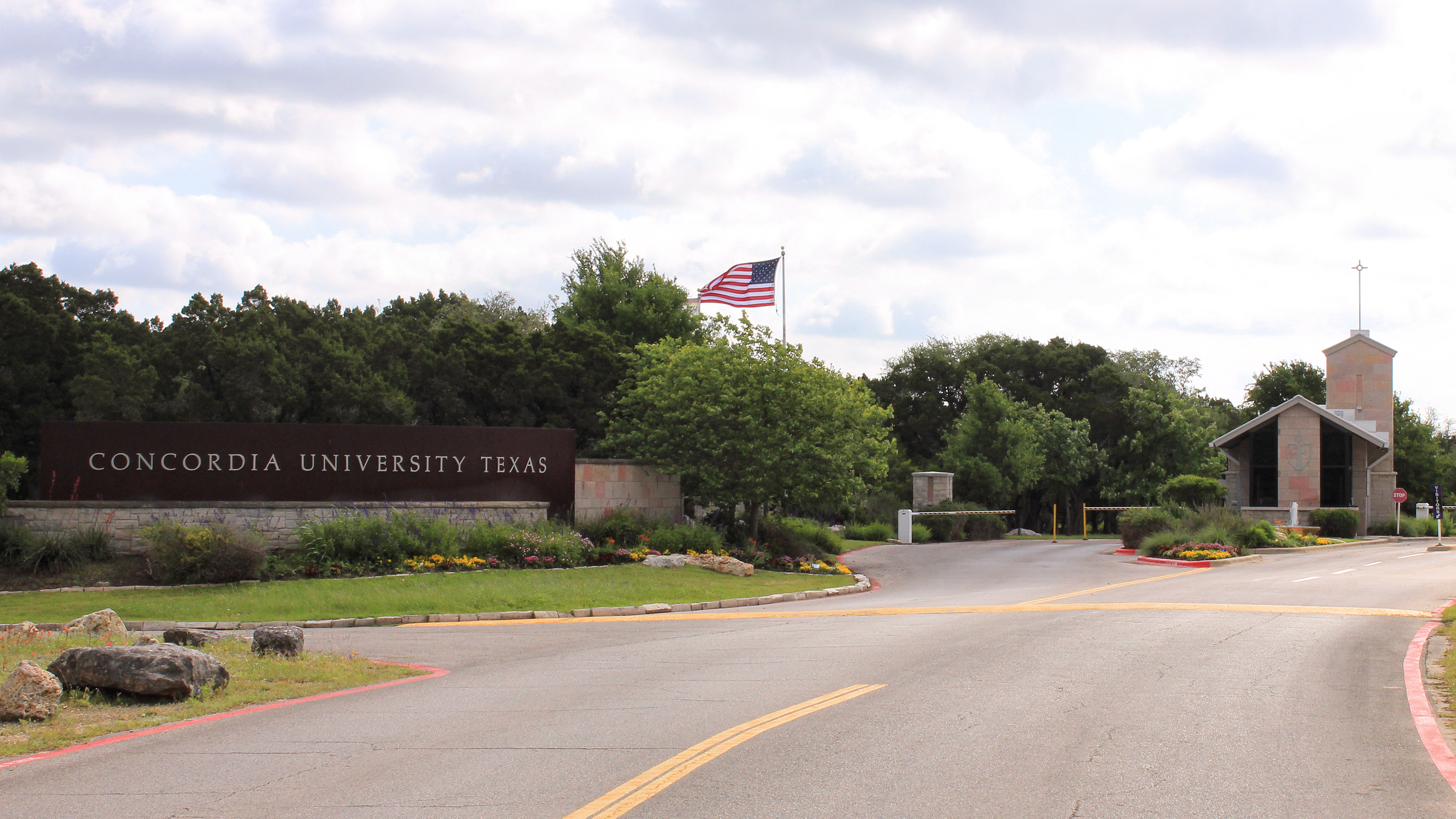
Main entrance

In 2005, the Board of Regents approved the relocation of the Concordia University Texas campus. Since its founding the school had occupied a 23-acre (9.3 ha) campus near downtown Austin. The new campus is located in northwest Austin on 384 acres (155 ha) of land. Construction began in the spring of 2007. The new campus opened in July 2008. Classes began there in September of that year, with its formal dedication on October 26, 2008.

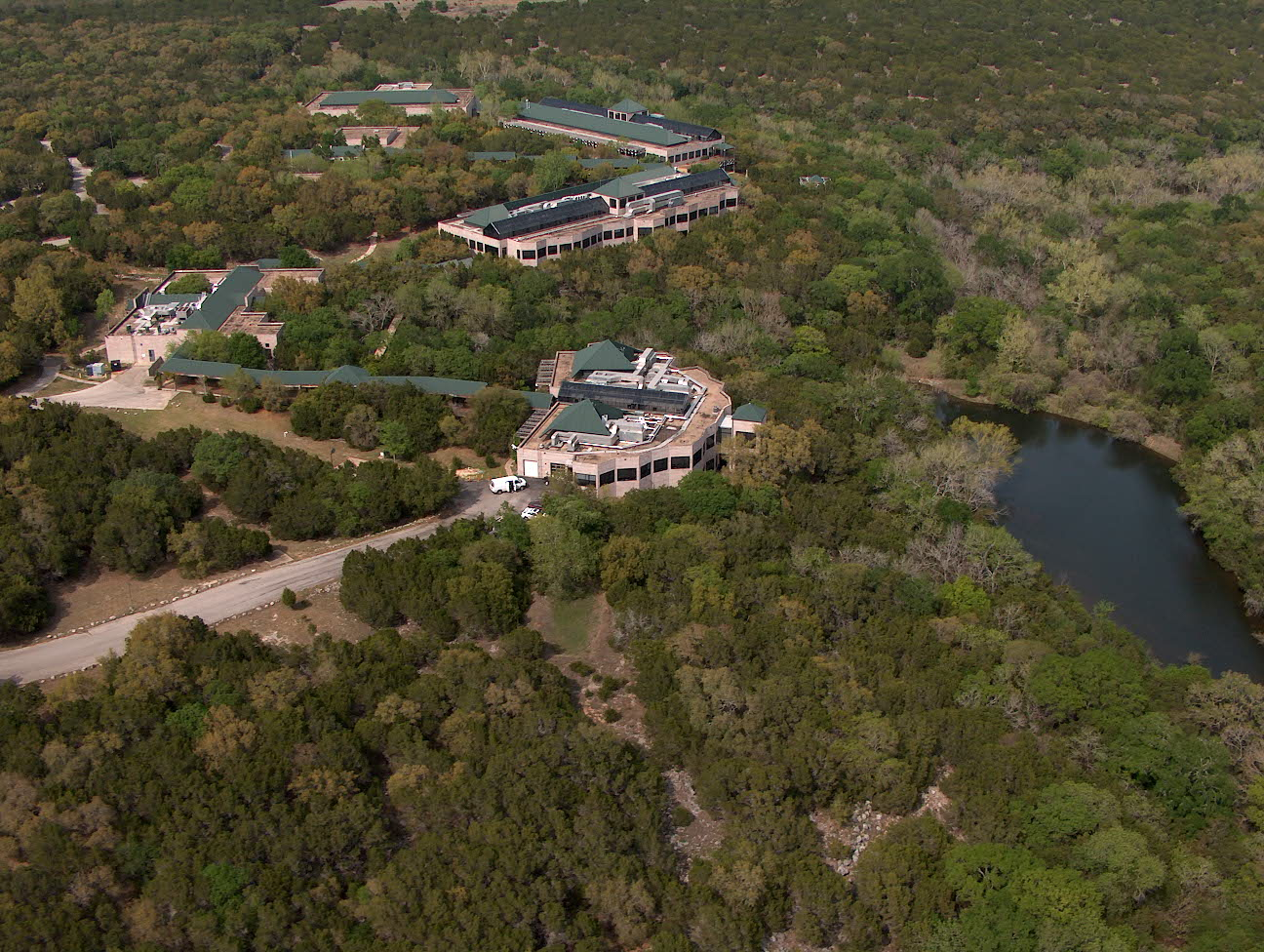
Aerial view of Concordia University's new campus in Northwest Austin

The city of Austin allowed the demolition of the former campus. A developer bought the space with plans to construct a mixed-use development; however, the developer filed for bankruptcy in 2011.

The site for Concordia's new campus is the former Schlumberger Austin Systems Center. The site, formerly a research and development facility, had six buildings connected by covered walkways and encircled by a nature trail. The six buildings, named with the letters A–F, while extensively renovated, retain their basic design and features, including solid oak trim, large windows, sky lights, and atria.

Three new structures were built prior to occupation of the new campus: student housing, a fieldhouse, and a front entry/guard house. In addition to the new structures, 600 additional parking spaces and new roads were built to handle the increased campus traffic. In 2014, Concordia broke ground on a softball field that was completed in 2016.

The campus includes a 250-acre (100 ha) nature preserve. A 10-A federal permit is required and only one other higher education institution carries one. The inclusion of the nature preserve allows Concordia to devote time to urban environmentalism in the Austin community. The Concordia University Nature Preserve is part of the Balcones Canyonlands Preserve, a system of preserves in western Travis County that provides habitat for a number of rare and endangered plant and animal species such the Golden-cheeked warbler and Black-capped vireo, two rare species of songbirds.

In 2013, Thomas E. Cedel, announced his retirement from Concordia University Texas. In 2014, the former dean of the College of Business, Don Christian, was named chief executive officer.

== Academics ==
Concordia University Texas has majors, minors, and programs of study within four colleges: Business & Communication, Nursing (accredited by the Texas Nursing Board and CCNE), Education, and Arts & Sciences. Concordia is accredited by the Southern Association of Colleges and Schools Commission on Colleges.

== Campus life ==
Some of the many clubs and organizations that students participate in are: Concordia University Texas Collegiate DECA, Concordia Outdoor Ministry, Service-Learning, Missions Club, Communication Club, Student Government & Leadership Association (SGLA), Concordia Youth Ministry Team (CYMT), Fellowship of Christian Athletes, Helping Hands, History Club, Preseminarians of CTX, Society for Human Resource Management, Psychology Book Club, Kinesiology Club, Financial Management Association, Education Club, Directors of Christian Education Club, Biology Club, Behavioral Sciences Club, Association for Computing Machinery, Academic Advising Consultants, Model Organization of American States (MOAS), Moot Court, and the Spirit Squad. The school newspaper, The Mullet, was first published in 2006, and in 2013 was renamed The Spin. The Spin is published once a month during the semester.

== Athletics ==
Concordia athletics wordmark

The Concordia athletics teams are nicknamed the Tornados and the school colors are purple and gold. Concordia's intercollegiate athletic teams participated in NCAA Division III's American Southwest Conference (ASC) from 1999 up until 2024, where they opted to move to the Southern Collegiate Athletic Conference (SCAC). Concordia adopted the Tornados mascot in 1995, the year the school renamed itself; its previous team names were the Outlaws (1926-1936), the Cardinals (1936-1951), and the Stags (1951-1995). Prior to moving to NCAA Division III and joining the ASC, the Stags/Tornados were members of the National Association of Intercollegiate Athletics Heart of Texas Conference from 1994 to 1999.

The athletic programs at Concordia are baseball, softball, men's basketball, women's basketball, cross country, golf, men's and women's soccer, track and field, volleyball, tennis and athletic training. There were four athletic facilities on the old campus (Fascholz-Keller Field (baseball), Bartholomew Park (softball), Pharr Tennis Center, Woltman Gymnasium) and one off-campus (St. Francis School (soccer)). Currently, men's and women's soccer play at Round Rock Multipurpose Complex.

In spring 2011, "Purple Out" events were started to encourage students, staff, and the community to support athletics. On designated "Purple Out" days, everyone is encouraged to wear purple and those attending a sporting event receive purple "Tornado Towels". In 2011–2012, Concordia Texas experienced its most successful year athletically. This was accomplished by winning ASC Championships in women's cross country, women's basketball, and men's baseball (second consecutive championship).

=== Basketball ===
In the 2011–2012 season, the Concordia University Texas' women's basketball team won the American Southwest Conference.

The Concordia Men's basketball team has been coached by Stanley Bonewitz Jr. since 2004. He is a former Texas Tech basketball standout. As a player, he was named Texas "Mr. Basketball" in 1995.

=== Baseball ===
The Concordia men's baseball team is coached by Clint Mokry, who was hired in December 2022 following the death of former major leaguer Tommy Boggs. Coach Boggs led the team to victory in 2011 as the ASC Conference Champions, and later to the NCAA championship tournament where they fell two games short of advancing to the College World Series. In 2012, the team recorded its best record ever and swept the ASC conference tournament to win the conference title outright for a second consecutive year. Prior to Boggs' tenure, Mike Gardner had been head coach since 1998. He retired at the end of the 2009 season as the winningest coach in school baseball history and led the team to its only appearance in the College World Series in 2002. Tornado Field, home of the baseball team, debuted on the new campus in February 2011 and was dedicated in April 2011.

=== Other sports ===
Chris Randle became the first student athlete from Concordia to qualify for the NCAA track and field championship tournament. His 6-foot-7-inch (201 cm) high jump earned him a sixth-place finish in the tournament. Randle's participation marked the first time in school history that Concordia was represented at the NCAA Division III Championships in two sports during the same academic year, as the baseball team won the ASC title and won two games over nationally ranked opponents – Linfield and Redlands – at the West Regional.

== Alumni ==
- Kristi Kirk, academic administrator
- Scott Linebrink, baseball player
- Richard John Neuhaus, theologian and cultural commentator
- Austin St. John, actor and paramedic, Mighty Morphin Power Rangers
- Randy Phillips, musician, of Phillips, Craig and Dean
