= Monica Allison =

American actress

Monica Allison is an actress and voice actor. She is perhaps best known for her role as Hazel Gordy in The Jacksons: An American Dream and the voice of Julie in The Adventures of Brer Rabbit.

== Personal life ==
Allison is the daughter of McDonald's executive Robert M. Beavers Jr., the first African-American on the company's board of directors. Allison is married to singer Martin Kember, a former member of R&B band Color Me Badd.

== Filmography ==
=== Film ===
| Year | Film | Role | Notes |
|---|---|---|---|
| 1992 | The Jacksons: An American Dream | Hazel Gordy | |
| 1995 | Virtuosity | Woman on Train | |
| 1995 | The Barefoot Executive | Jane | |
| 2004 | Heavy Put-Away | Sally | Short |
| 2005 | EverQuest II: Desert of Flames | Voice Unknown | Video Game |
| 2006 | The Adventures of Brer Rabbit | Julie | Starring Role |

=== Television ===
| Year | Title | Role | Notes |
|---|---|---|---|
| 1992 | The Golden Palace | Joanne | One Episode: Can't Stand Losing You |
| 1994 | Cobra | Role Unknown | One Episode: Death Dive |
| 1994 | South Central | Janice | One Episode: Date |
| 1994 | Dead at 21 | Nurse in Waiting Room | One Episode: Brain Salad |
| 1994 | CBS Schoolbreak Special | Reporter | One Episode: The Writing on the Wall |
| 1995 | The Fresh Prince of Bel-Air | Michelle | Two Episodes: The Script Formerly Known As... and Not, I Barbecue |
| 1995 | Mad About You | Sycophant #2 | One Episode: Yoko Said |
| 1995 | Gargoyles | Beth Maza | One Episode: The Cage |
| 1996 | Night Stand with Dick Dietrick | Twanda | One Episode: The Swallow Reunion |
| 1996 | Diagnosis: Murder | Brenda Arthur | One Episode: The Pressure to Murder |
| 1996 | Common Law | Sandy Garrett | One Episode: In the Matter of: John's Fifteen Minutes |
| 1996 | Bay Watch Nights | Doretha | One Episode: Night Whispers |
| 1996–1998 | Seinfeld | Stewardess and Gail | Two Episodes: The Puerto Rican Day and The Doll |
| 1997 | Martin | Brenda | Two Episodes: Goin' Overboard: Part 1 and Goin' Overboard: Part 2 |
| 1997 | Sunset Beach | LaShawnda | Two Episodes: Episode #1.32 and Episode #1.9 (Both Uncredited Roles) |
| 1997 | Melrose Place | Dr. Dee Johnson | One Episode: A Shot in the Dark |
| 1997 | The Jamie Foxx Show | Nurse | One Episode: Too Much Soul Food |
| 1997 | Jenny | Patty | One Episode: A Girl's Gotta Love a Wedding |
| 1999 | Beverly Hills, 90210 | Linda Philips | One Episode: I'm Married |
| 2000 | Charmed | Second Nurse | One Episode: Awakened |
| 2000 | The Hughleys | Shondrella | One Episode: The Girl That I Married |
| 2001 | The Steve Harvey Show | Candy | One Episode: Dual Intentions |
| 2001 | One on One | Belinda | One Episode: Thanksgiving It to Me, Baby |
| 2003 | Scrubs | Attractive Woman | One Episode: My Kingdom |
| 2012 | Chicago Fire | Guest at Baby Shower | One Episode: One Minute |
