= Şükürçü =

- Location within Azerbaijan
- Coordinates: 40°41′N 48°04′E
- Country: Azerbaijan
- Rayon: Ismailli
- Municipality: Kəlbənd
- Time zone: UTC+4 (AZT)
  - Summer (DST): UTC+5 (AZT)

Şükürçü (also, Shukyurchu and Shyukyurchi) is a village in the Ismailli Rayon of Azerbaijan. The village forms part of the municipality of Kəlbənd.
