= A.C. Kirk =

A.C. Kirk may refer to:

- Alexander Carnegie Kirk (1830–1892), Scottish engineer
- Alexander Comstock Kirk (1888–1979), US diplomat

== See also ==
- Alexander Kirk (disambiguation)
