= Paul Kirk =

Paul Kirk may refer to:

- Paul G. Kirk (born 1938), former United States Senator from Massachusetts and former chairman of the Democratic National Committee
- Paul G. Kirk Sr. (1904–1981), associate justice of the Massachusetts Supreme Judicial Court.
- Paul Hayden Kirk (1914–1995), American architect
- Paul L. Kirk (1902–1970), American chemist, forensic scientist, and Manhattan Project participant
- Manhunter (comics)#Paul Kirk, a DC Comics comic book character
- Paul Kirk (footballer) (born 1953), retired Irish league footballer and manager
- Paul Thomsen Kirk, electronic musician
