= David Kirk (disambiguation) =

David Kirk (born 1961) is a New Zealand rugby union footballer.

David Kirk may also refer to:

- David Kirk (author) (born 1955), children's book author
- David Kirk (activist) (1935–2007), civil rights activist and Eastern Orthodox cleric
- David Kirk (scientist) (born 1960), Chief Scientist of NVIDIA Corporation
- David Kirk (sociologist), American sociologist

== See also ==
- David Kirke (c. 1597–1654), adventurer and colonizer
