= Kəlbənd =

- Municipality
- Location within Azerbaijan
- Coordinates: 40°39′58″N 48°07′47″E
- Country: Azerbaijan
- Rayon: Ismailli

Population
  - Total: 812
- Time zone: UTC+4 (AZT)
  - Summer (DST): UTC+5 (AZT)

Kəlbənd (also, Kel’bend, Kel’vend, and Kyal’byand”) is a village and municipality in the Ismailli Rayon of Azerbaijan. It has a population of 812. The municipality consists of the villages of Kəlbənd, Qırmızı Oktyabr, Şükürçü, and Kirk.
