= The Adventures of Brer Rabbit =

- DVD cover
- Directed by: Byron Vaughns
- Screenplay by: John Loy
- Produced by: George Paige; Tad Stones
- Starring: Wayne Brady; Rhyon Nicole Brown; Nick Cannon; Danny Glover; D. L. Hughley; Phil LaMarr; Wanda Sykes; Gary Anthony Williams; Debra Wilson
- Edited by: Kirk Demorest
- Music by: Stephen James Taylor
- Production company: Universal Cartoon Studios
- Distributed by: Universal Studios Home Entertainment
- Release date: March 21, 2006
- Running time: 71 minutes
- Language: English

The Adventures of Brer Rabbit is a 2006 American direct-to-video animated comedy film loosely inspired by the African American Brer Rabbit stories popularized by Joel Chandler Harris. The film notably features an all-black cast, including Nick Cannon as the titular character. It was described by The Washington Post as having hip-hop influences.

== Plot ==
=== How Janey Met Brer Rabbit ===
A girl named Janey is constantly pushed around by her two siblings, Lester and Julie. She goes for a walk in the woods, only to happen upon an anthropomorphic rabbit named Brer Rabbit being chased by a fox named Brer Fox. Brer Rabbit soon tricks Brer Fox into getting trapped down a well before scurrying off. Janey is soon approached by Brer Turtle, who begins to tell her some of Brer Rabbit's exploits. The movie then becomes a series of vignettes starring Brer Rabbit.

=== How the Animals Came to Earth ===
Brer Turtle explains that the animals once lived as constellations in outer space, watched over by Sister Moon. When Sister Moon catches a cold, she tasks Brer Rabbit to send a message to a human on Earth named Mr. Man that she will be going away for a while to recuperate through a series of metaphors. While Brer Rabbit manages to get the message across, he was confused and didn't tell Mr. Man exactly how she said it, prompting Sister Moon to get upset and they have a spat that culminates in Brer Rabbit making holes in her. Because of this, Brer Rabbit decides to move to Earth and when he tells the other animals how good it is, they decide to move with him.

=== How Brer Rabbit Tricks Brer Fox Again and what came next ===
Brer Rabbit spends his days trying to avoid getting eaten by the predator animals (most notably Brer Fox and Brer Wolf) and constantly outwits them through a series of comical hijinks.

=== Brer Rabbit Tricks Brer Bear ===
When Brer Rabbit tries to pick some peanuts in Brer Fox's property, he is promptly caught in a trap and hung from a tree. He notices Brer Bear coming along and dupes him into taking his place by saying that he is "earning a dollar an hour" by guarding the peanut bushes and they manage to switch before Brer Fox comes.

=== Sister Moon in the Pond ===
The animals have an annual fishing trip at night. Brer Rabbit is having no such luck, so he and Brer Turtle work together to distract the others by making them think Sister Moon is in the pond and scaring away the fishes so that they can steal their fish for themselves.

=== How Brer Rabbit Breaks up the Party ===
Brer Turtle tells Janey that Brer Rabbit's antics eventually caused the other animals to snub him from a party at Brer Fox's house. Brer Rabbit soon gets an idea to retaliate by covering himself in mud, leaves and sticks and pretends to be a monster to scare away the animals, putting an abrupt end to the party. Satisfied with his payback at first, Brer Rabbit then sadly walks away to sulk in loneliness.

=== Brer Rabbit to the Rescue ===
Feeling sorry for Brer Rabbit, Brer Turtle attempts to get Brer Wolf to befriend him, but Brer Wolf rebuffs him and soon tries to eat him before Brer Rabbit saves him. After which, Brer Rabbit then begins to perform selfless acts for the other animals, causing him to be in their good graces, with the exception of Brer Fox.

=== How Brer Rabbit and Brer Bear Trick Brer Fox ===
When Brer Rabbit learns from Brer Fox that he is after some "big game" food to feed his relatives, he soon finds out that he is trying to capture Brer Bear. The two of them manage to trick Brer Fox into catching the ferocious Brer Lion and Brer Fox is promptly beaten to a pulp. Later that night, however, Brer Fox breaks down Brer Rabbit's front door and captures him.

=== Brer Rabbit's Laughing Place ===
Tied up to a pole to be roasted by Brer Fox, Brer Rabbit manages to convince him that creatures who eat "sad rabbits" don't fare very well and tells Brer Fox that he can be happy if he goes to his "laughing place". Brer Rabbit leads Brer Fox way across the forest to an old tree where he tricks Brer Fox into causing a bee-hive to fall on his head, prompting the Fox to run away, leaving Brer Rabbit tied up on the pole.

=== Brer Wolf Gets in Trouble ===
Brer Wolf finds Brer Rabbit tied to the pole but before he eats him, Brer Rabbit fools Brer Wolf into going into a log by saying that there's buried treasure within it. Brer Rabbit pushes the log off a cliff it was hanging over and into a pond where he meets Brer Fox and they soon find out that Brer Rabbit tricked them both again.

=== Brer Rabbit and the Briar Patch ===
Brer Fox and Brer Wolf resolve to get revenge on the rabbit by making a baby out of tar. When Brer Rabbit happens upon it he gets trapped in it, and Brer Fox and Brer Wolf appear to ponder on how to get rid of Brer Rabbit. The rabbit sees a briar patch and gets an idea to use reverse psychology to make them throw him in there. They do so, and Brer Rabbit gets free and tricks them into jumping into the patch themselves.

Back in the present, Brer Fox happens upon Brer Turtle and Janey and asks where Brer Rabbit went. Brer Turtle points him in the wrong direction. After Brer Fox leaves, Brer Rabbit arrives and Janey asks how he is able to trick the other animals, to which Brer Rabbit responds "just give them what they think they want". Janey's mother then calls her for dinner and she says goodbye to the animals.

=== How Janey Tricked Lester ===
In the final vignette, Janey takes what Brer Rabbit said to heart and dupes Lester into wanting their mom's dinner, which is tuna casserole, much to his dismay. Brer Rabbit and Turtle see this and are impressed before they have a race to go back to the woods. Brer Rabbit is then caught in another trap.

The film ends by showing Sister Moon in outer space watching over the rabbit with a smile before winking at the audience.

== Voice cast ==
- Nick Cannon as Brer Rabbit
- Rhyon Nicole Brown as Janey
- D. L. Hughley as Brer Fox
- Danny Glover as Brer Turtle
- Gary Anthony Williams as Brer Bear
- Wayne Brady as Brer Wolf
- Wanda Sykes as Sister Moon
- Debra Wilson as Sister Buzzard
- Phil LaMarr as Brer Gator
- Monica Allison as Julie
- Dorian Harewood as Mr. Man
- Dawnn Lewis as Mom/Sister Mink (Uncredited)
- Quinton Madin as Lester
- Daniel Christopher Paige as Brer Crow/Brer Skunk (Uncredited)
- Deborah Speck as Momma Mouse
- Michael Ferdie as Ninja #1
- Jeff Kushner as Ninja #2

== Accolades ==
The Adventures of Brer Rabbit was nominated for the Best Home Entertainment Production Award at the 34th Annie Awards.
