= Robert Kirk =

Robert Kirk may refer to:

- Robert Kirk (philosopher) (born 1933), professor emeritus at the University of Nottingham
- Robert Kirk (folklorist) (1644–1692), minister, Gaelic scholar and folklorist
- Robert C. Kirk (1821–1898), American politician, Lieutenant Governor of Ohio, 1860–1862
- Bobby Kirk (ice hockey) (1909–1970), Irish ice hockey player
- Bobby Kirk (footballer) (1927–2010), Scottish footballer
- Bob Kirk (1845–1886), Scottish professional golfer
- Robert Kirk (pathologist) (1905–1962), Scottish parasitologist and professor of pathology
