= Aberarder =

Hamlet in Scotland

Coordinates: 57.308056°N 4.262778°W

Aberarder: Scottish Gaelic: Obar Àrdair
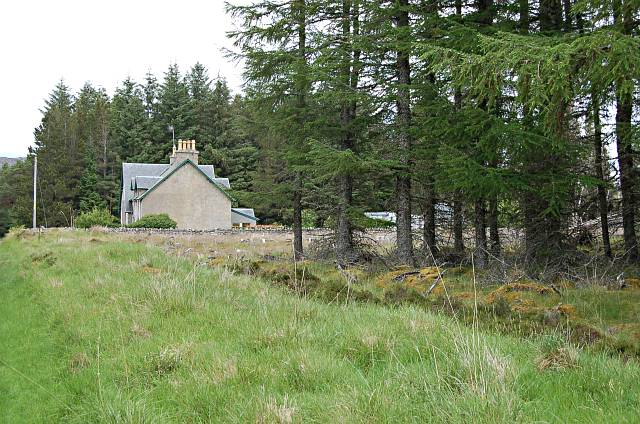

- Location within the Inverness area
- OS grid reference: NN486871
- Council area: Highland
- Country: Scotland
- Sovereign state: United Kingdom
- Postcode district: PH20 1
- Police: Scotland
- Fire: Scottish
- Ambulance: Scottish
- UK Parliament: Inverness, Skye and West Ross-shire
- Scottish Parliament: Skye, Lochaber and Badenoch

Aberarder (Scottish Gaelic: Obar Àrdair) is a hamlet to the south of Loch Ruthven, Scottish Highlands and is in the Scottish council area of Highland. It lies on the B851 road, to the east of Loch Ness. After the Rising of 1745, Aberarder was owned by the Farquharsons of Invercauld.
