= John Kirk (footballer, born 1922) =

English footballer

Personal information
- Full name: John Francis Kirk
- Date of birth: 7 February 1922
- Place of birth: Leicester, England
- Date of death: 20 October 2006 (aged 84)
- Place of death: Leicester, England
- Position: Winger

Senior career*
Years	Team	Apps	(Gls)
19??–1951	Nottingham Forest	0	(0)
1951–1952	Darlington	31	(4)
–	Kidderminster Harriers		
- * Club domestic league appearances and goals

John Francis Kirk (7 February 1922 – 20 October 2006) was an English footballer who made 31 appearances in the Football League playing on the wing for Darlington in the 1950s. He was on the books of Nottingham Forest, but never represented them in the League, and went on to play non-league football for Kidderminster Harriers.
