= James Kirk (disambiguation) =

James T. Kirk is the fictional protagonist of the original Star Trek television series.

James Kirk may also refer to:

== Military ==
- James T. Kirk (Union officer) (1826–1886), colonel in the American Civil War
- James Kirk (VC) (1897–1918), recipient of the Victoria Cross
- James A. Kirk, rear admiral in the United States Navy, former commanding officer of USS Zumwalt

== Others ==
- James Kirk: Scottish post-punk musician, original member of Orange Juice
- James R. Kirk, singer/songwriter/creative director for CorporateMagic, Inc.
- James Kirk diploma mills, operator of several fraudulent higher education organizations (diploma mills)
- Jimmy Kirk (1925–2020), Scottish footballer
- Jimmy Kirk (footballer, born 1913) (1913–1963), Scottish footballer
- J. Ralph Kirk (1895–1963), Liberal Party member of the Canadian House of Commons
- James Kirk (Michigan politician) (1879–1957), member of the Michigan House of Representatives

== See also ==
- James Allenby-Kirk (born 1988), Scottish actor
