= Kirk Dawes =

British constable

Kirk Dawes QPM
- Born: c. 1957; Wolverhampton, England
- Education: Willenhall Comprehensive School
- Known for: Founder of The Centre For Conflict Transformation (TCFCT), anti-gang and gun violence mediation
- Police career
- Department: West Midlands Police
- Service years: 1976–2004
- Rank: Detective Constable
- Awards: Queen's Police Medal (2004)
- Other work: Mediation, basketball coach, Board Member of Birmingham Royal Ballet

Kirk Dawes QPM (born c. 1957) is a former Detective Constable with West Midlands Police who formerly ran The Centre For Conflict Transformation (TCFCT) formerly West Midlands Mediation and Transformation Services, a company involved in trying to reduce gun and gang violence in the United Kingdom.

== Early life and police career ==
Born in Wolverhampton, one of six surviving children of Caribbean immigrants. An early memory is of moving to a new house in a council estate in Bilston where most residents had signed a petition against black families moving in. Educated at Willenhall Comprehensive School he then joined West Midlands Police in 1976. After three years as an ordinary constable in Willenhall and Walsall, he moved into specialist units, initially the robbery squad from 1979 until 1981, then the special patrol group, then from 1985 the drugs squad, before joining Sutton Coldfield and Castle Vale CID in 1989 as a Detective Constable. After the publication of the Macpherson report in 1995 he moved into training other CID officers in racial diversity issues. In 1998 he became the regional chairman of the Black and Asian Police Association. A lung condition curtailed his police career in 2004, and on 12 June 2004 he was awarded the Queen's Police Medal (QPM) in the Queen's Birthday Honours.

== Mediation ==
After leaving the police he set up his company which mediates between principally Birmingham's gangs and others across the UK, and also tries to disengage youths from gang culture. His lung complaint also reduced his involvement in basketball, he played for the British police team and coached national league sides, and still uses basketball in his mediation work. He is also on the board of Birmingham Royal Ballet.

The work of Dawes and the WMMTS is regularly reported in the British media; he was a "witness" interviewed by the "Street Weapons Commission" organised by Channel 4 and chaired by Cherie Booth which in 2008 investigated youth violence in the United Kingdom; he has also appeared as a witness before the House of Commons Home Affairs Select Committee; and he is a regular conference speaker.
