= Kristi Kirk =

American academic administrator

10th president of Concordia University Texas
- Incumbent
- Assumed office November 1, 2024
- Preceded by: Donald Christian

Personal details
- Children: 6
- Education: Concordia University Texas; University of Texas at Austin; Capella University

Kristi K. Kirk is an American academic administrator who will become the tenth president and chief executive officer of Concordia University Texas on November 1, 2024.

== Education ==
Kirk earned an undergraduate degree in history from Concordia University Texas. She completed a master's degree in American civilization from University of Texas at Austin and a Ph.D. in leadership in higher education from Capella University. Her 2013 dissertation was titled, The Changing Nature Of Church College Relations: A History And Case Study Of Concordia University Texas. Thomas Bourque was her doctoral advisor.

== Career ==
Kirk began her career at Concordia University Texas in 1993 as the admissions office manager while completing her studies. Over the following years, she held various administrative roles, including assistant director of admissions and vice president of student and enrollment services. In July 2015, she was appointed provost and executive vice president of the university. During her tenure as provost, Kirk oversaw several initiatives, including the Right Call Initiative, which reduced undergraduate tuition by nearly 40% for the 2024–2025 academic year. In May 2023, she also helped secure a $2.71 million Title V grant for the Concordia Con Corazón project, designed to support Hispanic and low-income students.

Kirk is the incoming tenth president and chief executive officer of Concordia University Texas, set to take office on November 1, 2024. She will be the first woman to hold the position in the university's history, succeeding Donald Christian, who will retire after nearly 20 years of service.

== Personal life ==
Kirk is married to Daniel Kirk, and they have six children. The couple is also licensed foster parents. Kirk serves on the board of directors for Concordia Lutheran High School and the nonprofit organization Acts of Love.
