= Kirkhill =

Kirkhill or Kirkhills may refer to a number of places.

In Canada:

- Kirkhill, Nova Scotia
- Kirkhill, Ontario, an area of North Glengarry

In Northern Ireland:

- Kirkhills, a townland in County Antrim

In Scotland:

- Kirkhill industrial estate, near Dyce and Aberdeen Airport
- Kirkhill, Angus, a location
- Kirkhill, East Renfrewshire, a district of the town of Newton Mearns
- Kirkhill, Highland, a village near Beauly in Inverness-shire
- Kirkhill, West Lothian, an area of the town of Broxburn
- Kirkhill, Midlothian, an area of the town of Penicuik
- Kirkhill Pendicle, a hamlet near Maud, Aberdeenshire, with a weather station appearing on Met Office maps
- Kirkhill, South Lanarkshire, an area of the town of Cambuslang
  - Kirkhill railway station
