= Paul Thomsen Kirk =

- Also known as: Akatombo
- Origin: Scotland
- Occupation: Musician
- Instrument(s): Bass guitar, vocals, guitar, keyboards

Paul Thomsen Kirk, also known as Akatombo, is a Scottish-born Hiroshima-based electronic musician. Kirk has worked with Graham Lewis of the band Wire.

Kirk has made short films to try and capture a visual representation of what "Akatombo" is. One of such film, is Unconfirmed Reports, which made it to the 2007 Wisconsin Film Festival.

== Discography ==
Solo

- Trace Elements (Spigel's Swim, 2003)
- False Positives
- Sometime, Never (Hand-Held Recordings, 2015)
- Short Fuse (Hand-Held Recordings, 2017)

With Graham Lewis

- All Over (2014)
