= John Kirk (footballer, born 1930) =

Canadian soccer player

John McCrae Kirk (13 March 1930 – 21 May 2003) was a soccer player.

Kirk, was born in Canada, and moved to Scotland as a boy. He first played for Montrose, before joining Portsmouth as an amateur. However, his time at Portsmouth was interrupted while he spent two years in the military. He never played a game for Portsmouth, so he went to Accrington Stanley, where he played two seasons and scored one goal in 14 games.
