= Inveraldie =

Coordinates: 56.521419°N 2.947542°W

- Location within Angus
- OS grid reference: NO418370
- Council area: Angus
- Lieutenancy area: Angus
- Country: Scotland
- Sovereign state: United Kingdom
- Post town: DUNDEE
- Postcode district: DD4
- Dialling code: 01382
- Police: Scotland
- Fire: Scottish
- Ambulance: Scottish
- UK Parliament: Dundee East
- Scottish Parliament: Angus North East Scotland

Inveraldie is a village in Angus, Scotland. It lies on the north-bound side of the A90 road, two miles north of Dundee.

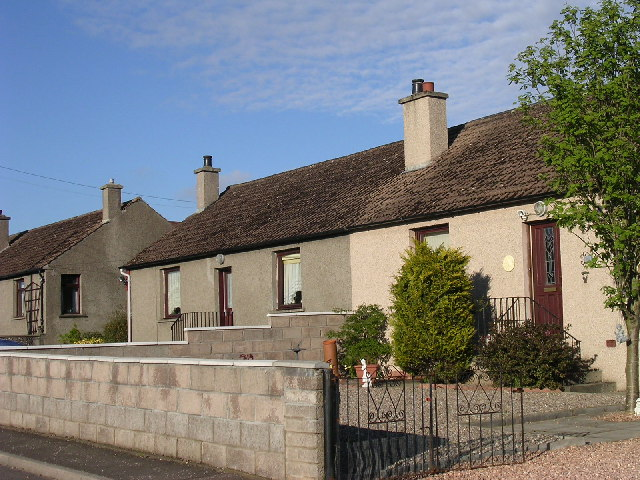
Cottages at Inveraldie
