= Abergairn Castle =

Coordinates: 57.0631°N 3.0602°W

- Near Ballater in Scotland

Site information
- Owner: Farquharsons
- Condition: Ruined

Location
- Height: 3 or 4 storeys

Site history
- Built: 1614
- In use: 17th Century

Abergairn Castle is a ruined castle, dating from the 17th century, about one mile north of Ballater, Aberdeenshire, Scotland. It is built on the top of an isolated kame, at the north-east of the entrance to Glen Gairn.

== History ==
The castle was the property of the Farquharsons. It was built in 1614, possibly as a hunting lodge. The name is of Gaelic derivation, meaning "the confluence of the Gairn", indicating its location near the confluence of River Gairn and River Dee.

== Structure ==
Abergairn castle was a tower house of which little other than the basement remains. It was small, probably having three or four storeys with a garret.

The main tower survives only to a maximum height of 4 feet; a round tower to the north-west reaches to 10 feet.
