= Kirkin' o' the Tartan =

Scottish-American cultural and religious ceremony

The Kirkin' o' the Tartan is an American tradition among Scottish descendants. It is a religious ceremony which includes a blessing of the family tartans of those present for the occasion.

== Background ==
The Kirkin' o' the Tartan is a tradition which originated as a fundraiser for British war relief in 1941. Reverend Peter Marshall is often credited with organizing and popularizing the event during his time as the pastor of the New York Avenue Presbyterian Church in Washington, D.C. The service includes a blessing of family tartans, which are often carried in by a family representative.

The term kirk is the Scots word for 'church', and in this case refers to the blessing ("churching") of the tartans.

Today the Kirkin' o' the Tartan is celebrated throughout the United States and Canada by those of Scottish descent. Originally conceived as a Presbyterian ceremony, today it is observed by a variety of Christian denominations, including Episcopalian, Methodist, Catholic, and Orthodox.

While it may be celebrated at different times of the year, popular dates include the Feast of St. Andrew (Andermas) on November 30, and Tartan Day on April 6. In New York City, the service is organized by St Andrew's Society of the State of New York and plays a predominate role in the city's Tartan Week festival held annually in April.

== Legend ==
According to the tradition, the Kirkin' o' the Tartan originated in Scotland. After defeating Jacobite forces in 1746 at the Battle of Culloden, the British government outlawed Highland dress. Legend has it that during this period, Scots would hide small pieces of tartan fabric on their person while attending church services. When it came time for the blessing, they would touch the bit of cloth. However, there is no credible source for this tale.
