= Kirk Demorest =

American filmmaker

- Education: University of California, Santa Barbara; ArtCenter College of Design
- Occupations: Filmmaker; writer; entrepreneur; editor; post-production consultant

Kirk Demorest is an American filmmaker, writer, entrepreneur, editor and post-production consultant. He is the co-founder of Arthouse Films, Los Angeles, now known as the Arthouse Company, LLC. His film and editing work has been widely distributed internationally on television and DVD.

== Early life and education ==
After studying cinema at University of California, Santa Barbara, he transferred to ArtCenter College of Design in Pasadena where he studied film alongside the likes of Tarsem Singh, Michael Bay, and Roger Avary. Since college, he has been involved with film and TV production and post production including directing a television spot for Gig Magazine (that aired on MTV) and editing a series for Home & Garden Television.

== Career ==
=== Editing ===
Demorest was the editor for Walt Disney Television Animation's “Mickey's Twice Upon a Christmas” where he worked for months alongside world-renowned animator Andreas Deja in crafting the first Computer-generated imagery animation versions of Disney characters: Mickey Mouse, Minnie Mouse, Donald Duck, and Goofy. Demorest was a contributing editor for the animated film “Brother Bear 2” starring Mandy Moore and Patrick Dempsey.

Demorest edited the Universal Animation Studios' Emmy Award-nominated children's series for PBS “Curious George (TV series)” starring William H. Macy. He also was the editor for the DVD release of “The Adventures of Brer Rabbit”.

=== Short films ===
Demorest won a tie award for his short film, Since My Last Dance, in 2003 with legendary director John Woo for "Best Internet Video Premiere", beating out director Tony Scott.

Demorest wrote and directed this film which was an official selection in actor Kevin Spacey's Trigger Street Film Festival, and is included on the DVD release for the feature film "Kwik Stop". The film has been seen by tens of thousands of viewers.

Demorest directed radio talk jock Heidi Hamilton (the radio show Frosty, Heidi, & Frank) in this ultra short film about racism, which is now in distribution via cell phone. This film has also been seen by tens of thousands of viewers.

This was Demorest's first foray into the black comedy genre. He acquired rights to the song "Happy Go Lucky Me" by Paul Evans.

=== Post production ===
Demorest was the co-founder of HD DECK RENTALS. COM, a leading searchable database of standard definition and high definition professional video equipment rentals (including HDCAM, DVCPRO HD, XDCAM HD, AND D5) whereby equipment can be located according to zip code. At the launch of HDDeckRentals.com, Demorest was featured in the acclaimed post-production magazine Studio Monthly. Demorest supervised the transfers of jobs for such notable celebrities as Will Smith and Mic Fleetwood, as well as the primary footage for the Slamdance Award-winning documentary "Abel Raises Cain."
