= Roger Kirkby =

Roger Kirkby may refer to:

- Roger Kirkby (died 1709) (c. 1649–1709), English soldier and politician
- Roger Kirkby (Royalist) (died 1643), English politician who sat in the House of Commons from 1640 to 1642
