= Peter Kirk =

Peter Kirk may refer to:

- Peter Kirk (businessman) (1860–1916), British-born American mill-owner, founder of the City of Kirkland, Washington, USA
- Sir Peter Kirk (English politician) (1928–1977), British Conservative MP and government minister
- Peter Kirk (MP for Carrickfergus) (1800–1856), UK MP from the Irish constituency of Carrickfergus 1835–1847
- Peter Kirk (director) (born 1969), Australian film director

== Characters ==
- Peter Kirk, a character in The Grudge
- Peter Kirk, nephew of James T. Kirk in the fictional Star Trek universe
