= David Kirk (sociologist) =

American sociologist

- Education: Vanderbilt University; University of Chicago
- Awards: 2010 James F. Short Jr. Distinguished Article Award from the Crime, Law, and Deviance Section of the American Sociological Association
- Scientific career
- Fields: Sociology
- Institutions: University of Oxford's Nuffield College; University of Texas at Austin
- Thesis: Unraveling the neighborhood and school effects on youth behavior (2006)
- Academic advisors: Robert J. Sampson

David S. Kirk is an American sociologist and professor of sociology in the Department of Sociology and Nuffield College, Oxford. Before joining the Oxford faculty in 2015, he was an associate professor in the department of sociology at the University of Texas at Austin. His research interests have included the effects of high concentrations of former prisoners in a neighborhood on their probability of reoffending, and the effects of Uber on rates of drunk driving in the United States.
