= Edward Kirk =

Edward Kirk may refer to:

- Edward N. Kirk (1828–1863), Civil War Union general
- Edward Norris Kirk (1802–1874), Presbyterian pastor
