= William Kirk =

William Kirk may refer to:

- William Arthur Kirk, American mathematician
- William Astor Kirk, (1922–2011), American civil rights activist and author
- William F. Kirk, (1877–1927), American baseball writer and poet
- Billy Kirk, rugby league footballer of the 1930s for England, and Warrington
- William Kirk (cricketer), (1866–1904), English cricketer
- William L. Kirk, (1932–2017), American air force officer
- William Umpleby Kirk, (1843–1928), photographer
- Bill Kirk (1934–2009), American baseball player
- William Kirk (MP), (1795–1870), Member of the UK Parliament for Newry
- William Kirke, MP for Clitheroe
- Will Kirk, Furniture restorer The Repair Shop
