= Kirk, Azerbaijan =

Village in Azerbaijan

Kirk Գիրք • Girk
- Location within Azerbaijan
- Coordinates: 40°40′57″N 48°06′29″E
- Country: Azerbaijan
- District: Ismayilli
- Municipality: Kəlbənd
- Time zone: UTC+4 (AZT)

Kirk (Armenian: Գիրք, romanized: Girk) is a village in the Ismayilli District of Azerbaijan. The village forms part of the municipality of Kəlbənd. The village had an Armenian population before the exodus of Armenians from Azerbaijan after the outbreak of the Nagorno-Karabakh conflict.
