= Kirk, Colorado =

Unincorporated community in Yuma County, CO, USA

- Census-designated place
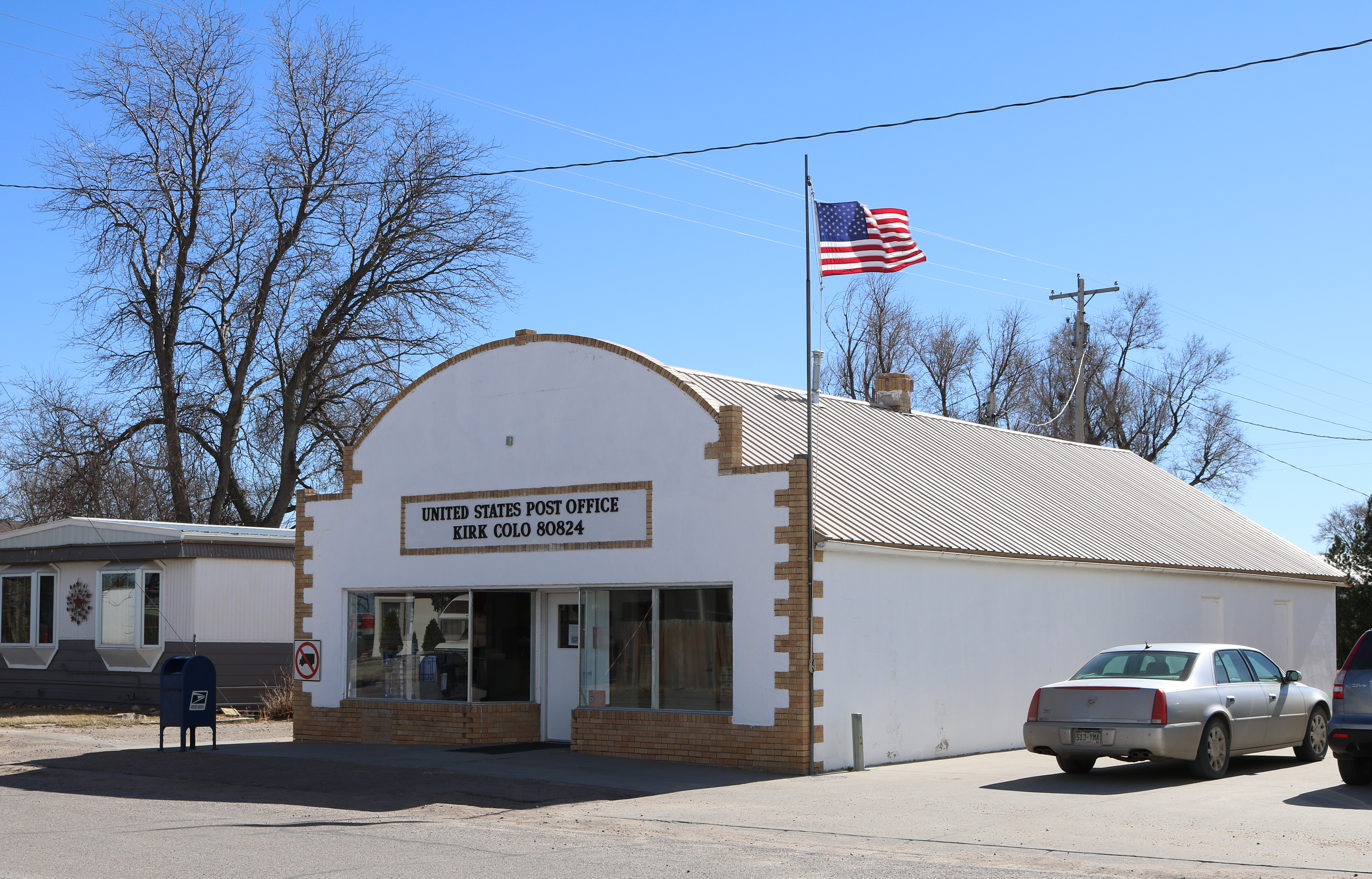
- Kirk post office (2017)

- Location within Yuma County and Colorado
- Coordinates: 39°37′15″N 102°35′31″W
- Country: United States
- State: Colorado
- County: Yuma

Area
  - Total: 4.101 sq mi (10.622 km^{2})
  - Land: 4.101 sq mi (10.622 km^{2})
  - Water: 0 sq mi (0.000 km^{2})
- Elevation: 4,203 ft (1,281 m)

Population (2020)
  - Total: 61
  - Density: 15/sq mi (5.7/km^{2})
- Time zone: UTC−7 (MST)
  - Summer (DST): UTC−6 (MDT)
- ZIP Code: 80824
- Area code: 970
- FIPS code: 08-40900
- GNIS ID: 2583255

Kirk is an unincorporated town and a census-designated place (CDP) in Yuma County, Colorado, United States. At the United States Census 2020, the population of the Kirk CDP was 61.

== History ==
The Kirk post office has been in operation since 1887, with an original name of Kim. The Kirk post office has the ZIP Code 80824.

The community was established by A. Newkirk, and named for him. "Kirk" is the Scots language word for "church".

Kirk is home to a grain elevator, meat processing plant, bank, grocery, feed and supply store and the post office.

== Geography ==
The Kirk CDP has an area of 2,625 acres (10.622 km^{2}), all land.

== Demographics ==
The United States Census Bureau initially defined the Kirk CDP for the United States Census 2010.

Historical population
Census	Pop.	Note	%±
2010	59		—
2020	61		3.4%
U.S. Decennial Census

== See also ==
- Colorado census designated places
