= John P. Kirk =

American politician

- Born: September 20, 1867; Ypsilanti, Michigan
- Died: August 22, 1952 (aged 84); Ypsilanti
- Citizenship: United States
- Education: University of Michigan
- Known for: Politician
- Political party: Democrat
- Children: Ruth M. Kirk, Bernard C. Kirk, Helen A. Kirk, Marian K. Kirk
- Parent(s): Bernard Kirk and Ann (Murphy) Kirk

John Patrick Kirk (September 20, 1867, Ypsilanti, Michigan – August 22, 1952, Ypsilanti) was a Michigan politician in the early 1900s.

He was born on September 20, 1867, the son of Bernard Kirk (d. 1899) and Ann (Murphy) Kirk, immigrants from Ireland. He married Mary Shaff on June 20, 1898. Kirk graduated from the University of Michigan Law School in 1888 and became a lawyer, was Washtenaw County prosecuting attorney from 1897 to 1900. He was commissioned as a major in the Army during the Spanish–American War; his name is inscribed on Ypsilanti's Spanish–American War Memorial, as the highest-ranking officer. Kirk subsequently became a general.

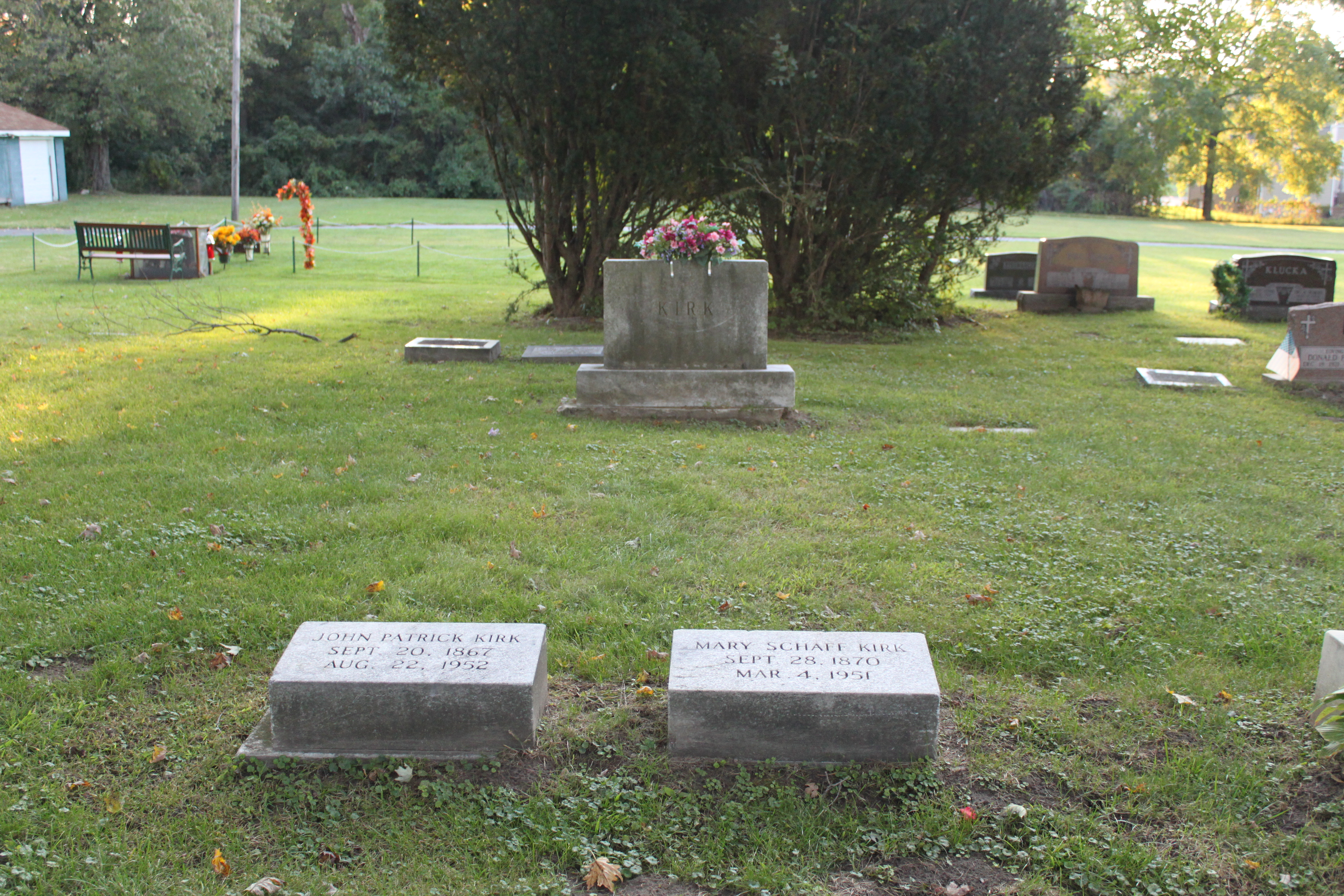
Kirk grave

He was a member of Michigan House of Representatives from Washtenaw County's 2nd district from 1903 to 1904, when he became an unsuccessful candidate for the United States House of Representatives for Michigan's 2nd congressional district in the 1904 general elections. He was elected mayor of Ypsilanti in 1908, defeating George D. Lockwood, and served from 1908 to 1910. He was nominated as the Democratic candidate for Lieutenant Governor of Michigan in 1916, but lost. He was an unsuccessful candidate for circuit judge in Michigan 22nd Circuit in 1917. He was a delegate from Michigan to the 1936 Democratic National Convention, at which Franklin Delano Roosevelt was renominated for president. In his later career, Kirk was a bank president in Ypsilanti, where he died in 1952. He is buried in St. John Cemetery in Ypsilanti.

John Kirk and his wife had 4 children. His eldest son, Bernard Kirk, was an All-American football player who played for both the University of Notre Dame and the University of Michigan.
