= Stoer (disambiguation) =

Stoer is a township in Scotland. Stoer may also refer to:

== People ==
- Josef Stoer (*1934), German mathematician, father of Mechthild
- Mechthild Stoer, German applied mathematician, daughter of Josef

== See also ==
- Old Man of Stoer
- Stoer Head
