= Clachtoll =

Coordinates: 58.18805°N 5.33739°W

Clachtoll: Scottish Gaelic: Clach Toll
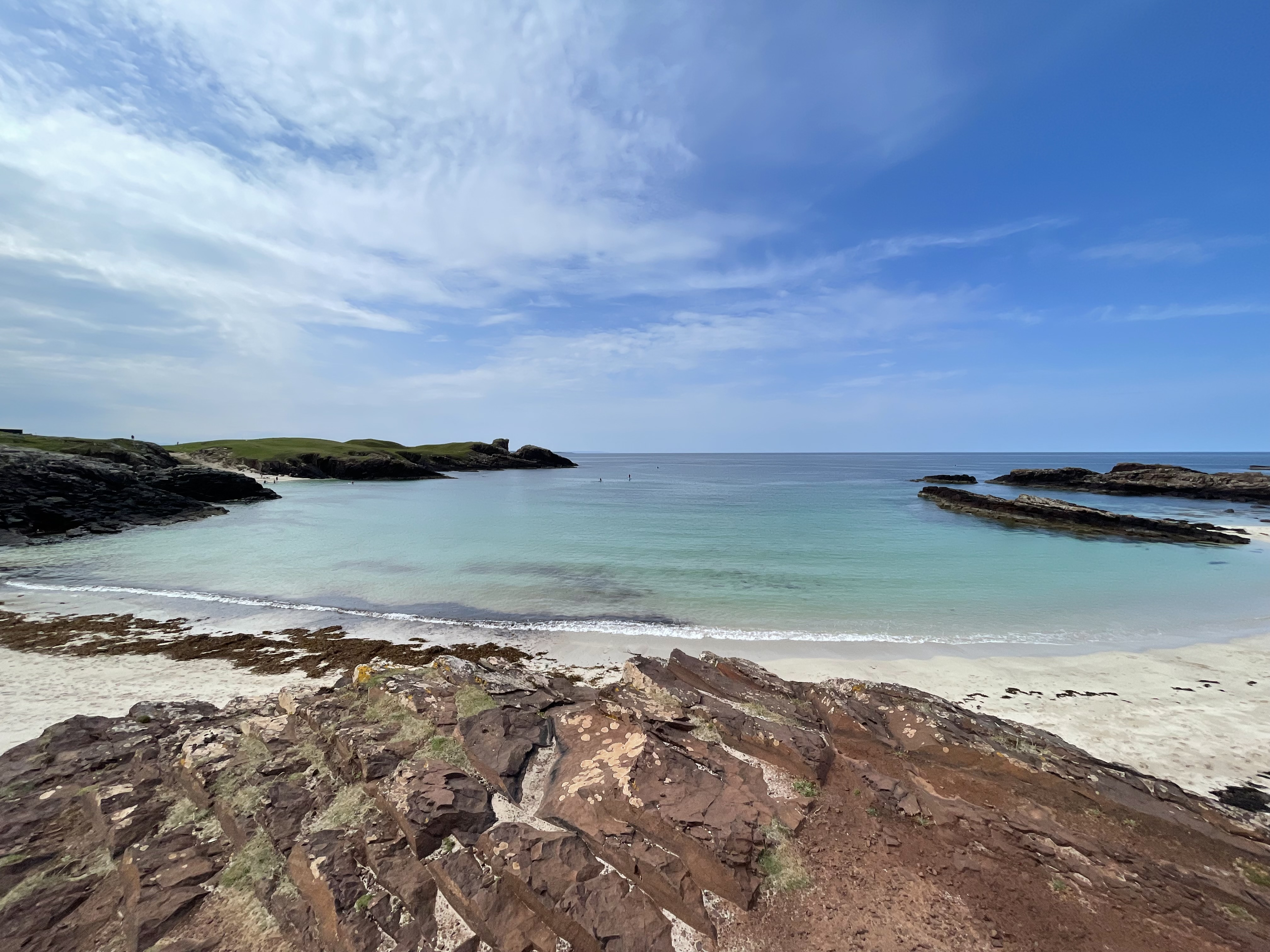
- Clachtoll Beach

- Location within the Sutherland area
- OS grid reference: NC039269
- Council area: Highland
- Lieutenancy area: Sutherland
- Country: Scotland
- Sovereign state: United Kingdom
- Post town: Lairg
- Postcode district: IV27 4
- Police: Scotland
- Fire: Scottish
- Ambulance: Scottish

Clachtoll (Scottish Gaelic: Clach Toll) is a coastal fishing and crofting village situated on the Bay of Clachtoll, in the ancient parish of Assynt, Sutherland county, in the Highland Council area on the north western edge of Scotland. It is in the postal district of Lairg, a larger village about fifty miles (80 km) inland. South of the village center is the start of the Clachtoll Peat Road––a hiking trail that extends into the Scottish Highlands with views of Suilven and other mountains in the distance.

The name Clachtoll derives from Gaelic, and refers to the very large broken rock, the remains of a natural arch (Gaelic: clach is "stone" or "rock" and toll means "hole", "cavity", etc.) on the headland near Clacktoll beach. Adjacent to the beach is a memorial to the Reverend Norman Macleod, a charismatic evangelical Protestant minister who was born in the area and eventually settled in Waipu, New Zealand.

North of Clachtoll and adjacent to Stoer beach sits an Iron Age broch, a double walled tower standing by the sea shore with walls still standing up to 3 metres (10 feet) high, although believed to have been originally much taller. The broch features an impressive blue-green soapstone grinding stone. Archaeological excavation between 2017 and 2020 revealed that broch was probably built between 400 and 250 BC, and was burnt down between 50 BC and 25 AD.
