= Unscripted television =

Unscripted television may refer to:

- Improvised situation comedy
- Reality television
- Documentary television
