= Alexander Schulz =

German tightrope walker

Alexander Helmut Schulz (born 1991) is a German professional tightrope walker, multiple highline world record holder, and keynote speaker. Schulz is internationally known for pioneering the first walks of several slacklines and world records at extraordinary locations. In his most dangerous project to date, "LavaLine", he crossed the active volcano Mount Yasur on a highline in April 2020 on the South Sea island of Tanna, Vanuatu.

== Life ==
Alexander Schulz grew up in Rosenheim as part of a family that valued outdoor and sporting activities. During his early childhood he joined his father, Raimon Schulz, on numerous adventures and expeditions. His hobbies included sports such as hiking, gymnastics and ice hockey as well as white-water kayaking, climbing, skiing, caving and canyoning. Before slacklining became a trend sport in the early 2010s, Schulz had put up his first slacklines. In June 2011 he walked his first highline and found entry to the slackline community. During this time, he met many well-known people of the slackline scene, including future teammate and business partner Johannes Olszewski.

Since graduating high school in 2011, Alexander Schulz has devoted himself to slacklining full-time. Together with Olszewski and three other friends he founded the collective "One Inch Dreams" in early 2012. One Inch Dreams started as a slackline portal, and over the course of many successful projects and world records the company developed into a creative agency and film producer.

Schulz also gives lectures on the topics of risk management and coping strategies, as well as the conscious handling of fear. In addition to his daily training, regular yoga practice, mental training and breathing exercises help him to carry out his projects in terms of overcoming fear and stress. He is a regular guest in film and television, reporting about his expeditions and projects in Galileo (Fernsehsendung)|Galileo, Bayerischen Rundfunk, Deutsche Welle, SAT1, WDR, ZDF, RTL, MDR, SWR and France 3. Schulz shares his expertise with highline beginners in workshops in Rosenheim as well as in his chosen home of Innsbruck.

== Career ==
Schulz began his career as a professional athlete in 2011 when he signed his first sponsorship contract and set his first records. On June 4, 2011, he broke the then world record with a 140-meter-long waterline in the Salzburg Land. At the Natural Games in Millau, France in mid-June, 2011, he crossed the longest highland in the world at the time with 115 meters in both directions (onsight fullman).

At the end of 2011, Schulz constructed the first so-called "Space-Highline" (also known as Space-Line) during a two-month highline trip in the western United States, the forerunner of the Spacenet slackline structures that are occasionally found today (as of 2020). On the same trip, Schulz beat his record by four meters when he climbed the 119 meter long highline over the Consumnes River Gorge (California). In the following years, various world records and special projects followed.

Together with his teammate Niklas Winter, he gained a lot of media attention in the German-speaking world with a highline stunt at Zugspitze Glacier Cable Car in July 2014.

With the crossing of the 375m long highline The Ghost Inside in Yangshuo, China, he doubled the length of his old world record.

On the occasion of his world record in China, Schulz was invited as a distinguished guest to the Opening Day of the German Embassy in Beijing. With a slackline show, he symbolically connected the capital of China with the Federal Republic of Germany. A few days later, with the help of his team, Schulz managed to walk a 610-meter-long slackline in the Gobi Desert, breaking the world record for the longest slackline over ground (longline).

In 2016, Schulz failed in his attempt to walk over a 650-meter-long polyamide highline over the volcano Roches Tuilieres et Sanadoire in the French Auvergne. The attempt had to be interrupted because gusts of wind with wind peaks of over 120 km/h caused amplitudes of up to 100 meters in the highline, making the crossing impossible. The project was successful one month later and Schulz broke the world record for the longest polyamide highline.

In December 2016, Schulz crossed the world's longest and highest highline in urban surroundings in Mexico City. The slackline was installed between the city's highest buildings (Torre Reforma and Torre BBVA Bancomer) over the Paseo de la Reforma as part of a film production.

In October 2018, Schulz and Olszewski produced the key visual for the Deutschlandjahr 2018/19 in the USA together with One Inch Dreams. The symbolic image was created as part of the film production BuildingBridges, which was commissioned by the German Foreign Office, the Goethe Institute and the Federation of German Industries as part of the initiative WunderbarTogether .

On April 15, 2020, Alexander Schulz and his Brazilian colleague Rafael Bridi succeeded in crossing the first highline over an active volcano, Mount Yasur on the island of Tanna (Vanuatu). The athletes wore gas masks to protect themselves from the toxic sulfur vapors at the crater. According to Schulz, the biggest challenge were the shockwaves caused by the lava eruptions, which disturbed the athletes' sense of balance. The expedition lasted almost two months because the outbreak of the worldwide COVID-19 pandemic and the following local lockdown of Vanuatu significantly impacted the undertaking.

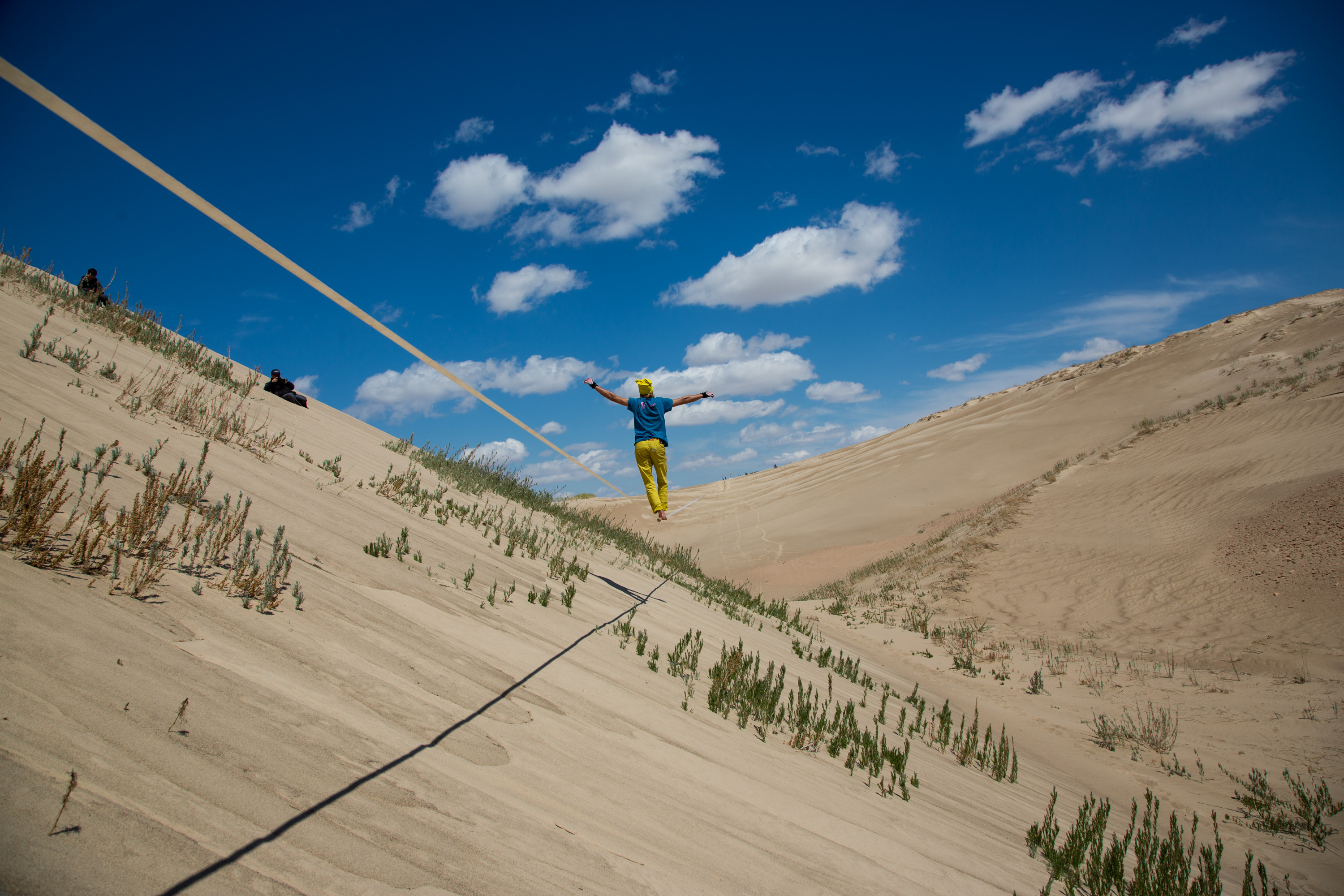
610m in Chinese desert

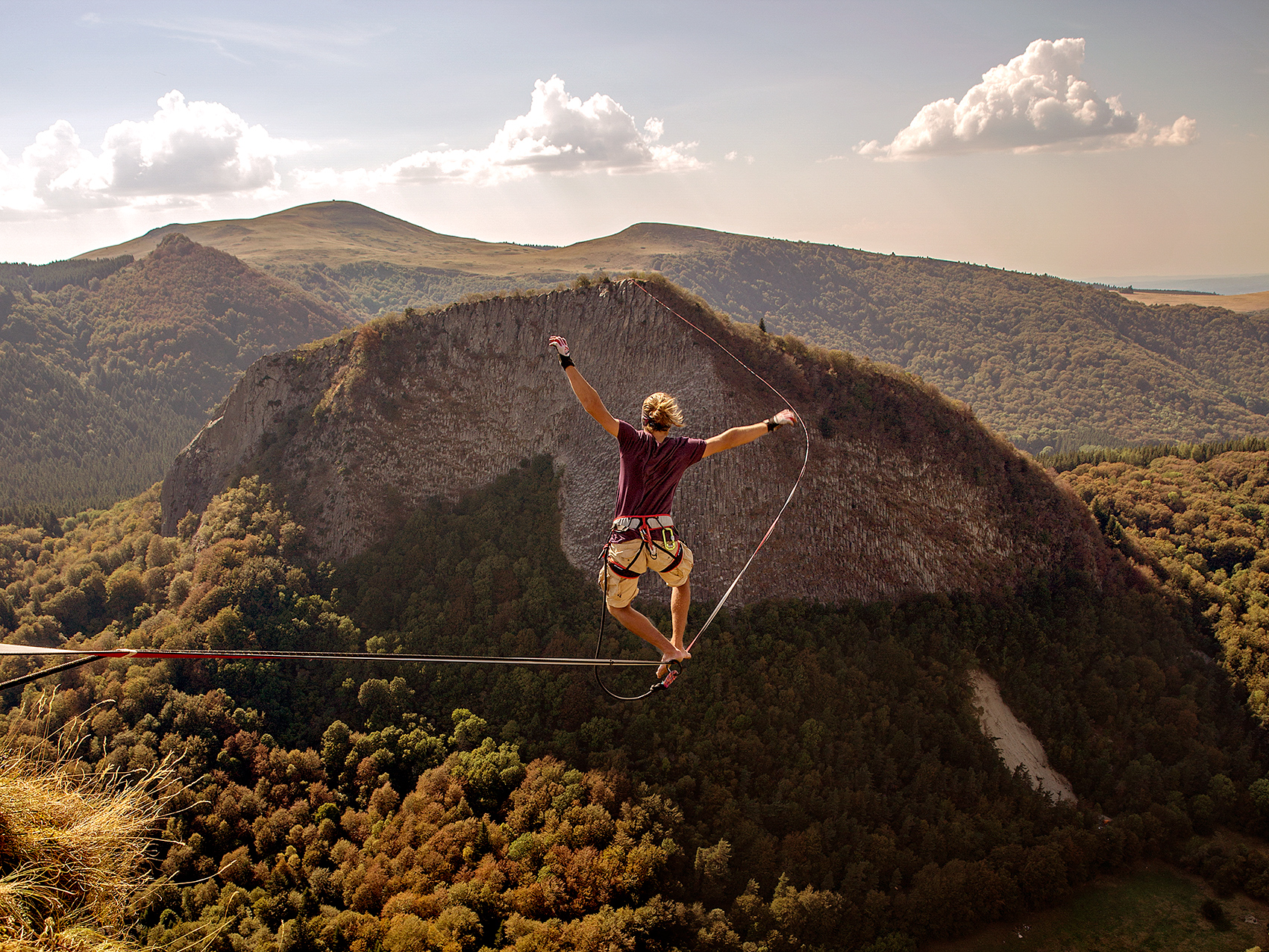
During strong winds in France

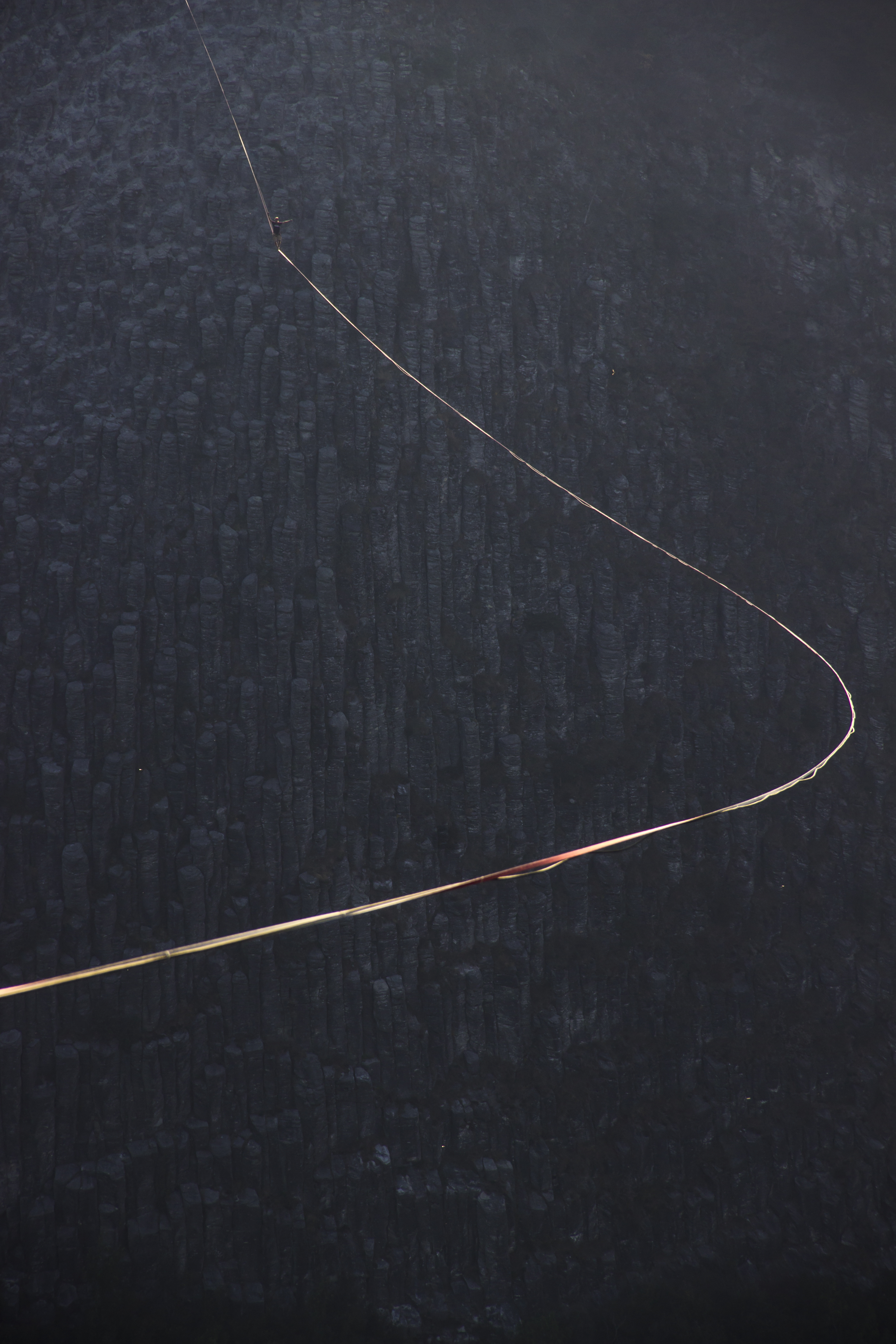
100 km/h storm

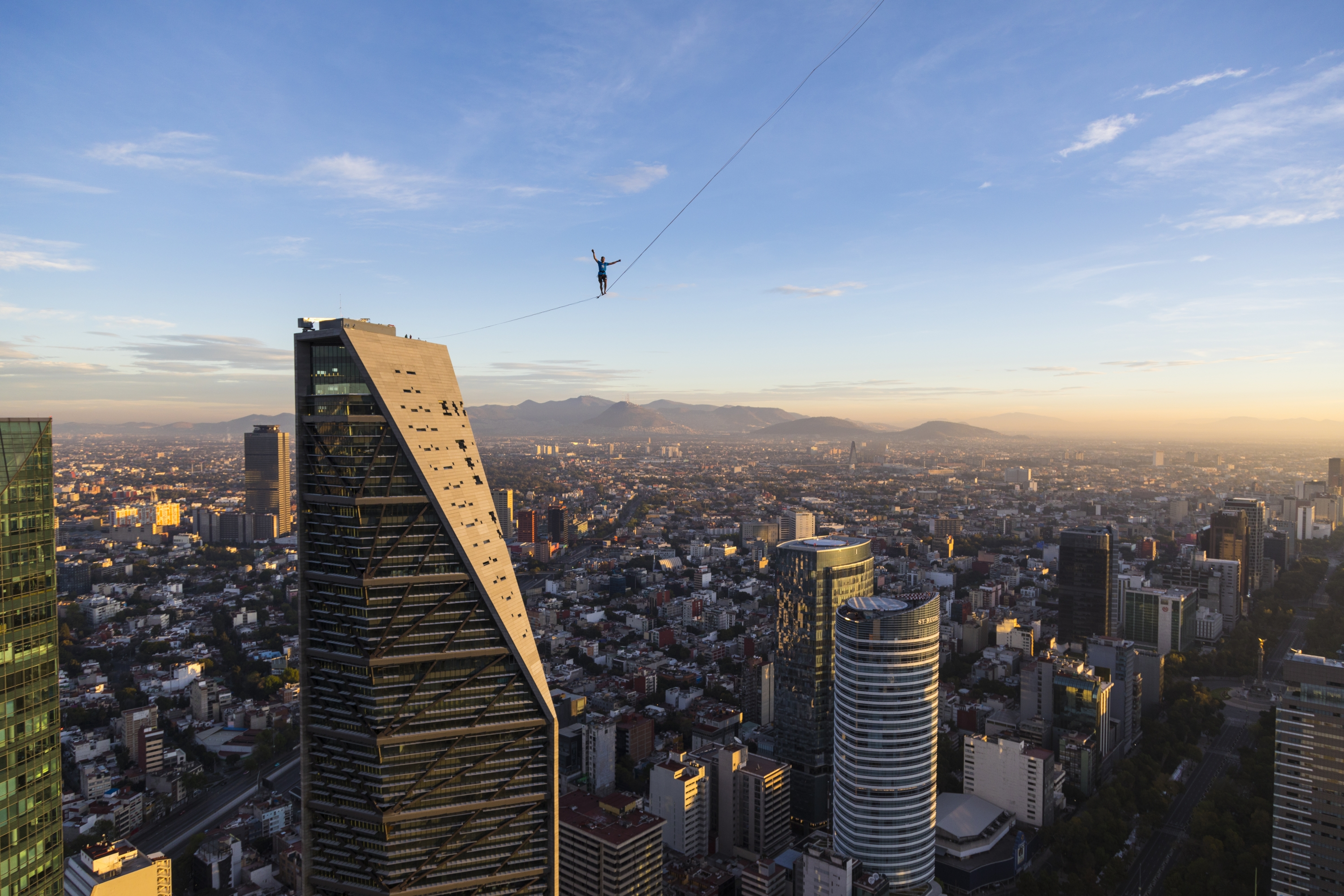
Schulz above Mexico City

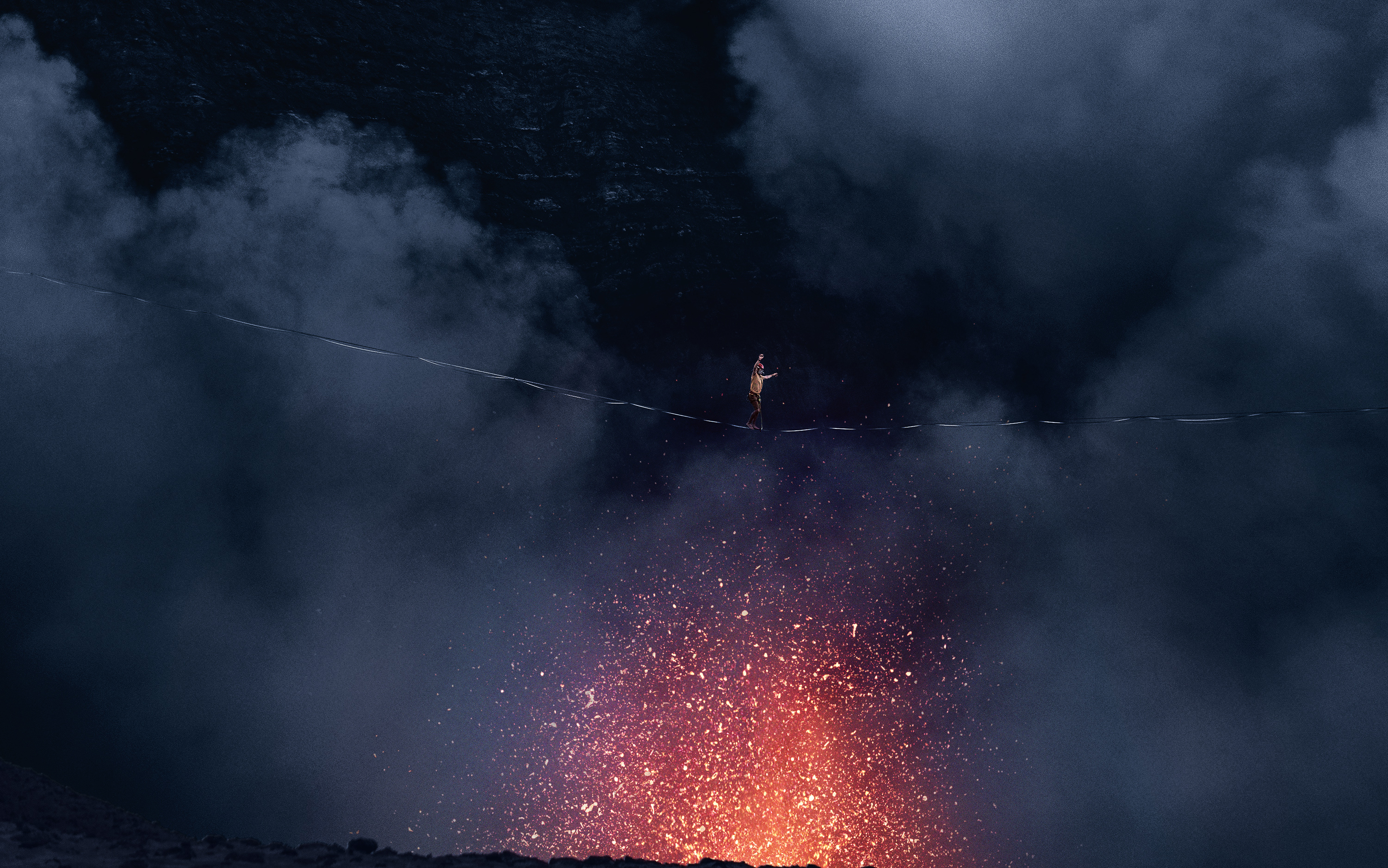
Schulz at the volcano Mount Yasur

== Slackline world records and other achievements ==
=== World records in main categories ===
Date	Category	Length / Height (no record in brackets)	Place (country)	Details
4 June 2011	Waterline	Length: 140 m	Uttendorf (AT)	During the Boulder- & Slackline festival Boulderjam 2011
21 June 2011	Highline	Length: 115 m (Height: 110 m)	Millau (FR)	During the Outdoor- & Music festival Natural Games
21.21.2011	Highline	Length: 119 m (Height: 100 m)	Consumnes River Gorge (USA)	Shared record with Jerry Miszewski
2 June 2012	Waterline	Length: 166 m	Uttendorf (AT)	During the Boulder- & Slackline festival Boulderjam 2012
13 June 2013	Highline	Length: 140 m (Height: 80 m)	Werdenfelser Land (DE)	Documented by German TV "Abenteuer Leben" (Kabel 1)
14 August 2014	Waterline	Length: 271 m	Helgoland (DE)	Advertising campaign for Germany's first 4k TV channel HD+
28 August 2014	Waterline	Length: 327 m	Eibsee (DE)	
19 November 2014	Highline	Length: 375 m (Height: 100 m)	Yangshuo (CN)	
9 May 2015	Longline	Length: 610 m	Inner Mongolia (CN)	Change of pretension during the ascent
18 September 2016	Waterline	Length: 535 m	Schnalstal (IT)	Within the scope of the 25 year anniversary of the discovery of Ötzi glacier mummy
May 2017	Waterline	Length: 674 m	WanFo lake (CN)	Within the scope of an internationalen Slackline competition - Shared with 10 other athletes
4 December 2017	Urban Highline	Length: 217 m Height: 247 m	Mexiko Stadt (MXN)	Longest and highest highline in urban environment
24-26 May 2018	Endurance Slacklining	Distance: 8 km	Spreitenbach (CH)	Longest distance walked on a Highline in one day (breaks and leaving the Highline were allowed) - Shared record with four other athletes during charity event
15 August 2018	Endurance Slacklining	Distance: 11 km	Villach (AT)	Longest distance walked on a Highline in one day (breaks and leaving the Highline were allowed)
15 April 2020	LavaLine	Length: 260 m	Yasur, Tanna (VANUATU)	First and longest Slackline ascent at an active vulcano

=== World records in sub-categories ===
Date	Category	length / height (no record in brackets)	Place (country)	Details
8 May 2012	Longline Polyester	Length: 300 m	Rosenheim (DE)	Longest polyester slackline sent
21 October 2012	Longline Polyester	Length: 340 m	Mitterbuch (DE)	Longest polyester slackline sent
9 September 2012	Highline Polyester	Length: 110 m (Height: 100m)	Hochkönig mountain range (AT)	Longest polyester highline sent
5 June 2014	Waterline Polyester	Length: 196 m	Ingolstadt (DE)	Longest polyester waterline sent
September 2015	Waterline Polyamid	Length: 202 m	Films (CH)	Longest polyamide waterline sent
16 October 2016	Highline Polyamid	Length: 650 m (Height: 200 m)	Auvergne (FR)	Longest polyamide highline sent - Up to 120 km/h strong storm during first try
5 June 2017	Highline Polyamid	Length: 680 m	Vancouver (CAN)	Longest polyamide highline - Circulating fog during the ascent

=== Other achievements and personal accomplishments ===
Date	Success / Leistung	Details	Place (country)
November 2011	Setup and walking of worlds first Space-Highline	With the help of participants of the 4. GGBY slackline Gathering	Moab, Utah (USA)
4 June 2011	Winner of Waterline Speed competition in Uttendorf	Fastest run over a 33 meter long waterline	Uttendorf (AT)
October 2012	Ascent of Germany's highest highline (2962 m)	Together with German skier Felix Neureuther at the peak of Germany	Zugspitze, Germany
July 2014	First Highline between cable cars in German speaking region	At cabins of the Zugspitz-Gletscherbahn	Zugspitze (DE)
August 2015	First highline at the Maunsell Sea Forts	As part of a film project, Schulz and his team set up highlines between English air defense towers from World War II.	Red Sands Sea Forts (UK)
26 November 2015	World's first combination of aircraft and slacklining	RedBull pilot Kirby Chambliss circled around Schulz in an aerobatic plane while he stood on a 250 m long highline.	Cerro Tetakawi, Sonora (MEX)
June 2016	Personal longest completed highline (800 m)	During the French Riviera Highline Meeting	Saint-Jeannet (FR)
9 July 2017	First highline at the Old Man of Hoy		Hoy, Scotland (UK)
17 August 2019	Highline-Show at the Federal Foreign Office	Highline-Show at the open day 2019	Berlin (DE)

== Literature ==
- Roanne van Voorst: Alles onder controle. Schuyt & Co Brandt, 2016, ISBN 978-9492037411.
- Alexander Schulz: Stille ist mein innerer Anker. In. Manu Theobald: stille ist. Adeo Publishing house, Asslar 2020, ISBN 978-3-86334-271-5.
