= Achany =

Coordinates: 57.9801°N 4.4199°W

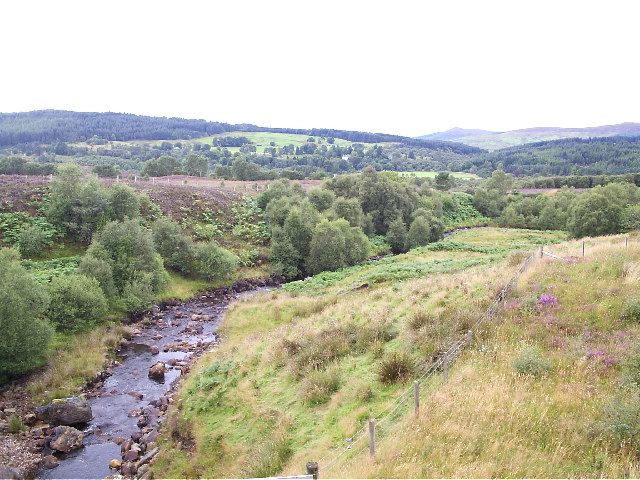
- Near Achany

- Location within the Sutherland area
- OS grid reference: NC572013
- Council area: Highland
- Country: Scotland
- Sovereign state: United Kingdom
- Postcode district: IV27
- Police: Scotland
- Fire: Scottish
- Ambulance: Scottish
- UK Parliament: Caithness, Sutherland and Easter Ross
- Scottish Parliament: Caithness, Sutherland and Ross

Achany is a hamlet in Sutherland in the Scottish council area of Highland, Scotland. It lies off the B864 road on the west bank of the River Shin south of Lairg. The hamlet, which includes the Achany Glen (or Achany Forest), is also home to a Category B Listed building, Achany House, and a wind farm development that garners a community benefit fund.

== Geography ==
Achany Glen is a mixed conifer forest of mixed broadleaf native woodland that lies to the west of the Shin Falls Visitor Centre. It contains many small glades, characterised by alders and birch coppice, as well as wood sorrel and moss. A trail spur, the salmon leap viewpoint, is located on the glen's Riverside Walk.

== Energy ==
Construction of an onshore wind farm began in April 2009 and was completed in 2010, generating 38 Megawatts through 19 turbines. The Achany Wind Farm Community Benefit Fund was launched in early 2010, provided by SSE, the wind farm's developer, and managed by the Scottish Community Foundation, a registered grant-making charity.

== Culture ==
The hamlet contains Achany House, a Category B listed building dating from the late eighteenth or early nineteenth century. At least three renovations were subsequently made, the first in the mid-nineteenth century, another in the mid-later nineteenth century, and yet another in the late nineteenth century. In 1840, the house was purchased by Sir James Matheson who added two bayed wings containing the lavish living room and dining room. Matheson's nephew added an upper floor in 1878 and an extension at the rear in 1885. In 1948, it was purchased by the Ministry of Agriculture and served as an agricultural college under the North of Scotland College of Agriculture from November 1953 until it became a hotel. Today, it is a private dwelling.

A tourist information office had been located between Achany Forest and the Falls of Shin. It was bought by Mohamed Al-Fayed in 2002 and converted into the most northerly outpost of Harrods.
