= Stoer Head Lighthouse =

Lighthouse in Sutherland, Scotland

Stoer Head Lighthouse Rubha Stòr
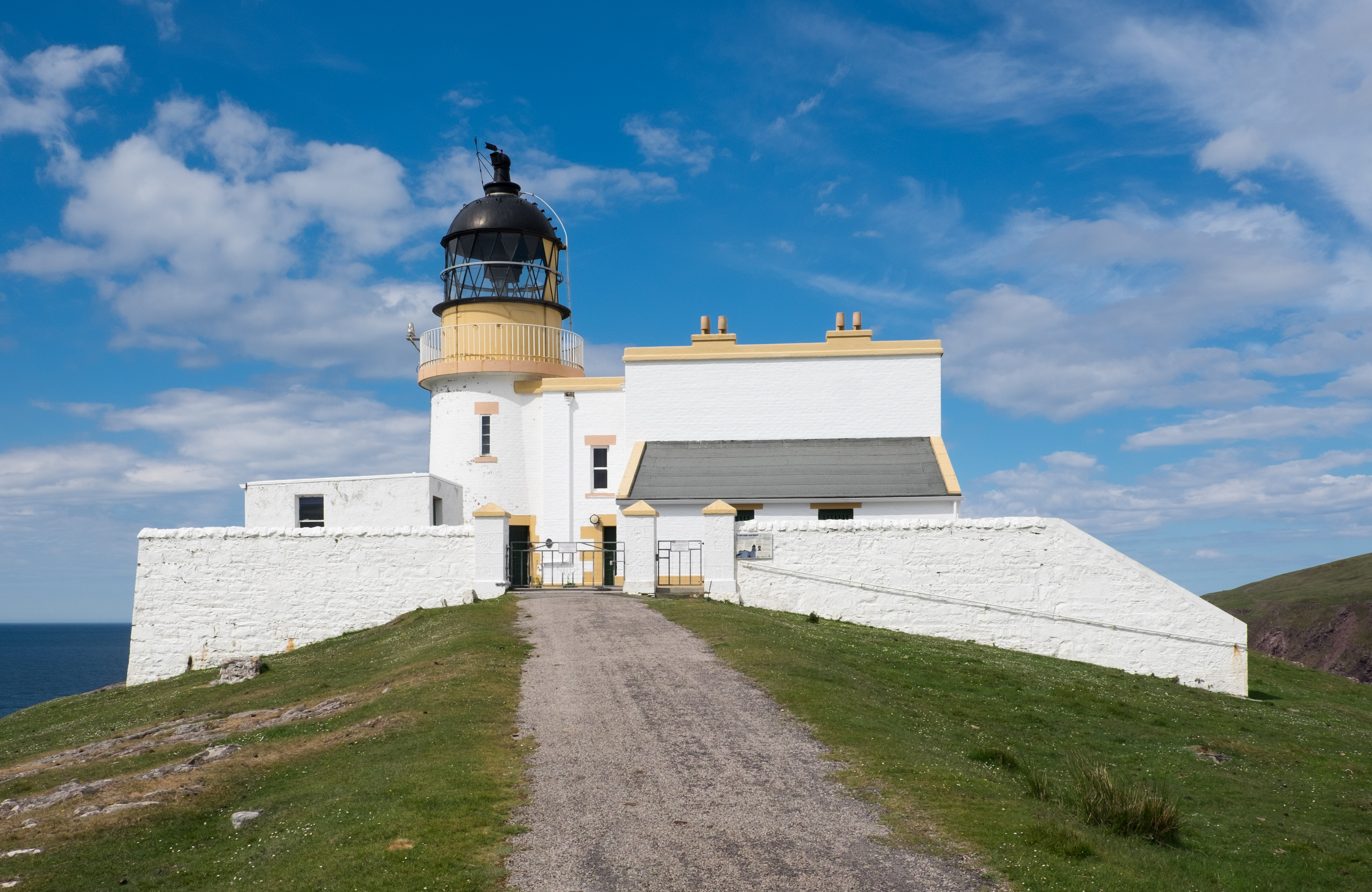
- Stoer Head Lighthouse 2016
- Location: Stoer Head, Lochinver, Highland, Assynt, United Kingdom
- OS grid: NC0037032967
- Coordinates: 58°14′24″N 5°24′09″W

Tower
- Constructed: 1870
- Built by: Thomas Stevenson, David Stevenson
- Construction: stone (tower)
- Automated: 1978
- Height: 14 m (46 ft)
- Shape: cylindrical tower with balcony and lantern
- Markings: white (tower), black (lantern), ochre (trim)
- Power source: mains electricity
- Operator: National Trust for Scotland, Northern Lighthouse Board
- Heritage: category B listed building

Light
- Focal height: 59 m (194 ft)
- Range: 24 nmi (44 km; 28 mi)
- Characteristic: Fl W 15s 59m 18M [Fl 0.4s - ec. 14.6s]
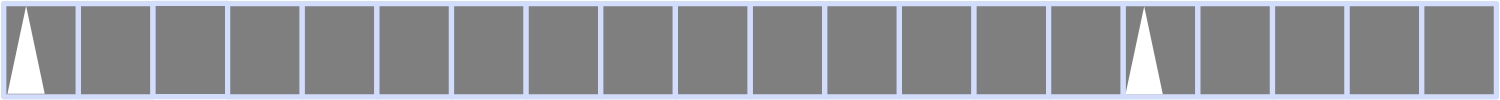

Stoer Head Lighthouse was built on Stoer Head by brothers David and Thomas Stevenson in 1870 after being identified as one of forty-five sites in Scotland where a lighthouse was necessary to protect shipping. The lighthouse is 45 feet (14 m) high, making it squat in appearance, but the height of the cliffs on which it sits means it can be seen at a distance of 24 miles (39 km) out at sea. The beacon flashes white every fifteen seconds.

== Location ==
The lighthouse is at grid reference NC003330 at the end of a 5 km long track which branches off the B869 Lochinver to Unapool road. Further North up the coast are the Old Man of Stoer and the Point of Stoer, which can easily be reached from the lighthouse on foot.

Around 10,000 visitors visit the lighthouse each year, necessitating the construction of a public toilet in 2013. The two keepers cottages have are now holiday homes.

== Construction ==
Mural depicting the east elevation of the Stoer Lighthouse in the Stoer Lighthouse Stores Bothy

Sea transport in the 1870s being the only feasible option for this remote site, the stone and other materials for the lighthouse were landed on a jetty built for the purpose about a mile to the south east of the lighthouse. No doubt, supplies for the lighthouse were similarly transported until roads became passable in the 20th century. The jetty (Ordnance Survey grid reference NC013320) is now in disrepair.

Close to the jetty is the Stoer Lighthouse Stores bothy which was used by the men building the lighthouse. In the bothy there is a mural depicting the east elevation of the Stoer lighthouse: the mural probably dates from the 1800s, certainly predating the sale of the bothy in the 1960s. The neighbouring (inland) bothy is known as the Salmon Bothy and was used to store salmon.

== Manual operation ==
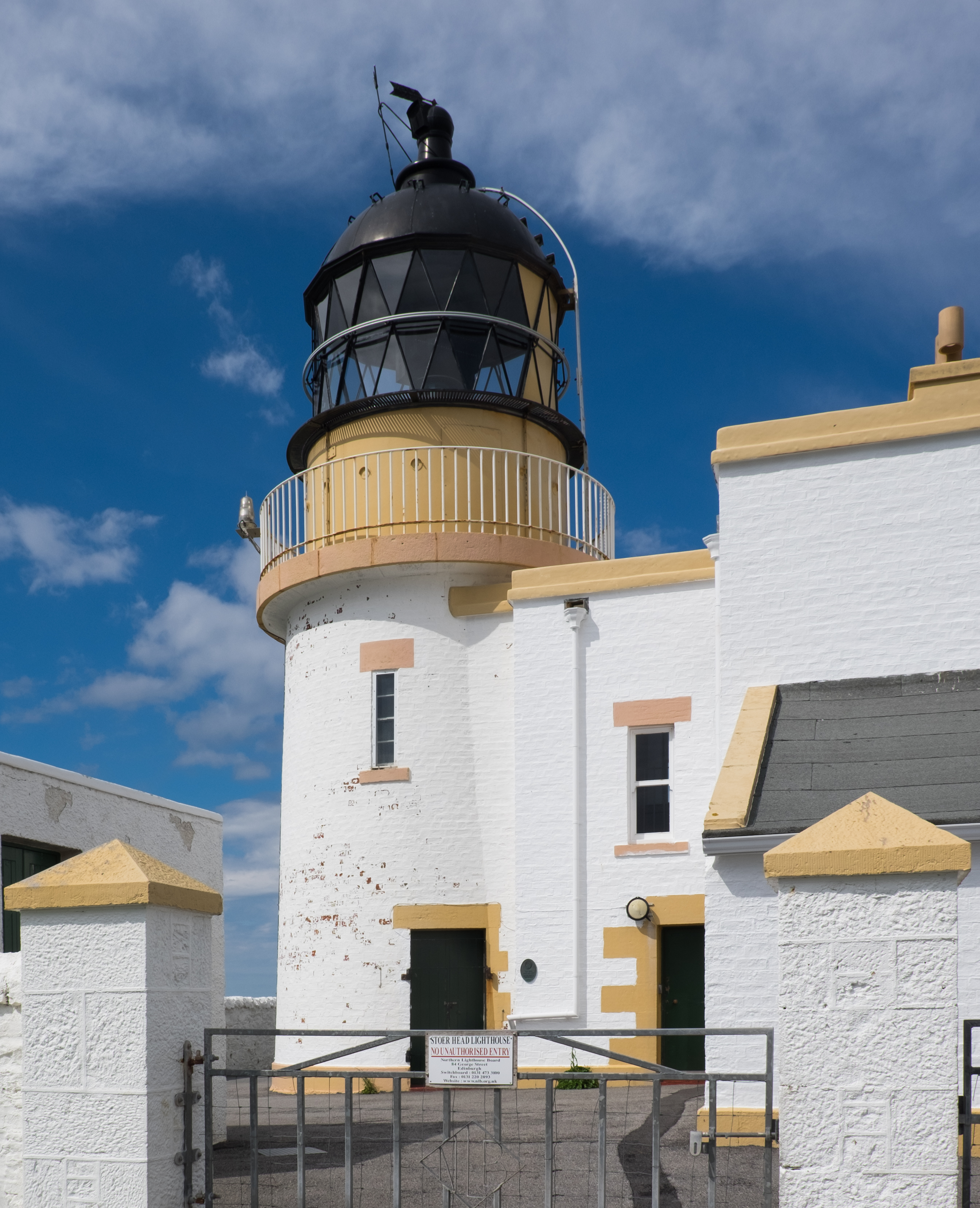
The lighthouse in 2016

The lighthouse was staffed by a principal lighthouse keeper and assistant until 1978, when it was automated. The remoteness of the assignment necessitated a degree of self-sufficiency, and there is ample evidence of their occupation, with the remains of the former byre, stable, cow shed, pig house and cart shed still visible nearby. The children were educated at the local school at Stoer for their primary education, but had to move to a boarding school for their senior studies as there was no senior school in the county of Sutherland.

== Present day ==
The lighting is now provided by an array of sealed beam electric lamps, operated by a sensor to automatically turn them on and off at specified light levels. Upkeep is carried out by a local who visits on a regular basis to carry out basic maintenance and cleaning, and technicians from the Northern Lighthouse Board who visit on an annual basis.

== See also ==
- List of lighthouses in Scotland
- List of Northern Lighthouse Board lighthouses
