= Richard Bacon (broadcaster) =

English television and radio presenter

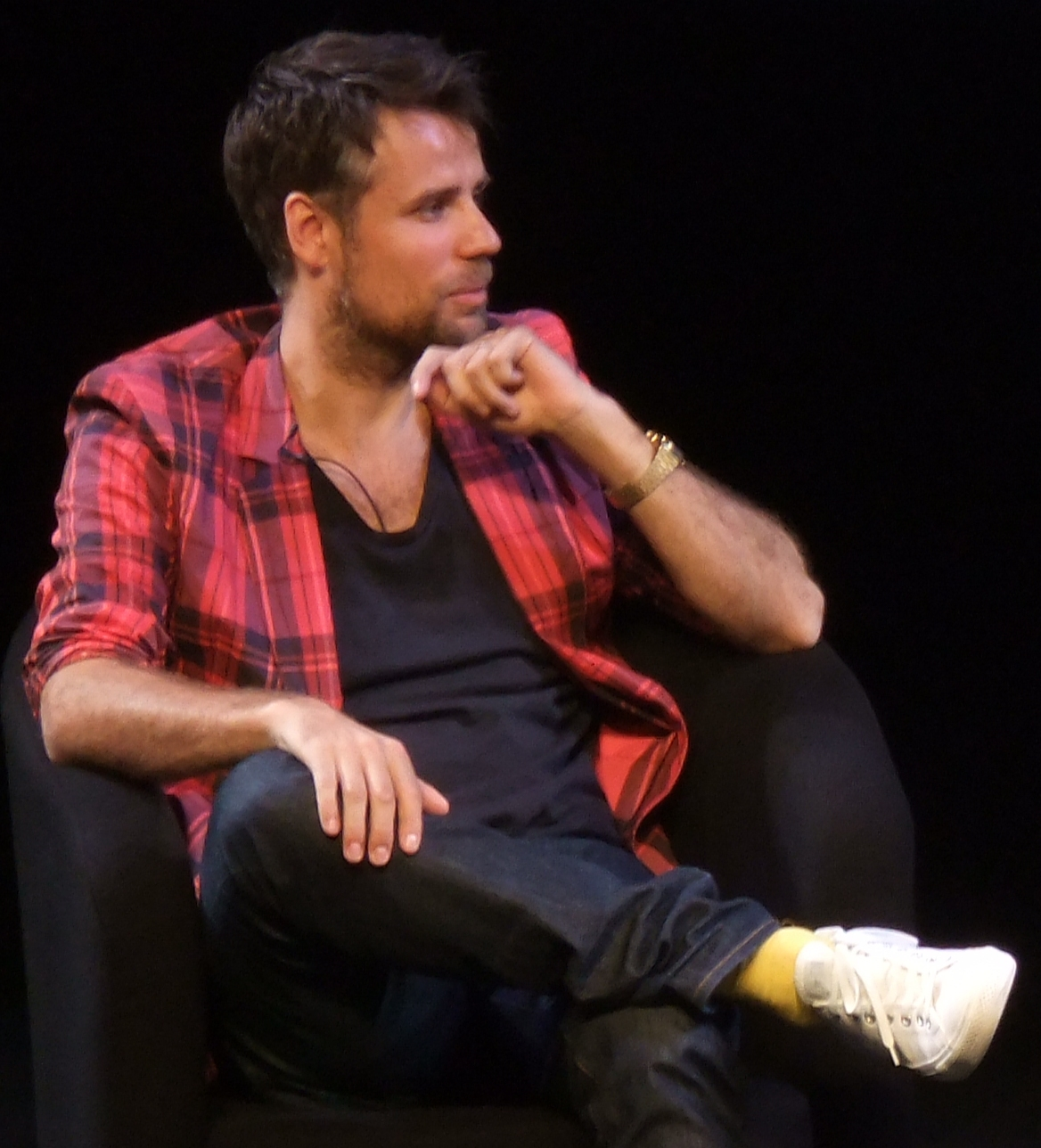
- Born: 30 November 1975 (age 50); Mansfield, Nottinghamshire, England
- Education: Worksop College
- Alma mater: Nottingham Trent University
- Occupations: Television and radio presenter
- Years active: 1993–present
- Spouse: Rebecca McFarlane (m. 2008)
- Children: 2

Richard Paul Bacon (born 30 November 1975) is an English television and radio presenter and producer. He has worked on television shows including Blue Peter, The Big Breakfast, Good Morning Britain, and on radio stations including Capital FM, Xfm London and BBC Radio 5 Live. In 2016, Bacon became the presenter of The National Geographic Channel's reboot of its documentary and panel discussion TV series, Explorer.

== Early life and education ==
Richard Bacon was born on 30 November 1975.

He was born and grew up in Mansfield, Nottinghamshire, and was educated at St Peter's Church of England Primary School on Bellamy Road, followed by two private schools, also in Nottinghamshire: at Wellow House School, a preparatory school in the village of Wellow, and then at Worksop College, a boarding school in Worksop. He studied business studies with electronics at Nottingham Trent University, but dropped out after a year.

== Career ==
Bacon's first job in the media was as a reporter for BBC Radio Nottingham, notably on the programme The Beat.

In February 1996, he joined L!VE TV as a reporter; this saw him being banned from the State Opening of Parliament, and having a beer thrown at him by Damon Albarn as he tried to interview him leaving a nightclub.

=== Blue Peter ===
Bacon's television break was as a presenter on the children's show Blue Peter, which he joined on 21 February 1997. He presented alongside Romana D'Annunzio, Katy Hill, Konnie Huq and Stuart Miles. He was the programme's first-ever presenter to have his contract terminated in mid-season, after the tabloid newspaper News of the World published a report of Bacon taking cocaine. His tenure on the programme lasted just over 18 months. The head of BBC children's programmes Lorraine Heggessey went on air to explain Bacon's dismissal to CBBC viewers. Bacon was required to return his Blue Peter badge. On the 60th anniversary of Blue Peter, former presenter Peter Purves presented Bacon with another Blue Peter badge.

=== TV career since Blue Peter ===
Bacon's television career survived the setback, and he has since presented such shows as The Big Breakfast, Top of the Pops, and reality TV shows Back To Reality and Castaway Exposed.

In August 2005, the band The Magic Numbers walked out of Top of the Pops, after Bacon made a remark that was widely thought to be about the body shape of members of the band; during rehearsals he referred to the band as a "big, fat melting pot of talent".

Between 2006 and 2011, Bacon narrated the BBC Three series Most Annoying People.

Bacon guest-hosted ITV's This Morning during 2005, Channel 5's The Wright Stuff on several occasions during 2007 and 2008, and BBC Two's Something for the Weekend from 2008 to 2009. He was the narrator for series 1 to 3 of Sky's police documentary Brit Cops.

In late 2010, he presented Richard Bacon's Beer & Pizza Club on ITV4. A second series aired in late 2011. Just before the 2010 World Cup he hosted a show called World Cup's Most Shocking Moments, with Peter Crouch.

Bacon presented editions of BBC Three's Young Voters' Question Time. He has made several TV cameo appearances as himself, including Hotel Babylon in 2007 (in which his character hires escort girls to play Scrabble with him all night), the episode "Video Killed the Radio Star" of the TV series FM, an episode of The Thick of It (both in 2009) and an episode of Psychoville in 2011.

In October 2011, he hosted BBC Three's Up for Hire, an interactive series over the course of five nights tackling one of Britain's biggest issues – youth unemployment. He also presented Brit Cops: Frontline Crime on Sky TV.

In April 2012, he presented the Channel 4 television series Hidden Talent, each programme of which featured ordinary members of the public taking tests in certain fields or skills to identify any previously unidentified talent.

On 13 January 2013, Bacon appeared on All Star Family Fortunes with his family playing against Louie Spence. On 25 November 2013, Bacon hosted one series of ITV's game show Show Me the Telly.

On 17 February 2014, he hosted a one-off show, Benefits Britain: The Debate, for Channel 4. In the same year he presented the live Channel 4 programme How Rich Are You?, about the UK economy.

In 2015, Bacon co-presented the first series of The Big Painting Challenge alongside Una Stubbs for BBC One, and sports show Eternal Glory for ITV. He also joined Reena Ninan as a substitute co-host of ABC's World News Now overnight and America This Morning news programme.

In November 2016 Bacon became the presenter of the National Geographic Channel's Explorer programme, which comprises several (usually three) short films, introduced by Bacon, involving matters of social, political, environmental or humanitarian significance. Each film is then discussed before a live studio audience with Bacon moderating, and usually includes the filmmaker or another representative of the film and at least one expert on either side of the issue. For the debut show, Bacon hiked through Yosemite National Park with President Barack Obama.

In June 2017, he began hosting a daily half-hour newsmagazine show called Top 30. It originally aired on Fox affiliates for four weeks before being picked up as a regular series, broadcast nationally across America in September 2017. On 13 September 2017, it was renewed through 2019.

In July 2019, he was a guest presenter filling in for Piers Morgan on Good Morning Britain.

In October 2019, the American TV network ABC commissioned his original "whodunnit" game show format The Hustler for an eight-part series, hosted by Craig Ferguson. Production began in the fall, with Bacon serving as one of its executive producers. It was cancelled in 2022. Richard Bacon has also produced This Is My House (2021–2022) and I Literally Just Told You (2021) presented by Jimmy Carr.

On the 15 May 2026, Bacon appeared on BBC Newsnight, hosted by Matt Chorley, as part of a 4 person panel, discussing the merits of the Mayor of Manchester, Andy Burnham standing for the Westminster Parliament, in a staged by-election for the Makerfield Constituency, (south of Wigan) to become an MP, in order to be eligible to challenge Labour Party leader, Keir Starmer the UK's Prime Minister.

=== Radio career ===
Bacon joined BBC Radio 5 Live to present the late-night show on Saturdays and Sundays. After this, he worked as an announcer for BBC 7 and then a DJ for Capital FM followed by Xfm London.

He returned to 5 Live, and from November 2007 until December 2009 presented the late-night programme, in which his sign-off ("Goodnight Great Britain, wherever you are") copied that of Jack Killian, the main character in the NBC television series Midnight Caller.

In January 2010, Bacon became the regular presenter of the 5 Live mid-afternoon show from Mondays to Thursdays, in which he replaced the departing Simon Mayo. The show covered news, sport, celebrity interviews and special features. On Tuesdays there was a TV review with Boyd Hilton and another guest, looking back over the week's television and previewing future programmes. In the Moan-In on Wednesdays, listeners could share their moans and receive marks out of 10 from Bacon and a guest, often Dave Vitty. On Thursdays the feature was Chart The Week, where two guests would discuss the week's most talked-about news stories. At the same time, Bacon started to present a regular Saturday afternoon show on BBC Radio 6 Music; he later left to concentrate on other commitments. He returned to 6 Music in January 2012 for six weeks to present a Saturday morning programme.

Bacon's afternoon show attracted criticism for its content, which was classified by the BBC Trust as "news". Rival broadcaster Talksport made a general complaint in 2010 to the BBC Trust, claiming the BBC Radio 5 Live station was not providing its mandatory 75% news output, "with many items falling outside of the remit, such as 'entertainment-based interviews' and listener-generated features." Talksport's complaint "particularly singl[ed] out Bacon's two-hour weekday afternoon show for criticism", finding in a poll that only 20% of listeners considered Bacon's show to comprise "news". In their response, the BBC Trust rejected Talksport's complaints, but admitted that a review was required to develop "'a more nuanced method of monitoring the proportion of news output' on 5 Live compared to the current system, which counts the whole of Richard Bacon's afternoon show as news".

In August 2011, Bacon recommended that his listeners should watch a YouTube video of comedian Doug Stanhope, in which he mocked Sarah Palin's disabled son Trig. The Down's Syndrome Association complained to the BBC about the broadcast, stating "the association is shocked that a BBC employee has publicised the work of a comedian which is nothing more than a vile offensive rant." Both Bacon and the BBC apologised for the broadcast, with Bacon writing "I full well understand my responsibilities as a broadcaster and such a reference fell below the standards I set myself personally in my broadcasting."

On 1 July 2014, it was announced that Bacon would be leaving BBC Radio 5 Live later in the year.

Bacon covered for Simon Mayo on his BBC Radio 2 Drivetime show, when Mayo was on holiday in August 2015 and in April 2016.

Bacon covered for Ian Payne on his LBC afternoon shows on 6 and 7 July 2019.

== Yes Yes Media ==
Bacon founded the unscripted entertainment venture Yes Yes Media in 2023. The company has offices in London and Los Angeles, and is backed by American actor and producer Courteney Cox, along with musician/producers Johnny McDaid and Savan Kotecha. It produces talent and game shows, collaborates with a video game company, and live streams content directly to viewers.

Yes Yes Media has formed a partnership with Satisfaction (media company), one of the largest producers of unscripted television in France. In April 2023, Yes Yes partnered with the global media group Sister, enabling access to a global network of media companies and investments, which include television, film, podcasting, publishing, and live events.

In September 2024, Yes Yes Media signed a deal with Tresor, a leading non-scripted production company in Germany owned by Keshet International, to provide non-scripted TV formats in Germany.

The company's first commission was Silence is Golden, a game show hosted by Dermot O'Leary, set to air on U&Dave free-to-air TV channel in 2025.

== Personal life ==
Bacon married Rebecca McFarlane in 2008. As of 2020 they were living in Los Angeles, California where Bacon works in U.S. television. They have two children. His father-in-law is John McFarlane, who served as chairman of Barclays from 2015 to 2019.

On 28 March 2018, Bacon explained to Nicky Campbell in an interview with BBC Radio 5 Live that at the age of 42 he was diagnosed with Attention deficit hyperactivity disorder (ADHD), about which he said "I like having it a lot, it is who I am. It's just learning to work with it and manage it means that life gets less chaotic and painful for my wife and children."

In July 2018, he was placed in an induced coma after becoming ill with pneumonia.

In October 2019, he discussed his alcohol addiction.

=== Charity ===
Bacon is a celebrity supporter of the British Red Cross and is particularly interested in their National Flood Appeal and international messaging services.
