= Emma Farrell =

Emma Farrell may refer to:

- Emma Forsayth (1850–1913), business woman and plantation owner, also known as Emma Farrell
- Emma Farrell (freediver) (born 1973), freediver and author
