= List of listed buildings in Assynt =

This is a list of listed buildings in the parish of Assynt in the Highland council area of Scotland.

== List ==
Name	Location	Date Listed	Grid Ref. (Note: Sometimes known as OSGB36, the grid reference (where provided) is based on the British national grid reference system used by the Ordnance Survey. • "Guide to National Grid". Ordnance Survey. • "Get-a-map". Ordnance Survey.)	Geo-coordinates	Notes	LB Number (Note: Historic Environment Scotland assign a unique alphanumeric identifier to each designated site in Scotland, for listed buildings this always begins with "LB", for example "LB12345".)	Image
Ledbeg, By Ledmore				58°04′28″N 4°59′00″W	Category C(S)	1827	Upload Photo
Lochinver Baddidarroch Road, Sunrise (L) And Inver Cottage (R)				58°09′21″N 5°14′20″W	Category B	1828	Upload Photo
Stoer Church and Old Burial Ground				58°12′07″N 5°20′10″W	Category C(S)	1831	Upload another image See more images
Calda House				58°09′50″N 4°59′13″W	Category B	1825	Upload another image See more images
Ardvreck Castle				58°10′01″N 4°59′44″W	Category B	1824	Upload another image See more images
Stoer Head Lighthouse				58°14′24″N 5°24′09″W	Category B	1833	Upload another image See more images
Inchnadamph, Former Assynt Parish Church (Church Of Scotland) With Graveyard, Walls And Gate				58°09′08″N 4°58′36″W	Category B	44967	Upload another image See more images
Inchnadamph Old Manse				58°09′03″N 4°58′17″W	Category B	1826	Upload another image
Stoer House				58°12′09″N 5°20′22″W	Category B	1832	Upload Photo
Lochinver Baddidarroch Road Free Church Of Scotland				58°09′20″N 5°14′20″W	Category B	1829	Upload another image See more images
Lochinver Bridge Over River Inver				58°09′20″N 5°14′15″W	Category B	1830	Upload another image See more images
Gleann Leirag Cottage Drumbeg				58°13′58″N 5°09′20″W	Category C(S)	6224	Upload Photo

== Key ==
The scheme for classifying buildings in Scotland is:

- Category A: "buildings of national or international importance, either architectural or historic; or fine, little-altered examples of some particular period, style or building type."
- Category B: "buildings of regional or more than local importance; or major examples of some particular period, style or building type, which may have been altered."
- Category C: "buildings of local importance; lesser examples of any period, style, or building type, as originally constructed or moderately altered; and simple traditional buildings which group well with other listed buildings."

In March 2016 there were 47,288 listed buildings in Scotland. Of these, 8% were Category A, and 50% were Category B, with the remaining 42% being Category C.

== See also ==
- List of listed buildings in Highland
