= Farquhar Matheson =

Scottish minister

Farquhar Matheson was a Scottish minister, who served as Moderator of the General Assembly of the Free Church of Scotland in 1939.

== Life ==
In 1920 he became minister of the Free Church in Assynt.

Soon after he was translated to Stoer. In 1939 he succeeded Rev John MacKay MacLennan as Moderator of the General Assembly.

== Family ==
Farquhar Matheson served as a minister and was father-in-law to Donald Lamont, who served as moderator in 1982, and maternal grandfather of Derek Lamont, Moderator in 2017. The Lamont family's ministry at St Columba's Free Church, Edinburgh has been significant - Rev. Donald Lamont (1964-1988), followed by Rev. John J. Murray, and then Rev. Derek Lamont (2002-2024). In January 2024, Derek was inducted to plant Hope Church in Leith, succeeded at St Columba's by Dr. Cory Brock.
