= Achinduich =

Coordinates: 57.9661°N 4.4005°W

Achinduich: Scottish Gaelic: Achadh an Dabhaich
- Location within the Sutherland area
- OS grid reference: NC572006
- Council area: Highland
- Lieutenancy area: Sutherland
- Country: Scotland
- Sovereign state: United Kingdom
- Postcode district: IV27 4
- Police: Scotland
- Fire: Scottish
- Ambulance: Scottish
- UK Parliament: Caithness, Sutherland and Easter Ross
- Scottish Parliament: Caithness, Sutherland and Ross

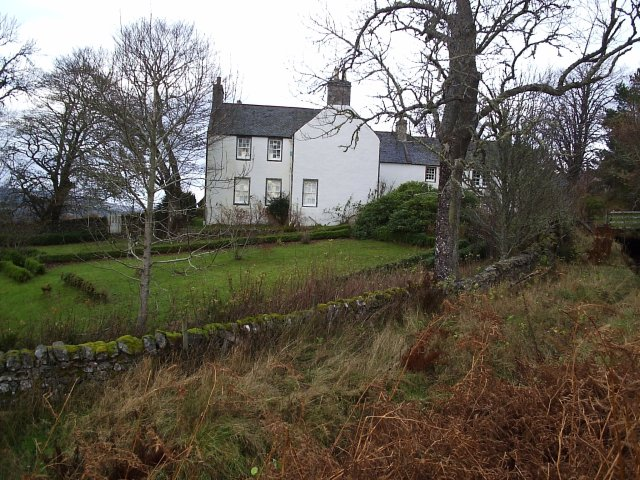
Achinduich Lodge. A Sporting Lodge near Lairg

Achinduich (Gaelic: Achadh an Dabhaich) is a hamlet on the east bank of the River Shin in the Scottish Highlands about 4 miles south of Lairg, Sutherland. It is in the Highland Council area.
