= Culkein =

Coordinates: 58.23777°N 5.34352°W

Culkein Stoer: Scottish Gaelic: An Cùl-cinn
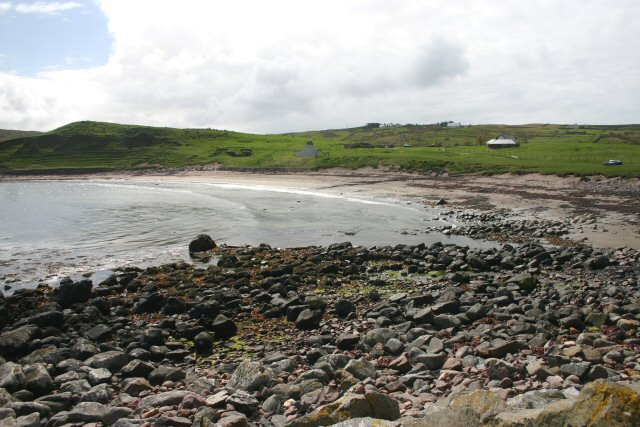
- Culkein Bay

- Location within the Sutherland area
- OS grid reference: NC038325
- Council area: Highland
- Lieutenancy area: Sutherland
- Country: Scotland
- Sovereign state: United Kingdom
- Post town: Lairg
- Postcode district: IV27 4
- Police: Scotland
- Fire: Scottish
- Ambulance: Scottish

Culkein Stoer (Scottish Gaelic: An Cùl-cinn) is a remote former fishing village, centred on the Bay of Culkein, in Assynt in Sutherland, Scottish Highlands and is in the Scottish council area of Highland.

The Old Man of Stoer is directly accessible from Culkein, being approximately 2 miles (3 km) north west of Culkein.
