= Hidden Talent =

- Presented by: Richard Bacon
- Country of origin: United Kingdom
- Original language: English
- No. of series: 1
- No. of episodes: 5

Original release
- Network: Channel 4
- Release: 24 April – 22 May 2012

Hidden Talent is a British television series broadcast on Channel 4. It is presented by Richard Bacon and features members of the public demonstrating specific skills. Each week ordinary members of the public take tests in certain fields or skills to identify any previously unidentified talent, and those that test highest in each area are trained by experts to maximise their potential in that skill. 900 people applied and were tested for the show.

== Episode 1 ==
Air date: 24 April 2012

Maggie Reenan, 45, a nurse and grandmother, is found to have a talent for rock climbing. She climbs the 200 ft Old Man of Stoer, a sea stack which can only be reached by swimming or a Tyrolean traverse across the sea. Meanwhile, Brenda Chamberlain, 63, a former bridal boutique owner, has the highest test results in lie detection, with an 80% success rate. After a two-day course in interrogation techniques run by former FBI agents in America, she detects which one of five people is not telling the truth, despite each being adept at lying.

== Episode 2 ==
Air date: 1 May 2012

Roxanne Messenger, 28, an art director at an advertising agency, is selected to master the skill of freediving. Trainer Emma Farrell tested the 900 applicants on their natural abilities to equalize the pressure in their ears and to hold their breath while walking and maintaining a normal heart-rate. Messenger was then sent to Egypt to train under free-diving instructor Marco Nones. Meanwhile, tractor factory worker Lee Yenson, who had no formal art training, was chosen to learn how to identify forged masterpieces. He tests extremely well in the area of aesthetic appreciation, and is trained by Professor Matthew Kieran. In his final test he is asked to identify a genuine Monet from a room of fakes, some of which were painted by famous forger John Myatt.

== Episode 3 ==
Air date: 8 May 2012

A homeless 19-year-old, James Whinnery from Birmingham, learns the Arabic language in 19 weeks. Whinnery has been living in a homeless shelter since an argument with his mother, and has failed to complete his A-Level exams. However, after a test involving working in a Turkish-speaking restaurant for a day after only a day's training in the language, he is identified as having a natural ability to learn foreign languages. His training includes learning 100 new Arabic words per day as well as a new alphabet, driving around London using an Arabic satellite navigation system, and ordering in an Arabic restaurant. He then travels to Jordan, where he is interviewed on Jordanian breakfast television.

== Episode 4 ==
Air date: 15 May 2012

Adele Reah, 26, a science teacher, is chosen by neuroscientist Dr Hugo Spiers from 500 people for her natural ability to navigate in the wilderness without a map or compass. Despite ambitions in her earlier life to join the RAF, Reah had been rejected both from a flight career and a navigation career on the grounds that her arms were too short, and so missed out on a career where her natural ability would have been particularly useful. Meanwhile, Jayson Khun-Dkar, a 34-year-old charity contracts manager, is selected by musical director Stuart Barr as having the potential to become an opera singer. He trains for five months to become a baritone, taking singing lessons and learning Italian, in order to audition for a production of La Boheme.

== Episode 5 ==
Air date: 22 May 2012

Cassie Gledhill, a 27-year-old track cyclist, is found to have the highest test scores ever seen by tester Professor David Strayer in the area of multitasking. Over three days she undertakes an intensive course in ambulance dispatching, a course that usually takes three weeks to complete. She must then co-ordinate emergency calls and ambulance crews on a busy Friday night in Birmingham. Meanwhile, three people are selected as having an exceptional ability for facial recognition. They are taken to Liverpool Street Station, where they must memorise the faces of 15 identically-dressed actors amongst the crowds. They then have to pick them out from an identity parade afterwards.

== Critical reception ==
Hidden Talent received mixed reviews. Zoe Williams in The Guardian praised its premise, saying: "I think Hidden Talent (Channel 4) may turn out to be a rare – possibly unique – instance in which a programme started out as a high concept in a meeting room, and then ended up being much much better than the idea." and "...there is in human nature this unshakeable joy in watching other people be good at things." She also praised presenter Richard Bacon, who she says is: "quietly charismatic, with his solemn manners, salt-and-pepper hair and whatever the opposite is of a poker face." However, Ceri Radford in The Daily Telegraph found it uncomfortable that the show had been "'inspired' by, rather than simply 'sponsored by', an international credit card firm." She also criticised its predictable format, admitting "...a certain weary sense of inevitability. It was justified: within eight minutes, one of the contenders was weeping with the emotion of it all, within nine, there was a dragging, manufactured attempt at suspense as the unlucky were eliminated, and within 11, there was the usual desultory home visit to misty-eyed relatives."
