= Old Man of Stoer =

Stack in Highland, Scotland

Coordinates: 58°15′39.51″N 5°22′57.76″W

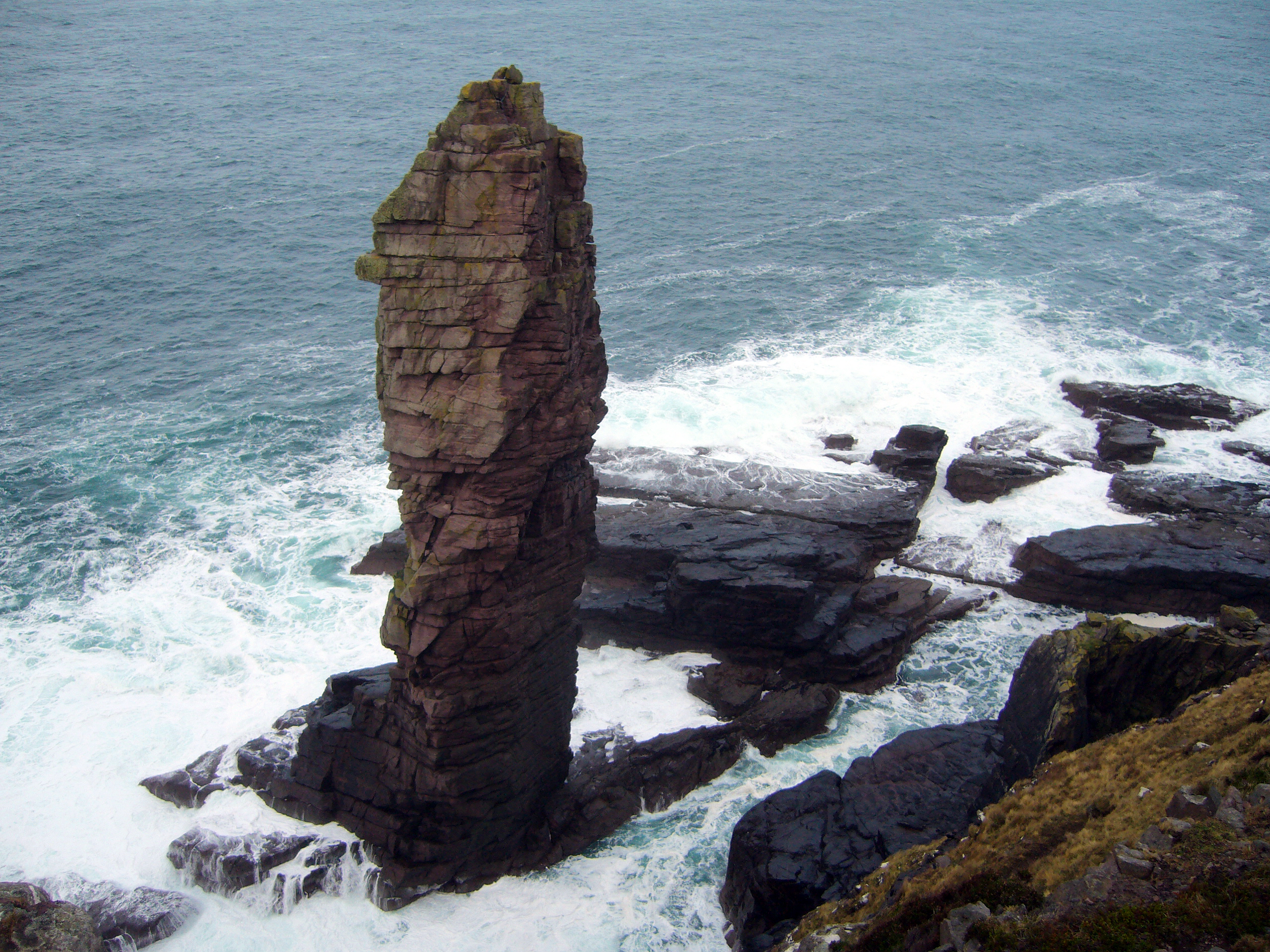
The Old Man of Stoer

The Old Man of Stoer is a 60-metre-high (200 ft) sea stack of Torridonian sandstone in Sutherland, Scotland, close to the villages of Culkein and Stoer and the nearby Stoer Head Lighthouse. It is a popular climbing route.

== Geography ==
The stack is composed of Stoer Group sandstone, and is 60 metres (200 ft) high. It is in The Minch, a strait in north-west Scotland, separating the north-west Highlands and the northern Inner Hebrides from Lewis and Harris in the Outer Hebrides.

Access is normally from the Stoer Head Lighthouse, which is within walking distance of the stack. The lighthouse is on the B869 Lochinver to Unapool road.

The seas around the Old Man of Stoer have claimed a number of vessels. There is believed to be the wreck of a fishing boat in the vicinity of the stack, which sank on 17 February 1953.

== Climbing ==
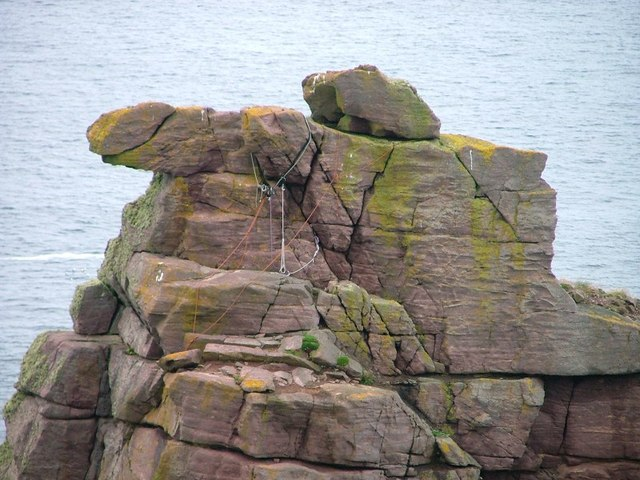
Climbing equipment left at the top of the stack.

The Old Man of Stoer is popular with climbers due to its height and approachability. It was first climbed in 1966 by Brian Henderson, Paul Nunn, Tom Patey, and Brian Robertson. Along with Am Buachaille and the Old Man of Hoy, it has become something of a legend among climbers.

In September 2024 Jim Miller, Alan Thurlow and 11-year-old Aden Thurlow, who lead climbed the route to the top and became the youngest person to lead the climb on “The Old Man of Stoer”.

To gain access to the foot of the stack, a Tyrolean traverse is necessary, which may require a swimmer to put it in place. There are a number of routes of varying levels of difficulty.

In the Channel 4 television programme Hidden Talent, 45-year-old Maggie Reenan climbed the stack after 18 days of intensive training, after her natural aptitude for climbing was discovered.

== Wildlife ==
Northern fulmars (Fulmarus glacialis) inhabit the stack and nearby sea cliffs. Other wildlife in the area includes the great skua (also known by its Norse name "bonxie") peregrines, pinnipeds and cetaceans.

Seabirds which can be seen include bonxies, guillemots, fulmars, razorbills and other birds including twite, skylarks, and dunlin.

== In Media/Television ==
- The 2010 TV series Men of Rock produced by the BBC about pioneering geologists working in Scotland. It is presented by Professor Iain Stewart.

== See also ==
- List of sea stacks in Scotland
