= Norman McLeod (minister) =

Presbyterian minister from Scotland

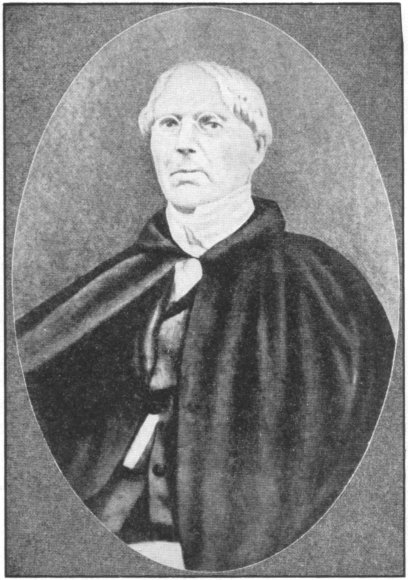
Rev. Norman McLeod

Norman McLeod (17 September 1780 – 14 March 1866; original spelling Macleod), a Presbyterian minister from Scotland, led significant settlements of Highlanders in Nova Scotia and ultimately in Waipu in New Zealand.

== Scotland ==
Born in Clachtoll to Donald and Margaret McLeod of Stoer, Norman spent his childhood days amongst the hills, lochans and peat bogs of remote Assynt. He worked fishing and farming and had a spiritual awakening as a result of being inspired by the preaching of "The Men", who were unordained dissenters from the established Church of Scotland. At the age of twenty-seven, he went to the University of Aberdeen to study for a Master of Arts degree. On graduating in 1812, he was awarded the Gold Medal for Moral Philosophy. To enable him to enter the ministry and be guaranteed a presbytery, he had to go to Edinburgh to complete a theology course. Before going to Edinburgh, he married Mary McLeod, who had long been his sweetheart and who would accompany him on his travels.

Norman left Edinburgh in disgust at the worldly ways of his professors, and did not finish his course. Norman and Mary moved to Ullapool, where he had been appointed as teacher at the SPCK school. Teachers with the Society for the Propagation of Christian Knowledge also doubled as lay preachers, and he soon came into conflict with the established minister Dr Ross. Norman refused to attend services taken by Dr Ross. When the McLeods wished their son John Luther baptised, they took him to Lochcarron, 40 miles to the south but Ross was there and his son remained unbaptised. Norman's stipend was stopped and in 1815 he went to Wick where he spent two seasons in the local fishing industry. Having burned all of his bridges in Scotland, he decided to emigrate to Nova Scotia.

== Nova Scotia ==
July 1817 Norman went alone to board the barque Frances Ann and set sail for the town of Pictou on the north coast of Nova Scotia. There was already a thriving Highland community there, mostly emigrants from Sutherland and Ross-shire. His family and close relatives came the next year.

Three different warring sects of Presbyterian were in Pictou under four ministers, and Norman drew people away from them all. Here he preached the Word, 'pure and incorrupted', as God intended. As his fame spread, his followers were dubbed Normanites. Norman was sued for libel by one of the ministers, Donald Fraser and the fine was 250 pounds. His friends and relatives coming from Scotland could not find land to settle next to each other. Some were fishermen and ship builders and traders and in 1819 they set out on the Ark to investigate St. Ann's as Cape Breton had lots of available land, and St. Ann's Bay was one of the best harbours on the East Coast. They built a 17-ton small schooner, the Ark, and with a crew of seven of his supporters—all seamen—went to St. Ann's Bay and claimed land there before returning to Pictou, where Norman faced his libel suit. They returned with families in seven small boats, including the Ark, on May 20, 1820, and were soon followed by 80 others from Pictou and direct from Scotland.

Norman did go to Western New York, near Ohio, the next year 1821 investigating the possibilities of ordination and it is possible that the original purpose was to drop Norman off at Halifax on the original Ark trip—where he would find a boat to Boston or New York and go overland to Ohio while the others cleared land etc. This may be how this Ohio story may have started. It would have been impossible to take that schooner up the Mississippi, and these men, being mariners, would have known that. Many ships from the Caribbean came to Pictou .The people writing about the story knew nothing about this. Norman did correspond with relatives from New Lisbon, Ohio. He also made three trips to nearby New York, finally getting ordained on his third in 1827.

Thus, at last, he was a sanctioned minister to his flock and in 1829, he built a school. Whilst by the early 1840s his meeting house with seating for 1200 was overflowing every Sabbath, his home church had been riven apart and the Free Church of Scotland had broken away.

Facing as it does northeast, St Ann's Bay suffered the worst of severe winters, and access to the community was frequently blocked by sea ice, stopping all trade in or out. When potato blight struck in 1847–48, the hardships were too much for many who felt the need to find greener pastures elsewhere. They had become quite successful, and the fishery trade had failed because of Free Trade agreements with the US. The timber trade was failing and there was no land left for the next generation and many were leaving for Ontario and the "Boston States". One of Norman's sons sailed back to Scotland, and then on to Australia, where he found work as a journalist. His letters describing the wonderful life he had found there unsettled the folk in St. Ann's. At the age of 68, Norman moved to Australia.

The first priority was to build ships and throughout 1850 and into 1851 the skills of the highland boatbuilders were put to full use. By October 1851, the Margaret, a barque of 236 tons, was afloat, and the smaller Highland Lass was nearing completion. In early November, Norman and Mary with seven of their children, and 150 other Normanites set sail. Having called at Cape Town en route, they arrived in Adelaide in April 1852. Highland Lass, carrying another 155 parishioners, arrived in October.

== Adelaide, Australia ==
Adelaide was in the grip of a goldrush. Gold had been found at Ballarat, near Melbourne, and the accompanying greed and violence made Adelaide a misery for the Normanites. As they had sold the 'Margaret', they were trapped. When three of his six sons died of typhus, Norman believed that the Old Testament prophesy of plague and pestilence as a punishment for the worship of false gods was coming true.

== Waipu, New Zealand ==
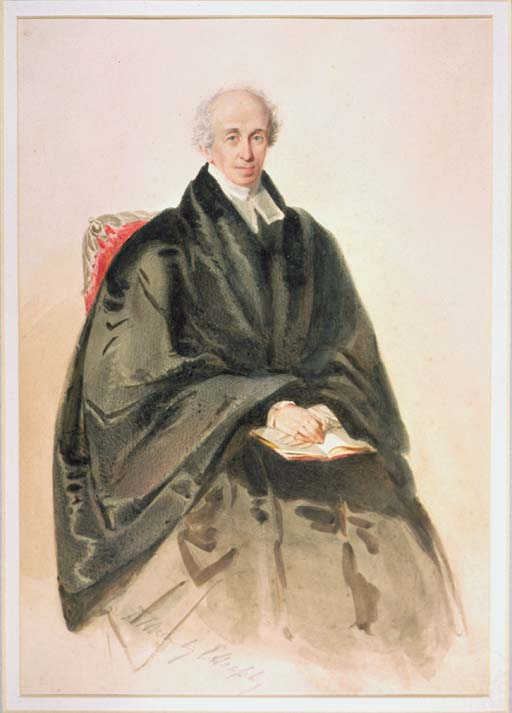
A portrait of McLeod, executed by Charles Heaphy

In early 1853, he wrote to the Governor of New Zealand, Sir George Edward Grey, asking for a grant of land for his people.The owners of the Highland Lass arrived and took over the negotiations along with Norman's son, Donald. The MacKenzie Captains sold the Highland Lass and purchased a schooner the 'Gazelle', and set off with mostly Highland Lass people and a few from the Margaret to Auckland. On 21 September 1853, their group is reported to have landed in the North Island. They negotiated with the Government for a block of land. Norman and his family followed four months later and stayed in Auckland. Waipu was on the northern east coast, between Auckland and the Bay of Islands, in the area around the Waipu River and Whangārei Heads. This land was virgin bush and forest, and being coastal, the skills of the Cape Breton Highlanders could be fully employed. The Normanites had found a permanent home. By the end of 1859, four more shiploads had arrived. It is reckoned that by 1860 there were 883 people there representing 19 Scottish clans. Many of the people on the other four boats were not Normanites, as they came from other neighbouring communities of Baddeck Middle River and Boularderie, but were Free Church presbyterians which is very close in theology. They were related to the people on the first two ships.

Norman lived happily in Waipu until his death in 1866. His flock continued in their Presbyterian Normanite ways, but as the years passed and they intermarried and moved away, their Gaelic roots dwindled as they became New Zealanders. The Gaelic language persisted until the turn of the century and they began holding Highland Games in the 1870s. Held at New Year, they are now the largest in the Southern Hemisphere.

== Memorials ==
There are memorial stones to Norman McLeod's memory in Clachtoll near Lochinver, Scotland and St. Ann's, Nova Scotia. The Waipu Scottish Migration Museum is a museum to the memory of all the Scots who went along the route taken by Rev Norman McLeod and his Normanites.

McLeod's property on St. Ann's Bay in Nova Scotia was developed into the Gaelic College of Celtic Arts and Crafts during the 1930s. The Gaelic College remains the centre of Gaelic education in Canada.

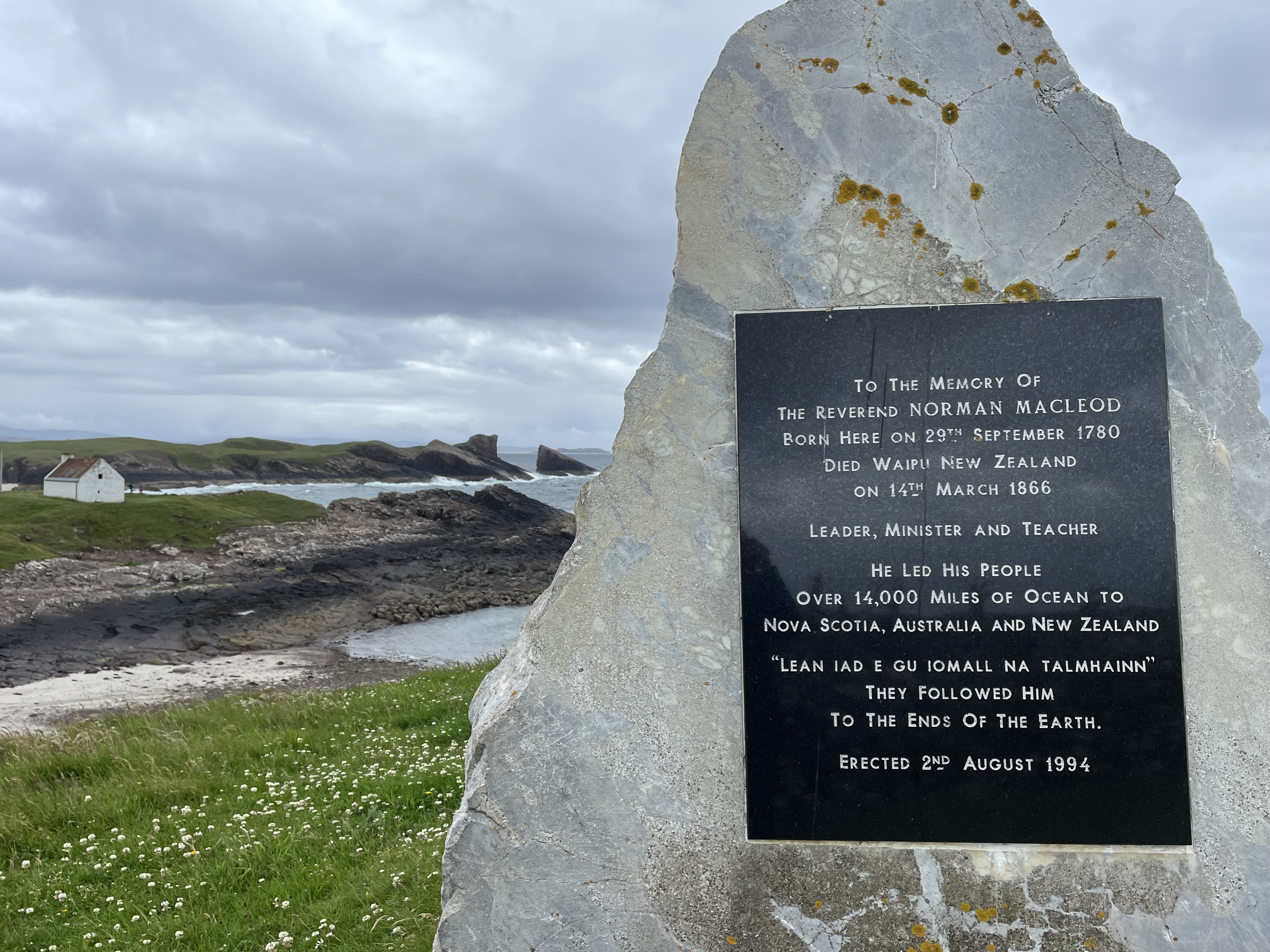
Macleod Memorial at Clachtoll, Scotland

== Contemporary bibliography ==
- John Dunmore: Wild Cards: Eccentrics from the New Zealand Past: Auckland: New Holland: 2006: ISBN 1-86966-132-X
- Flora MacPherson: Watchman Against the World: The Story of Norman McLeod and His People: Wreck Cove, Nova Scotia: Breton Books: 1993: ISBN 1-895415-20-9
- Neil Robinson: To the Ends of the Earth: Norman McLeod and the Highlanders Migration to Nova Scotia and New Zealand: Auckland: HarperCollins: 1997: ISBN 1-86950-265-5
- Neil Robinson: Lion of Scotland: Edinburgh: Birlinn: 1999: ISBN 1-84158-009-0 (originally published 1952)
