= Stoer Head =

Stoer Head (Scottish Gaelic: Rubha Stoer) is a point of land north of Lochinver and the township of Stoer in Sutherland, North Western Scotland. The lighthouse, built in 1870, marks the northern entrance to The Minch.

The peninsula is about 6 km (4 miles) long and 3 km (2 miles) wide, and has a number of scattered small settlements including Culkein, Balchladich and Achnacarnin.
