= John MacKay MacLennan =

Scottish minister

John MacKay MacLennan (1885–1977) was a Scottish minister, who served as Moderator of the General Assembly of the Free Church of Scotland in 1938.

== Life ==
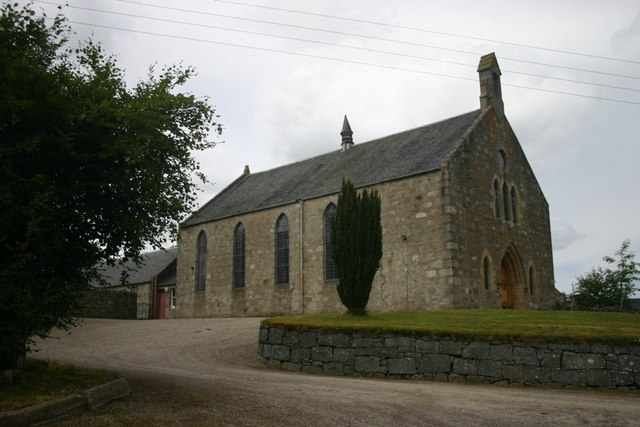
Lairg Free Church

He graduated with an MA from the University of Edinburgh in 1915.

From 1915 to 1923 he was minister of the Free Church in Glenurquhart then minister of Lairg Free Church from 1923 to 1965.

He died in Inverness on 25 August 1977, aged 92, and is buried in the churchyard at Kirkton of Lochalsh, a hamlet near Balmacara.
