= Zugspitze Glacier Cable Car =

Cable car in Germany

Coordinates: 47°24′49.350892″N 10°58′48.53″E

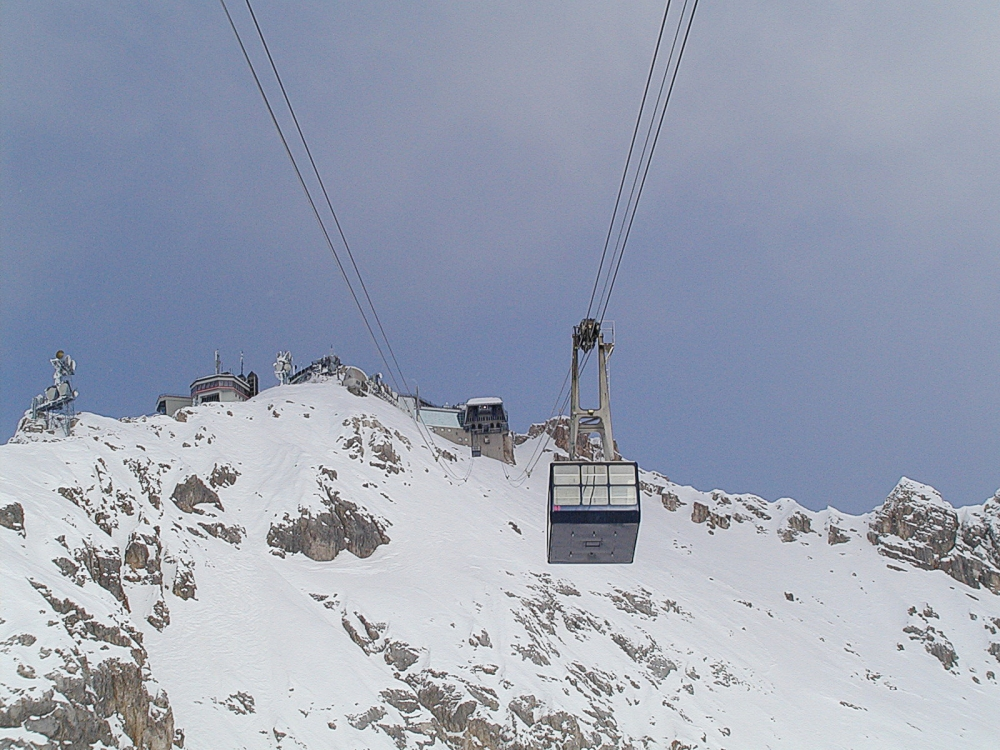
Zugspitze Glacier Cable Car

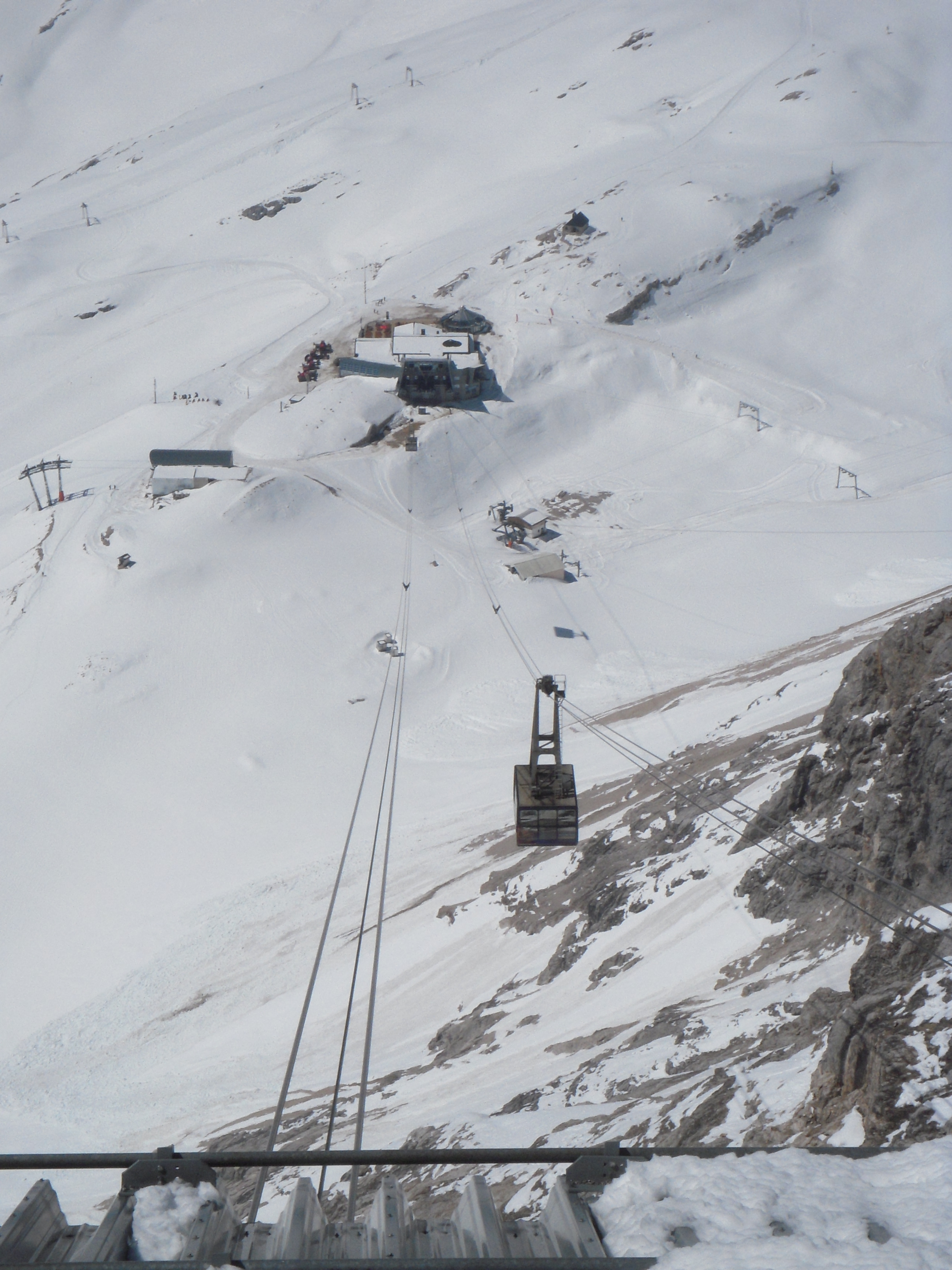
Seen from the summit

The Zugspitze Glacier Cable Car (German: Zugspitz-Gletscherbahn) is a 1,000 metre long cable car on the Zugspitze, Germany's highest mountain. It was opened in 1992 and links the plateau of the Zugspitzplatt directly with the summit, 360 metres higher. Since the mountain station of the Bavarian Zugspitze Railway was moved from the Schneefernerhaus to the Platt, the Schneefernerhaus and the old cableways, which ran down into the valley from the Platt (the Hangbahn and alte Gletscherbahn) and up to the summit (Gipfelseilbahn), have lost their importance.

The cableway, which is operated by the Zugspitzbahn AG, is a reversible system with two carrying cables and no pylons. Its carrying cables have a diameter of 50 mm; its hauling cable a diameter of 34 mm. The system is powered by 2 210 kW motors in the valley station. The cabins have a capacity of 100 people and can transport 1,000 people per hour in each direction.

The cableway was built by the South Tyrolean firm of Hölzl Seilbahnbau.
