= Falls of Shin =

Waterfall on River Shin, Highland, Scotland

Coordinates: 57.96104°N 4.40840°W

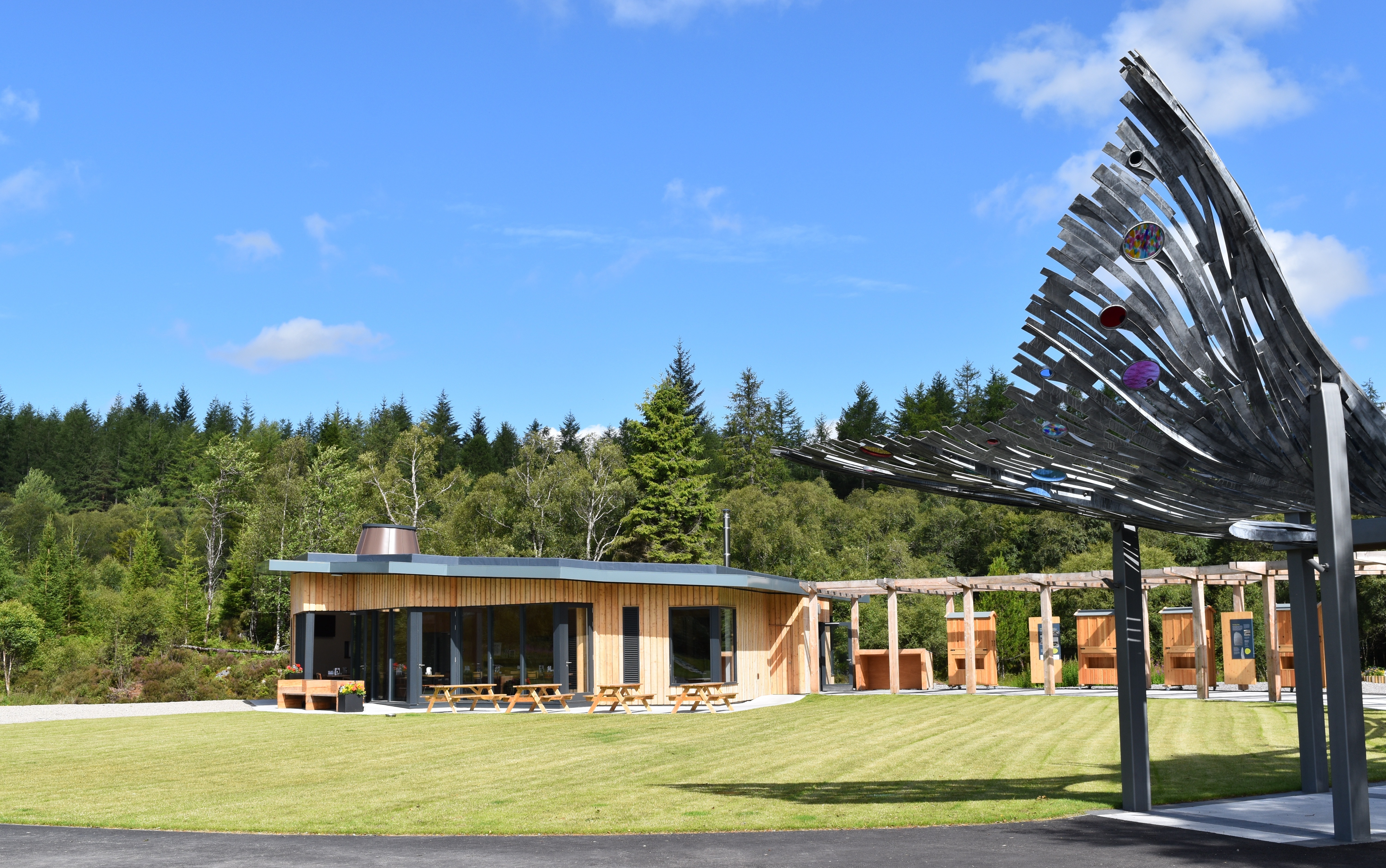
New Falls of Shin Visitor Centre

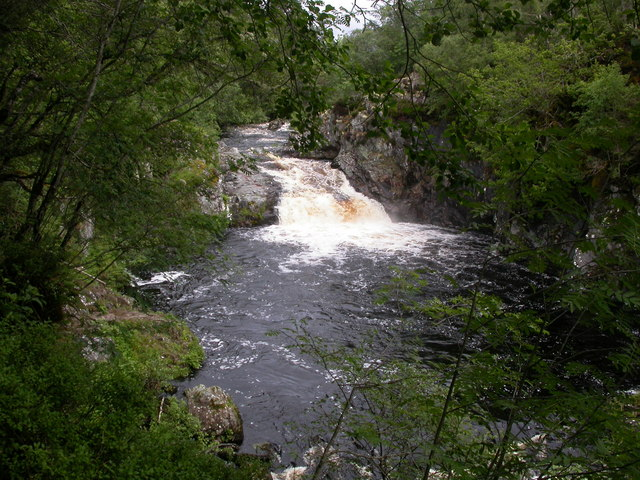
Falls of Shin

Falls of Shin is a waterfall on the River Shin, in northern Scotland, near the villages of Bonar Bridge and Lairg.

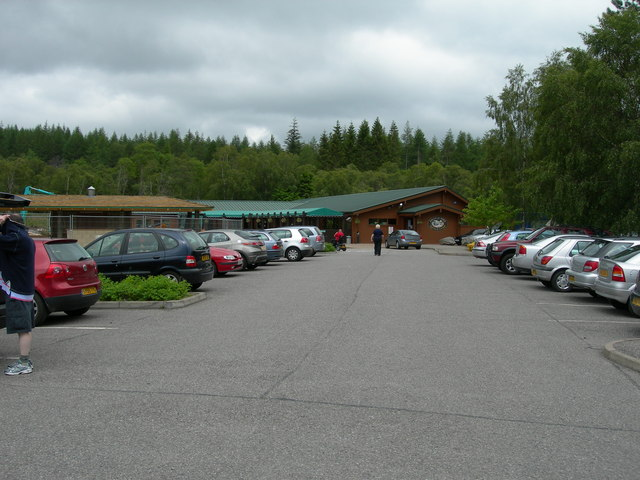
Visitor centre, 2008

Falls of Shin had a popular visitor centre, managed as part of Balnagown Estates, a company owned by former Harrods boss Mohamed Al-Fayed. This included a restaurant, a branch of Harrods, and a waxwork model of Al-Fayed. The visitor centre was destroyed by a fire in May 2013. Balnagown Estates have since been working with the Kyle of Sutherland Development Trust to develop a new visitor attraction. In May 2017, the new visitor centre opened following the successful construction carried out by William Gray Construction. The opening event was dubbed "Celebra-Shin". The cafe is currently operated by Mac & Wild- a company created by Andy Waugh and Calum MacKinnon with 2 restaurants in London and Falls of Shin being their third.

The Falls of Shin were dynamited to improve the salmon access.

Aside from the Salmon Viewing Platform, the site also comprises a Mini Golf Course, Woodland Walks and a large Children's Playpark.

== See also ==
- Waterfalls of Scotland
