= Old Man of Hoy =

Sea stack in Orkney, Scotland

- Sea stack
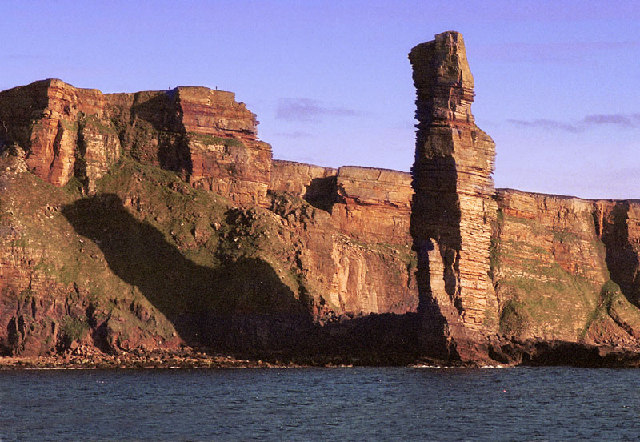
- The Old Man of Hoy from the north

- Location within Orkney Islands
- Coordinates: 58.88570°N 3.43299°W
- Grid position: HY 17635 00779
- Location: Hoy, Orkney, Scotland
- Geology: Old Red Sandstone sea stack
- Elevation: 137 metres (449 feet)
- First ascent: Chris Bonington, Rusty Baillie and Tom Patey, 19 July 1966

The Old Man of Hoy is a 137-metre (449-foot) sea stack on Hoy, part of the Orkney archipelago off the north coast of Scotland. Formed from Old Red Sandstone, it is one of the tallest stacks in the United Kingdom. The Old Man is popular with climbers, and was first climbed in 1966. Created by the erosion of a cliff through hydraulic action some time after 1750, the stack is not more than a few hundred years old, and may soon collapse into the sea.

== Geography ==
The Old Man stands close to Rackwick Bay on the west coast of Hoy, in Orkney, Scotland, and can be seen from the Scrabster to Stromness ferry. From certain angles it is said to resemble a human figure.

Winds are faster than 8 metres per second (18 mph) for nearly a third of the time, and gales occur on average for 29 days a year. Combined with the depth of the sea, which quickly falls to 60 metres (200 ft), high-energy waves on the western side of Hoy lead to rapid erosion of the coast.

== Geology ==
The Old Man of Hoy is a red sandstone stack, perched on a plinth of basalt rock, and one of the tallest sea stacks in the UK. It is separated from the mainland by a 60-metre (200 ft) chasm strewn with debris, and has nearly vertical sides with a top just a few metres wide. The rock is composed of layers of soft, sandy and pebbly sandstone and harder flagstones of Old Red Sandstone, giving the sides a notched and slab-like profile.

== History ==
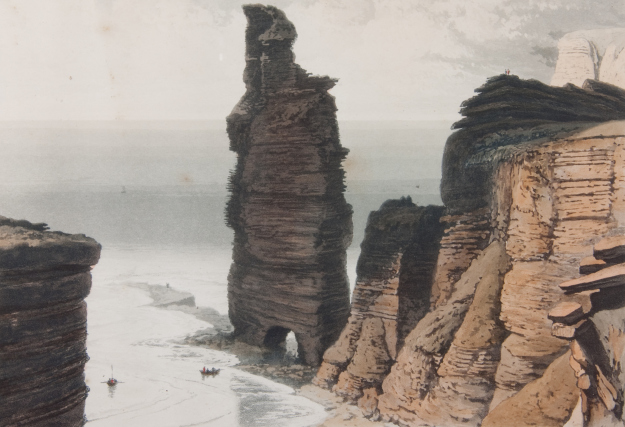
The Old Man of Hoy in 1817, when it had two legs. Painting by Daniell Oldman (1769‑1837).

The Old Man is probably less than 250 years old and may be in danger of collapsing. The stack is not mentioned in the Orkneyinga saga, written c.1230, and on the Blaeu map of 1600, a headland exists at the point where the Old Man is now. The McKenzie map of Hoy of 1750 similarly shows a headland but no stack, but by 1819 the Old Man had been separated from the mainland. William Daniell sketched the sea stack at this time as a wider column with a smaller top section and an arch at the base, from which it derived its name.

Sometime in the early nineteenth century, a storm washed away one of the legs leaving it much as it is today, although erosion continues. By 1992, a 40-metre (130 ft) crack had appeared in the top of the south face, leaving a large overhanging section that will eventually collapse.

== Human activity ==
=== Climbing ===
The first ascent of the stack was by the mountaineers Chris Bonington, Rusty Baillie, and Tom Patey in 1966. From 8 to 9 July 1967, an ascent featured in The Great Climb, a live BBC three-night outside broadcast, which had around 15 million viewers. This featured three pairs of climbers: Bonington and Patey repeated their original route, whilst two new lines were climbed by Joe Brown and Ian McNaught-Davis and by Pete Crew and Dougal Haston.

In 1968 Christine Crawshaw became the first woman to reach the summit of Hoy. In 1997, Catherine Destivelle made a solo ascent of the Old Man of Hoy; she did so while four months pregnant; her climb is captured in the 1998 climbing film, Rock Queen. This climb was filmed and has often been credited as the first solo ascent, but the Old Man had previously been soloed in October 1985 by Scots climber Bob Duncan; like Destivelle, he backroped the second, crux pitch, though he also backroped the top pitch because "it looked harder from below than it turned out to be".

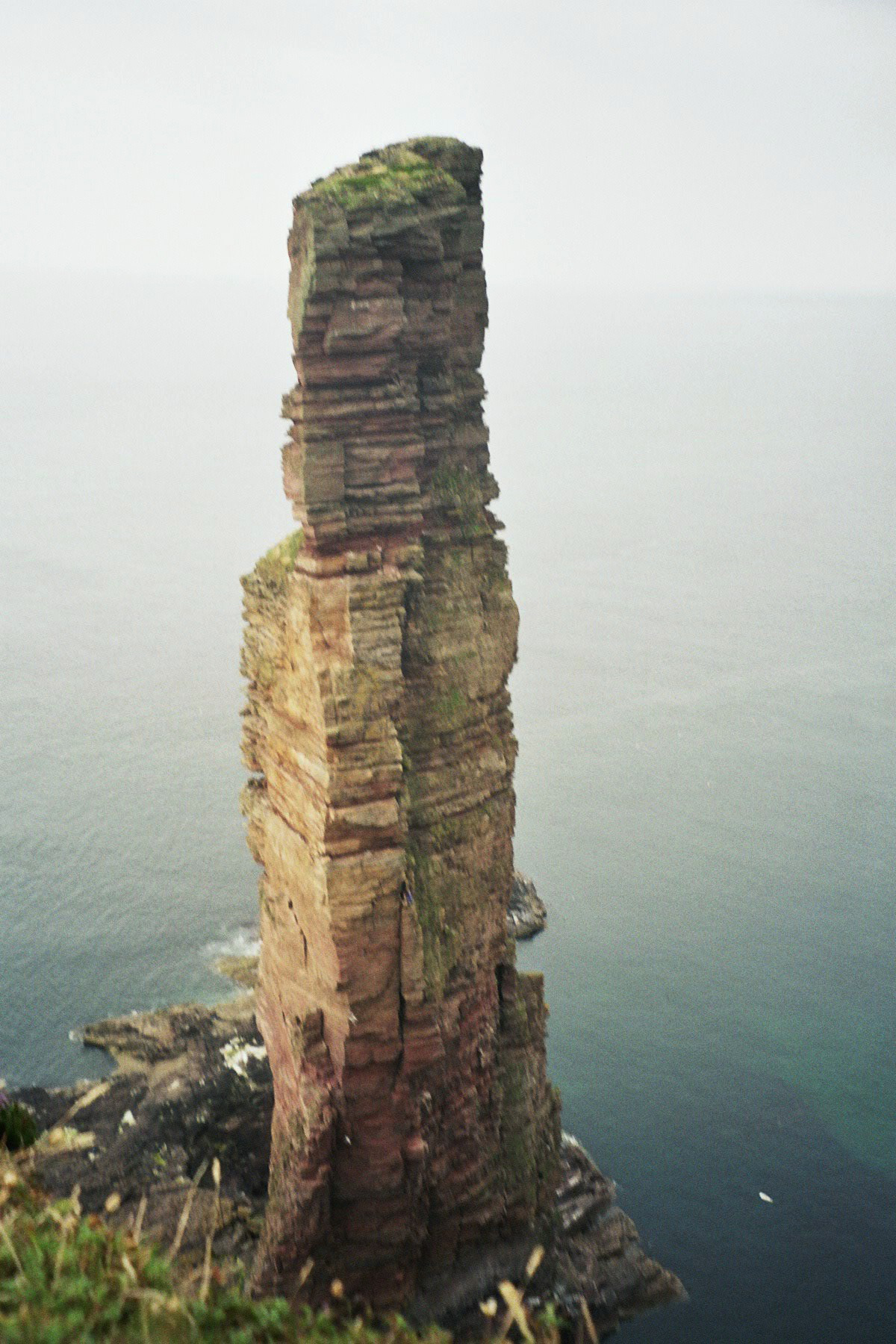
The Old Man of Hoy, 2004

Red Széll became the first blind person to climb the Old Man, despite suffering from retinitis pigmentosa that left him with 5% vision. With assistance from Martin Moran and Nick Carter, he scaled the stack in 2013.

The youngest person to climb the Old Man is Edward Mills, who was 8 years old when he completed the climb in 4 hours 55 minutes on 9 June 2018, to raise money for the charity Climbers Against Cancer as his mother had terminal breast cancer. He was accompanied by his trainers, Ben West and Cailean Harker.

In 2014, Chris Bonington made the ascent again to mark his 80th birthday and to raise funds for research into Motor Neuron Disease, from which his wife Wendy had recently died.

In 2019, Jesse Dufton became the first blind climber to lead an ascent on Old Man of Hoy. The climb was the subject of the 2020 film Climbing Blind.

The youngest female to climb the Old Man of Hoy is Sophia Wood, who was 10 years old when she completed the climb in just over 3 hours in June 2023. She traveled from Newport News, USA to Hoy Scotland UK and completed the climb with her two guides Edmund Hastings and Alex Riley. Sophia used this climb to start a fundraiser to help introduce climbing to kids with the "Boys and Girls Club" in her local area.

Aden Thurlow (born 2013) is a Scottish climber known for becoming the youngest person to lead climb the Old Man of Hoy at the age of 12. He completed the ascent on 24 September 2025, supported by safety climber Jim Miller and second climber Alan Thurlow, as part of a family expedition that also included Lynn Thurlow.

Aden Thurlow is additionally recognised for being the youngest climber to lead all three of Scotland’s major sea stacks for charity —the Old Man of Hoy, the Old Man of Stoer, and Am Buachaille—before the age of 13. His earlier achievements include leading the Old Man of Stoer and Am Buachaille at 11 years old, making him the youngest known lead climber to complete all three routes.

There are seven routes up the stack, the most commonly used of which is the original landward facing East Face Route, graded E1 5b (Extremely Severe). A log book in a Tupperware container is buried in a cairn on the summit, as an ascensionists' record. As many as fifty ascents of the stack are made each year.

=== Highline ===
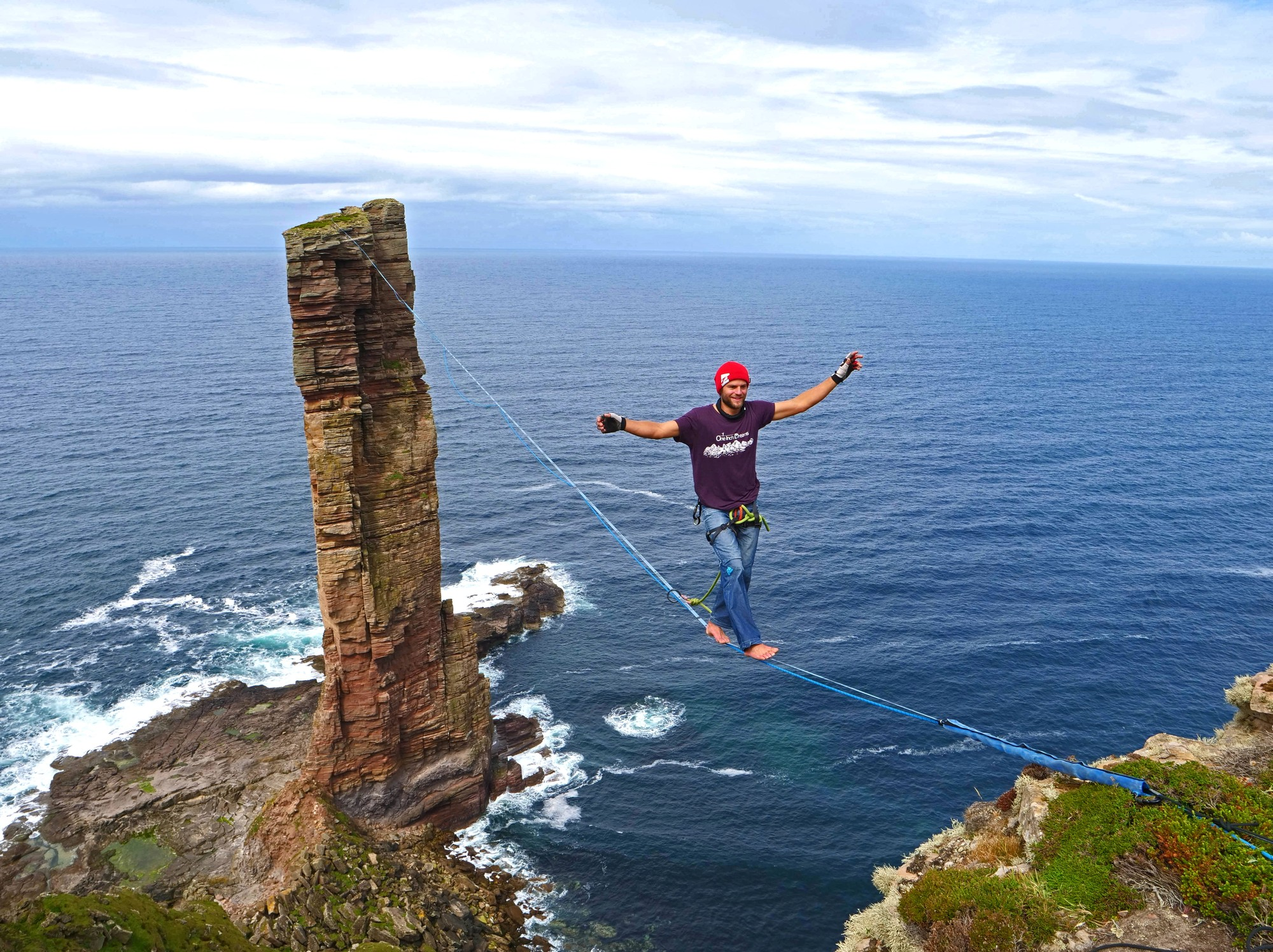
Highline walk of Alex Schulz

On 10 July 2017, Alexander Schulz completed a highline walk to and from the summit, at 137 m (449 ft) above the sea on a line 180 m (200 yd) long.

=== BASE jumping ===
Roger Holmes, Gus Hutchison-Brown, and Tim Emmett made the first BASE jump from the stack on 14 May 2008. Hutchinson-Brown died 11 days later during a jump in Switzerland. On 27 July 2019, two Poles, Filip Kubica and Dominik Grajner repeated BASE jumped from the top.

== See also ==
- List of sea stacks in Scotland
- Clogwyn Du'r Arddu, major British rock climbing venue
