= Emma Farrell (freediver) =

British freediving instructor and author

- Born: 1973 (age 52–53)
- Occupations: Freediving instructor, author
- Notable work: One breath: A Reflection on Freediving

Emma Farrell (born 1973) is a British freediving instructor, and the author of the book One breath: A Reflection on Freediving. She started freediving in 2001 and has been teaching since 2002. She was head of instruction at the UK's DeeperBlue freediving club from 2004 until her resignation in 2009; she now runs her own freediving training company, GoFreediving, which teaches the SSI freediving programme. In 2007, she was stated to be one of only ten freediving instructor trainers in the world. Emma has explained that control over one's own mind and self-relaxation are key to free diving.

== Career ==
She has dived on the BBC2 television series Britain's Secret Seas, and taught Hugh Fearnley-Whittingstall to freedive for UK Channel 4's River Cottage. She has also taught actors Terence Stamp and Jack Osbourne to freedive. In May 2012 she featured as the freediving expert and teacher for UK Channel 4's Hidden Talent show.

Leading up to the 2012 Olympics, she was asked by UK Sports to work with top-level swimmers and cyclists including Keri-Anne Payne, Annie Last, David Carry, Cassie Patten, Michael Rock, and James Goddard. Emma created a unique program of yoga and freediving techniques to improve their breathing, lung function, CO_{2} and lactic acid tolerance, confidence, and performance. After the London games, she was invited to work with the UK Paralympic team in the run-up to the 2016 Rio Olympic Games, where she helped coach Ellie Simmonds, Alice Tai, Susannah Rodgers, Hannah Russell, Stephanie Slater, and others to gold medal glory. She is currently working with gold medal-winning Paralympic athletes in preparation for the 2020 Tokyo Olympic Games.
