= Lairg =

Village in Sutherland, Scotland

Coordinates: 58.02°N 4.40°W

Lairg: Scottish Gaelic: An Luirg
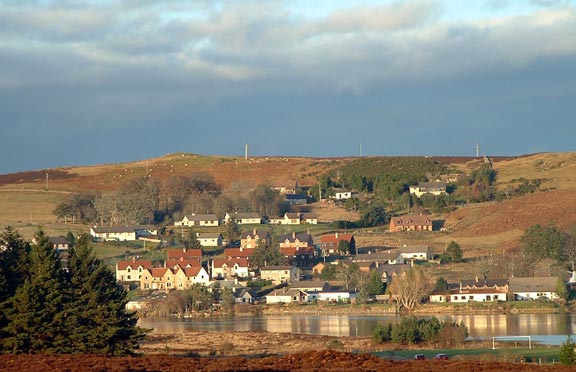
- Lairg

- Location within the Sutherland area
- Population: 891 (2011 census)
- OS grid reference: NC582064
  - Edinburgh: 150 mi (241 km)
  - London: 481 mi (774 km)
- Council area: Highland
- Lieutenancy area: Sutherland
- Country: Scotland
- Sovereign state: United Kingdom
- Post town: LAIRG
- Postcode district: IV27
- Dialling code: 01549
- Police: Scotland
- Fire: Scottish
- Ambulance: Scottish
- UK Parliament: Caithness, Sutherland and Easter Ross
- Scottish Parliament: Caithness, Sutherland and Ross

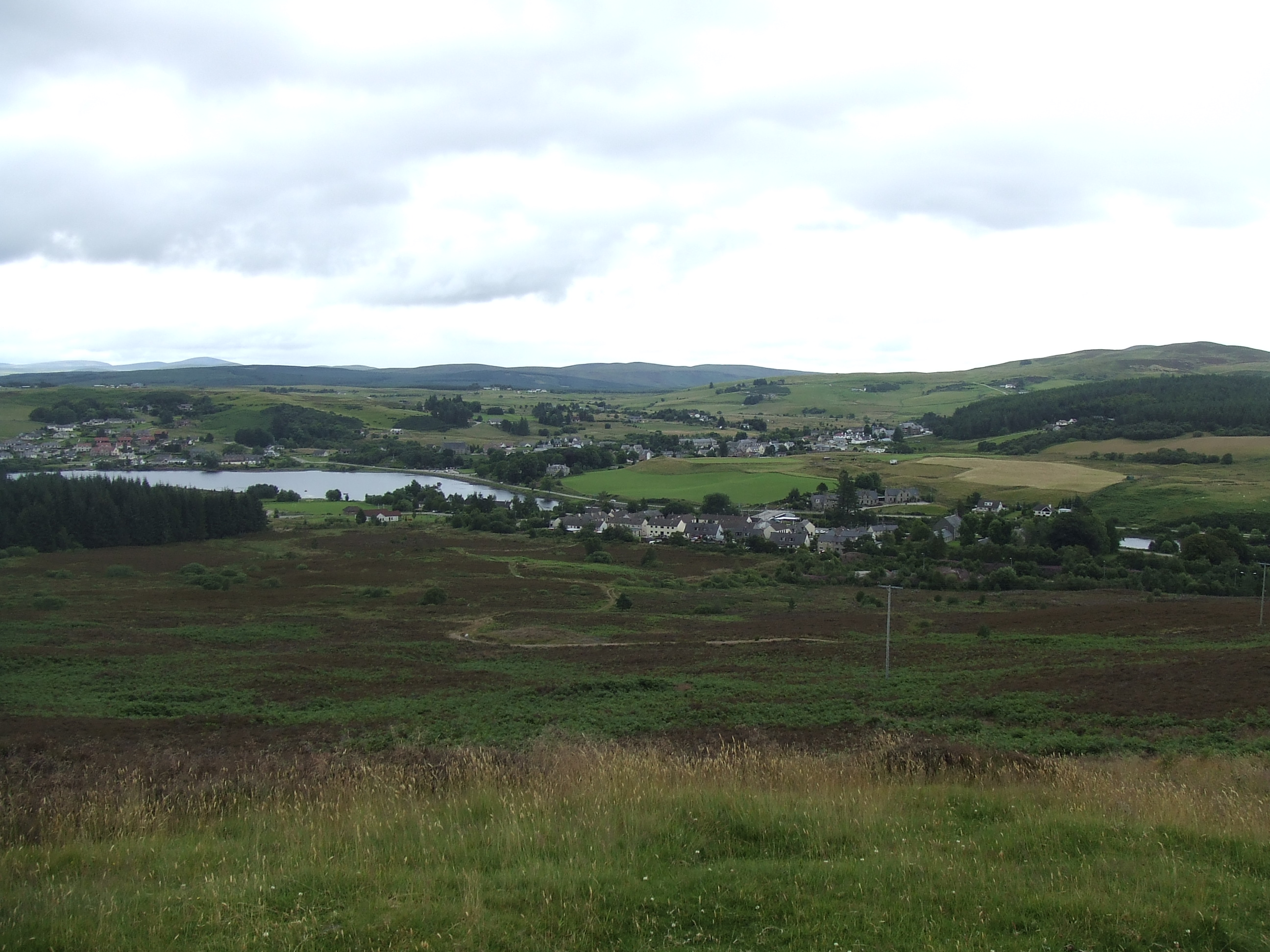
The village of Lairg

Lairg (Scottish Gaelic: An Luirg, meaning "the shank/shin") is a village and parish in Sutherland, Scotland. It has a population of 891 and is at the south-eastern end of Loch Shin.

Lairg is unusual in the northern Highlands in being a large settlement that is not on the coast. One of the reasons that Lairg is slightly bigger than other non-coastal Highland villages is its central location within the county of Sutherland. Having four roads which meet in the village, it used to be known as "The Crossroads of the North". In the 19th century, it was provided with a railway station (at NC582039), on what is now the Far North Line. This development means that the north-west of Sutherland is now easier to reach. (The Far North Line links Inverness in the south with Thurso and Wick in the north.)

== Sheep sales ==
Lairg is the location of the largest single-day sheep sale in Europe. These auctions take place in August and bring people from all over Scotland to buy or sell their animals.

== Gala Week ==
In July, Lairg holds a Gala Week. This is organised by a local committee in order to put on fun activities for adults and children. Events include fancy-dress parades, a pet show, fishing competitions on Loch Shin or the Little Loch Shin, and dances with live music in the community centre.

== Lairg Crofters' Show ==
This one-day event has been running for 100 years. It attracts many spectators and participants for activities such as horse-jumping, sheep and cow judging, children's sports, Highland sports (e.g. tossing the caber, throwing the wellie/haggis) and homemade crafts. Sheep racing has even become a significant attraction in recent years.

== Little Loch Shin ==
Little Loch Shin lies directly in the centre of the village. It is a manmade loch created by the hydroelectric dam scheme, and is the home of the "Broon's hoose", a small, wooden dwelling on an islet. Loch Shin itself lies to the north of Lairg and is 17 miles (27 km) long.

== Facilities ==
Lairg has a petrol station, pub/hotel, post office, bank, caravan site, primary school, tourist information centre, and various shops, cafes and B&Bs. Tourists attractions include the Shin Falls, fishing, sightseeing and hillwalking.

== Transport ==
Lairg railway station lies on the picturesque Far North Line, north of Invershin and west of Rogart. It is managed by ScotRail.

A proposal on the rail routes to the north of Inverness is to create a more direct rail from Inverness to Dornoch via a new bridge and an old branch line, which would leave Lairg isolated on a circuitous loop away from the main route. Although the link would shorten journey times to Thurso and Wick, reducing the rail service to Lairg would be detrimental to the local economy. Given the huge cost of building a rail bridge over the Dornoch Firth and both the Scottish government and the Highland Regional council's lack of enthusiasm for the project, it seems unlikely the proposal will become reality.

The B864 road leads south and passes through the hamlet of Achany. The parallel A836 road also runs south to Bonar Bridge, and passes through the village of Achinduich. The areas to the north and west are sparsely populated and crossed by just three single track roads.

== Impact crater ==
Lairg is prospectively the site of the fifteenth largest impact crater on Earth, the Lairg Gravity Low which dates from 1.2 billion years ago and is 25 miles (40 km) across.

Evidence for a bolide impact centered on Ullapool was published by a combined team of scientists from the University of Oxford and the University of Aberdeen, in March 2008.

== IV27 (Lairg) postcode area ==
IV27, with Lairg as its postal town, is the largest postcode area in the United Kingdom, at 1,393 square miles (3,608 km^{2}). It covers a vast area of far northwest Scotland, including Lochinver, Cape Wrath and Tongue.

== People associated with Lairg ==
- Sam McDonald (1762–1802), soldier and strongman
- Sir James Matheson (1796–1878), entrepreneur
- Alastair Bruce of Crionaich K.stJ OBE VR (born 1960), Fitzalan Pursuivant Extraordinary and historical advisor to film and television productions including Downton Abbey, as well as former Governor of Edinburgh Castle (appointed July 2019).
- Rev John MacKay MacLennan, minister of Lairg Free church 1923 to 1965, Moderator of the General Assembly in 1938

== See also ==
- Land raid
