= Improvised situation comedy =

An improvised situation comedy is a television program in which there is no definite script for the actors and actresses. Rather, the actors/actresses use the process of retroscripting in which there are rough outlines of themes and stories, but the dialogue is up for the actors/actresses to improvise. Because of the improvised fashion, these sitcoms are usually shot by handheld camera in a documentary-type style. Usually these shows have no laugh tracks, predetermined entrances, or punchlines. Such improvised sitcoms include Curb Your Enthusiasm, Home Movies and Reno 911!. In addition to these, there are many scripted shows that will, after getting principal photography, let the actors do a couple of improv takes, and often some of the best jokes that make it on the show will come from these takes. Notable examples of this would be the US version of The Office or Parks and Recreation and the British show The Thick of It.

This method of television production has largely been welcomed by the established academies of the medium. Examples would include Emmy and Golden Globe nominations for a show and the actors involved; as well as strong support from publications and critics.

Due to the amount of improvisation involved with filming, many of the actors or actresses have experience in, or were trained for, stand-up comedy and/or improv comedy troupes.
