= Stoer =

Coordinates: 58.20558°N 5.34147°W

Stoer: Scottish Gaelic: An Stòr
- Location within the Sutherland area
- OS grid reference: NC037289
- Civil parish: Assynt
- Council area: Highland
- Lieutenancy area: Sutherland
- Country: Scotland
- Sovereign state: United Kingdom
- Post town: LAIRG
- Postcode district: IV27
- Dialling code: 01571
- Police: Scotland
- Fire: Scottish
- Ambulance: Scottish

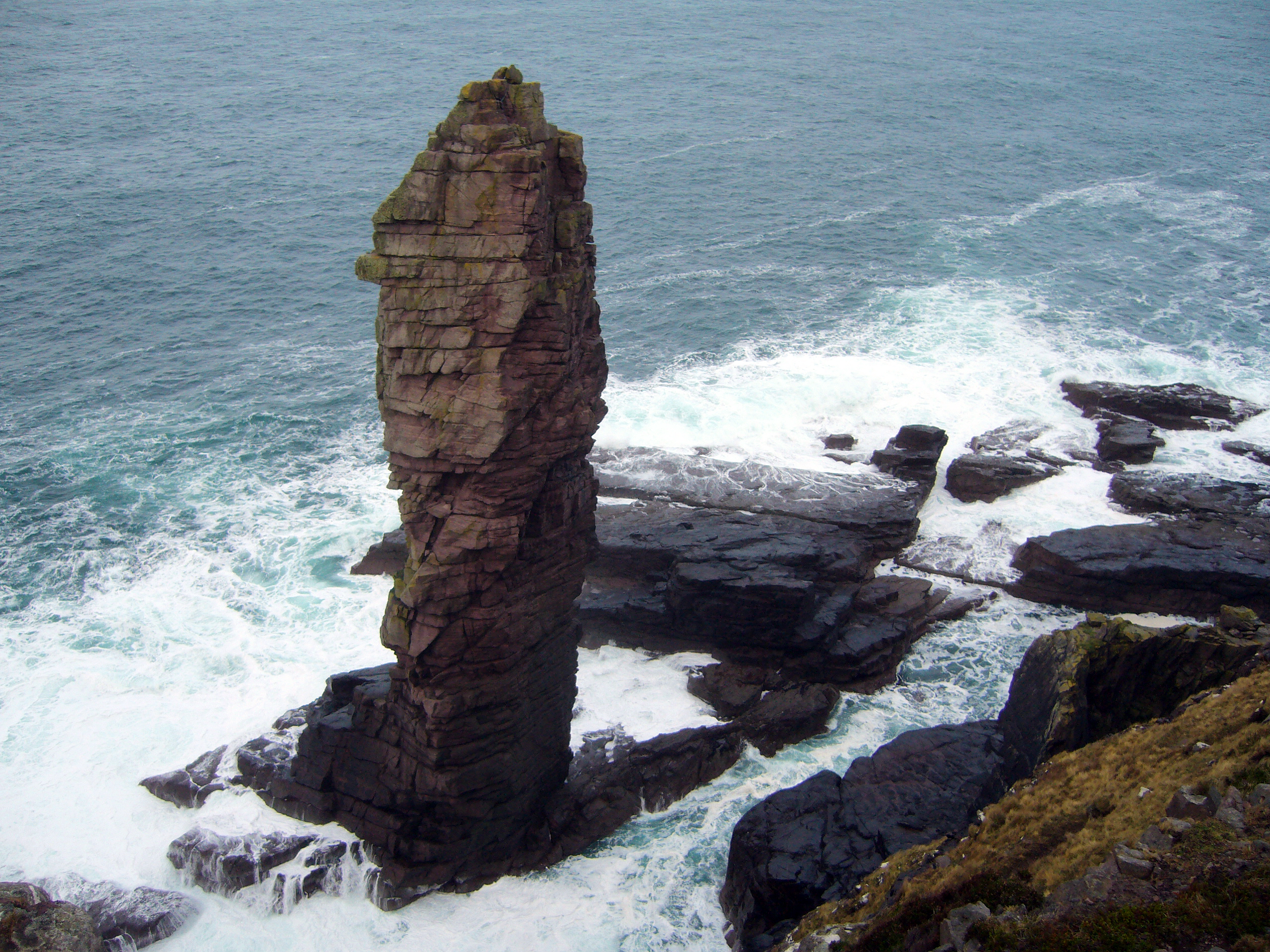
The Old Man of Stoer, a 60-metre (197 feet) high stack of Torridonian sandstone

Stoer (Scottish Gaelic: An Stòr) is a crofting township in the parish of Assynt, Sutherland, in the Highlands of Scotland and in the council area of Highland. It is located about five miles north of the village of Lochinver.

Norman McLeod, a presbyterian minister who led a group of emigrants to Nova Scotia and New Zealand, came from Stoer.

The Old Man of Stoer, a sea stack, and the lighthouse on Stoer Head are directly accessible from Stoer, being less than 4 miles north/north west of the village.

Rev Farquhar Matheson, minister of the parish from 1920, served as Moderator of the General Assembly of the Free Church of Scotland in 1939.

James Macrae was born on 12 October 1871 in Culkeine Auch, Stoer, Assynt, Sutherland to father John Macrae, a crofter, and mother Arabella McKenzie. He moved to Maryhill, Glasgow and became a police constable. He married wife Catherine Graham and their 4th child was John Duncan Graham Macrae, born in 1905, and better known as Duncan Macrae (actor), the famous Scottish actor and comedian.
