= Place names in Ireland =

The vast majority of placenames in Ireland are anglicisations of Irish language names; that is, adaptations of the Irish names to English phonology and spelling. However, some names come directly from the English language, and a handful come from Old Norse and Scots. The study of placenames in Ireland unveils features of the country's history and geography and the development of the Irish language. The name of Ireland itself comes from the Irish name Éire, added to the Germanic word land. In mythology, Éire was an Irish goddess of the land and of sovereignty (see Ériu).

In some cases, the official English or anglicised name is wholly different from the official Irish language name. An example is Dublin: its name is derived from the Irish dubh linn (meaning "black pool"), but its Irish name is Baile Átha Cliath (meaning "town of the hurdled ford").

== Etymology ==
=== Names of Irish Gaelic origin ===
For most of the Gaelic period, there were very few towns or large settlements in Ireland. Hence, most places were named after noteworthy features of the landscape, such as hills, rocks, valleys, lakes, islands, and harbours. As time went on, more places were named after man-made features, such as churches, castles, and bridges. Some of the most common elements found in Irish placenames are shown in the table below. The differences in spelling are often due to differences in pronunciation.

Anglicised spelling	Irish	English translation	Example(s)
agha, aghy, aghey, augha	achadh	field	Aghalee, Aughagower
ard	ard	high, height, hill	Ardcroney, Ardfert, Ardglass
ard, at, ath	áth	ford	Ardsallis, Attymass, Athlone, Athenry, Athy
bal, balli, bally, bel	baile	homestead, settlement	Balbriggan, Ballinagree, Ballycastle, Ballyjamesduff, Ballymoney, Ballymena, Belcarra
balli, ballina, bally, bella, bellana, ballaghna	béal (an) átha (an/na)	ford-mouth (see béal and áth)	Ballinhassig, Ballinasloe, Ballybay, Bellagowan, Bellavary, Bellanagare, Ballaghnatrillick
bally, balla(gh), bella(gh)	bealach	pass, passage	Ballybofey, Ballyclare, Ballaghaderreen, Ballaghmore
bane, bain, baun	bán	white	Strabane, Kinbain, Cregganbaun
beg	beag	small	Bunbeg, Carrickbeg
bel, bell	béal	mouth, rivermouth	Belclare, Belgooly, Belmullet, Belfast, Belturbet
ben, bin	binn, beann	peak	Benbaun, Binevenagh
boher, bar	bóthar	road, path, boreen	Boherbue, Bohernabreena, Bohernaglogh
borris	buiríos	borough, burgage	Borris, Borrisokane, Borrisoleigh
boy, bue	buí	yellow	Bawnboy, Curraghboy, Boherbue
brack	breac	mottled, speckled	Ballybrack, Mullaghbrack
bun	bun	river bottom, foot, mouth	Bunbeg, Buncrana, Bundoran
cashel	caiseal	stone ringfort	Cashel, Cashelore
cappa(gh)	ceapach	plot, tillage	Cappagh, Cappamore, Cappawhite
carn	carn	cairn	Carndonagh, Carnmoney
carrow, carry, carhoo, caherna	ceathrú	quarter	Carrowdore, Carrowteige, Carryduff
carrig, carrick, craig	carraig, creig	rock, rocky outcrop	Carrigaline, Carrick, Carrickfergus, Carrickmacross, Craigarogan
cahir, caher	cathair	stone ringfort	Cahir, Cahircon, Caherdaniel
clare	clár	plateau, (of) level land	Clarecastle, Claremorris, Belclare, Cooraclare
clo(gh), clough	cloch, cloich	rock	Clonakilty, Clogheen, Clogher, Cloughjordan
clon, clone, cloon	cluain	meadow	Clondalkin, Clonmel, Cloondara
coom	com	hollow	Coomkeen
cor	corr	small round hill	Cornafulla, Corblonog
corry, curry	coire	corrie	Rockcorry, Tubbercurry
crogh, croagh	cruach	stack, pile	Croghan, Croaghgorm
cross	cros, crois	cross	Crossbarry, Crossmaglen, Crossmolina
cul, cool	cúl	back, behind	Cultra, Coolafancy, Coolderry
cul, cool, cole	cúil	nook, corner	Culdaff, Coleraine, Coolrain, Cloonacool
der, derry, dor, dore	doire	grove, oak-grove	Derry, Edenderry, Glandore, Kildorrery, Ballaghaderreen
dona(gh)	domhnach	church	Donaghadee, Donabate, Carndonagh
droghed, drohed, drohid	droichead	bridge	Drogheda, Carrigadrohid, Clondrohid
drom, drum, drim	druim, droim	back, ridge	Dromod, Dromore, Drumcondra, Drumshanbo, Drimoleague
dub, duff, duv	dubh	black	Dublin, Claddaghduff, Cloughduv
dun, doon, down, downe	dún	stronghold, fort	Dunboyne, Dungannon, Dungarvan, Doonbeg, Downpatrick, Lansdowne
ennis, inch, innis, innish, inish	inis	island	Ennis, Enniscorthy, Enniskillen, Inch, Inniskeen, Inishcrone
esk, eish	eiscir	esker	Eskra
fer	fear, fir	men	Fermanagh, Fermoy
fin, finn, ven	fionn	clear, white, fair	Finglas, Ballyfin, Ventry
freagh, frack	fraoch	heather	Letterfrack
garv, gorv	garbh	rough	Garvagh, Garvaghey, Gorvagh
gee, gwee	gaoth	estuary	Geesala, Gweedore
glas, glass	glas	stream	Glasnevin, Douglas, Finglas
glen, glan	gleann	valley	Glencullen, Glenties, Glenveagh, Glanmire, Glanworth
gorm	gorm	blue	Galgorm, Ben Gorm
gort	gort	field	Gort, Gorteen, Gortnahoe
illan, illaun, island	oileán	island	Illanmaster, Islandeady
inver, ineer, enner	inbhear, inbhir	river mouth, estuary	Inver, Rossinver, Dromineer
kil, kill	cill	churchyard or graveyard	Kill, Kildare, Kilkenny, Killiney, Kilrush
kil, kill	coill	woodland	Kilbehenny, Kilcogy, Killycollie, Kilmacthomas
kin, ken, con, can, carn	cionn, ceann	head	Kinallen, Kinlough, Kinsale, Kenmare, Conavalla
knock	cnoc	hill	Knockbridge, Knockcloghrim, Knocklyon
lea	liath	grey	Killylea
letter	leitir	hillside	Letterfrack, Letterkenny, Lettermore
lis, liss	lios	earthen ringfort	Liscannor, Lismore, Lisnaskea, Listowel, Lisselton, Lissycasey
lough	loch	lake	Loughgall, Loughrea, Loughshinny
lurgan	lorga(n)	long ridge	Lurgan, Ballynalurgan
maum, maam	mám	mountain pass	Maum, Maam
magh, may, moy, moi(gh)	maigh, machaire	plain	Magherafelt, Maynooth, Mayo, Moycullen
mona, money	móna, monadh	moor, turf, peatland	Cornamona, Ballymoney
mona, money, winga, winna, winny, vinna, vinny, vunnia, bonni, bunny	muine	thicket	Moneygall, Carrowmoney, Kilmoney, Ballywinna, Ballinvinny, Bonniconlon
monaster	mainistir	abbey, monastery	Monasteraden, Monasterevin
more	mór	big, great	Ballymore, Baltimore, Kilmore, Oranmore, Tullamore
mulla(gh), mulh	mullach	summit	Mullagh, Mullaghmore, Mullaghbawn, Mulhuddart
mullin	muileann	mill	Mullinahone, Mullinavat, Mullingar, Bellanamullia
noe	nua	new	Ballynoe, Templenoe
owen	abhainn	river	Owenbeg
poll, poul	poll	hole	Pollagh, Poulaphouca, Poulpeasty
port	port	stronghold, fort	Portlaoise
port	port	port, harbour, landing place	Portadown, Portmarnock
rath, rah	ráth	earthen ringfort	Rathdrum, Rathfarnham, Rathmines, Raheen, Raheny
rea(gh), reva(gh)	riabhach	brindled, speckled	Loughrea, Moneyreagh, Cloonsheerevagh
roe	rua	red	Carraroe, Murroe, Portroe
ros, ross, rosh, rus, rush	ros	wood, wooded promontory	Roscommon, Roscrea, Rush, Kilrush, New Ross, Carrickmacross
sall, salla, sally	sail(each)	willow(s)	Ballysally, Sallins
shan	sean	old	Shanballymore, Shandon, Shankill
sheskin	seascann	marsh, quagmire	Sheskin
ske, skey, skay, skea(gh)	sceach	(thorn) bush, hawthorn	Skehana, Skeheenarinky, Ballyskeagh, Clonskeagh
skreen, skrine, skryne	scrín	shrine	Skreen, Skryne
slieve	sliabh	mountain	Slievenamon, Slieve Donard
sra(gh), srah, stra, strad, strath, straw	srath, sraith	floodplain	Sragh, Stranorlar, Stradone, Strathfoyle, Straw
ta(gh), taugh, te, tee, ti(gh)	teach	house	Taney, Taghadoe, Taghmaconnell, Taughboyne, Templeogue, Timoleague, Tydavnet
temple	teampall	church	Templemore, Templenoe, Ballintemple
ter, tir, tyr	tír	territory	Terenure, Terryglass, Tirconaill, Tyrone
termon	tearmann	refuge, sanctuary	Termon, Termonfeckin
tieve	taobh	hillside	Tievebulliagh
tober, tubber	tobar	water well	Ballintober, Tobermore, Tubberclare, Tubbercurry
tra, try	trá, tráigh	beach, strand	Tragumna, Tralee, Tramore, Ventry
tuam, tom, toom	tuaim	burial mound	Tuam, Tuamgraney, Toomevara
tulla(gh), tully, tullow	tulach	hillock, mound, heap	Tullamore, Tullyallen, Tullyhogue, Tullow
turlough, turlagh	turlach	turlough	Turlough, Turloughmore, Turlaghmore
orlar, urlar, urlaur	urlár	floor, flat land	Stranorlar, Urlar
vea(gh), vei(gh)	bheithe	(of) birch	Ballyveagh, Glenveagh

=== Names of Norse origin ===
During the 800s and 900s, Vikings from Scandinavia raided monasteries along Ireland's coasts and waterways. The Vikings spoke the Old Norse language and are also called Norsemen. They set up small coastal camps called longphorts – these were used as bases for their raiding parties and as shelters during the winter. Eventually, some longphorts grew into Norse settlements and trading ports. The biggest of these were Dublin (which became a Norse-Gaelic kingdom), Wexford, Waterford, Cork and Limerick. Over time, the Norsemen embraced Gaelic language and culture, becoming known as the Norse-Gaels (Gall-Ghaeil in Modern Irish, Gall-Gaidhel in Old Irish).

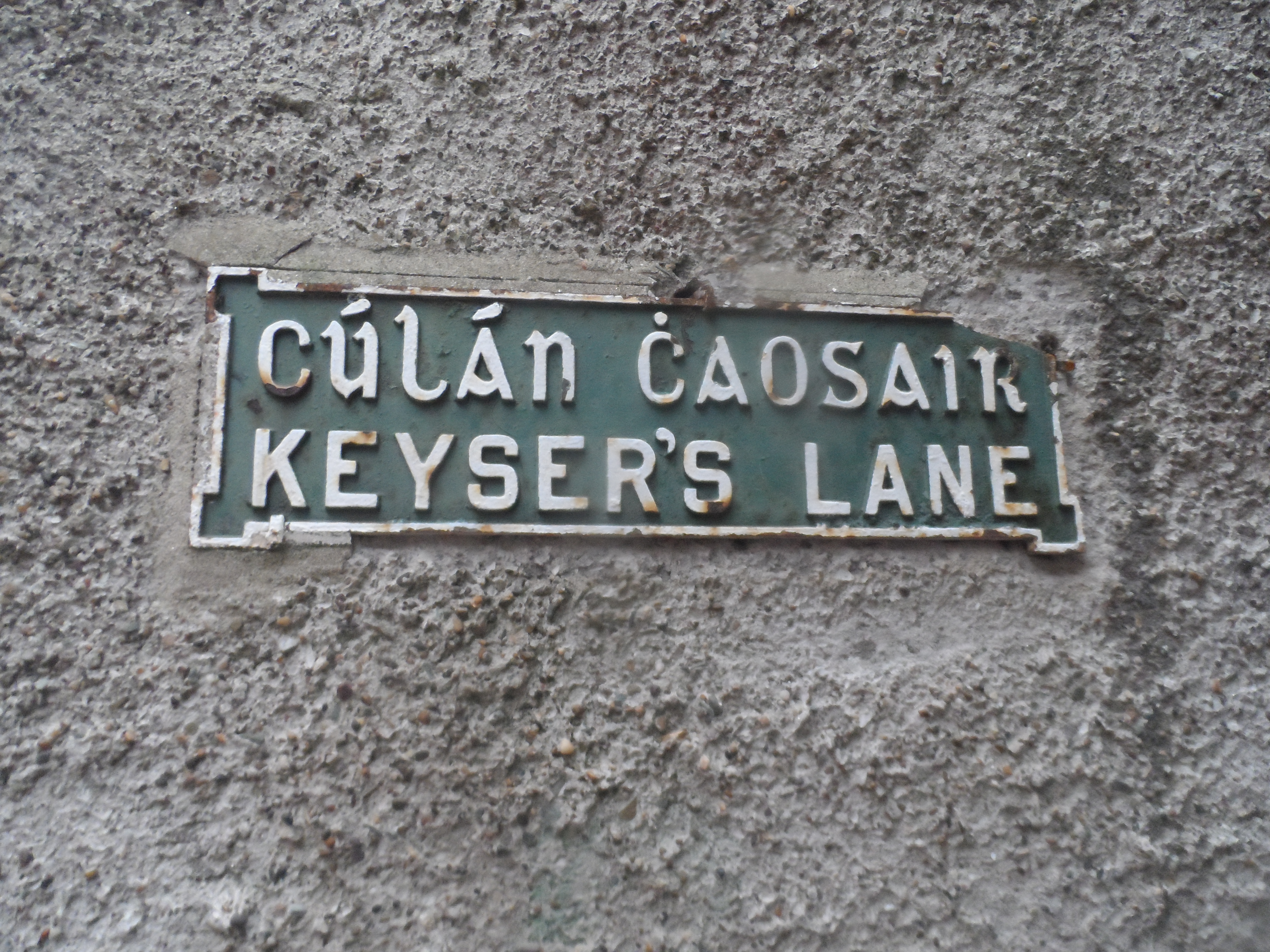
Sign on Keyser's Lane, Wexford

Placenames derived from Old Norse:

English	Old Norse (approximation)	Old Norse translated	Irish (modern)	Notes
Arklow	Arkells-lág	Arkell's low place	an tInbhear Mór	The Irish was historically anglicised as Invermore.
Blasket	Brasker	sharp reef	Blascaod	Unclear origin, first recorded as Brascher, Braschet, Brasquei.
Carlingford	Kerling-fjǫrðr	old woman fjord	Cairlinn	
Copeland Islands	Kaupmanneyjar	merchants' island	Oileáin Chóplainn	The Norse name appears in Hákonar saga Hákonarsonar (1230). Later influenced by the Norman surname de Coupland, Copeland.
Dalkey	—	—	Deilginis	The name is a meld of deilg (Irish) + ey (Norse).
Dursey	Þjórrs-ey	bull island	Baoi Bhéarra or Oileán Baoi	
Fastnet	Hvasstǫnn-ey	sharp-tooth island	Carraig Aonair	—
Fota	Fódr-øy	Foot island	Fóite	Uncertain etymology, possible means "foot" as it is at the mouth of the River Lee.
Haulbowline	Ál-boling	eel dwelling	Inis Sionnach	—
Helvick	Hellavik, Helgavík	bright bay, healthy bay, safe bay, holy bay	Heilbhic	The Irish is a Gaelicisation of the Old Norse. Hellvik, Norway probably has the same root.
Howth	Hǫfuð	head	Binn Éadair	—
Ireland's Eye	Ireland's øy	Ireland's island	Inis Mac Neasáin	Originally called Eria's Island; this was later confused and it became "Erin's Island"; the Norse word øy ("island") was added, and this was later confused with English "eye."
Keyser's Lane	keisa?	bend	Cúlán Chaosair	Street name found in Drogheda, Dublin, Waterford, Wexford and Cork. Believed to derive from Old Norse, perhaps keisa ("bend") or keisari ("emperor"). Other sources give "ship wharf."
Lambay	Lamb-ey	lamb island	Reachrainn	—
Leixlip	Lax Hlaup	salmon leap	Léim an Bhradáin	The Irish is a translation of the Old Norse. The English is an Anglicisation of the Old Norse.
Oxmantown	-	-	Baile Lochlannach	Scandinavian homestead.
Saltee	Salt-ey	salt island	Na Sailtí	The Irish is a Gaelicisation of the Old Norse. The English is an Anglicisation of the Old Norse.
Selskar	Selr-skar	seal skerry	Seilsceir	
Smerwick	Smjǫr-vík	butter bay	Ard na Caithne	
Strangford	Strangr-fjǫrðr	strict or narrow fjord	Loch Cuan	—
Skerries	Skeri	skerries	Na Sceirí	The Irish is a Gaelicisation of the Old Norse. The English is an Anglicisation of the Old Norse.
The Skerries	Skeri	skerries	Na Sceirí	Located in County Antrim.
Tuskar	Þurs-sker	giant rock	An Tuscar	—
Waterford	Veðra-fjǫrðr	ram or wether fjord	Port Láirge	The English name is a folk etymology.
Wexford	Veisa-fjǫrðr	muddy fjord	Loch Garman	The Irish was historically anglicised as Loughgarman.
Whiddy	Hvít-øy	white island	Faoide	Uncertain etymology.
Wicklow	Víkinga-lág	Vikings' low place	Cill Mhantáin	The Irish was historically anglicised as Kilmantan.

=== Names of English origin ===
After the Norman invasion of Ireland, which began in 1169, Anglo-Norman and English language placenames emerged in the areas under Anglo-Norman control. Most of these are within the bounds of "The Pale" – the area that stayed under direct English control for the longest, and where English language and culture held sway. It stretched along the east coast from Dundalk in the north to Dalkey in the south.

Between 1556 and 1641, during its "conquest of Ireland", the English colonised parts of the country with settlers from Great Britain. This is known as the "Plantations of Ireland". After the 1601 Battle of Kinsale defeat in which the Gaelic aristocracy fled to continental Europe the northern province of Ulster was the most heavily colonised. Those who settled as part of the "Plantation of Ulster" were required to be English speaking made up mostly of Lowland Scots and some northern English. The result is that northeast Ulster also has a great number of English-derived placenames.

Such placenames often refer to buildings and other manmade features. They often include forms such as -town, -ton, -ville, -borough, -bury, bridge, mill, castle, abbey, church, etc. However, forms such as hill, mount, mont, wood, bay, brook etc. are not uncommon.

Some placenames that seem to come from English are in fact anglicized Irish names modified by folk etymology. Examples include Longford (from Irish an Longphort 'the dock'), Upperland (from Áth an Phoirt Leathain meaning "ford of the broad (river) bank"), Golden (from gabhailín meaning "little river fork") and Forkhill (from Foirceal meaning "trough").

=== Names of Scots origin ===
The Lowland Scots who settled during the Plantation of Ulster also contributed to place-names in the north of Ireland, particularly in the Ulster Scots areas. The Scots influence can be seen in places such as Burnside (stream), Calheme from 'Cauldhame' (coldhome), Corby Knowe (raven knoll) Glarryford from 'glaurie' (muddy), Gowks Hill (cuckoo) and Loanends (where the lanes end) in County Antrim, Crawtree (crow), Whaup Island (curlew) and Whinny Hill from 'whin' (gorse) in County Down and the frequent elements burn (stream), brae (incline), dyke (a stone or turf wall), gate (a way or path), knowe (knoll), moss (moorland), sheuch or sheugh (a trench or ditch) and vennel (narrow alley). Other Scots elements may be obscured due to their being rendered in Standard English orthography.

=== Names of other origins ===
Some places in Ireland bear names from beyond Gaelic, Norse or English.

One reason for this is because foreign names can be perceived as more fashionable than native ones. Particularly in middle-class areas, names of Italian origin have been used because of this perception and many roads (e.g. Vico Road and Sorrento Road in Dalkey) and housing estates have obtained their names in this way. More rarely, this has led to the naming of whole suburbs (e.g. Montenotte and Tivoli in Cork). Portobello, Dublin was named in celebration of the British victory at the 1739 Battle of Porto Bello.

Another source of place names is from Anglo-Norman. Considering the number of surnames of Norman origin in Ireland, these are surprisingly rare. Nevertheless, some examples do exist, such as the town of Buttevant (from the motto of the Barry family – Boutez en Avant) and the village of Brittas (from the Norman-French Bretesche, "boarding, planking"). Others exist in portmanteau with words of Irish or English origin, such as Castletownroche, which combines the English Castletown and the French Roche, meaning rock. Most widespread is the term Pallas (from Norman paleis, "boundary fence") which appears in over 20 place names, including the towns Pallasgreen and Pallaskenry. Reeves Castle and the townland of Reeves near Celbridge take their name from Anglo-Norman rive, meaning "riverbank."

A further source of place names of other origin is places names after religious sites outside Ireland. Examples are Lourdes Road in Dublin and Pic du Jer Park in Cork.

The baronies of North Salt and South Salt are derived from Saltus Salmonis, a Latin calque of the town name of Leixlip (from Norse Lax Hlaup, "salmon leap").

Some linguists, including Theo Vennemann, have proposed that the ancient name for Ireland Ivernia or Hibernia is derived from proto-Semitic *'i: weriju ("island of copper").

== Republic of Ireland ==
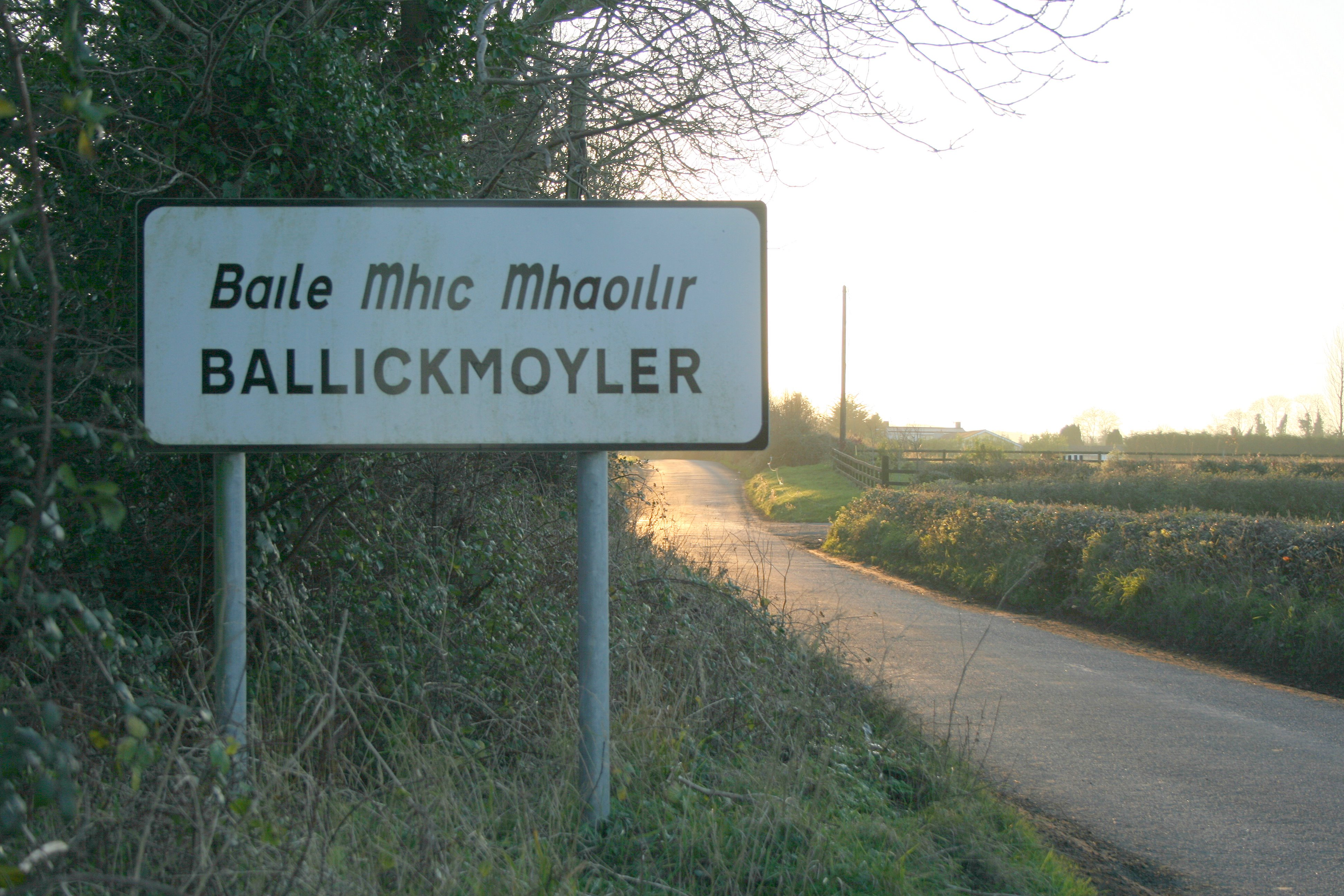
Welcome sign at Ballickmoyler, County Laois – the letter i is written dotless as it is in Gaelic script

In the Republic of Ireland, both Irish and English names have equal status and are displayed on road signs, though the Irish is in smaller, italicised font, while the English is in all upper case. However, in the Gaeltacht, the English/anglicized names have no official status and do not appear on road signs.

During and after the foundation of the Irish Free State in 1922, some English names were returned to their Irish form. In most cases, the Irish Gaelic name became the only official one (for example Kingstown became Dún Laoghaire in both languages). In other cases, the English name was changed for another (for example King's County became County Offaly, which comes from the Irish Uíbh Fhailí). Although most of the changes were accepted by the wider public, some did not catch on and were eventually undone. The Local Government Act 1946 allowed locals to petition for a name change.

The following places were officially renamed:

- Bagenalstown → Muine Bheag (1932)
- Charleville → Ráth Luirc (1920s) → Charleville (1989)
- County Donegal → County Tirconaill (1922) → County Donegal (1927)
- Edgeworthstown → Mostrim (1935) → Edgeworthstown (1974)
- Frankford → Kilcormac (1903)
- Kells → Ceannanus Mór (1929) → Kells (1993)
- King's County → County Offaly (1922)
- Kingstown → Dún Laoghaire (1922)
- Kingwilliamstown → Ballydesmond (1951)
- Maryborough → Portlaoise (1929)
- Navan → An Uaimh (1922) → Navan (1971)
- Newbridge → Droichead Nua (1930s)
- Newtownbarry → Bunclody (1950)
- Newtownsandes → Moyvane (1939)
- Parsonstown → Birr (1890s)
- Philipstown → Daingean (1922)
- Queen's County → County Laois (1922)
- Queenstown → Cobh (1922)

Pursuant to the Official Languages Act 2003 and the advice of the Coimisiún Logainmneacha (Place-Names Commission), the Placenames (Centres of Population and Districts) Order 2005 was issued, listing the equivalent in the Irish language of place-names specified in the Order with its English form. The Irish words then had the same meaning and same force and effect as the place-name. This order lists a little fewer than 2,000 place-names, many of which were changed from the Irish form used since independence, e.g. Bray went from Brí Chualann to Bré and Naas changed from Nás na Rí to An Nás.

Beyond the Gaeltacht, only English placenames were officially recognised (pre-2004). But further placenames orders have been passed to enable both the English and Irish placenames to be used. An example of present inconsistency is the village of Straffan, designated variously as An Srafáin, An Cluainíní and Teach Strafáin. In the 1830s John O'Donovan listed it as "Srufáin". The nearby village of Kilteel was "Cill tSíle" for centuries, meaning "The church of Saint Síle", but since 2000 it has been shown as "Cill Chéile", which does not carry the same meaning.

Vehicle registration plates of the Republic of Ireland are bilingual: the county of registration is shown in Irish above the plate number as a kind of surtitle, and is encoded from English within the plate number. For example, a Dublin plate is subtitled Baile Átha Cliath and the plate number includes D.

== Northern Ireland ==
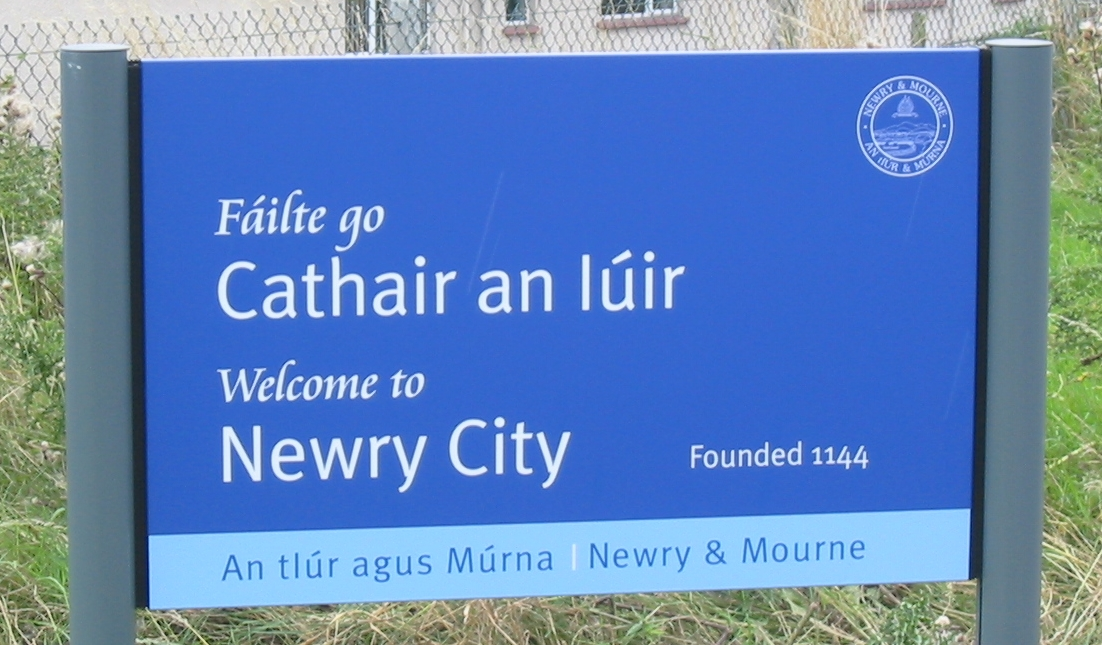
Welcome sign at Newry – in Modern Irish the primary meaning of cathair is "city"

In Northern Ireland, the new recognition of the status of the Irish language does not extend to bilingual roadsigns – it is down to individual district councils to decide to place them. Some towns in Fermanagh and Omagh, Derry City and Strabane, Armagh City, Banbridge and Craigavon, Moyle, Magherafelt, Newry, Mourne and Down and Cookstown council areas display bilingual names on some welcome signs (e.g. "OMAGH" An Ómaigh).

Irish-language street signs may be erected at the request of locals, provided there is enough support.

== Names of provinces ==
There are four provinces in Ireland, three of which derive their English name from a mixture of their ancient Irish provincial name with the Old Norse term for land/territory/place; staðr.

- Connacht, sometimes anglicised as Connaught, is derived from the Connachta dynasty, which means "the descendants of Conn". In modern Irish it is called Connachta or Cúige Chonnacht.
- Munster, derived from Irish: Mumhan + Old Norse staðr, meaning "land of Mumha". In modern Irish it is called an Mhumhain or Cúige Mumhan.
- Leinster, derived from Irish: Laighin + Old Norse staðr, meaning "land of the Laighin". In modern Irish it is called Laighin or Cúige Laighean.
- Ulster, derived from Irish: Ulaidh + Old Norse staðr, meaning "land of the Ulaidh". In modern Irish it is called Ulaidh or Cúige Uladh.

In Irish the provinces are known as cúigí, the singular of which is cúige. The word cúige originally meant "a fifth", as in one-fifth part of Ireland. This is because Meath, as seat of the High King of Ireland, was once a province in its own right, incorporating modern counties Meath, Westmeath and parts of surrounding counties. Meath was later absorbed into Leinster.

== Names of counties ==
In Irish, the counties are known as contaetha, the singular of which is contae. Irish versions of county names only have official status in the Republic of Ireland.

Most of the counties were named after a town in that county (commonly referred to as a county town); usually an administrative centre. Some of these towns, such as Louth, have declined into small villages or have lost their county town status to other towns.

Counties named after their present or former county towns: Antrim, Armagh, Carlow, Cavan, Clare, Cork, Donegal, Down, Dublin, Galway, Kildare, Kilkenny, Leitrim, Limerick, Longford, Louth, Mayo, Monaghan, Roscommon, Sligo, Tipperary, Waterford, Wexford, and Wicklow. The county of Londonderry is named after the city of the same name, though its county town was Coleraine until 1972 when counties were abolished as administrative units in Northern Ireland and replaced with unitary councils.

Some counties derive their names from ancient Irish túatha, kingdoms or people:

- Fermanagh, which is derived from Fear Manach meaning "men of Manach".
- Kerry, which is derived from Ciarraí, which is itself derived from Ciarraighe, meaning "people of Ciar".
- Laois, which is derived from Loígis, the name of a túath.
- Meath, which is derived from Mide, the name of a former province.
- Offaly, which is derived from Uí Failghe, the name of a túath.
- Tyrone, which is derived from Tír Eógain meaning "Eógan's land".
- Westmeath, which was formerly part of Meath until 1542, is likewise derived from Mide.

Some counties derive their names from geographic descriptions

In 1994, County Dublin was abolished as an administrative unit and replaced with three new administrative counties:

- Dún Laoghaire–Rathdown, which is named after the town of Dún Laoghaire (meaning "Laoghaire's stronghold"); and the former barony of Rathdown (Ráth an Dúin in Irish, meaning "ringfort of the stronghold").
- Fingal, which is derived from the Irish Fine Gall, meaning "foreign tribe", referring to the Norse who invaded and settled the area.
- South Dublin, which is named after Dublin.

== Names of streets and roads ==
Many streets and roads in Ireland derive their name from that of the townland, settlement or parish it goes through or heads towards, many of which are of Irish origin. Other streets and roads derive their names from local buildings, manufacturies or people etc.

In Irish, a street is sráid, a road is bóthar (meaning "cow path"), a lane is lána, and an avenue is ascaill. A linear village is called a sráidbhaile ("[one]-street settlement")—this has been anglicised as Stradbally, which is the name of a number of villages on the island. Whilst Irish forms only have official status in the Republic of Ireland, Northern Ireland district councils are allowed to erect bilingual roadsigns.

Origins of some streets and roads in Belfast, Northern Ireland

- Antrim Road, takes its name from the settlement it leads to, Antrim town.
- Ballymurphy Road, derives its name from the townland of Ballymurphy, which itself is derived from the Irish: Baile O Muircháin, meaning "homestead of O'Murphy".
- Crumlin Road takes its name from the settlement the road leads to, Crumlin.
- Donegall Square and Donegall Pass, both named after Lord Donegall, who opened six wide avenues also known as passes.
- Falls Road was originally called the Pound, however, it derives its present name from an older Irish name Tuath-na-bhfal, meaning "district of the falls" or "hedges".
- Hercules Street is named after Sir Hercules Langford.
- Mountpottinger and Pottinger's Lane both derive from the famous Pottinger family.
- Mustard Street is named after a mustard works.
- Old Forge and New Forge both derive their names from forges for smelting iron.
- Shankill Road derives its name from Irish: Seanchill meaning "old church", which is also the name of the local parish.

Origins of some streets and roads in Dublin, Republic of Ireland

- O'Connell Street, formerly known as Sackville Street, it was renamed after Daniel O'Connell. Its Irish name is Sráid Uí Chonaill.
- Grafton Street, developed by the Dawson family, it is named after the Earls of Grafton who owned land in the area. Its Irish name is Sráid Grafton.
- Pearse Street, originally called Moss Lane, then Great Brunswick Street, it was renamed after Pádraig Pearse. Its Irish name is Sráid an Phiarsaigh
- St. James's Street takes its name from a Holy Well in the vicinity, dedicated to St James.

== See also ==
- Celtic onomastics
- Celtic toponymy
- Irish name
- List of towns and villages in the Republic of Ireland (includes cities, towns and villages only)
- List of places in Northern Ireland (includes cities, towns and villages only)
- List of longest placenames in Ireland
- List of Irish place names in other countries
- List of Irish exonyms
- Scottish toponymy
- Welsh toponymy

=== Geographical toponymy ===
- Place names in Ireland
  - Éire
- Ireland
- List of islands of Ireland
- List of loughs of Ireland
- List of rivers of Ireland
- Lists of mountains in Ireland

=== Political toponymy ===
- Names of the Irish state
  - Republic of Ireland
- Northern Ireland
- Provinces of Ireland
  - Ulster
- Counties of Ireland
