= Séamus McElwain =

Member of the IRA

- Séamus McElwain mug shot (1983)
- Born: 1 April 1960; County Monaghan, Republic of Ireland
- Died: 26 April 1986 (aged 26); Roslea, County Fermanagh Northern Ireland
- Military career
- Allegiance: Irish Republic
- Paramilitaries: Provisional IRA (1976–1986); Fianna Éireann (1974–1976)
- Rank: Officer commanding (1979–1986); Volunteer (1976–1979)
- Unit: South Fermanagh Brigade
- Known for: Maze Prison escape
- Conflicts: The Troubles

Séamus Turlough McElwain (1 April 1960 – 26 April 1986) was a volunteer in the South Fermanagh Brigade of the Provisional Irish Republican Army (IRA) during The Troubles, who was killed by British special forces while preparing to ambush an army patrol.

== Early life ==
McElwain was the oldest of eight children and was born and grew up in the townland of Knockacullion, beside the hamlet and townland of Knockatallon, near the village of Scotstown in the north-west of County Monaghan in the Republic of Ireland.

McElwain took his first steps towards becoming involved in physical force republicanism when he joined Na Fianna Éireann aged 14. At the age of 16, McElwain turned down an opportunity to study in the United States and joined the IRA, stating "no one will ever be able to accuse me of running away".

== Paramilitary activities ==
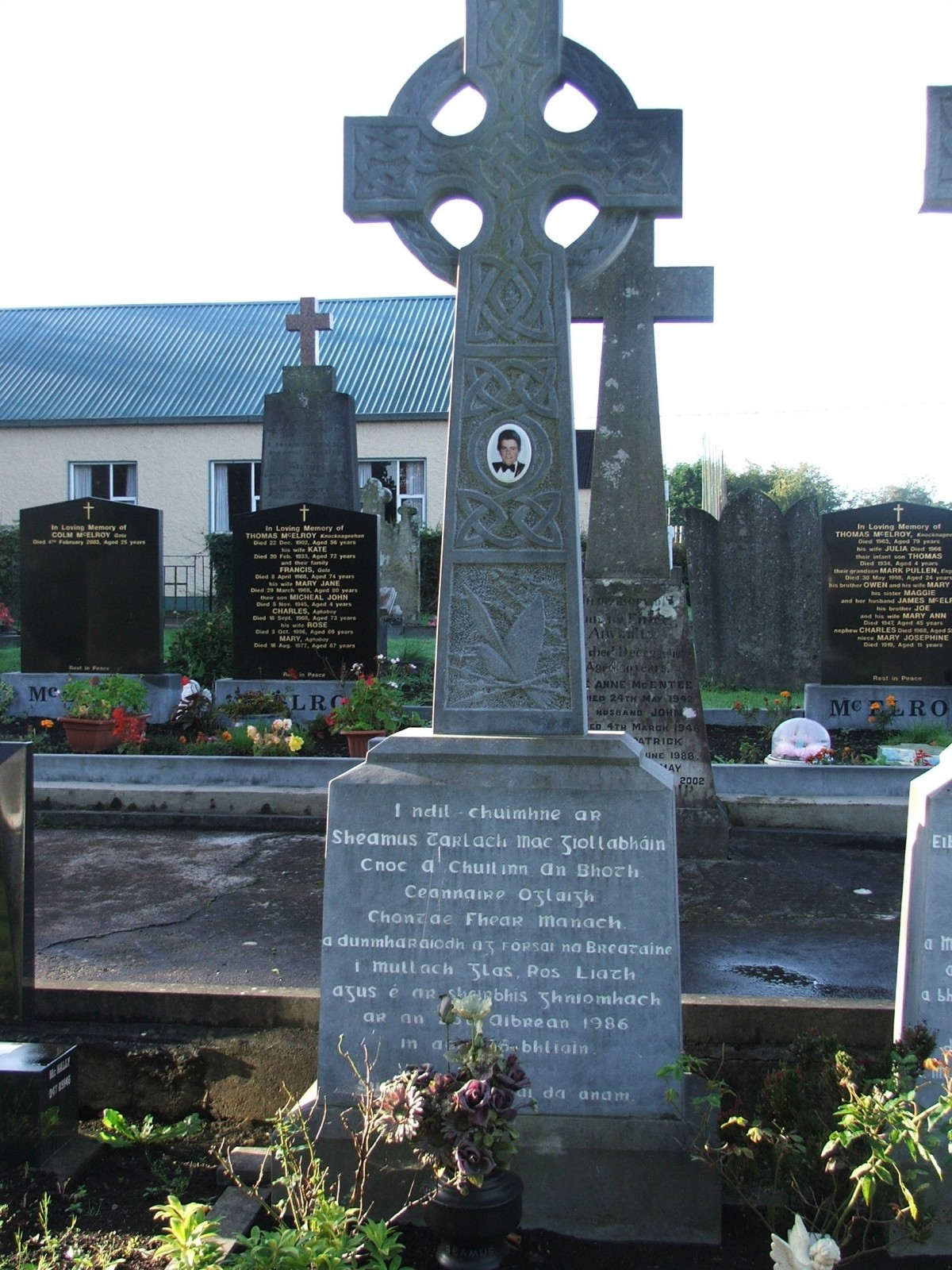
Gravestone of Séamus McElwain

McElwain was an active member of the IRA, who became Officer Commanding of the IRA in County Fermanagh by the age of 19. On 5 February 1980, McElwain killed off-duty Ulster Defence Regiment (UDR) corporal Aubrey Abercrombie as he drove a tractor in the townland of Drumacabranagher, near Florencecourt. Later that year, on 23 September, McElwain killed off-duty Royal Ulster Constabulary (RUC) Reserve Constable Ernest Johnston outside his home in Roslea. McElwain was suspected of involvement in at least 10 other killings including the attempted murder of RUC officer John Kelly, who was the father of future Democratic Unionist Party politician Arlene Foster, at their farm near Aghadrumsee in 1979.

On 14 March 1981, a detachment of the British Army surrounded a farmhouse near Roslea, containing McElwain and three other IRA members. Despite being armed with four rifles, including an Armalite, the IRA members surrendered and were arrested. While on remand in Crumlin Road Gaol, McElwain stood in the February 1982 Irish general election as an independent candidate for Cavan–Monaghan and received 3,974 votes (6.84% of the vote). In May 1982 McElwain was convicted of murdering the RUC and UDR members, with the judge describing him as a "dangerous killer" and recommending he spend at least 30 years in prison.

On 25 September 1983, McElwain was involved in the Maze Prison escape, the largest break-out of prisoners in Europe since World War II and in British prison history. Thirty-eight republican prisoners, armed with 6 handguns, hijacked a prison meals lorry and smashed their way out of the Maze prison.

After the escape, he joined an IRA active service unit operating in the area of the border between Counties Monaghan and Fermanagh. The unit targeted police and military patrols with gun and bomb attacks, while sleeping rough in barns and outhouses to avoid capture.

== Death ==
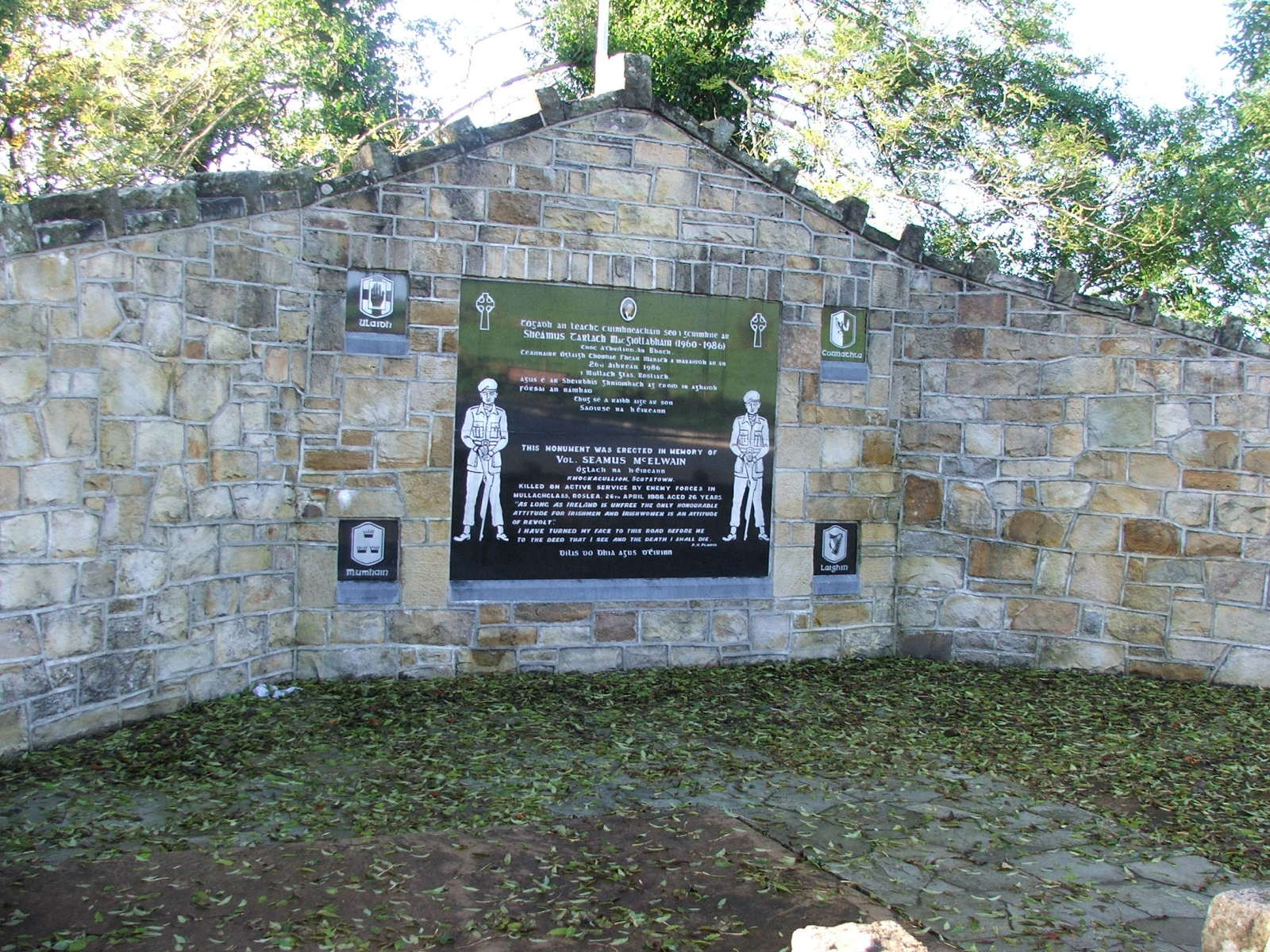
Monument in Corlat, Knockatallon, erected in memory of Séamus McElwaine

In April 1986, a British Army patrol near Roslea in the south-east of County Fermanagh discovered an improvised land mine attached to a command wire in a hedgerow and reported the discovery to their superior officers. A detachment from the Special Air Service Regiment was ordered to establish a covert observation post nearby and keep the improvised explosive device under surveillance.

At approximately 5am on the morning of 26 April 1986, McElwain and another IRA member, Seán Lynch from near Lisnaskea, approached the scene and were ambushed by the hidden SAS soldiers. Both were severely wounded; McElwain was questioned then shot dead while incapacitated, while Lynch managed to escape the initial ambush before being arrested the following morning in a search by the British Army and RUC.

McElwain was buried in Scotstown, County Monaghan, his funeral was attended by an estimated 3,000 people, including Gerry Adams and Martin McGuinness; the latter gave an oration describing McElwain as "a brave intelligent soldier, a young man who gave up his youth to fight for the freedom of his country" and "an Irish freedom fighter murdered by British terrorists". A uniformed IRA guard of honour flanked the coffin as it arrived at Scotstown Parish Church, with three IRA members eventually firing a volley of shots over his coffin.

== Aftermath ==
In 1987, McElwain's father, Jimmy, a longtime member of Monaghan County Council, became the chairman of the Séamus McElwain Cumann of Republican Sinn Féin.

On 1 April 1990, a monument to McElwain was erected in Corlat, a townland beside Knockatallon in the north-west of County Monaghan. The oration was given by a Catholic priest, Father Piaras Ó Dúill, who compared McElwain to Nelson Mandela, saying they both had the same attitude to oppression and both refused to denounce principle. The inscription on the monument is a quote from Patrick Pearse; "As long as Ireland is unfree the only honourable attitude for Irishmen and Irishwomen is an attitude of revolt". A monument to McElwain and six other republicans was erected in Roslea in 1998, and unveiled by veteran republican Joe Cahill.

In January 1993, an inquest jury returned a verdict that McElwain had been unlawfully killed. The jury ruled the soldiers had opened fire without giving him a chance to surrender, and that he was shot dead five minutes after being wounded. The Director of Public Prosecutions requested a full report on the inquest from the RUC, but no one has been prosecuted for McElwain's death.

In April 2006, approximately 1,000 people in Roslea paid tribute to McElwain during the traditional Easter Commemoration to mark the 90th anniversary of the Easter Rising. Victims groups and unionist politicians, including Democratic Unionist Party member Arlene Foster, had asked the Parades Commission to ban the parade from the area where McElwain was killed, describing him as an "evil murderer", but the Commission ruled the commemoration could proceed without any restriction. In Corlat, two weeks later, some 500 people attended the launch of a documentary film about McElwain, Life and death of an IRA activist, marking the 20th anniversary of his death.
