= R674 road (Ireland) =

Regional road in County Waterford, Ireland

Coordinates: 52°02′55″N 7°36′20″W

R674 road
- Bóthar R674
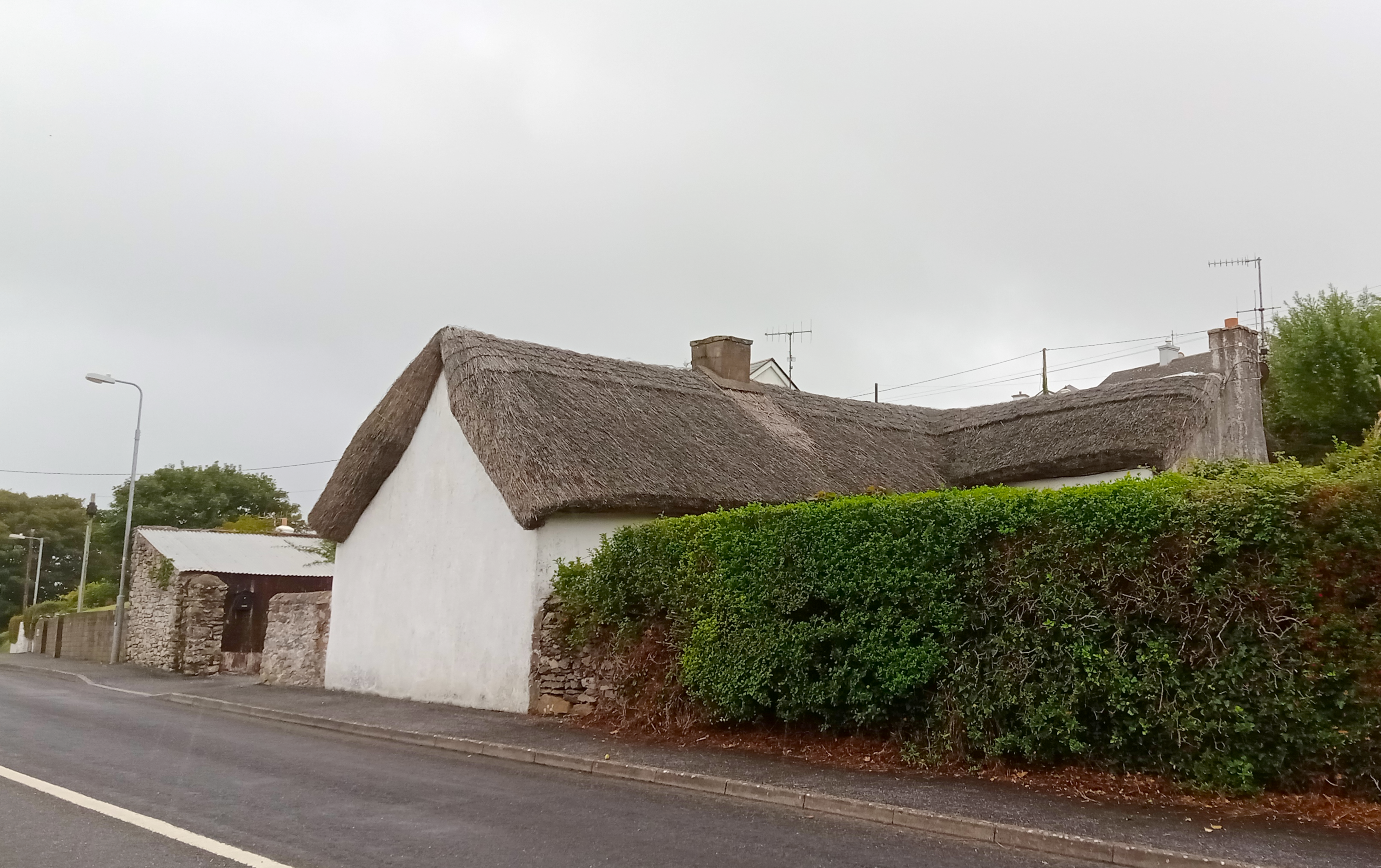
- R674 passing thatched cottage at Helvick

Route information
- Length: 8.7 km (5.4 mi)

Major junctions
- From: N25 at Killongford
- To: Helvick Head

Location
- Country: Ireland

Highway system
- Roads in Ireland; Motorways; Primary; Secondary; Regional
← R673	→ R675

The R674 road is a regional road in County Waterford, Ireland. It runs from the N25 near Dungarvan eastwards through Ring and ending at Helvick Head.
