= Killymarron =

Townland in County Monaghan, Ireland

Coordinates: 54.277°N 7.025°W

Killymarron or Killymarran (Irish: Coill Uí Mhearáin, meaning 'Ó Mearáin's wood') is a very small rural townland situated between Tydavnet and Ballinode villages in County Monaghan, Ireland. It is 0.3 square kilometres (0.12 mi^{2}) in area, and had a population of 26 people as of the 2011 census.
