= Scotstown =

Village in County Monaghan, Ireland

Scotstown An Bhoth
- Village
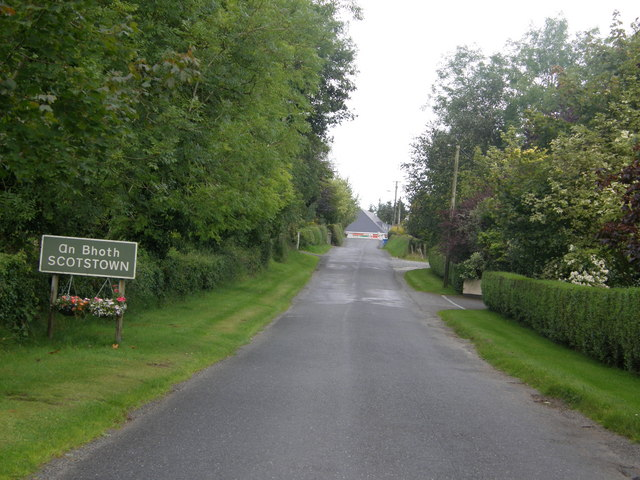
- Road signage on the approach to Scotstown

- Location in Ireland
- Coordinates: 54°16′40″N 7°04′02″W
- Country: Ireland
- Province: Ulster
- County: County Monaghan
- Elevation: 72 m (236 ft)

Population (2016)
  - Total: 361
- Time zone: UTC+0 (WET)
  - Summer (DST): UTC-1 (IST (WEST))

Scotstown (Irish: Baile an Scotaigh) is a village in the townland of Bough (Irish: An Bhoth, meaning 'place of huts') in north County Monaghan, Ireland. Scotstown is located in the parish of Tydavnet, along the Monaghan section of the River Blackwater, Scotstown being the village closest to the river's source. Scotstown is centred in the townland of Bough, but extends into Carrowhatta, Teraverty, Drumdesco and Stracrunnion townlands.

== Name ==
Several theories exist around the origin of the English Language name, either deriving from the fact that a lot of Scots were located there during the Plantation of Monaghan (County Monaghan not having been part of the Plantation of Ulster), or it may have been named after a local landowner, George Scott, in the 1660s. Older documents, including Thom's Irish Almanac of 1862, alternate between referencing the village as Scottstown and Scotstown.

With regard to its Irish language names, the traditional name of An Bhoth or An Bhothach comes from the townland of Bough, where the village is centred, with the likely meaning of tent or hut, suggesting humble origins for the village. This is the name appearing on signs as you enter the village. On Tailte Éireann maps and road signs, the village also carries the name Baile an Scotaigh, which literally means 'town of the Scot'. This is a comparatively rare occurrence of the Irish form being a translation of the English form, as opposed to the Irish form being the original. An Bhoth is used by the local Gaelic Athletic Association club and the local school.

== History ==
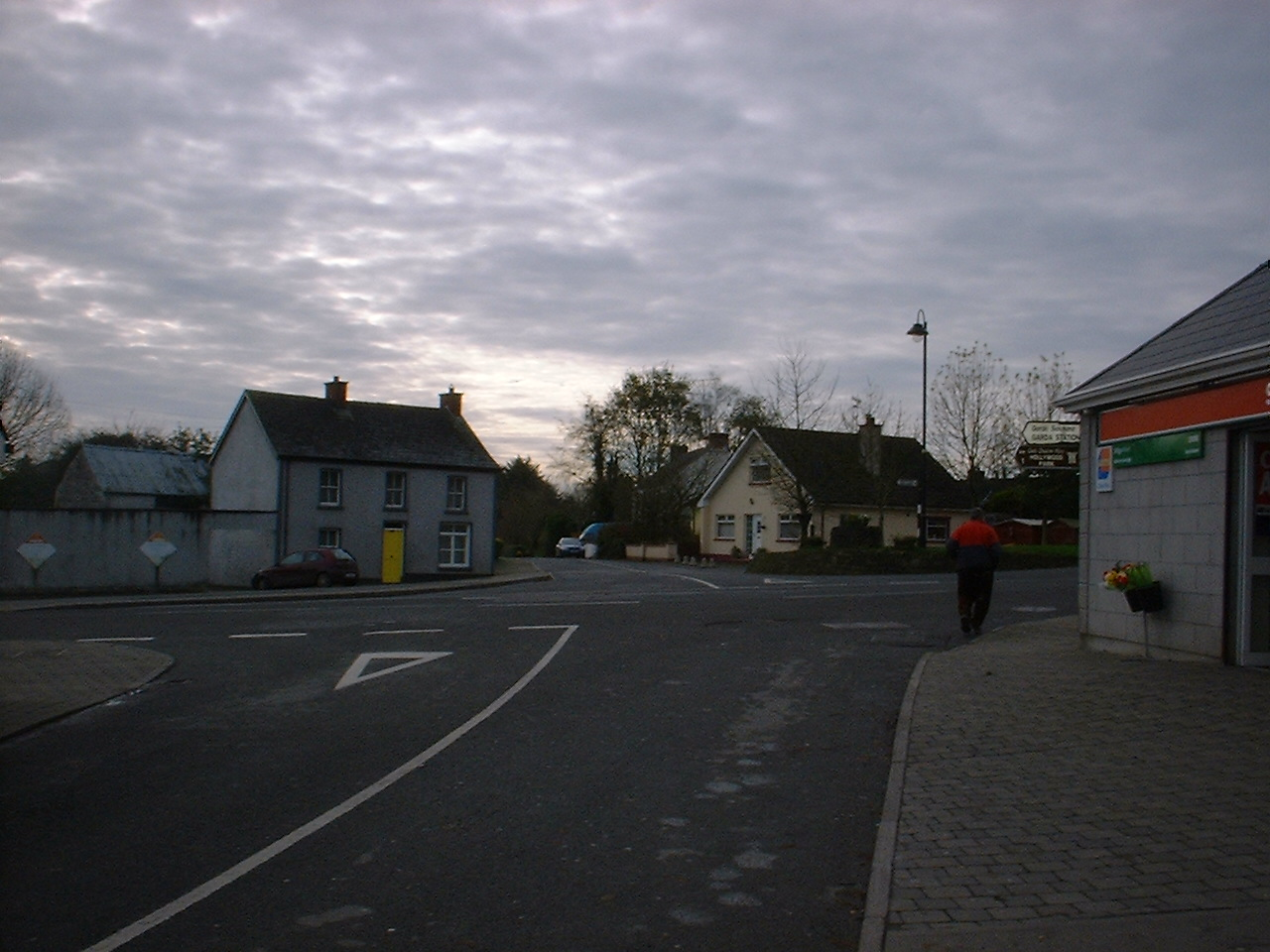
Scotstown village

A crannóg in the local Hollywood lake was the headquarters of Patrick Mac Art Moyle MacMahon. In 1591, Lord Deputy Fitzwilliam broke up the MacMahon lordship in Monaghan when "The MacMahon", hereditary leader of the sept, resisted the imposition of an English sheriff; he was hanged and his lordship divided. Patrick Mac Art Moyle MacMahon became one of the independent leaders of the divided MacMahon lordship. The MacMahons generally fought amongst themselves during most of the Nine Years' War (1594–1603), and Patrick Mac Art Moyle MacMahon, along with other MacMahon leaders, ultimately surrendered to Baron Mountjoy in 1601. Although the MacMahon's retained most of their land after the war, unable to raise taxes they would eventually give up their land as payment for those taxes.

A Catholic church was built in the neighbouring townland of Drumdesco in 1785 (rebuilt in the 1820s), referred to locally as Urbleshanny Chapel, but officially dedicated to St Mary. Church registers go back to 1835 for births and 1825 for marriages. It is one of the three catholic churches in the Parish of Tydavnet. St. Mary's has an adjoining cemetery with graves dating back to the late 18th century. Urbleshanny chapel served as a pro-cathedral for the Catholic Diocese of Clogher from 1801 to 1824, while Dr. James Murphy was bishop. At the time it was noted to have no ceiling, no boards on the floor, and only partially fitted with pews. A tradition in Urbleshanny after weddings was to hold a race for a bottle of whiskey, and there is still a place near the chapel called Whiskey Hollow were these races were said to have taken place. Another Presbyterian cemetery exists close to the village centre, but is no longer in use.

The village national school is also called Urbleshanny and is located in Carrowhatta. Urbleshanny National School opened on the current site in 1932. An earlier school, of the same name, is reputed to have been the earliest Catholic school in the Diocese of Clogher, having been set up in 1791, just after the penal laws were repealed.

In the 18th and 19th centuries, the lowlands surrounding Scotstown were favoured by the landed classes, and as a consequence, they have left some ornamental woodland behind, including Hollywood and Mullaghmore.

During the 18th century, Scotstown developed as a small market centre and by the 1830s, Scotstown was known to have a thriving fair, which centred on the village green, and the green is still an open space today. Records show that traders came to sell calico, printed and course linens, stockings, socks, combs, brushes, cutlery and other hardware. Also in the 18th century, Scotstown served as a depot for quarried stones coming from a number of locations in the Sliabh Beagh mountains.

It is on record in 1938 as having a blacksmith. Scotstown also had a Royal Irish Constabulary (RIC) barracks, with probably 4 officers stationed here. Electric power first arrived in Scotstown in 1948.

== The Troubles ==
North Monaghan is a staunchly Republican area. The Partition of Ireland in the early 1920s has had a huge impact on the people and their way of life for generations. In the 1970s, 1980s and 1990s, during The Troubles, Scotstown and its surrounding hinterland was known for having a large number of active members of the Provisional IRA. The area was always of significant interest to both the Garda Síochána (a force usually known simply as 'the Garda') and the British Crown forces.

One of the most notorious members of the Provisional IRA in the area, Séamus McElwain, from Knockatallon, was killed whilst attempting to ambush a British Army Patrol close to the neighbouring village of Roslea in the south-east of County Fermanagh on 26 April 1986. His subsequent funeral at Urbleshanny Chapel in Scotstown was a huge event, with Gerry Adams and Martin McGuinness in attendance, and over 4,000 people attending to pay their respects. The local battalion of the Provisional IRA put on a huge show of strength at the funeral and performed a three-volley salute over the coffin. A memorial to him was erected by the local people at Corlatt, Knockatallon.

== Sport ==
Scotstown GAA is the local Gaelic football club, which has had some success in the past, and is currently ranked 3rd in towns winning the Ulster Senior Club Football Championship. Its last victory was in 2013 and before that was 1989. Seán McCague, a native of Scotstown, was also GAA president from 2000 to 2003.

== Amenities ==
Formerly, Scotstown had two furniture manufacturers, which provided employment directly within the village. It also has four public houses, a small grocery shop/post office, a pharmacy and several other small retail outlets.

During October, Scotstown hosts a traditional music festival, Scoil Cheoil na Botha, which features workshops, concerts and sessions.

Each summer, the Tydavnet Parish Show is held near Scotstown in the townland of Drumshevra.

== Transport ==
Local Link bus route MN1 links the village with Monaghan several times daily from Monday to Sunday inclusive.

== Places of interest ==
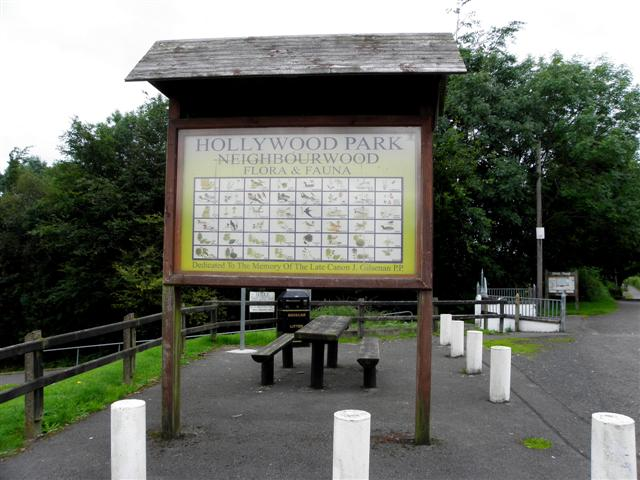
Sign at the Hollywood recreational area

Just outside Scotstown is Hollywood Park recreational area, centred on a lake. A local voluntary committee purchased the lake and its surrounds in 1969, and since then have developed the park with the support of various funding agencies, private donations and Monaghan County Council. The lake itself is stocked with bream, rudd (which locals call roach), perch and pike.

A number of marked mountain trails are maintained in the nearby Sliabh Beagh area. A tourism centre and hotel have been opened in Corlat as a staging point for these walks.

A commemorative "famine stone", marking the location where potato blight was first noticed in County Monaghan, can be seen in the nearby townland of Sheskin.

== See also ==
- People from Scotstown, County Monaghan
- List of towns and villages in Ireland
