= Skeatry =

Townland in County Monaghan, Ireland

Skeatry (Irish: Scéatraigh, meaning 'spewing/trickling of water') is a townland in the north of County Monaghan in Ireland. It covers an area of about 62 acres, which is approximately 0.25 square kilometers. The townland of Sheskin borders it to the North-East. It is located about 11km away from Monaghan town.
