= Mull (geographical term) =

Term for rounded, tree-less summit

In the field of topography, the term mull is an Anglicization of the Gaelic word maol, a noun that describes a rounded hill, a summit, and a mountain that is bare of trees; maol also is a Gaelic usage that refers to the forehead and to a shaved head; as an adjective, maol describes something that is bare, that is dull, or that is bald. In south-western Scotland, the usage of Maol describes the topographies of headlands and promontories, specifically, the summit of a promontory and the extreme of a peninsula.

Gaelic spelling requires that the word maol, be lenited in certain syntactical arrangements: That a letter h is inserted after the first letter, if the first letter is a consonant, but not the letters r, l, or n. The added letter h either silences the preceding consonant or changes the sound of the consonant, e.g. mh and bh either are silent or are sounded as an English letter v. In the genitive case, in addition to lenition, the last consonant must be slender, preceded and followed by an i or an e. Because both vowels in the word maol are broad, a letter i is inserted after it, those two changes alter the sounding of the Gaelic maol as the English mull — mhaoil, rhyming with well, as in Creachmhaoil (creach + maol). Consequently, when combined in Gaelic place names, maol is not Anglicized as mull, yet, as a toponym, the place name Creachmhaoil is Anglicized to Craughwell.

The Gaelic spellings mullach and mullagh are variants of maol and mull. In the Dwelly's (Scottish) Gaelic-to-English dictionary defines the word mull as: the top, summit, or extremity of anything. Moreover, in Irish place names, mull is common to: Mullaghmore (An Mullach Mór) and Mullaghaneany, Mullaghcloga and Mullaghcarn.

Notable mulls include:

- The Mull of Kintyre
- The Mull of Galloway
- The Mull of Oa, otherwise simply The Oa, a headland on Islay
- The Mull of Cara, a promontory at the south of Cara Island
- The Mull of Logan, a promontory on the Rhins of Galloway
- Mull Head, a headland on the Orkney Mainland
- Mull of Miljoan, a hilltop in Carrick, South Ayrshire
- Mull of Ross, a prominent hill near Kirkcudbright in Dumfries and Galloway
- Mull of Sinniness, a summit overlooking Luce Bay near Auchenmalg
- Creachmhaoil in County Galway, in Ireland.
- Mull Hill, Isle of Man.

Mull, the Inner Hebridean island's name has a different, pre-Gaelic derivation.
