= Derryarrit =

Townland in County Monaghan, Ireland

Coordinates: 54.28°N 7.12°W

Derryarrit (Irish: Doire Airid) is small a townland in the north of County Monaghan in Ireland. It is located to the south of Sheskin, and is 1.1 square kilometres (0.4 sq mi) in area.
