= Killycarnan =

Town in Ireland

Killycarnan (Irish: Coill Charnáin, meaning 'wood of the small carn/heap') is a townland in the north of County Monaghan in Ireland, to the south east of the townland of Sheskin in the parish of Tydavnet.

Killycarnan was once the location of a national school, which subsequently was relocated to Sheskin, but kept the name of Killycarnan. The Sheskin school was also subsequently closed in the 1980s.
