= R186 road (Ireland) =

Road in Ireland

R186 road
- Bóthar R186
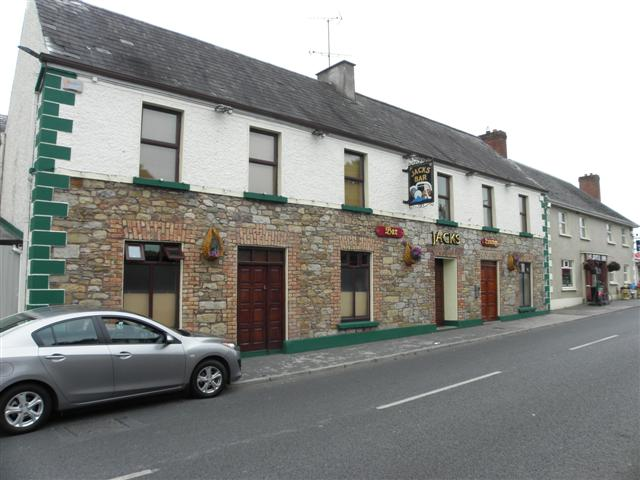
- R186 at Tydavnet

Route information
- Length: 18.5 km (11.5 mi)

Location
- Country: Ireland
- Primary destinations: County Monaghan; leaves the N54 near Monaghan; Tydavnet; Terminates at the Republic of Ireland–United Kingdom border

Highway system
- Roads in Ireland; Motorways; Primary; Secondary; Regional

The R186 road is a regional road in Ireland linking Monaghan in County Monaghan and the Republic of Ireland–United Kingdom border. The road passes through the village of Tydavnet. The road is 18.5 km (11.5 mi) long.

== See also ==
- Roads in Ireland
- National primary road
- National secondary road
