= Helvick =

Townland in County Waterford, Ireland

- Headland
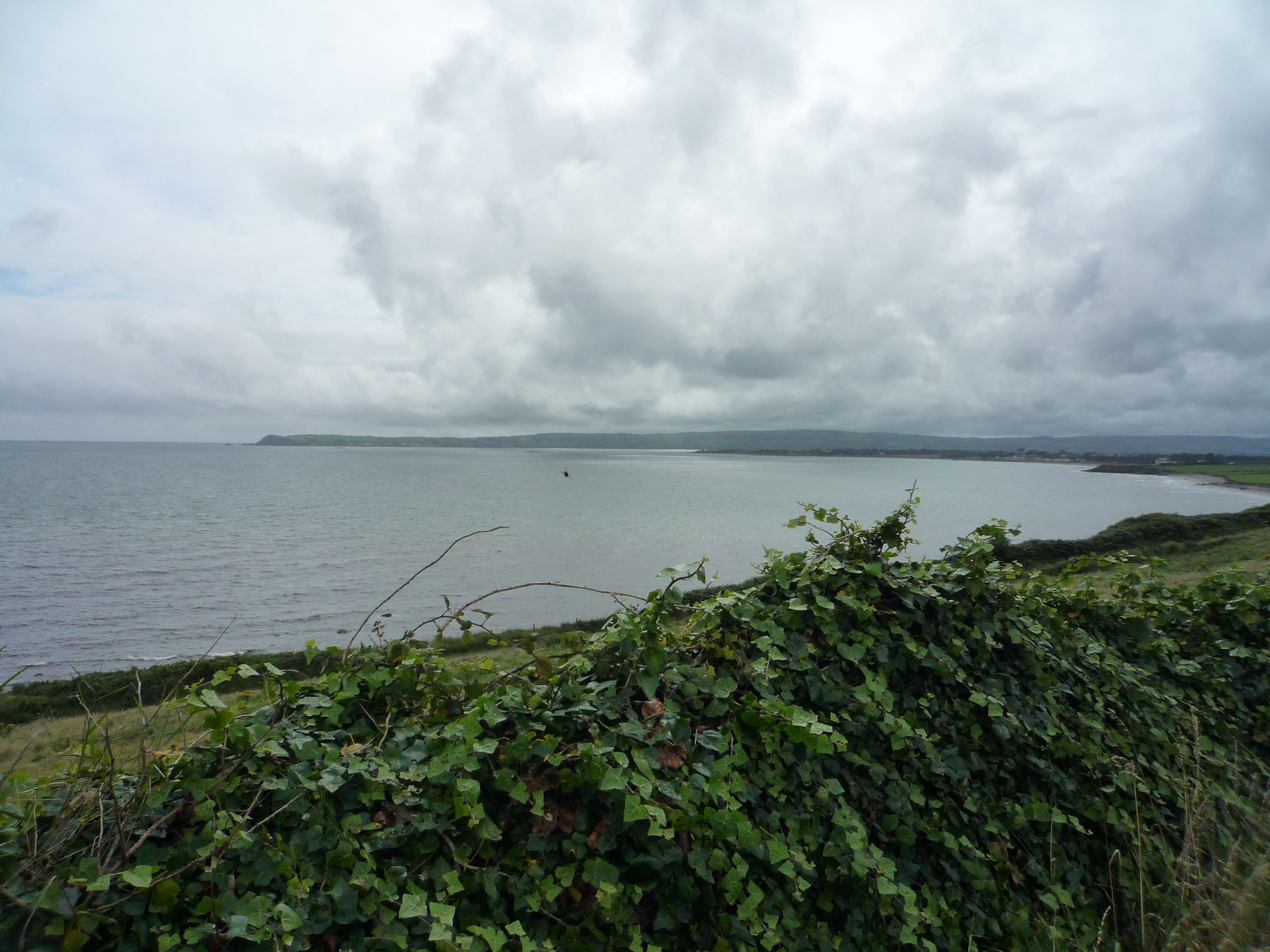
- View from Ballyvoile out to Helvick Head

- Coordinates: 52.053615°N 7.536734°W
- Age: 380 million years
- Geology: Old Red Sandstone

Helvick or Helvick Head (Irish: Heilbhic, Ceann Heilbhic, Old Norse: Hellavík) is a headland on the southern end of Dungarvan Harbour, Ireland; it is the eastern tip of the Ring Peninsula.

Formed of Old Red Sandstone, it is the easternmost protrusion of a ridge that begins near Cork City.

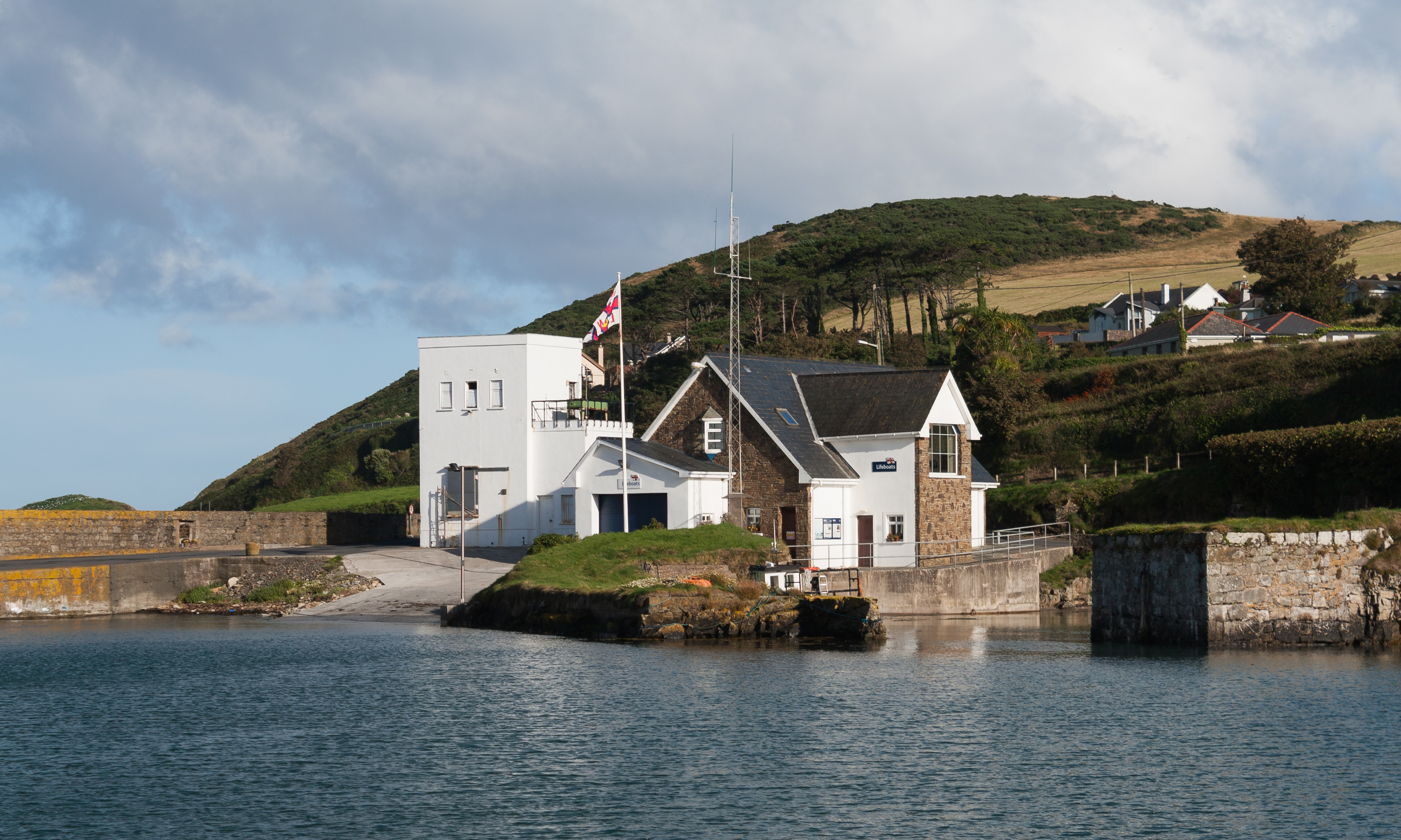
Royal National Lifeboat Institution station

== Name ==
Helvick is one of a very few Irish place names derived from Old Norse. The second part, -vík, means "bay" (cf. Smerwick). The meaning of the first part is unclear, but it may mean "healthy", "white", "holy", or "safe"; compare with Hellvik, Norway.

== Wildlife ==
Helvick Head is a Special Area of Conservation (SAC). The cliffs are a nesting site for seabirds including choughs and shag. Other bird species include razorbill, Northern fulmar, peregrine falcon, black-legged kittiwake, black guillemot, and common murre (guillemot).

Plants include gorse, bell heather, ling, devil's-bit scabious, heath bedstraw, bog violet, burnet rose, thrift, kidney vetch, sea mayweed and wild carrot.

== Lifeboat station ==
The Royal National Lifeboat Institution opened a lifeboat station at Dungarvan in 1859. It was moved to Crow's Point at Helvick in 1899. The station was closed in 1969 but a new inshore lifeboat station was established in 1997. The lifeboat was housed in temporary accommodation until the permanent facilities were ready in 1999.
