= Irish exonyms =

This is a list of Irish language exonyms for places outside of Ireland. The tables contain both endonyms and exonyms of places around the world, with the exonyms written in Irish and the endonyms in their regional language(s).

== Algeria ==
Algeria an Ailgéir
English name	Irish name	Endonym		Notes
English name	Irish name	Name	Language	Notes
Algiers	Cathair na hAilgéire	Al Jāza'ir (الجزائر)	Standard Arabic	
Algiers	Cathair na hAilgéire	Dzayer	Berber	

== Belgium ==
Belgium an Bheilg
English name	Irish name	Endonym		Notes
English name	Irish name	Name	Language	Notes
Antwerp	Antuairp	Antwerpen	Dutch	
Brussels	an Bhruiséil	Brussel	Dutch	
Brussels	an Bhruiséil	Bruxelles	French	
Flanders	Flóndras	Vlaanderen	Dutch	
Leuven	Lováin	Leuven	Dutch	Site of St Anthony's College, Leuven, a centre of Irish learning and culture on the Continent
Ostend	Ostainn	Oostende	Dutch	
Wallonia	an Vallúin	Wallonie	French	
Wallonia	an Vallúin	Walonreye	Walloon	

== Bosnia and Herzegovina ==
Bosnia and Herzegovina an Bhoisnia agus Heirseagaivéin
English name	Irish name	Endonym		Notes
English name	Irish name	Name	Language	Notes
Sarajevo	Sairéavo	Sarajevo (Сарајево)	Bosnian	

== Canada ==
Canada Ceanada
English name	Irish name	Endonym		Notes
English name	Irish name	Name	Language	Notes
Labrador	(Leithinis) Labradar	Labrador	English, French	
Labrador	(Leithinis) Labradar	Nunatsuak	Inuttitut	
Newfoundland	Talamh an Éisc	Ikkarumikluak	Inuttitut	Irish name means "fishing grounds"; Newfoundland was settled by large numbers of Irish emigrants
Newfoundland	Talamh an Éisc	Newfoundland	English	Irish name means "fishing grounds"; Newfoundland was settled by large numbers of Irish emigrants
Newfoundland	Talamh an Éisc	Terre-Neuve	French	Irish name means "fishing grounds"; Newfoundland was settled by large numbers of Irish emigrants
Nova Scotia	Albain Nua	Alba Nuadh	Scottish Gaelic	
Nova Scotia	Albain Nua	Nouvelle-Écosse	French	
Nova Scotia	Albain Nua	Nova Scotia	English	

== China ==
China an tSín
English name	Irish name	Endonym		Notes
English name	Irish name	Name	Language	Notes
Beijing	Bésing	Beijing (北京)	Mandarin	
Tibet	Tibéid	Bhö (བོད)	Tibetan	

== Croatia ==
Croatia an Chróit
English name	Irish name	Endonym	Notes
Dalmatia	an Dalmáit	Dalmacija	
Zagreb	Ságrab	Zagreb	

== Cyprus ==
Cyprus an Chipir
English name	Irish name	Endonym		Notes
English name	Irish name	Name	Language	Notes
Nicosia	an Leafcóis; an Nicóis	Lefkosía	Greek	
Nicosia	an Leafcóis; an Nicóis	Lefkoşa	Turkish	

== Czech Republic ==
Czech Republic an tSeic
English name	Irish name	Endonym	Notes
Bohemia	an Bhohéim	Čechy	
Prague	Prág	Praha	

== Denmark ==
Denmark an Danmhairg
English name	Irish name	Endonym	Notes
Copenhagen	Cóbanhávan	København	
Jutland	an Iútlainn	Jylland	
Zealand	an tSéalainn	Sjælland	

== Egypt ==
Egypt an Éigipt
English name	Irish name	Endonym		Notes
English name	Irish name	Name	Language	Notes
Cairo	Caireo			

== France ==
France an Fhrainc
English name	Irish name	French place		Notes
English name	Irish name	Name	Language	Notes
Bordeaux	Bordghal	Bordeaux	French	
Bordeaux	Bordghal	Bordèu	Gascon	From Latin Burdigula
Brittany	an Bhríotáin	Breizh	Breton	
Brittany	an Bhríotáin	Bretagne	French	
Burgundy	an Bhurgúin	Bourgogne	French	
Corsica	an Chorsaic	Corse	French	
Corsica	an Chorsaic	Corsica	Italian	
Lorraine	an Lorráin	Lorraine	French	
Lorraine	an Lorráin	Lottringe	West Franconian	
Lorraine	an Lorráin	Louréne	Lorrain	
Normandy	an Normainn	Normandie	French	
Normandy	an Normainn	Normaundie	Norman	
Paris	Páras	Paris	French	

== Germany ==
Germany an Ghearmáin
English name	Irish name	Endonym		Notes
English name	Irish name	Name	Language	Notes
Bavaria	an Bhaváir	Bayern	German	
Berlin	Beirlín	Berlin	German	
Saxony	an tSacsain	Sachsen	German	
Saxony	an tSacsain	Saggsn	Upper Saxon	
Saxony	an tSacsain	Sakska	Upper Sorbian	

== Great Britain ==
Great Britain and Crown dependencies: an Bhreatain Mhór
English name	Irish name	Endonym		Notes
English name	Irish name	Name	Language	Notes
Aberdeen	Obar Dheathain	Obar Dheathain	Scottish Gaelic	
Bristol	Briostó	Bristol	English	
Cardiff	Caedydd	Caerdydd	Welsh	
Carlisle	Cathair Luail	Carlisle	English	
Coatbridge	Drochaid an Chóta	Drochaid a' Chòta	Scottish Gaelic	
Cornwall	an Chorn	Kernow	Cornish	
Cornwall	Corn na Breataine	Kernow	Cornish	
Douglas	Dúlais	Doolish	Manx	
Glasgow	Glaschú	Glaschu	Scottish Gaelic	
Dundee	Dún Déagh	Dùn Dèagh	Scottish Gaelic	
Edinburgh	Dún Éideann	Dùn Èideann	Scottish Gaelic	
England	Sasana	England	English	From Old Irish Saxain (“Saxons, England”).
Guernsey	Geansaí			
Hebrides	Inse Ghall	na h-Innse Gall	Scottish Gaelic	
Inverness	Inbhear Nis	Inbhir Nis	Scottish Gaelic	
Isle of Man	Manainn	Mannin	Manx	Translation Oileán Mhanann (from Manx: Ellan Vannin) also used
Isle of Wight	Inis Iocht	Isle of Wight	English	
Jersey	Geirsí			
Liverpool	Learpoll, Learpholl	Liverpool	English	
London	Londain	London	English	
Manchester	Manchain	Manchester	English	From Latin Mancunia
Orkney	Inse Orc	Arcaibh	Scottish Gaelic	
Oxford	Áth na nDamh	Oxford	English	Calque, literally "ford of the oxen"
Perth	Peairt	Peairt	Scottish Gaelic	
Scotland	Albain	Alba	Scottish Gaelic	See Alba
Severn	an tSabhrainn	Severn	English	
Severn	an tSabhrainn	Hafren	Welsh	
Stirling	Sruighle	Sruighlea	Scottish Gaelic	English name also used in Irish
Strathclyde	Srath Chluaidh	Srath Chluaidh	Scottish Gaelic	
Thames	an Tamais	Thames	English	
Wales	an Bhreatain Bheag	Cymru	Welsh	Literally "Little Britain."
York	Eabhrac	York	English	From the Latin Eboracum.

== Greece ==
Greece an Ghréig
English name	Irish name	Endonym		Notes
English name	Irish name	Language	Notes	Notes
Athens	an Aithin			
Crete	an Chréit			
Rhodes	Ródas			
Thessaloniki	Teasaloinicé			

== Iceland ==
Iceland an Íoslainn
English name	Irish name	Endonym	Notes
Reykjavík	Réicivíc	Reykjavík	

== India ==
India an India, an Ind
English name	Irish name	Endonym		Notes
English name	Irish name	Name	Language	Notes
Delhi	Deilí			
Kolkata	Calcúta			

== Indonesia ==
Indonesia an Indinéis
English name	Irish name	Endonym		Notes
English name	Irish name	Name	Language	Notes
Jakarta	Iacárta	Jakarta	Indonesian	

== Israel ==
Israel an Iosrael
English name	Irish name	Endonym		Notes
English name	Irish name	Name	Language	Notes
Jerusalem	Iarúsailéim	Al-Quds	Arabic	From Latin Ierusalem. The earliest Irish form is Old Irish Hierosalem, from the 8th-century poems of Blathmac mac Con Brettan.
Jerusalem	Iarúsailéim	Yerushalayim (ירושלים)	Hebrew	From Latin Ierusalem. The earliest Irish form is Old Irish Hierosalem, from the 8th-century poems of Blathmac mac Con Brettan.

== Italy ==
Italy an Iodáil
English name	Irish name	Endonym		Notes
English name	Irish name	Name	Language	Notes
Florence	Flórans			
Lombardy	an Lombaird			
Milan	Milan/ Milano			
Piedmont	Píodmant			
Rome	an Róimh			
Sardinia	an tSairdín			
Sicily	an tSicil			
Tuscany	an Tuscáin			
Venice	an Veinéis			

== Libya ==
Libya an Libia
English name	Irish name	Endonym		Notes
English name	Irish name	Name	Language	Notes
Tripoli	Tripilí			

== Lithuania ==
Lithuania an Liotuáin
English name	Irish name	Endonym		Notes
English name	Irish name	Name	Language	Notes
Vilnius	Vilnias	Vilnius	Lithuanian	

== Moldova ==
Moldova an Mholdóiv
English name	Irish name	Endonym		Notes
English name	Irish name	Name	Language	Notes
Chişinău	Císineá			

== Myanmar ==
Myanmar Maenmar
English name	Irish name	Endonym		Notes
English name	Irish name	Name	Language	Notes
Yangon	Rangún			

== Palestine ==
Palestine an Phalaistín
English name	Irish name	Endonym		Notes
English name	Irish name	Name	Language	Notes
Bethlehem	Beithil	بيت لحم (Beit Lahm)	Arabic	
Bethlehem	Beithil	בֵּית לֶחֶם (Bet Leḥem)	Hebrew	
Jerusalem	Iarúsailéim	القُدس (Al-Quds)	Arabic	From Latin Ierusalem. The earliest Irish form is Old Irish Hierosalem, from the 8th-century poems of Blathmac mac Con Brettan.
Jerusalem	Iarúsailéim	יְרוּשָׁלַיִם (Yershuláyim)	Hebrew	From Latin Ierusalem. The earliest Irish form is Old Irish Hierosalem, from the 8th-century poems of Blathmac mac Con Brettan.
Nazareth	Nazarat	النَّاصِرَة (an-Nāṣira)	Arabic	
Nazareth	Nazarat	נָצְרַת (Natsrat)	Hebrew	
Nazareth	Nazarat	ܢܨܪܬ, (Naṣrath)	Imperial Aramaic	

== Poland ==
Poland an Pholainn
English name	Irish name	Endonym		Notes
English name	Irish name	Name	Language	Notes
Warsaw	Vársá	Warzawa	Polish	

== Portugal ==
Portugal an Phortaingéil
English name	Irish name	Endonym		Notes
English name	Irish name	Name	Language	Notes
Lisbon	Liospóin	Lisboa	Portuguese	
Madeira	Maidéara			

== Romania ==
Romania an Rómáin
English name	Irish name	Endonym		Notes
English name	Irish name	Name	Language	Notes
Bucharest	Búcairist	Bucureşti	Romanian	

== Russia ==
Russia an Rúis
English name	Irish name	Endonym		Notes
English name	Irish name	Name	Language	Notes
Moscow	Moscó	Moskva	Russian	
Saint Petersburg	Cathair Pheadair	Sankt Peterburg	Russian	
Siberia	an tSibéir			
Ural	an Úrail			

== Serbia ==
Serbia an tSeirbia
English name	Irish name	Endonym	Notes
Belgrade	Béalgrád	Beograd	

== South Korea ==
South Korea an Chóiré Theas
English name	Irish name	Endonym	Notes
Seoul	Súl		

== Spain ==
Spain an Spáinn
English name	Irish name	Endonym		Notes
English name	Irish name	Name	Language	Notes
A Coruña	an Choróin			Obsolete
A Coruña	Cathair na Cruinne			
Aragon	an Aragóin			
Galicia	an Ghailís			
Mallorca	Mallarca			
Menorca	Mionarca			
Seville	Seville			

== Sudan ==
Sudan an tSúdáin
English name	Irish name	Endonym		Notes
English name	Irish name	Name	Language	Notes
Khartoum	Cartúm			

== Sweden ==
Sweden an tSualainn
English name	Irish name	Endonym		Notes
English name	Irish name	Name	Language	Notes
Götaland	an Ghotlann	Götaland	Swedish	
Stockholm	Stócólm	Stockholm	Swedish	

== Switzerland ==
Switzerland an Eilvéis
English name	Irish name	Endonym		Notes
English name	Irish name	Name	Language	Notes
Geneva	an Ghinéiv	Genf	German	
Geneva	an Ghinéiv	Genève	French	

== Syria ==
Syria an tSiria
English name	Irish name	Endonym		Notes
English name	Irish name	Name	Language	Notes
Damascus	an Damaisc	Dimašq	Standard Arabic	

== Tunisia ==
Tunisia an Túnéis
English name	Irish name	Tunisian place		Notes
English name	Irish name	Name	Language	Notes
Tunis	Túinis			

== Ukraine ==
Ukraine an Úcráin
English name	Irish name	Endonym		Notes
English name	Irish name	Name	Language	Notes
Crimea	an Chrimé			
Kyiv	Cív	Kyiv	Ukrainian	

== United Arab Emirates ==
United Arab Emirates Aontas na nÉimíríochtaí Arabacha
English name	Irish name	Endonym		Notes
English name	Irish name	Name	Language	Notes
Abu Dhabi	Abú Daibí			

== United States ==
United States Stáit Aontaithe
English name	Irish name	Endonym		Notes
English name	Irish name	Name	Language	Notes
Boston	Bostún	Boston	English	
Ellis Island	Oileán an Choraintín	Ellis Island	English	Meaning ‘Quarantine Island,’ reflecting the fact that Irish arrivals in New York were seen as carriers of infections and obliged to spend periods of quarantine there.
Hawai'i	Haváí	Hawai'i	English, Hawaiian	
New York City	Nua-Eabhrac	New York City	English	From the Latin Eboracum, the old name for York, England.

== Vietnam ==
Vietnam Vítneam
English name	Irish name	Endonym		Notes
English name	Irish name	Name	Language	Notes
Hanoi	Hanáí	Hà Nội	Vietnamese	

== See also ==
- List of European exonyms
