= Ballinode =

Village in County Monaghan, Ireland

Ballinode Béal Átha an Fhóid
- Village
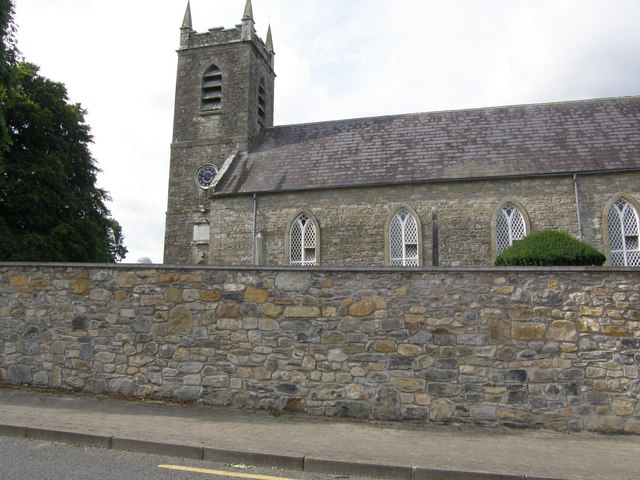
- St Dymna's Church of Ireland church in Ballinode

- Location in Ireland
- Coordinates: 54°16′09″N 7°02′02″W
- Country: Ireland
- Province: Ulster
- County: County Monaghan

Population (2016)
  - Total: 470
- Time zone: UTC+0 (WET)
  - Summer (DST): UTC-1 (IST (WEST))

Ballinode, also known as Bellanode (Irish: Béal Átha an Fhóid), is a village situated approximately 6 kilometres (3.7 mi) from Monaghan Town and 3 kilometres (1.9 mi) from Scotstown in County Monaghan, Ireland. The village, located in the Parish of Tydavnet, straddles the Monaghan Blackwater (a tributary of the River Corr, itself a tributary of the Ulster Blackwater) and has a Church of Ireland church with clock tower, cemetery, and church hall; one public house, and a takeaway. There also is an astroturf football pitch in the village.

== Events ==
"On the road in Ballinode" was an annual festival held in Ballinode throughout the 1990s. It attracted visitors from all over the county and had events such as cart racing, amusements and canoeing races on the river.

== Transport ==
Local Link bus route M1 links the village with Monaghan several times daily Mondays to Saturdays inclusive.

== See also ==
- List of towns and villages in Ireland
