= Knockatallon =

Knockatallan Cnoc an tSalainn
- Townland
- Location in Ireland
- Coordinates: 54°17′45″N 7°08′57″W
- Country: Ireland
- Province: Ulster
- County: County Monaghan
- Time zone: UTC+0 (WET)
  - Summer (DST): UTC-1 (IST (WEST))

Knockatallon or Knockatallan (Irish: Cnoc an tSalainn, meaning 'hill of salt') is a hamlet and townland in the north of County Monaghan in Ireland, being located in the parish of Tydavnet. The Roman Catholic parish church is located in the village of Tydavnet itself. Knockatallan is located to the west of Sheskin. The Knockatallan name is also used by locals to refer to a larger area including several other townlands such as Knockacullion and Corlat.

Not quite a village, Knockatallon's diminishing business/social community is centred on what is known as the Cross Roads. This includes Knockatallon's national school, St. Joseph's National School, a small grocery store and until recently a post office (closed in August, 2007).

In recent times Knockatallon has been largely eclipsed by a neighbouring townland of Corlat as a community centre. St Joseph's Catholic church is located in the townland of Corlat.
