= Mull of Kintyre =

Headland in southwest Scotland

Coordinates: 55°18′38″N 5°48′14″W

Mull of Kintyre: Scottish Gaelic: Maol Chinn Tìre
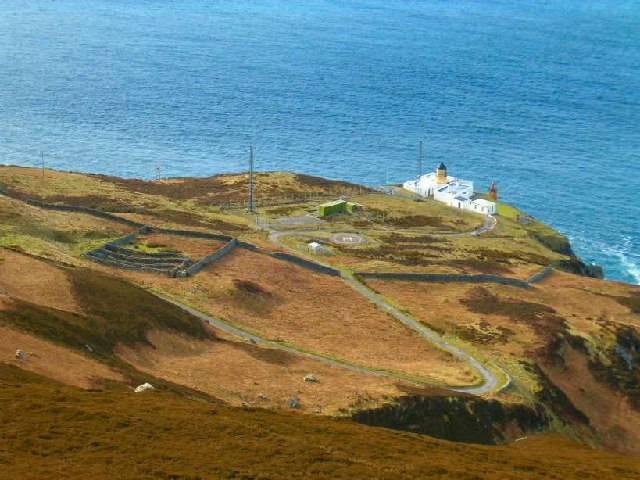
- Mull of Kintyre Lighthouse

- Location within Argyll and Bute
- OS grid reference: NR5908
- Civil parish: Southend
- Council area: Argyll and Bute
- Lieutenancy area: Argyll and Bute
- Country: Scotland
- Sovereign state: United Kingdom
- Post town: Campbeltown
- Postcode district: PA28
- Dialling code: 01586
- Police: Scotland
- Fire: Scottish
- Ambulance: Scottish
- UK Parliament: Argyll, Bute and South Lochaber
- Scottish Parliament: Argyll and Bute

The Mull of Kintyre is the southwesternmost tip of the Kintyre Peninsula (formerly Cantyre) in southwest Scotland. From here, the Antrim coast of Northern Ireland is visible on a calm and clear day, and a historic lighthouse, the second commissioned in Scotland, guides shipping in the intervening North Channel. The area has been immortalised in popular culture by the 1977 hit song "Mull of Kintyre" by Kintyre resident Paul McCartney's band of the time, Wings.

== Etymology ==
The name is an anglicisation of the Gaelic Maol Chinn Tìre (Scottish Gaelic pronunciation: [mɯːl̪ˠ çiɲˈtʲʰiːɾʲə]), 'Rounded [or bare] Headland', where chinn and tìre are respectively the genitive forms of ceann 'head, headland' and tìr 'land, country', so 'Headland Country' or more simply 'Head Land'. The anglicised variant Cantyre derives directly from non-genitive Ceann Tìre Scottish Gaelic pronunciation: [kʲʰaɲˈtʲʰiːɾʲə].

Mull as a geographical term is most commonly found in southwest Scotland, where it is often applied to headlands or promontories, and, often more specifically, for the tip of that promontory or peninsula.

The term mull derives from maol 'bald, bare; baldness, bareness'. The geographical reference is to a land formation bare of trees, such as a rounded hill, summit, mountain, promontory, or headland.

== Geography ==
The Mull is at the extreme south western tip of the Kintyre peninsula, approximately 10 miles (16 kilometres) from Campbeltown in Argyll and Bute, Western Scotland. It is about 8 miles (13 kilometres) beyond the southernmost village of the peninsula, Southend with its tea room and beaches, and reached via a single-track road.

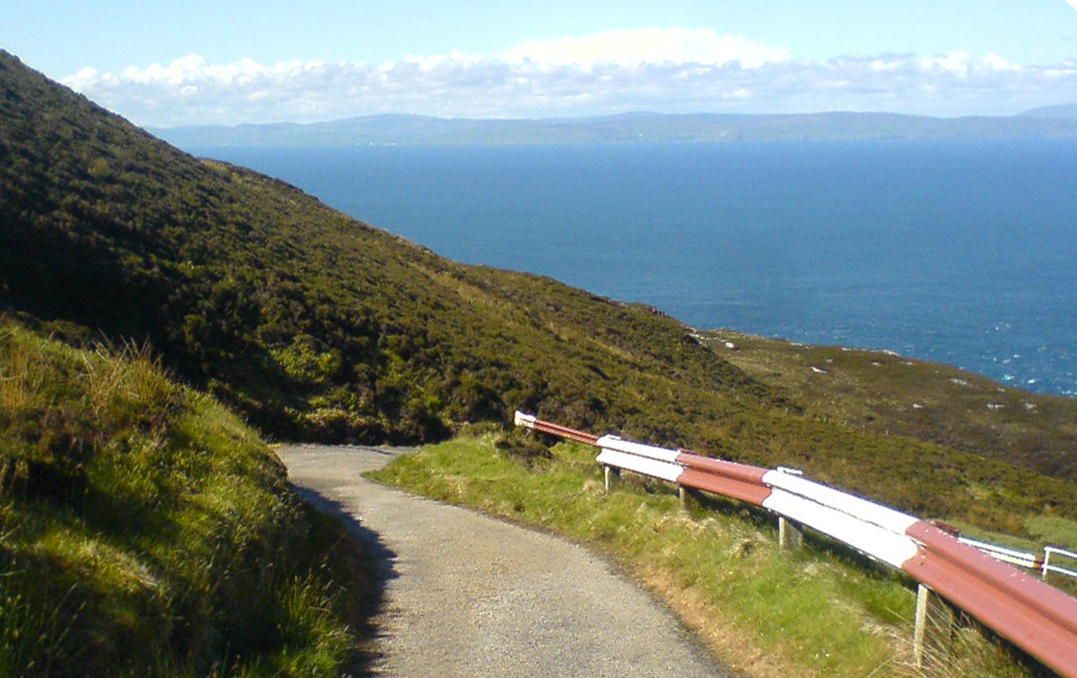
Mull of Kintyre in foreground, Northern Ireland in distance

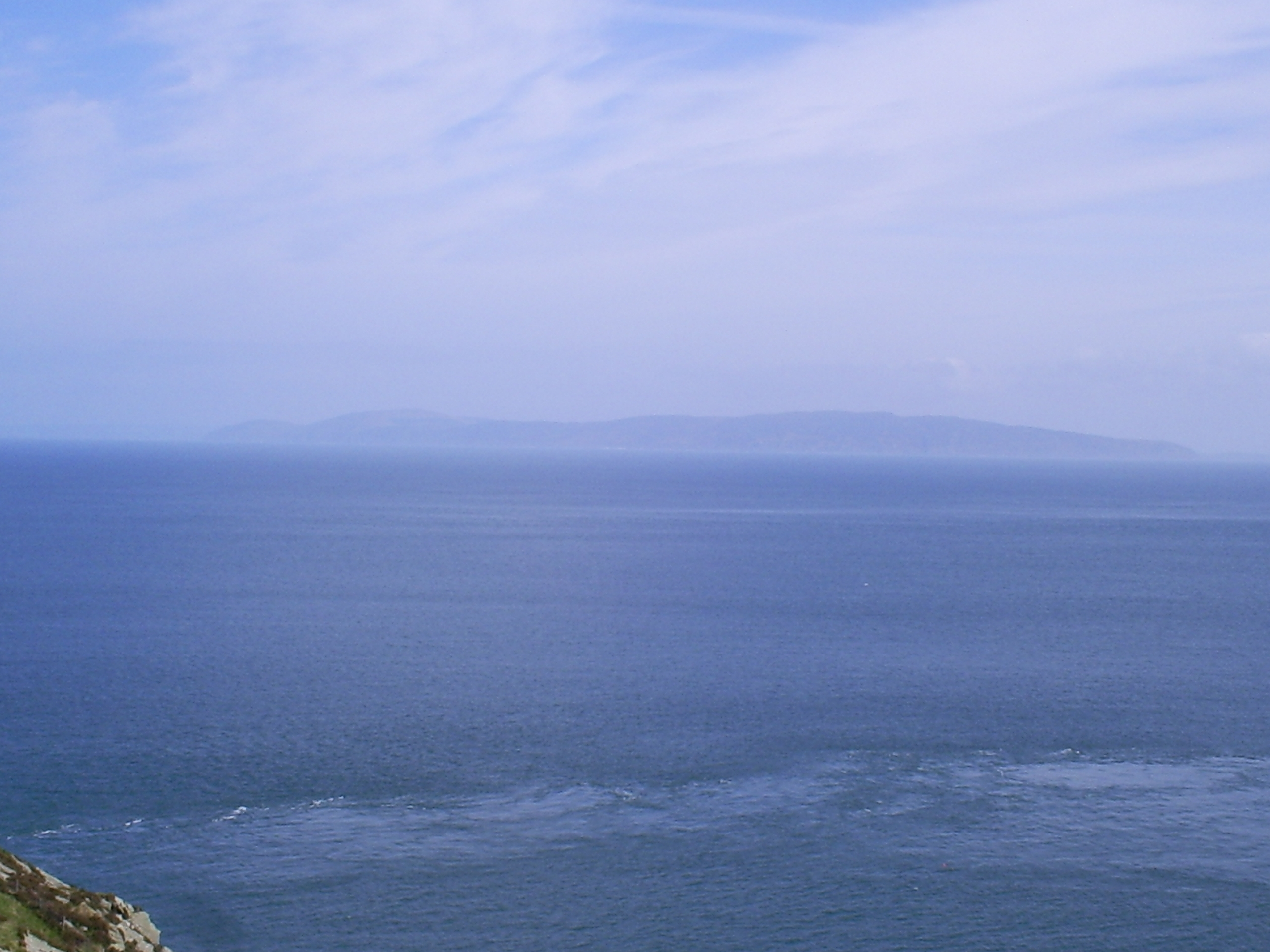
Mull of Kintyre in distance – taken from Torr Head, Northern Ireland

Ailsa Craig and the County Antrim coast of Ulster and Rathlin Island are all clearly visible from the Mull. On clearer days it is also possible to make out Malin Head in Inishowen in County Donegal in the north of Ulster, and the Ayrshire coast on the other side of Ailsa Craig. Other islands in the Firth of Clyde are also visible when looking east, especially from further back along the single track road from Southend village. The Straits of Moyle (part of the North Channel) allow sea passage from the Irish Sea to the Atlantic Ocean. Notoriously strong currents plague the tip of the Kintyre Peninsula creating a hazard to unmotorised craft and virtually impossible for distance swimmers. At its closest point, mainland Ulster is 12 mi (19 km) from the Mull. Owing to the low elevation of Rathlin Island and the high elevation of the Mull of Kintyre it is also possible to see over the top of Rathlin Island to the Antrim coastal town of Ballycastle. Individual houses on the Antrim coast and cars travelling along the coast road can sometimes be seen without the aid of binoculars, visibility conditions depending.

== History ==
The Mull has been an important landbridge throughout history. It is thought that it was used by early humans in their travels from continental Europe to Ireland via Scotland. In more recent times it was used again by the Scotti when they travelled from Ireland to establish the kingdom of Dál Riata in modern-day Argyll.

=== Air crashes ===
The steep cliffs and hills rising out of the sea on all sides, along with the frequent sea mists, have made the area a hazard to flight. It has been the site of numerous air crashes throughout aviation history, and the remains of some of those crashed aircraft still litter the area.

A notable air disaster on the Mull was the RAF Chinook helicopter crash on 2 June 1994.

=== Nautical disaster ===
On 13 June 1858 the SS New York, a steamship converted to sail, was wrecked at the south end of the Mull of Kintyre.

== Mull of Kintyre test ==
Kintyre is highlighted in red. The "Mull of Kintyre" properly refers to the headland at the southernmost end, but in this context the apparent angle of the whole peninsula is the relevant standard against which a penis would be compared.

The Mull of Kintyre test or Mull of Kintyre rule is, according to an urban legend, an unofficial guideline that was used by the British Board of Film Classification (BBFC) in the United Kingdom to decide whether an image of a penis could be shown. According to the myth, the BBFC would not permit the general release of a film or video if it depicted a phallus erect to the point that the angle it made from the vertical was higher than that of the Kintyre peninsula, Argyll and Bute, on maps of Scotland. The BBFC has denied that such a 'test' existed, and maintain it is merely a humorous rumour.

== See also ==
- British Isles fixed sea link connections – which details infrastructure proposals involving the mull.
