= Knockacullion =

Townland in County Monaghan, Ireland

Knockacullion (Irish: Cnoc an Chuilinn, meaning 'hill of the holly') is a small townland in the north of County Monaghan in Ireland. It is 0.25 square kilometres (0.1 sq mi) in area and is located to the north west of Sheskin and south of Corlat. The local economy relies primarily on farming.
