= Corblonog =

Townland in County Monaghan, Ireland

Coordinates: 54.288°N 7.105°W

Corblonog (Irish: Corr Bhlonaige, meaning 'round hill of the fat/lard') is a very small townland in the north of County Monaghan in Ireland. It is 0.2 square kilometres (0.08 sq mi) in area, and lies the east of the townland of Sheskin in the civil parish of Tydavnet.

During the late 19th century, and during the Great Famine, most of the townland, if not all, was owned by the Williamson family. A hill in Corblonog, still carries the name Porridge Hill, as it was the location that the Williamsons provided gruel to those who needed it during the famine. The prefix Cor-, as found in this townland's name, typically refers to small rounded hill, and likely to refer to the same hill as Porridge Hill, being the only prominent hill in this small townland.
