= Ballynoe =

Ballynoe may refer to:

== Northern Ireland ==
- Ballynoe, County Down
- Ballynoe townland, Co Antrim

== Republic of Ireland ==
- Ballynoe, Kinnatalloon, County Cork; rural village
- Ballynoe, Great Island, County Cork; suburb of Cobh
- Ballynoe, Mallow, County Cork; village
- Ballynoe, Fermoy, County Cork; townland
