= R673 road (Ireland) =

Road in Ireland

Coordinates: 51.970422°N 7.769762°W

R673 road
- Bóthar R673

Route information
- Length: 13.4 km (8.3 mi)

Major junctions
- From: N25 Kiely's Crossroads
- Passes through Ardmore
- To: N25 Cleary's Crossroads

Location
- Country: Ireland

Highway system
- Roads in Ireland; Motorways; Primary; Secondary; Regional

The R673 road is a regional road in Ireland, located in County Waterford.

== See also ==
- Transport in Ireland
- Roads in Ireland
