= Blathmac mac Con Brettan =

Irish poet and monk

Blathmac mac Con Brettan was an Irish poet and monk whose floruit was around 760.

Blathmac was the son of Cú Brettan mac Congussa (died 740), seemingly a king of the Airthir, one of the Airgíalla kingdoms, situated in modern-day County Armagh. His brother Donn Bó was killed in battle in 759. Cú Brettan and Donn Bó both appear as characters in the saga Cath Almaine and are portrayed as poets.

Blathmac was educated in a monastic school and went on to become a monk. A manuscript containing his surviving poems, two meditations on the Virgin Mary, Tair cucum a Maire boid and A Maire, a grian ar clainde, once in the possession of Mícheál Ó Cléirigh, is in the National Library of Ireland, where it was re-discovered by Nessa Ní Shéaghdha in 1953.

Art historian Peter Harbison says that at some point, Blathmac probably visited Rome as many of his poems reflect scenes depicted on mosaics in old Roman churches.

== Sources ==
- Robert Welch, Oxford Concise Companion to Irish Literature, 1996. ISBN 0-19-280080-9
- Siobhán Barrett, 'A Study of the Lexicon of the Poems of Blathmac Son of Cú Brettan', PhD-thesis, National University of Ireland Maynooth 2017 (includes complete edition and translation of the poems)
- Siobhán Barrett and David Stifter, 'Blathmac’s stanzas 260–303 on Judgement Day', Celtica 31 (2019): 19‒89.
- James Carney, "Language and literature to 1169" in Dáibhí Ó Cróinín (ed.), A New History of Ireland. Volume I: Prehistoric and Early Ireland, 2005. ISBN 0-19-922665-2
- James Carney, 'The poems of Blathmac, son of Cú Brettan: together with the Irish Gospel of Thomas and a poem on the Virgin Mary'. Irish Texts Society, London 1964
- Edward O'Reilly, A Chronological Account of Nearly Four Hundred Irish Writers, Dublin, 1820 (reprinted 1970)
- Brian Lambkin, "Blathmac and the Céili Dé: a reappraisal", Celtica 23, 1999
- Brian Lambkin, 'The Structure of the Blathmac Poems', Studia Celtica 20–21, 1985–6, 76–77.
- Nessa Ní Shéaghdha, 'The poems of Blathmhac: the ‘fragmentary quatrains', Celtica 23 (1999): 227–230.
- David Stifter, 'The Language of the Poems of Blathmac' (Online)
