= Tullyallen =

Tullyallen may refer to:

- Tullyallen, County Armagh, a townland in County Armagh, Northern Ireland
- Tullyallen, County Louth, a village and townland in County Louth, Ireland
- Tullyallen, County Meath, a civil parish in County Meath, Ireland
- Tullyallen, County Monaghan, a townland in County Monaghan, Ireland
- Tullyallen, County Tyrone, a townland in County Tyrone, Northern Ireland

== See also ==
- Tulliallan Castle, a large house in Kincardine, Fife, Scotland
