= Raheen =

Raheen may refer to:

== Places ==
Australia

- Raheen (estate), mansion in Kew, Melbourne, Australia

Ireland

- Raheen, County Clare, a townland in Tuamgraney
- Raheen, the name of several townlands in County Kerry; see List of townlands of County Kerry
- Raheen, County Laois, village
- Raheen, County Limerick, suburb of Limerick city
- Raheen, County Westmeath, a townland in Ballymore, barony of Rathconrath
- Raheen, County Wexford, village

== See also ==
- Raheens GAA, Gaelic games club in Caragh, County Kildare, Ireland
- Raheny, a town in Dublin with a similar name
