= Ballintober =

Ballintober could refer to two Irish towns:

- Ballintober, County Roscommon
- An alternate spelling for Ballintubber, County Mayo
