= Clogheen =

Clogheen may refer to several places in Ireland:

- Clogheen, a townland of the barony of Barretts, County Cork
- Clogheen, a townland of the barony of Cork, County Cork
- Clogheen, a townland of the barony of Fermoy, County Cork
- Clogheen, a townland of the barony of Kinalea, County Cork
- Clogheen, County Kildare, two townlands of County Kildare
- Clogheen, County Tipperary
- Clogheen, County Waterford, a townland of County Waterford
