= Ballycastle =

Ballycastle may refer to:

- Ballycastle, County Antrim, a small town in Northern Ireland
- Ballycastle, County Mayo, a village in the Republic of Ireland
- Ballycastle Castle, in the County Antrim town
