= Ballymore =

Ballymore may refer to:

== Places ==
=== Northern Ireland ===
- Ballymore, County Armagh, a civil parish and townland in County Armagh
- Ballymore, County Londonderry, a townland in County Londonderry

=== Republic of Ireland ===
- Ballymore, County Cork, a village on Great Island, Cork Harbour
- Ballymore, County Donegal, a townland in Glencolumbkille civil parish
- Ballymore Eustace, town in County Kildare often shortened to "Ballymore"
- Ballymore (civil parish), County Westmeath
  - Ballymore, County Westmeath, a village and townland in Ballymore civil parish, barony of Rathconrath
- Ballymore, County Wexford, two townlands in County Wexford
- Ballymore Castle, in Lawrencetown, County Galway, Republic of Ireland

=== Australia ===
- Ballymore Stadium, Australia

== Other uses ==
- Ballymore Group, an Irish–based property company
- Ballymore (horse)

== See also ==
- Ballimore, a village in New South Wales, Australia
- Balmore, Scotland
