= Mullaghmore =

Mullaghmore may refer to the following places in Ireland:

== General ==
- Mullaghmore, County Clare, a limestone hill
- Mullaghmore Peninsula, a peninsula in County Sligo
  - Mullaghmore, County Sligo, a village on the Mullaghmore Peninsula
- Mullaghmore, County Londonderry, a hill in the Sperrin Mountains near Draperstown
- Mullaghmore, Tullyhunco, a townland
- Mullaghmore, Templeport, a townland

== Townlands in the Republic of Ireland ==
- List of townlands in County Cavan (4 townlands called "Mullaghmore", in the baronies of Tullyhunco, Tullyhaw, and Castlerahan (2) )
- List of townlands of the barony of West Carbery (W.D.) in County Cork
- List of townlands in County Galway (4 townlands called "Mullaghmore North", "Mullaghmore South", "Mullaghmore East", and "Mullaghmore West")
- List of townlands in County Laois
- List of townlands in County Leitrim (2 townlands called "Mullaghmore")
- List of townlands in County Meath (1 townland called "Mullaghmore" and one called "Allerstown" or "Mullaghmore")
- List of townlands in County Monaghan (3 townlands called "Mullaghmore", in the baronies of Trough, Dartree, and Monaghan; and 3 townlands called "Mullaghmore North", "Mullaghmore East", and "Mullaghmore West")
- List of townlands in County Roscommon

== Townlands in Northern Ireland ==
- List of townlands in County Armagh
- Mullaghmore, County Down, a townland in County Down
- List of townlands in County Fermanagh
- List of townlands in County Londonderry (1 townland called "Mullaghmore" and one called "Mullaghmore Glebe")
- List of townlands in County Tyrone (6 townlands called "Mullaghmore", in the baronies of Omagh East (2), Strabane Upper, Dungannon Middle, and Clogher (2); and 3 townlands called "Mullaghmore Glebe", "Mullaghmore East", and "Mullaghmore West")
