= Hellvik =

Village in Eigersund Municipality, Norway

- Village
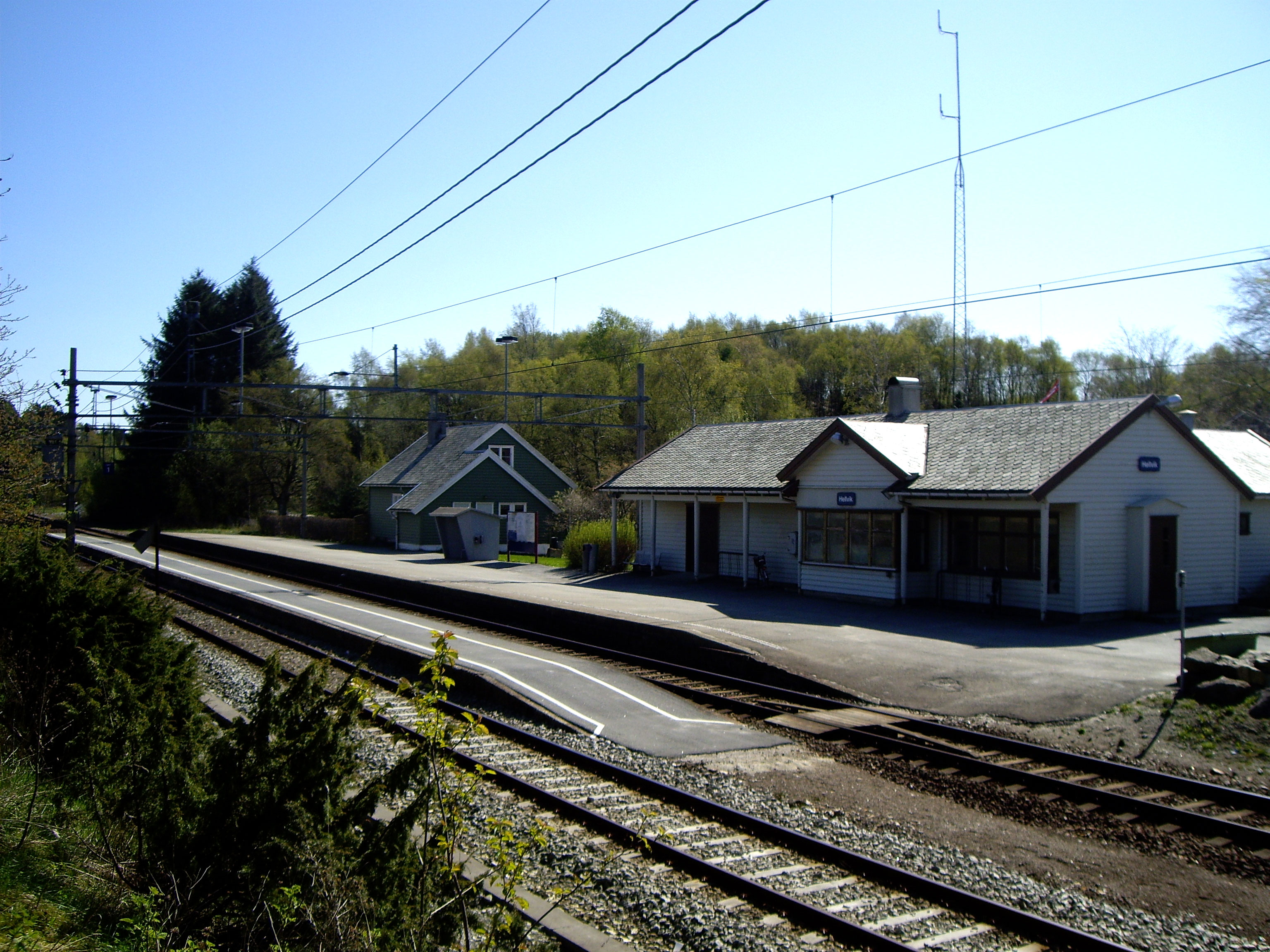
- View of the village rail station
- Interactive map of Hellvik
- Coordinates: 58.47818°N 5.8782°E
- Country: Norway
- Region: Western Norway
- County: Rogaland
- District: Dalane
- Municipality: Eigersund Municipality

Area
  - Total: 0.75 km^{2} (0.29 sq mi)
- Elevation: 12 m (39 ft)

Population (2025)
  - Total: 909
  - Density: 1,212/km^{2} (3,140/sq mi)
- Time zone: UTC+01:00 (CET)
  - Summer (DST): UTC+02:00 (CEST)
- Post Code: 4375 Hellvik

Hellvik is a village in Eigersund Municipality in Rogaland county, Norway. The village is located near the western border of Eigersund, about 5 kilometres (3.1 mi) east of Sirevåg in neighboring Hå Municipality and about 12 kilometres (7.5 mi) west of the town of Egersund.

The 0.75-square-kilometre (190-acre) village has a population (2025) of 909 and a population density of 1,212 inhabitants per square kilometre (3,140/sq mi).

The village has a good natural harbour and is a popular location for holiday houses. There is a school and a kindergarten. The biggest employer in Hellvik is Hellvik Hus, which produces houses all over Norway. Hellvik's A-level soccer team plays in the 5th division of Norway.

The Sørlandet Line (historically called the Jæren Line) runs through the village, with the Jæren Commuter Rail stopping at Hellvik Station.
