= Corlat =

Townland in County Monaghan, Ireland

Corlat Corr Leacht
- Townland
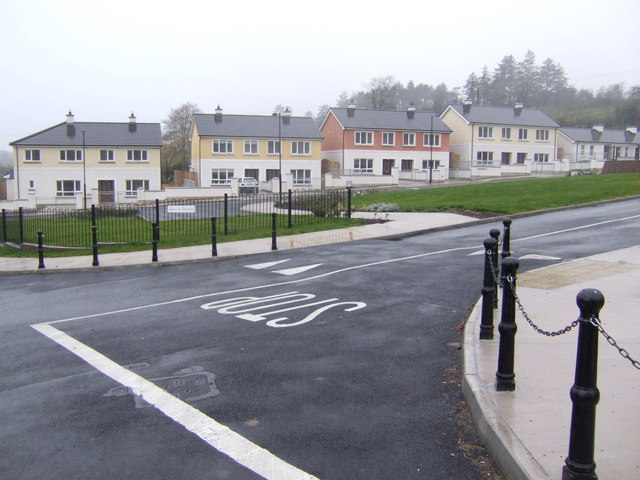
- New houses in Corlat

- Location in Ireland
- Coordinates: 54°18′22″N 7°08′00″W
- Country: (Republic of Ireland) Ireland
- Province: Ulster
- County: County Monaghan
- Time zone: UTC+0 (WET)
  - Summer (DST): UTC-1 (IST (WEST))

Corlat (Irish: Corr Leacht) or Corlatt is a townland in the north of County Monaghan in Ireland, being located in the parish of Tydavnet. The Church of Ireland parish church is located in the village of Tydavnet itself. Corlat is often referred to as part of Knockatallon, which is an adjacent townland. Corlat is situated entirely on foothills of the Sliabh Beagh mountains.

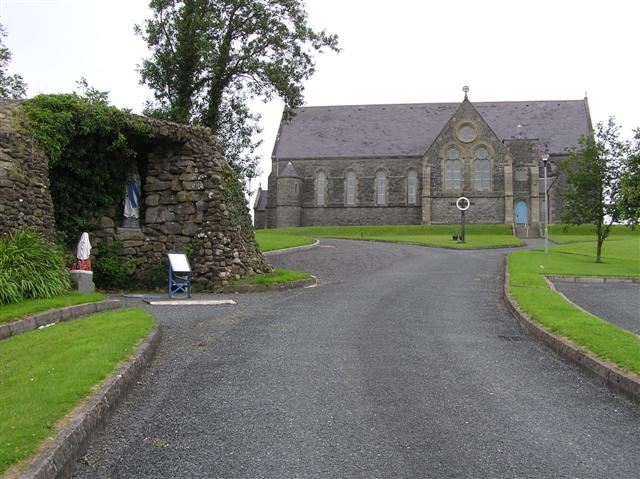
St. Joseph's Church

It is the location of one of the three Catholic chapels in the parish, erected in 1887, was the last of the three to be erected, and the only one not to have a cemetery. The chapel here is known locally as Knockatallon Chapel, taking its name from a larger neighbouring townland to the south, but is officially called St. Joseph's Church.

On 1 April 1990, a monument to Provisional Irish Republican Army volunteer Séamus McElwaine was erected in Corlat.

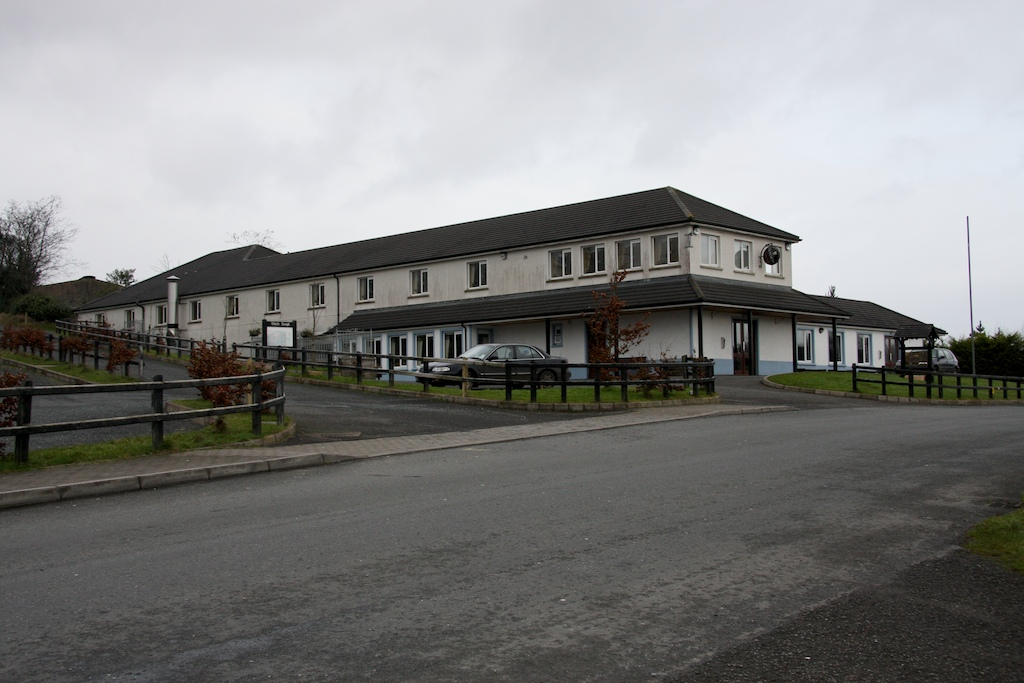
Sliabh Beagh Hotel

Corlat has been somewhat revived in the late 1990s with the building of The Sliabh Beagh Hotel and Tourism Centre, on the site of the original Lady of Fatima Community Hall. It was officially opened on 29 November 2001 by then Taoiseach Bertie Ahern. The centre is used to help drive tourism to the region, and also provides a staging point for many local walking routes, including the Sliabh Beagh Way.
