= Sheskin =

Sheskin An Seisceann
- Townland
- Location in Ireland
- Coordinates: 54°17′12″N 7°06′46″W
- Country: Ireland
- Province: Ulster
- County: Monaghan

Area
  - Total: 1.68753913 km^{2} (0.65156250 sq mi)
- Elevation: 306 m (1,004 ft)
- Time zone: UTC+0 (WET)
  - Summer (DST): UTC-1 (IST (WEST))

Sheskin (Irish: An Seisceann), traditionally divided into Sheskinmor and Sheskinbeg, is a townland in the north of County Monaghan in Ireland. It is in the foothills of Sliabh Beagh. Sheskin is part of the civil parish of Tydavnet, situated about 3 miles from the village of Scotstown and about 8 miles from Monaghan town. Sheskin is straddled in the east by the River Blackwater and in the south by one of its tributaries, which converge at the south eastern corner of the townland.

Other townlands and places in Ireland have the same name, or similar derivatives. The name derives from the Irish Gaelic word for marsh, and refers to the significant area of blanket bog within the townland.

== History ==
There is no evidence of Ring forts or other early historic remains in Sheskin. Like most of the uplands, it is not thought to have been permanently inhabited through the Middle Ages. In the 17th century, as the Ulster Plantation got underway, Sheskin and the other uplands were common lands for the lower lying districts around Scotstown, and so would have been cleared, but have remained fairly open. In the 18th century, land would have started to be allocated to tenants, and so the process of enclosing parcels into fields would have begun. One of the earliest records being the Griffith Land Valuation of 1860, which lists the landowner for Sheskin as Miss H Westenra, and she had 23 tenants at this time

Sheskin is one of the larger townlands of the civil parish of Tydavnet, which reflects the poorer land quality. Sheskin would have been classified as a townland during the Ulster Plantation in the 17th century, and probably would have been assigned from a previously existing tate of the same name and geographic area. Tate was a local term for an area of land, used in Monaghan, which was typically smaller than ploughlands which were used elsewhere, and so resulted in smaller townlands on average than in other counties.

Famine Stone Located at the bottom on the Black Hill, Sheskin 54.285584°N 7.109506°W

It is understood that Sheskin is the location where Potato blight was first identified in Monaghan, the disease that ultimately led to the Irish Famine. Tradition has it that the blight was noticed on the Gunn Family's potatoes by an Anne Murphy in the Autumn of 1845. An Owen Gunn is marked as tenant in 1860, but no Murphy's were known to reside in Sheskin. This event is now commemorated by the famine stone located at the bottom of the Black Hill, in the south east of the townland. In Monaghan alone anywhere from 20-30% of the population would ultimately die during the famine. Although the upland districts of the north were not as badly hit as the south of county Monaghan, the Parish of Tydavent did have a population of 11600 in 1841, and 8,400 in 1851. Corblonog, the townland just to the east of Sheskin, still has a location known as Porridge Hill, where the Williamson family provided gruel to those who needed it during the famine.

In the first half of the 20th century, a field at the top of the Black Hill served as homeground for the Knockatallon Gaelic football team at 54.286974°N 7.114334°W. A hedge school was also located on Gunn's lane in what is now known as Brady's Field, located at 54.286723°N 7.112875°W, named after one of the teachers. It was described as a 'rough hut with stones for seats'. Sheskin is on record as having a blacksmith in 1938. Electricity was first introduced to Sheskin in 1948.

Sheskin was the location of Killycarnan National School, a two classroom building, before it was closed in the 1980s and the students relocated to either Knockatallon National School or Urbleshanny National School in Scotstown. The school has now been renovated into a private residence. The name Killycarnan comes from the name of another townland adjacent to Sheskin and the site of a previous national school which pre-dated the Sheskin school.
