= Tydavnet =

Village in County Monaghan, Ireland

Tydavnet Tigh Damhnata Tedavnet
- Village
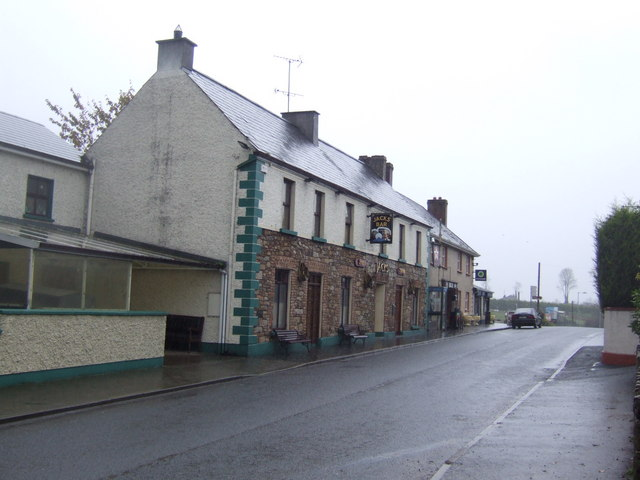
- Pub in Tydavnet

- Location in Ireland
- Coordinates: 54°17′45″N 7°00′56″W
- Country: Ireland
- Province: Ulster
- County: County Monaghan
- Time zone: UTC+0 (WET)
  - Summer (DST): UTC+1 (IST (WEST))

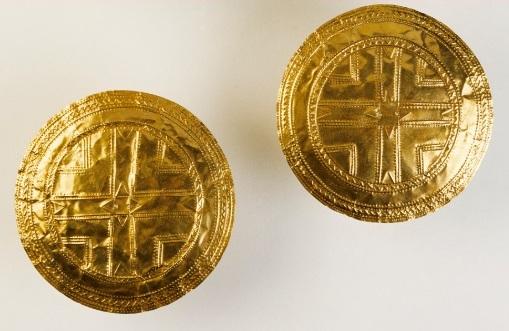
Atlantic Bronze Age gold discs discovered at Tydavnet, County Monaghan

Tydavnet, officially Tedavnet (Irish: Tigh Damhnata, meaning 'house of Damhnait'), is a village in northern County Monaghan, Ireland, and also the name of the townland and civil parish in which the village sits. Both the Church of Ireland and Catholic church have Tydavnet named as a parish and in both cases, the geographical area is almost identical. The village is located on the R186 regional road.

== History ==
=== Bronze Age gold ===
Evidence of ancient settlement in the area includes the Atlantic Bronze Age Tydavnet gold discs. Dating from circa 2100 BC, these discs were discovered in the roots of an old tree. Raised lines, rows of dots and zig-zags produce a central cross surrounded by concentric patterns, were used to decorate the discs. The techniques of repoussé, punching and polishing, and doming of the surfaces are not seen on other similar discs. The pair of discs are on permanent display in the National Museum of Ireland.

=== Foundation and name ===
The Irish name of the townland and village, Irish: Tigh Damhnata, meaning 'house of Damhnait', derives from the area's association with the 6th-century Irish saint, Saint Damnat. (Note: Other texts associate the area with a different saint, Saint Dymphna, who -whilst fleeing to Belgium to escape her pagan father's wrath- is said to have stopped in Tydavnet.)) Damnat is thought to have founded a church in the area, which is generally considered to have been located in the graveyard of the current village Catholic church. This church, St. Dympna's Church, was originally erected in 1730, then rebuilt in the early 1900s and the interior renovated in the 1990s. It is one of the three existing Catholic churches in the parish. The other two churches are located in Corlat, and in Urbleshanny, near Scotstown.

In 1206, the Normans plundered Tydavnet. In 1302, a taxation list was the first recorded mention of the area.

== Transport ==
Local Link bus route M1 links the village with Monaghan several times daily from Mondays to Saturdays inclusive.

== Amenities and education ==
St. Dymphna's National School is a national (primary) school situated on the north end of the village.

Tydavnet Community Centre, originally a school, is now used to host local events, local elections and drama. Tydavnet Village Community Centre Limited is partially funded by National Lottery funding.

As of 2021, planning permission was granted for 13 houses in Tydavnet, including three-bedroom detached homes, and four-bedroom detached homes, opposite the community centre.

Tydavnet has two public houses

== Sport ==
Scotstown GAA, the local Gaelic Athletic Association (GAA) club is primarily involved in Gaelic football. Although the team represents the entire parish of Tydavnet the club is named after one of the townland's villages, Scotstown. Páirc Mhuire, Scotstown is the home field of Scotstown GAA, with one full size field and two smaller fields.

== Awards and twinning ==
Tydavnet was a "Pride of Place Award" winner (in the 750–1500 to population category) in 2014. The village also previously won Monaghan County Council's "Tidy Towns" competition.

The village is linked with Geel in Belgium, which also has a reputed connection to Saint Dymphna. Tydavnet/Monaghan and Geel were officially twinned in 1992.

== Notable people ==
- Caitriona Balfe, actress and model, known for the Outlander television series, grew up in Tydavnet.
- Terry Cavanagh, creator of computer games such as VVVVVV and Don't Look Back, was born in Tydavnet.
- Gerry McCarville, Gaelic footballer
