= Smith =

Smith may refer to:

== Occupations ==
- Metalsmith, or simply smith, a craftsman fashioning tools or works of art out of various metals

== People ==
- Smith (given name)
- Smith (surname), a family name originating in England
  - List of people with surname Smith, including fictional characters
- Smith (artist) (born 1985), French visual artist

== Arts and entertainment ==
- Smith (band), an American rock band 1969–1971
- Smith (EP), by Tokyo Police Club, 2007
- Smith (play), a 1909 play by W. Somerset Maugham
- Smith (1917 film), a British silent film based on the play
- Smith (1939 film), a short film
- Smith!, a 1969 Disney Western film
- Smith (TV series), a 2006 American drama
- Smith, a 1932 novel by Warwick Deeping
- Smith, a 1967 novel by Leon Garfield and a 1970 TV adaptation

== Places ==
=== On Earth ===
==== North America ====
- Smith, Indiana, U.S.
- Smith, Kentucky, U.S.
- Smith, Nevada, U.S.
- Smith, South Carolina, U.S.
- Smith Village, Oklahoma, U.S.
- Smith Park (Middletown, Connecticut), U.S., a public park
- Smith Pool, Salem, Massachusetts, U.S.
- Smith Peak
- Smith, Alberta, Canada
- Smith Sound, between Greenland and Canada
- Smith Sound, Newfoundland and Labrador, Canada
- Smith Sound (British Columbia), Canada
- Smith County (disambiguation)
- Smith Township (disambiguation)
- Fort Smith (disambiguation)

==== Antarctica ====
- Smith Bluffs, Ellsworth Land
- Smith Cliff, Ellsworth Land
- Smith Glacier, Marie Byrd Land
- Smith Heights, Oates Land
- Smith Islands, Wilkes Land
- Smith Knob, Ellsworth Land
- Smith Nunatak, Mac. Robertson Land
- Smith Nunataks, two nunataks in Palmer Land
- Smith Peaks, Mac. Robertson Land
- Smith Peninsula, Palmer Land
- Smith Ridge, Ellsworth Land
- Smith Rocks, Mac. Robertson Land
- Mount Smith, north of Mawson Glacier, Scott Coast

==== Other places ====
- Smith, Buenos Aires, Carlos Casares Partido, Argentina
- Smith Volcano, Philippines

=== In space ===
- Smith (lunar crater), on the Moon
- Smith (Martian crater), on Mars

== Businesses and organisations ==
- Smith (advertising agency), an American advertising agency
- N.F. Smith & Associates, American electronic distributor
- Smith Automobile Company, an early US automobile manufacturing company 1902–1912
- Smith's Bank, a British bank
- Smith Electric Vehicles, a manufacturer of electric trucks
- Smith International, a gas and oil industry services company, now merged with Schlumberger
- Smith's Food and Drug, an American grocery chain
- The Smith's Snackfood Company, an Australian snack food company owned by PepsiCo
- WHSmith, or Smith's, a British retailer
- DS Smith, a British packaging manufacturer
- SmithGroup, an international architectural, engineering and planning firm
- Smiths Group, a British engineering company
- Smith College, in Northampton, Massachusetts, U.S.

== Other uses ==
- Smith Act, a US federal statute
- Smith Tower, in Seattle, Washington, U.S.

== See also ==
- Smiths (disambiguation)
- Smithfield (disambiguation)
- Smithland (disambiguation)
- Smithville (disambiguation)
- Smithers (disambiguation)
- Smith Center (disambiguation)
- Smyth, a surname
- R. v. Smith, the name of several court cases
- Smith Square, in Westminster, London, England
