= Smith Township, Indiana =

Smith Township, Indiana may refer to one of the following places:

- Smith Township, Greene County, Indiana
- Smith Township, Posey County, Indiana
- Smith Township, Whitley County, Indiana

See also

- Smith Township (disambiguation)
