= Smithfield Township, Pennsylvania =

Smithfield Township is the name of some places in the U.S. state of Pennsylvania:

- Smithfield Township, Bradford County, Pennsylvania
- Smithfield Township, Huntingdon County, Pennsylvania
- Smithfield Township, Monroe County, Pennsylvania

== See also ==
- Middle Smithfield Township, Monroe County, Pennsylvania
- Smithfield, Pennsylvania, a borough in Fayette County
- Smithfield Township (disambiguation)
