= Smith Family =

Smith Family may refer to:

- Smith family (Latter Day Saints), American family with many members prominent in religion and politics
- Smith family (Sierra Leone), Creole family of Sierra Leone
- Smith family (bankers), English banking family founded by Thomas Smith (1631–1699)
- The Smith Family (charity), Australian, independent non-profit children's charity
- The Smith Family (TV series) (1971–1972), American television series, starring Henry Fonda
- Smith family, fictional family of American Dad!
- Smith family, fictional family of EastEnders, introduced in 1985 with Mary Smith
- Smith family, fictional family of EastEnders, introduced in 2002 with Gus Smith
- Smith family, fictional family of Rick and Morty

== See also ==
- List of people with surname Smith
- Smiths (disambiguation)
- Smith (disambiguation)
- Smith (surname)
- The Smiths, rock band
