= Fort C. F. Smith =

Fort C. F. Smith may refer to:

- Fort C. F. Smith (Bowling Green, Kentucky), listed on the U.S. National Register of Historic Places (NRHP)
- Fort C. F. Smith (Fort Smith, Montana), NRHP-listed
- Fort C. F. Smith (Arlington, Virginia), NRHP-listed

== See also ==
- Fort C. F. Smith Historic District (disambiguation)
