= Smithfield =

Smithfield may refer to:

== Places ==
=== Australia ===
- Electoral district of Smithfield, a former electoral district of the New South Wales Legislative Assembly
- Smithfield, New South Wales, a suburb of Sydney
  - Smithfield West, a locality
- Smithfield, Queensland, a northern suburb of Cairns
- Smithfield, South Australia, a northern suburb of Adelaide
  - Smithfield railway station, Adelaide
- Smithfield Memorial Park, in Evanston South, South Australia
- Smithfield State High School

=== Canada ===
- Smithfield, Toronto, a neighbourhood of Toronto

=== Hong Kong ===
- Smithfield, Hong Kong, a road

=== Ireland ===
- Smithfield, Dublin

=== New Zealand ===
- Smithfield, New Zealand, industrial suburb of Timaru

=== South Africa ===
- Smithfield, Free State

=== South America ===
- Smithfield, Suriname

=== United Kingdom ===
- Smithfield, Cumbria
- Smithfield, London (sometimes referred to as West Smithfield)
  - Smithfield Market
- East Smithfield, London
- Smithfield, Birmingham
- Smithfield Market Hall, Manchester

=== United States ===
- Smithfield, a city neighborhood in Ensley, Birmingham, Alabama
- Smithfield, Illinois
- Smithfield, Indiana
- Smithfield, Kentucky
- Smithfield, Maine
- Smithfield, Missouri
- Smithfield, Nebraska
- Smithfield, New York
- Smithfield, North Carolina
  - West Smithfield, North Carolina
- Smithfield, Ohio
- Smithfield, Pennsylvania
  - Smithfield Street Bridge
- Smithfield, Rhode Island
- Smithfield, Texas
- Smithfield, Utah
- Smithfield, Virginia
- Smithfield (Blacksburg, Virginia), listed on the NRHP in Montgomery County, Virginia
- Smithfield (Rosedale, Virginia), listed on the NRHP in Russell County, Virginia
- Smithfield, West Virginia
- Smithfield, the former name of Middleway, West Virginia
- Smithfield Township (disambiguation), a number of townships
- Smithfield, U.S. Virgin Islands

== Other uses ==
- Smithfield (dog), a shaggy type of collie dog used for herding cattle
- Smithfield ham, a type of country ham
- Smithfield Foods, a meat processing company
- "Smithfield", the Pentium D processor's first generation codename
- Smithfield Plantation (disambiguation)
- Smithfield's Chicken 'N Bar-B-Q
