= Smithfield, Hong Kong =

Street in Kennedy Town, Hong Kong

Coordinates: 22.280535°N 114.129137°E

Smithfield
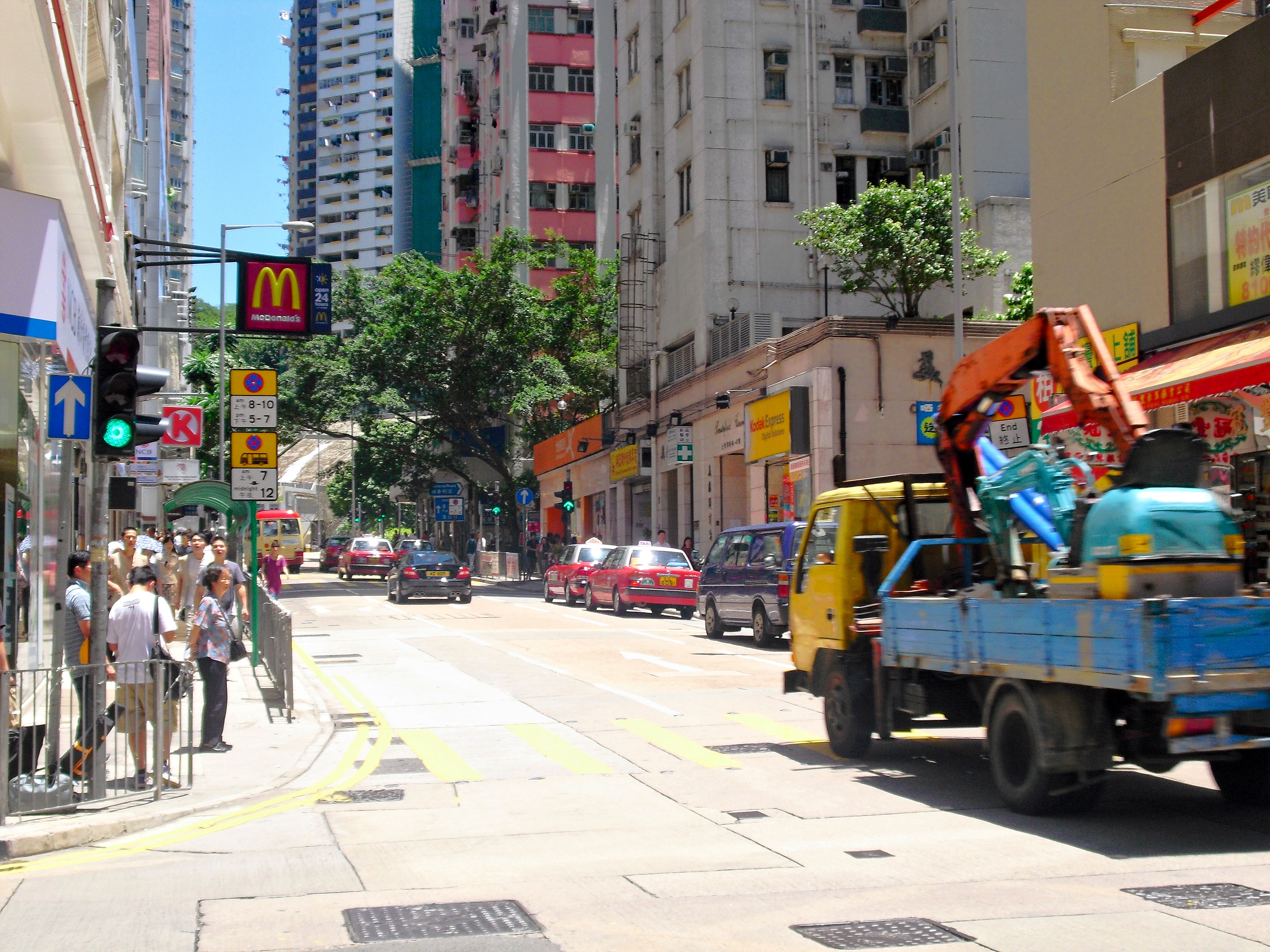
- Northern section of Smithfield, looking south.
- Interactive map of Smithfield
- Length: 1.38 km (0.86 mi); 1.10 km (0.68 mi) two-way, 0.28 km (0.17 mi) one-way
- South end: Pok Fu Lam Road / Mount Davis Road
- North end: New Praya Kennedy Town / Shing Sai Road

Smithfield, Hong Kong
- Chinese: 士美菲路
Transcriptions
Standard Mandarin
- Hanyu Pinyin: Shìměifēilù
Yue: Cantonese
- Yale Romanization: Sih méih fēi louh
- Jyutping: Si6 mei5 fei1 lou6

Alternative Chinese name
- Chinese: 士美非路
Transcriptions
Standard Mandarin
- Hanyu Pinyin: Shìměifēilù
Yue: Cantonese
- Yale Romanization: Sih méih fēi louh
- Jyutping: Si6 mei5 fei1 lou6

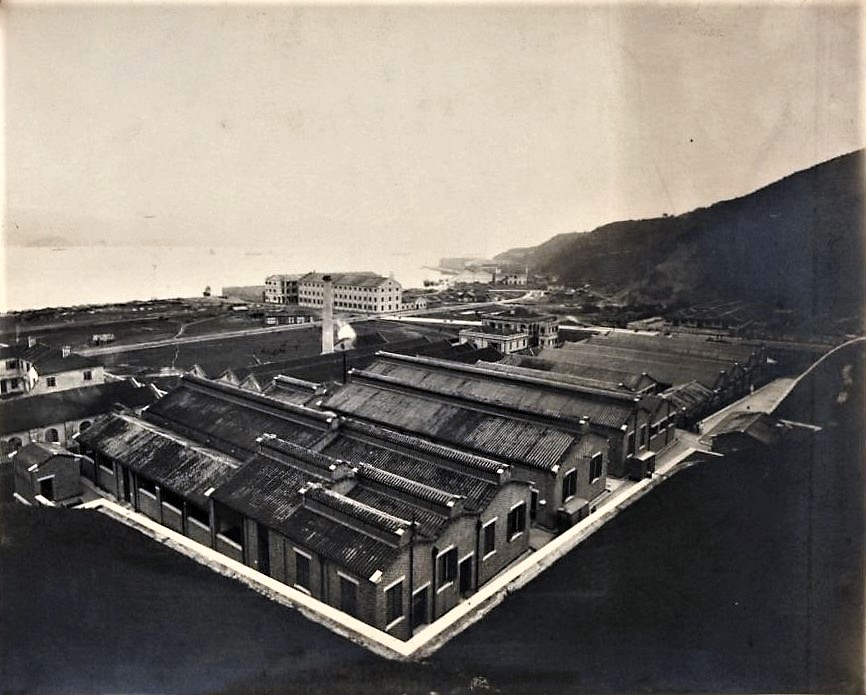
Kennedy Town Slaughterhouses and pig and sheep depots in 1894.

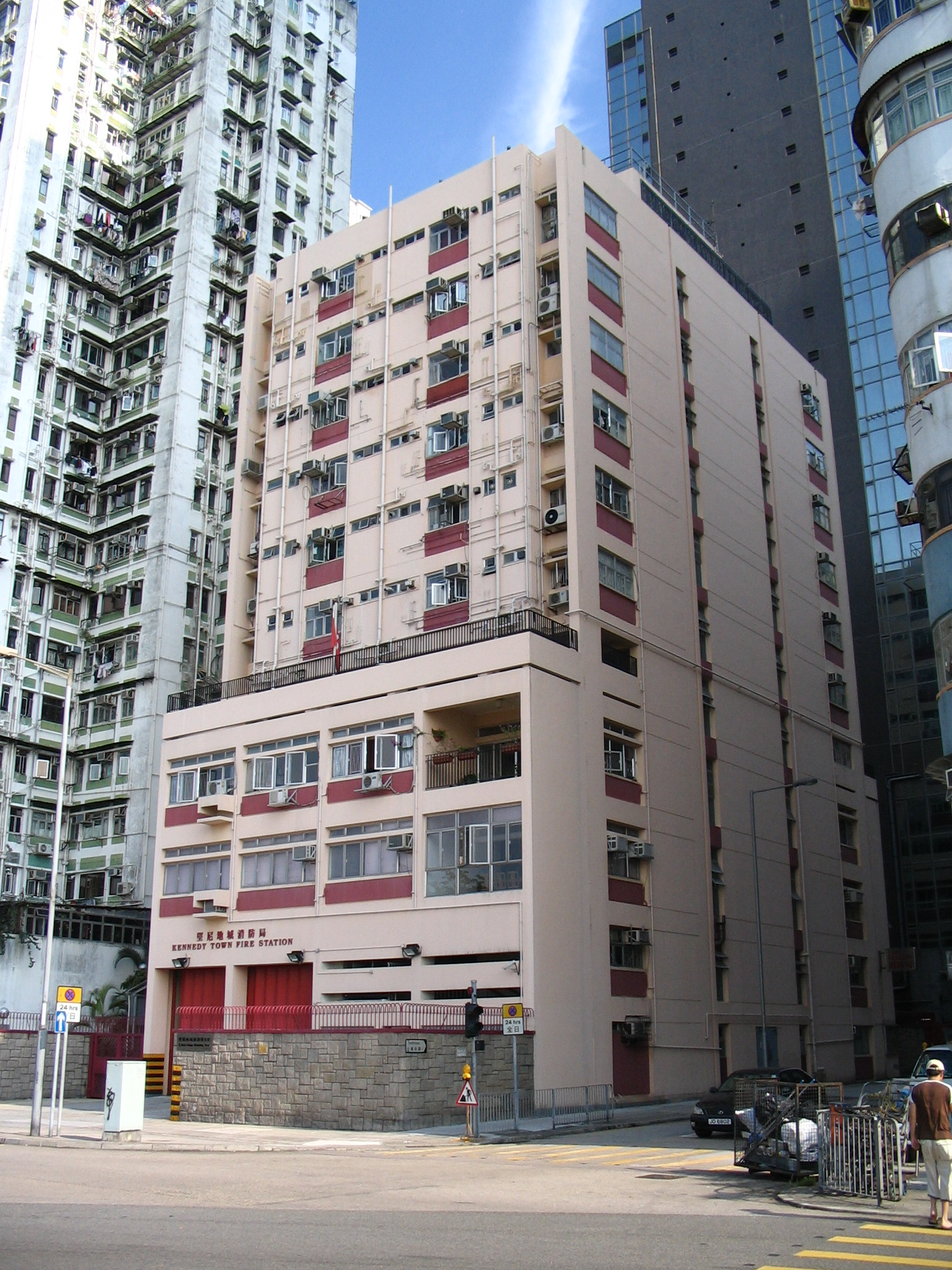
Kennedy Town Fire Station, at the northern end of Smithfield, on the corner with New Praya, Kennedy Town.

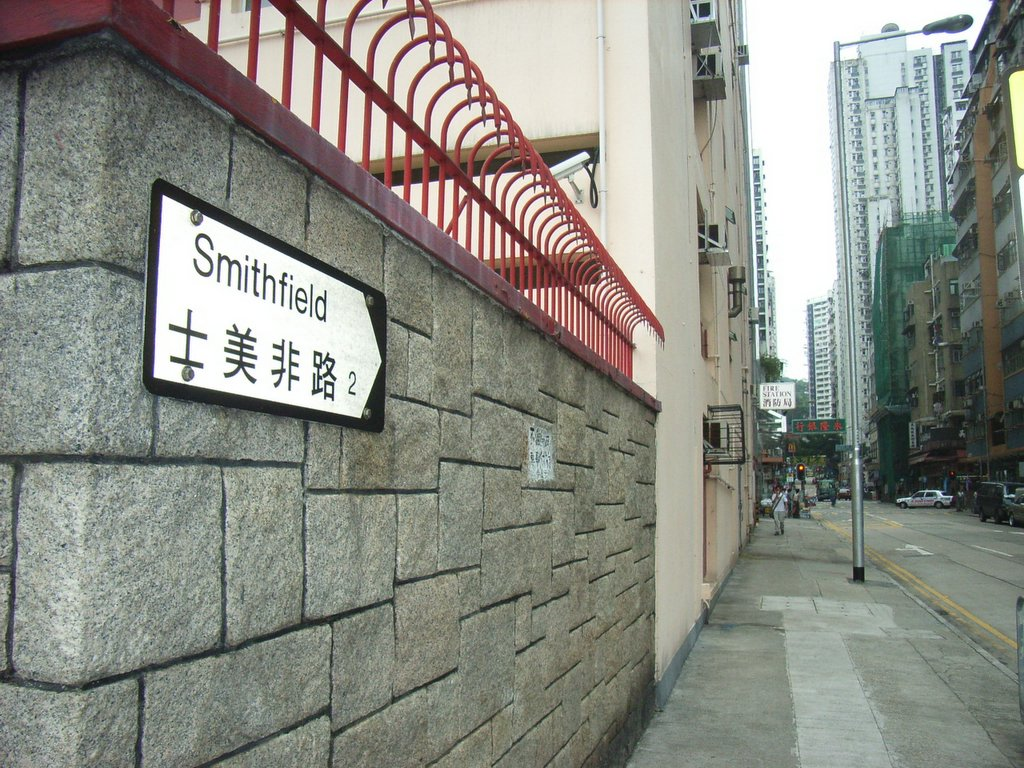
The north end of Smithfield

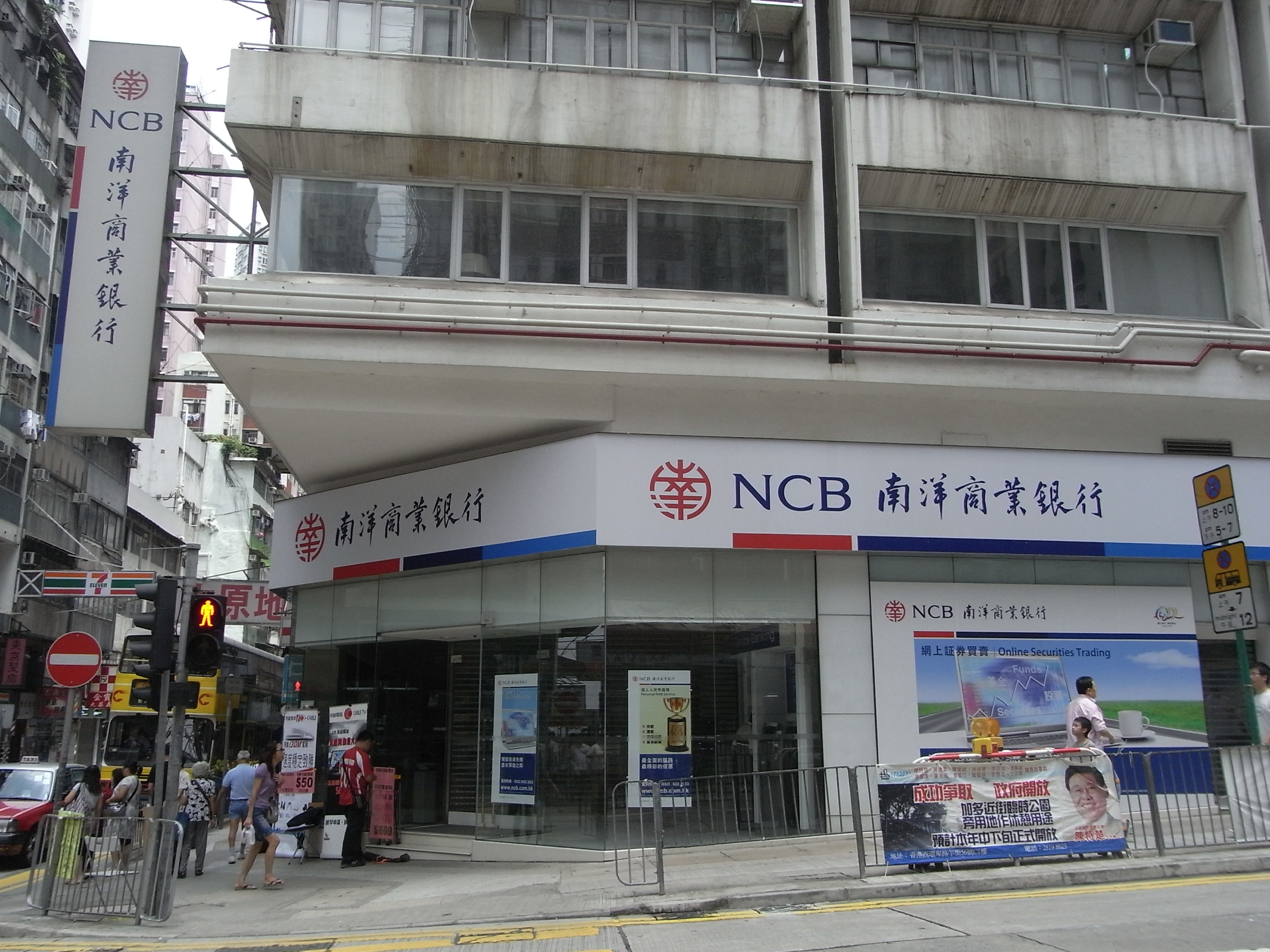
Branch of the Nanyang Commercial Banking in the Nan Sang Building (南生大廈), on the corner of Smithfield and Belcher's Street, in 2010.

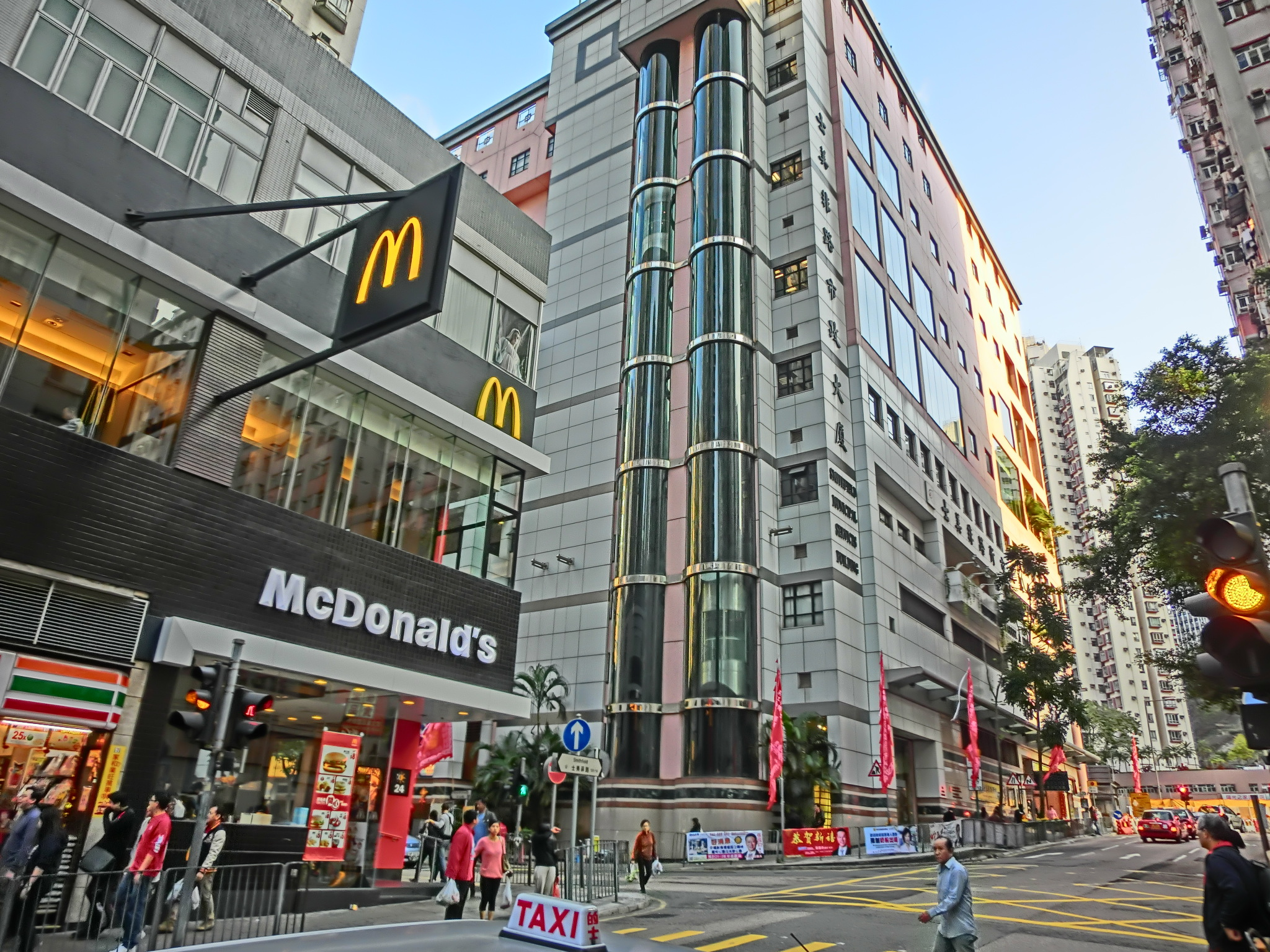
North section of Smithfield, looking south, with Smithfield Municipal Services Building in the centre.

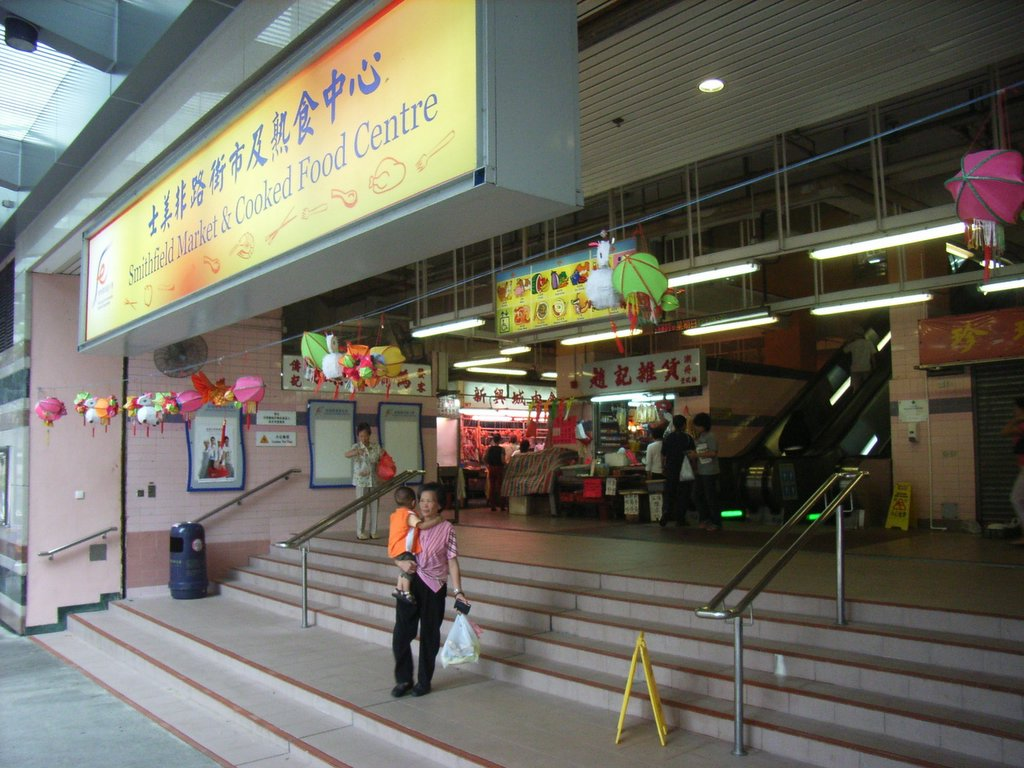
Entrance of Smithfield Market & Cooked Food Centre in Smithfield

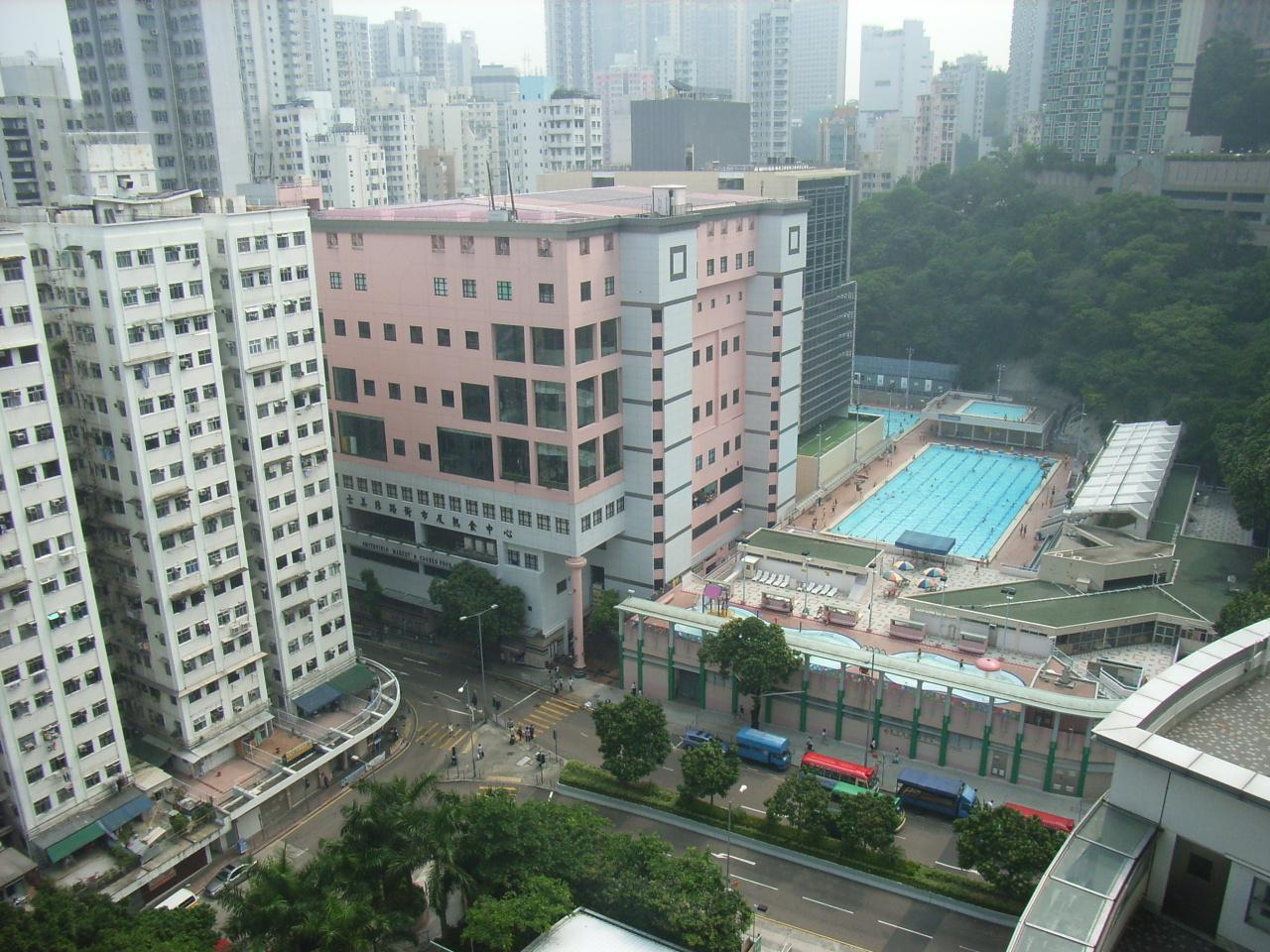
View of Smithfield, Smithfield Municipal Services Building, and the former Kennedy Town Swimming Pool

Smithfield is a street with a length of approximately 1,300 m in Kennedy Town, Hong Kong Island. It runs from north to south; its northern section is a commercial and residential area, whilst its southern section is a road connecting it to Pok Fu Lam Road. Smithfield was historically the site of a cattle quarantine depot and a slaughterhouse, and was probably named after its London namesake.

== Location ==
The street begins at New Praya, Kennedy Town (堅彌地城新海旁) in Belcher Bay, and extends south into Mount Davis. It crosses two of the main streets of Kennedy Town: Catchick Street (吉席街) and Belcher's Street. To the south, Smithfield forms T-junctions with Rock Hill Street (石山街), Forbes Street (科士街), Pokfield Road, and Lung Wah Street (龍華街). It ends at the junction with Pok Fu Lam Road and Mount Davis Road (摩星嶺道).

== Features ==
Notable buildings and landmarks include:

- Smithfield Municipal Services Building (士美非路市政大廈), located at 12K Smithfield. It houses the Smithfield Sports Centre, Smithfield Market and Smithfield Public Library. The fourth floor of the library contains a study corner for school students. There are separate entrances to each of the building's facilities, and the market is segregated from the library and the indoor games hall.
- Kennedy Town MTR station (opened on 28 December 2014)
- Kwun Lung Lau, built in 1967, it was one of the first public housing developments in Hong Kong.
- Kennedy Town Fire Station, located at the northern end of Smithfield, on the corner of New Praya, Kennedy Town.
- Forbes Street Temporary Playground, located at the junction of Forbes Street and Smithfield.
- Kennedy Town Swimming Pool, was formerly located at 12N Smithfield. It was demolished on 20 December 2010 to facilitate the construction of Kennedy Town station.

== History ==
=== Cattle depot ===
The area bound by the present day Rock Hill Street and Pokfield Path (蒲飛徑) was historically the site of a cattle quarantine depot and a slaughterhouse to house and slaughter live cattle when the animals arrived in Hong Kong by ship via the piers in Kennedy Town. The Kennedy Town Slaughterhouse was established in 1894.

Historically, Smithfield was populated by labourers working at the cattle station, and the nearby marketplaces. These have since been cleared to make way for the Forbes Street Temporary Playground (科士街臨時遊樂場), North Street (北街) red minibus terminus, and for the loading and unloading of cargo vessels at the piers of Kennedy Town.

The British novelist Martin Booth wrote in his 2004 autobiographical Gweilo: Memories of a Hong Kong Childhood: "the bellow of a cow in the Kennedy Town abattoir might lift up to me – to be abruptly cut short".

In 1961, the government decided that the slaughterhouse was to be relocated to the Kennedy Town Abattoir on Cadogan Street, and it moved in 1968. Despite calls to convert the original slaughterhouse site into a swimming pool, the government stated in 1969 that the plan was not feasible until both the cattle depot and the former slaughterhouse complex (then occupied by in tandem with the cattle depot) were released for redevelopment. The cattle depot was closed down in 1986, when the government finally decided that it was to be removed. The land was subsequently developed into the Kennedy Town Swimming Pool (堅尼地城游泳池, demolished in December 2010), Smithfield Market (士美非路街市) and the Smithfield Municipal Services Building.

An abattoir and pig depot existed on the opposite side of the southwestern section of Smithfield from the late 19th century until at least 1970.

=== Air raid tunnel ===
At the time of the Battle of Hong Kong in 1941, Smithfield was the site of the No. 9 Air Raid Tunnel.

=== Gasometer ===
On 14 May 1934, a gasometer located in Shek Tong Tsui (formerly known as West Point) exploded, killing 42 people, and injuring 46. Two years later, the Hong Kong and China Gas Company purchased an area of land situated to the south of the cattle depot, and erected a gasometer to replace the ruined one at West Point. The gasometer existed until the early 1980s when it was demolished to make way for the construction of Smithfield Terrace (嘉輝花園) by Henderson Land Development Co. Ltd, the largest shareholder of Hong Kong and China Gas Company.

=== Municipal Services Building ===
Smithfield Municipal Services Building was completed in 1995, and was initially called "The Urban Council Smithfield Complex". The Smithfield Sports Centre inside the building opened in July 1996. The indoor market opened in June 1996 and is divided into three parts, each occupying a separate floor: meat and wet fish market; fruit and vegetable market; cooked food stalls. These retail outlets were previously located in the surrounding streets of Kennedy Town, including the longstanding Smithfield Road Temporary Market, which was a licensed food market, whilst illegal hawkers sold their products at the junction of Smithfield and Belcher's Street.

=== Extension ===
Until the mid-1990s, Smithfield was a cul-de-sac whose terminus was at the junction with Lung Wah Street, on the same latitude as Wah Fai House (華輝大廈), and Mei Wah Mansion (美華大廈). However, Lands Department records show that Ho Chong (何莊; lit. "Farmstead of the Ho family"), a Hotung ancestral family property situated on the hillside beyond the southern tip of the street, has the address "40A Smithfield", and should thus be treated as the original top end of Smithfield.

Construction of a link road connecting Smithfield to Pok Fu Lam Road commenced in February 1995, and was completed three years later: opening to traffic in January 1998. It is referred to as the Smithfield Extension, in order to distinguish it from the original top end of the street adjacent to Lung Wah Street.

== Name ==
Smithfield is one of the few thoroughfares in Hong Kong without a street-type suffix (e.g. "Road", "Street", "Path", "Lane", &c.) Other notable examples are Queensway in Admiralty, Broadway (百老匯街) in Mei Foo, and Glenealy in Mid-Levels.

=== London namesake ===
Smithfield, Hong Kong, was probably named after its London namesake by the British colonial administration. Smithfield, London, is an area in the north-western part of the City of London with a history of over 800 years. It started as an area to house live cattle from the countryside before they were slaughtered and sold at the meat markets in the City of London. Just as was historically the case with its Hong Kong counterpart, Smithfield in London was populated by labourers and traders, who worked at the slaughterhouses, and sold their produce at the nearby marketplaces. Smithfield, London, as a landmark was promoted by literary works such as Charles Dickens' Oliver Twist and Mark Twain's The Prince and the Pauper.

The old cattle stations in both Smithfield, London, and Smithfield, Hong Kong have been consigned to history, to be replaced by a market in their respective cities. Both Smithfields have since been redeveloped to accommodate middle class residents.

=== Name change ===
The street is often erroneously written as Smithfield Road by local residents, affected by the Chinese suffix 路 (lo, lit. road) and in Chinese, 士美非路 was often mistaken as 士美菲路.

On 2 February 2007, the Lands Department proposed to rename Smithfield (士美非路) as Smithfield Road (士美菲路). However, the idea to add the word "Road" was opposed on the basis that the street name was unique in that it was named after – and had a similar historical development to – Smithfield, London. On 18 October 2007, the Government amended the proposal, and announced that only the Chinese name of the street would be changed (from 士美非路 to 士美菲路). The name change became official on 14 December 2007.

== Transportation ==
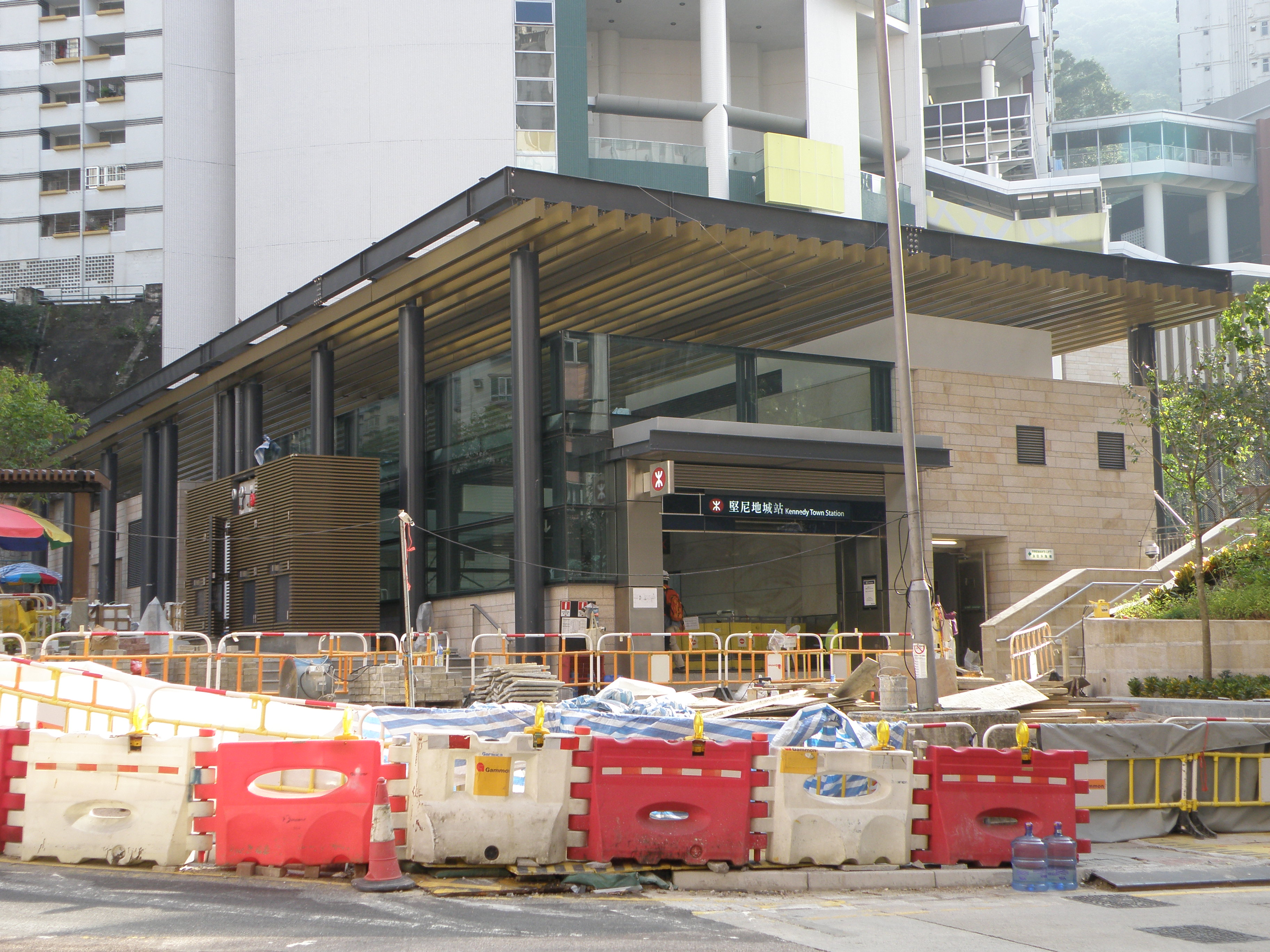
Construction site of Kennedy Town station of the MTR, on Smithfield in 2014. Block D of Kwun Lung Lau is visible in the background.

Smithfield is served by trams, buses, and minibuses. The Kennedy Town station of the MTR rapid transit railway opened to the public on 28 December 2014. It is located beneath the former Kennedy Town Swimming Pool and the Forbes Street Temporary Playground. The station has two exits in Smithfield: "A" on the east side connected to a green minibus terminus, and "C" on the west side next to the playground.

Green minibus routes 12, 13, and 23 use and stop on Smithfield. Routes 58 and 59 were relocated from North Street on 25 December 2014, and route 58M began operating at 7 a.m. on 29 December 2014. The new terminus includes a stop for route 58A to Aberdeen, Hong Kong.

Bus route 43X once ran along Smithfield to travel between Pok Fu Lam Road and Kennedy Town. The bus stop it called at continued to carry the name "Kennedy Town Swimming Pool" after demolition of the pool. The route has since been withdrawn.

In the 1990s, vehicular traffic in Smithfield was considered to be "extremely heavy throughout the day". Consequently, the vehicular entrance to the Smithfield Municipal Services Building (completed in 1995) was assigned to Rock Hill Street.

== Intersections ==
=== Two-way road section ===
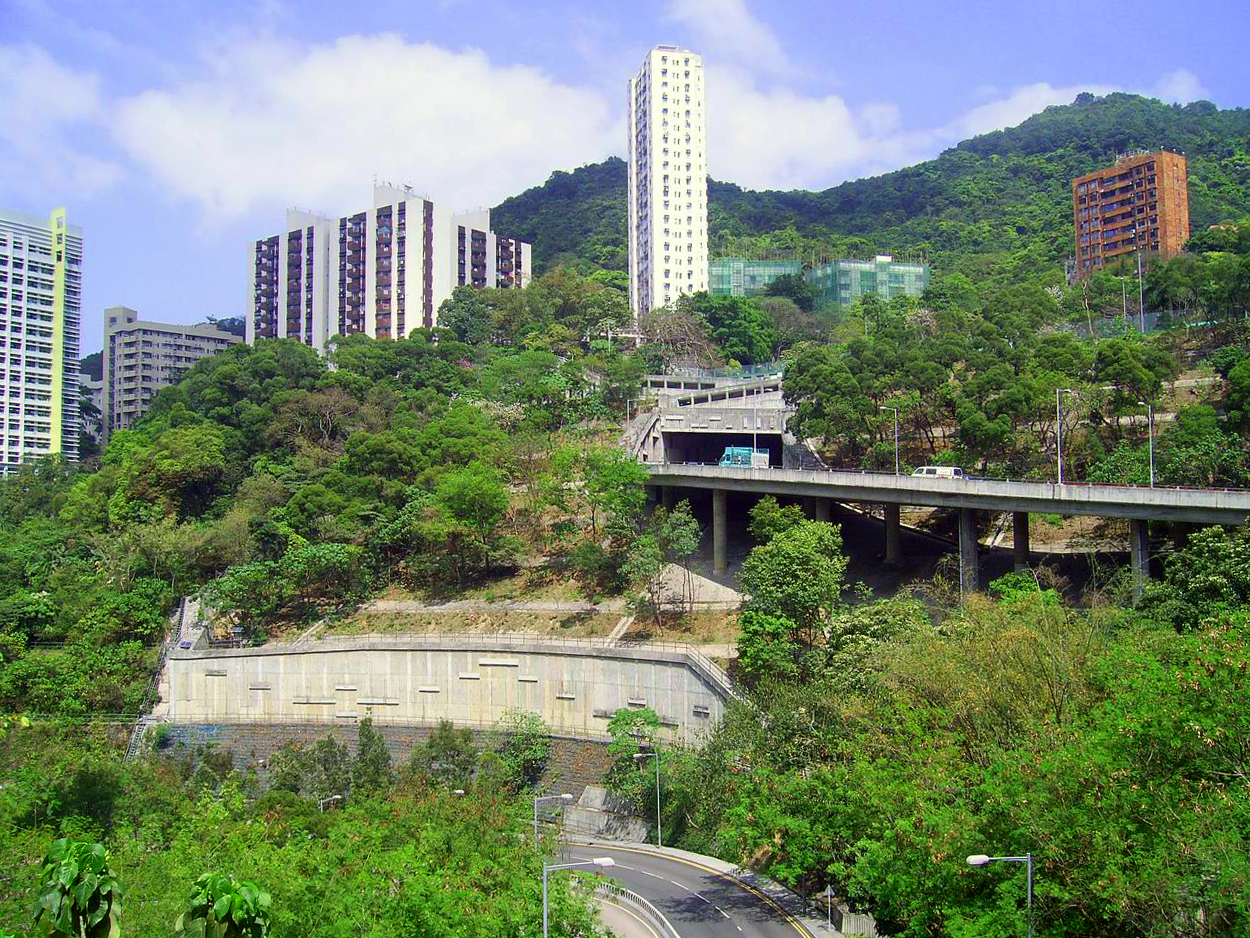
Southern section of Smithfield (elevated road).

Listed from south to north. The entire road is in Kennedy Town, Central and Western District.

km	mi	Destinations	Notes
0.00	0.00	Pok Fu Lam Road / Mount Davis Road	Southern terminus
0.80	0.50	Smithfield to Lung Wah Street	
0.87	0.54	Pokfield Road	
1.10	0.68	Forbes Street	End two-way road
1.000 mi = 1.609 km; 1.000 km = 0.621 mi

=== One-way road section ===
Listed from north to south. The entire road is in Kennedy Town, Central and Western District.

km	mi	Destinations	Notes
0.00	0.00	New Praya Kennedy Town / Shing Sai Road	Northern terminus
0.08	0.050	Catchick Street	
0.12	0.075	Hau Wo Street	
0.16	0.099	Belcher's Street	
0.23	0.14	Rock Hill Street	
0.28	0.17	Forbes Street	End one-way road
1.000 mi = 1.609 km; 1.000 km = 0.621 mi

== See also ==
- List of streets and roads in Hong Kong
- Sheung Shui Slaughterhouse

Other places named "Smithfield (disambiguation)"

- With origin as a marketplace:
  - Smithfield, London, United Kingdom (sometimes referred to as West Smithfield)
  - Smithfield, Birmingham, United Kingdom
  - Smithfield, Dublin, Ireland
- As a thoroughfare (i.e., a road or street):
  - East Smithfield, London, United Kingdom
