= Sai Wan =

Area in Hong Kong Island

Coordinates: 22.285°N 114.132°E

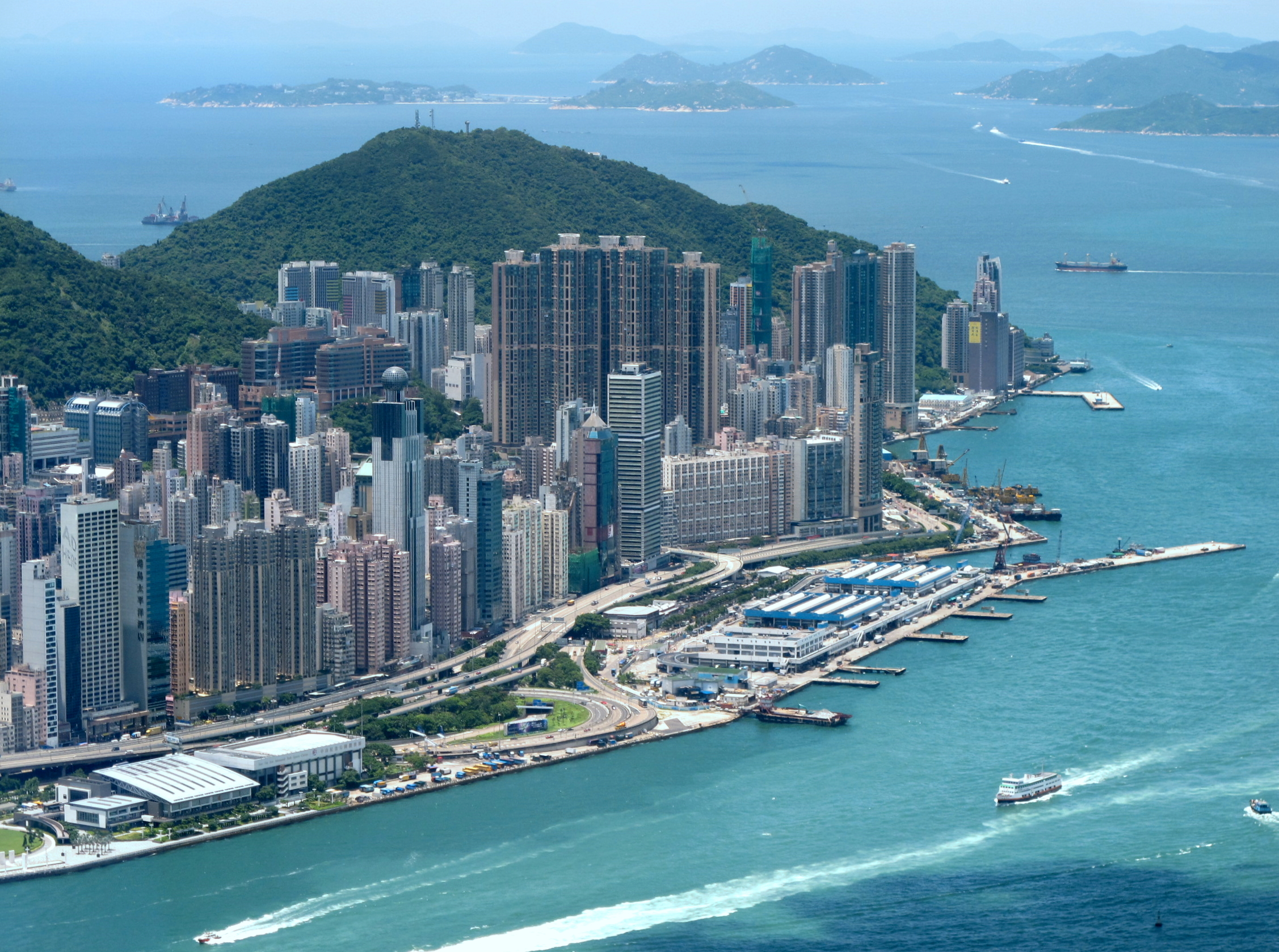
- Traditional Chinese: 西環
- Simplified Chinese: 西环
- Literal meaning: West Ring
Transcriptions
Standard Mandarin
- Hanyu Pinyin: Xīhuán
Yue: Cantonese
- Yale Romanization: Sāi wàahn
- Jyutping: Sai1 waan4

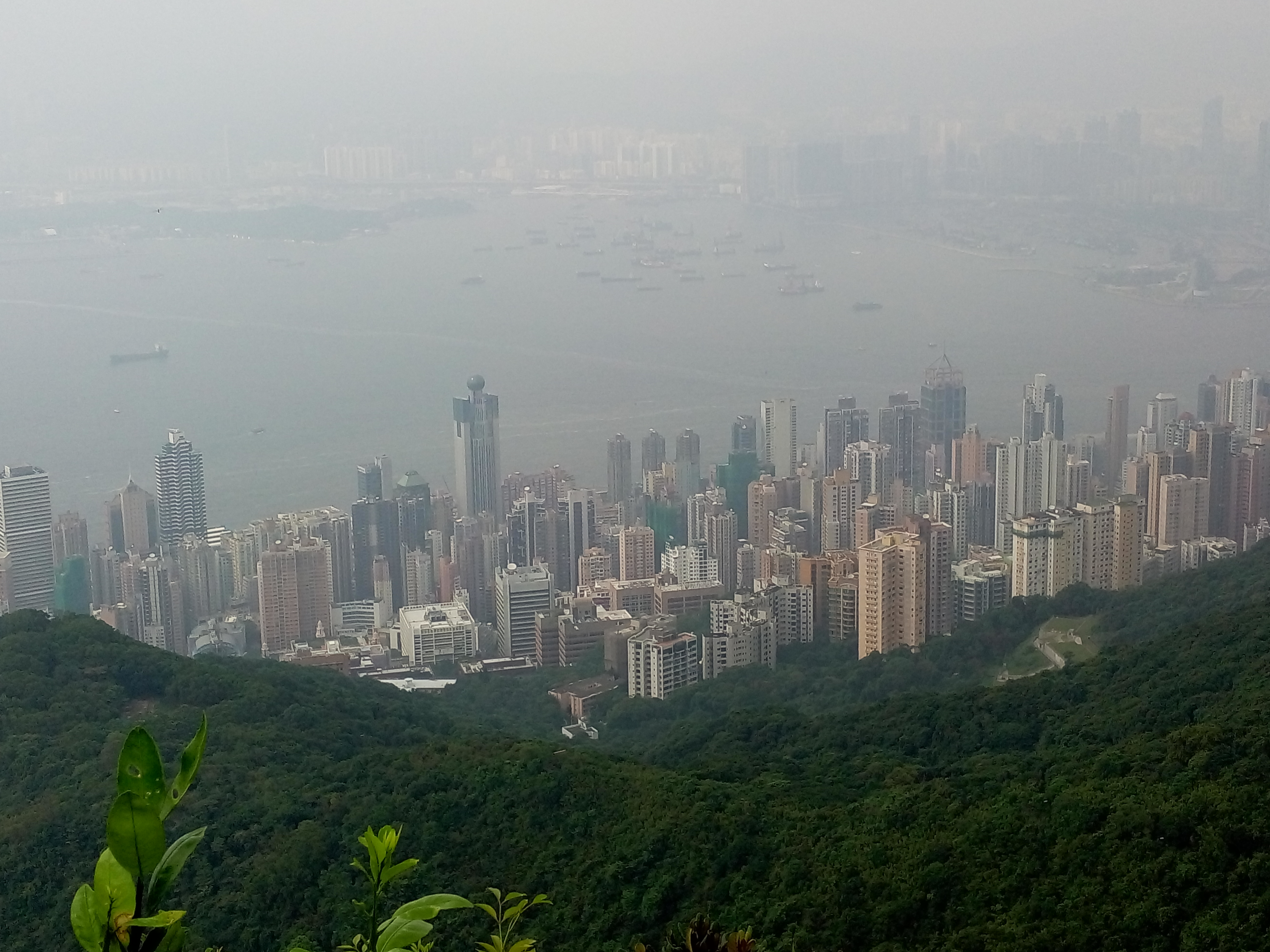
Sheung Wan and Sai Ying Pun as viewed from High West

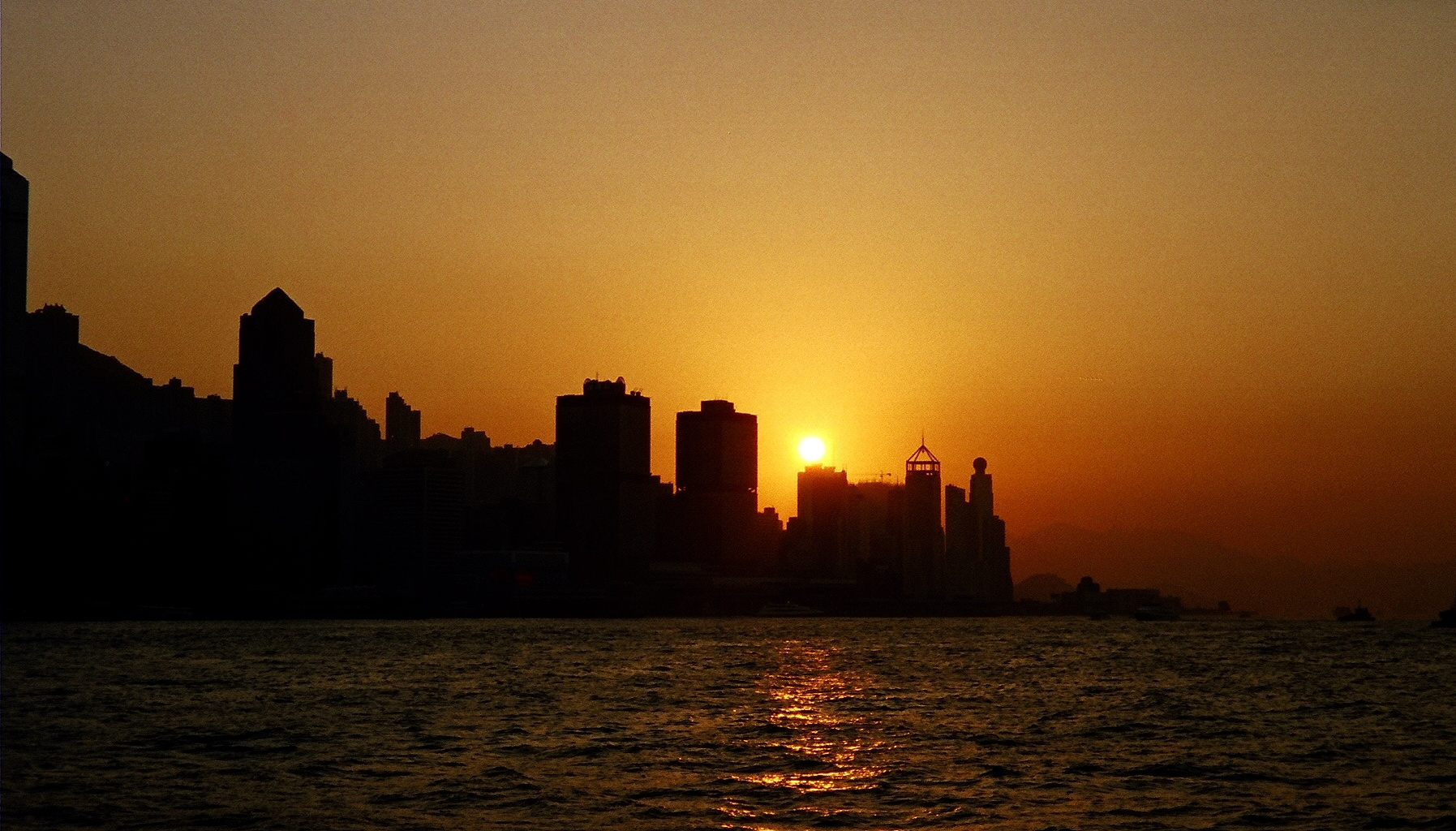
Sunset over Sai Wan

Sai Wan (Chinese: 西環), also known as Western district (Chinese: 西區), or simply Western, is an area in Hong Kong Island, Hong Kong that corresponds to Sai Ying Pun, Shek Tong Tsui, Belcher Bay and Kennedy Town. It formed part of the City of Victoria. West Point, a former cape close to major government structures in Sai Wan, also used to refer to Sai Wan.

After Hong Kong's handover to People's Republic of China, Sai Wan become the location for the Liaison Office of the Central People's Government in the Hong Kong Special Administrative Region and people in Hong Kong, including the former head of the Liaison Office Zhang Xiaoming, colloquially refer the name Sai Wan as a metonym for the Liaison office itself.

== History ==
=== History of Sai Ying Pun ===
Sai Ying Pun originated as a British military camp in 1841. In the early 1800s, Sai Ying Pun was known as a place to settle the Chinese immigrants. It was built from the west of [[Tai Ping Shan|Victoria Peak]] Europeans were also assigned to live in the same area. However, they were separated at the High Street where Chinese were excluded from living.

In 1880, sewerage was installed into the area, with the main flow coming down Centre Street. Streets were covered with macadam and concreted at the same time.

In 1890s, a severe epidemic outbreak of the bubonic plague afflicted Sai Ying Pun residents. Sheung Fung Lane residents were almost wiped out during the period. Government Reports identified this area as the no. IX health district and went into great detail about the buildings where the disease occurred. The neighboring area, Tai Ping Shan, was the most infected place in the city. It was resumed, abandoned and demolished to improve hygiene.

=== History of Shek Tong Tsui ===
The name of Shek Tong Tsui derived from a famous ancient stone pond, "Shek Tong" (石塘) in Cantonese, inside the area. The stone pond was located at modern-day Hill Road and The Belcher's, and was mined by the Hakka people since the 17th century.

In 1903, the first land reclamation of Shek Tong Tsui was finished. In the meantime, the largest brothels in the city, which were located at the Possession Street, were destroyed by a big fire. Consequently, Hong Kong Governor Matthew Nathan decided to move all Hong Kong Island's brothels to Shek Tong Tsui in the early 1900s due to the large area recently claimed from the land reclamation. The place was then being well flourished as a red light district and came to its golden period. Numerous Cantonese opera theaters and restaurants were founded because of the business of brothels. It was the best place to entertain the affluent Chinese in Hong Kong.

Queen's Road was the first road built in Hong Kong, constructed by the British from 1841 to 1843. It connected the Victoria City from Shek Tong Tsui to Wan Chai.

Brothels in this area had also inspired numerous novels and Hong Kong films, most notably Rouge (1987), starring Anita Mui and Leslie Cheung.

=== History of Belcher Bay ===
[[Belcher Bay]] was named after Edward Belcher who landed on Possession Point at the north shore of Hong Kong Island and made the first British survey of Hong Kong Harbour on 25 January 1841.

Belcher Bay, Gin Drinkers Bay and Tseung Kwan O were known as the 'Bay of Trash' in Hong Kong.

Belcher's Street is the main street in Kennedy Town of Hong Kong. It connects Victoria Road and Queen's Road West. A small section in its west end built a turn around for Hong Kong Tramway.

It is currently used as a site for ships to load and unload goods.

=== History of Kennedy Town ===
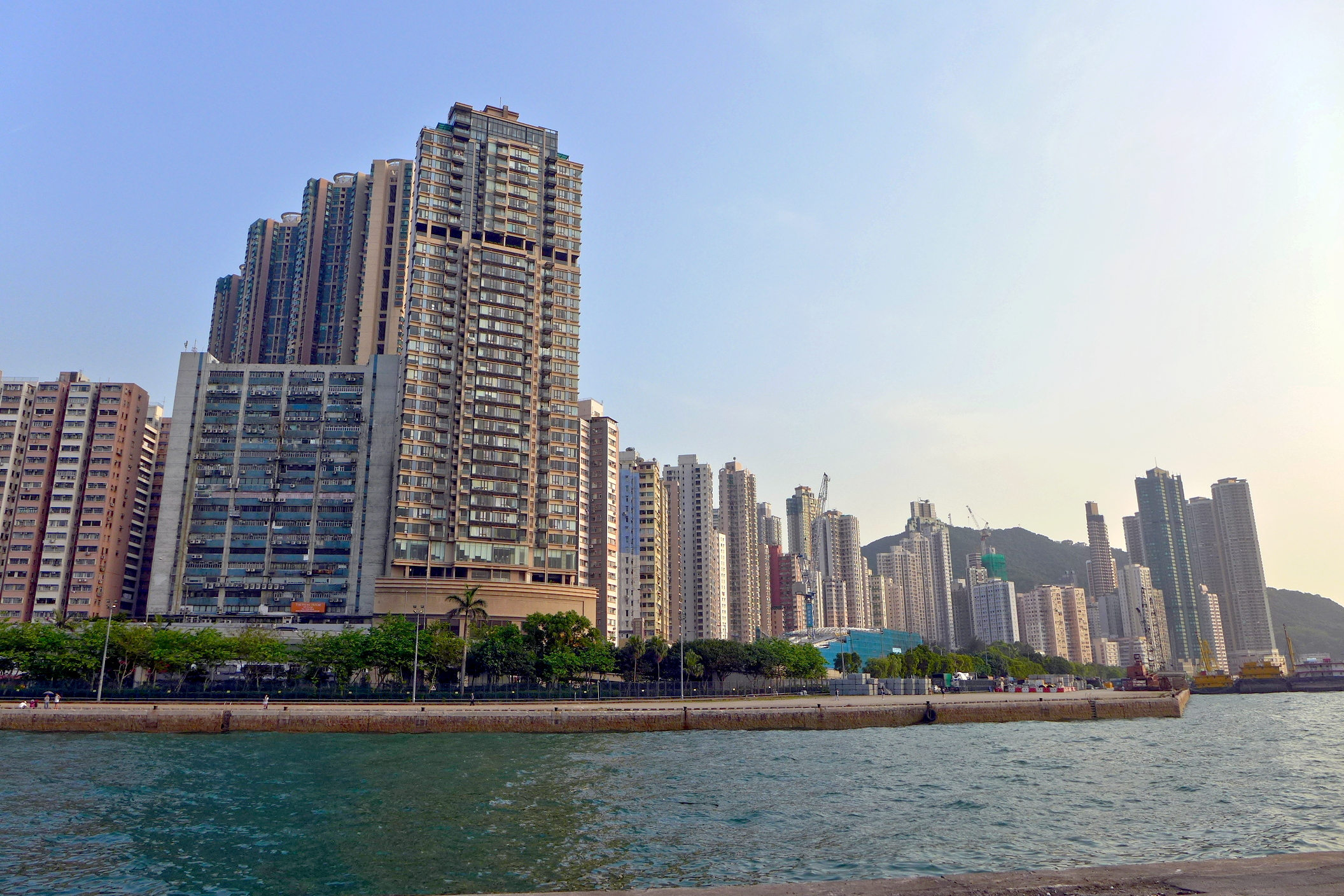
Residential complex in Kennedy Town

Kennedy Town was the western section of the historical Victoria City. It was named after the governor Arthur Edward Kennedy who initiated land reclamation along the coast of this area in 1886. It formed a narrow coastal strip of land that included the Kennedy Praya and the coastal area from Beach Street via Collinson Street to Shek Tong Tsui.

In 1903, the Hong Kong Government erected seven boundary stones for the city, inscribed "City Boundary 1903". One of them is located at the Kennedy Town Temporary Recreation Ground at Sai Ning Street (西寧街).

From 1933 to 1939, more land was reclaimed along the coast of Kennedy Town, yet the construction was suspended due to the Battle of Hong Kong in 1941. Another land reclamation was conducted recently at the end of the 20th century.

== Historical buildings and landmarks ==
- Lo Pan Temple, a Grade I historic building
- Elliot Pumping Station & Filters Senior Staff Quarters, [8] No. 77 Pok Fu Lam Road, a Grade II historic building
- Elliot Pumping Station & Filters Workmen's Quarters, a Grade III historic building
- Elliot Pumping Station & Filters, Treatment Works Building, a Grade III historic building
- Ex-Western Fire Station, No. 12 Belcher's Street, a Grade III historic building. Converted into the Po Leung Kuk Chan Au Big Yan Home for the Elderly
- Sai Ying Pun Community Complex
- University of Hong Kong
- China Merchants Group The Westpoint
- Sai Wan Harbour
- Ching Lin Terrace
- Kwun Lung Lau

== See also ==
- Sun Yat Sen Memorial Park – formerly called Western Park
