= Center Creek (Missouri) =

Stream in the U.S. state of Missouri

Center Creek is a stream in southwest Missouri.

Coordinates of the stream source in Lawrence County are: 36°56′36″N 93°51′13″W and of the confluence with the Spring River on the Missouri - Kansas border are: 37°09′04″N 94°37′01″W.

The headwaters arise as intermittent stream valleys north of Globe on U. S. Route 60 between Aurora and Monett. The stream flows northwest and becomes a permanent stream west of Freistatt. It crosses under Missouri Route 97 and flows into the northeast corner of Newton County then north into Jasper County crossing under Interstate 44 just east of Sarcoxie. The stream turns west and flows under Missouri Route 37 and then U. S. Route 71 south of Carthage. The stream flows west passing south of Oronogo, under Missouri Route 43 and Missouri Route 171 and south of Carl Junction. It ends just west of the Missouri-Kansas border where it joins the Spring River northwest of the village of Klondike and southwest of Smithfield.

Center Creek was named for the fact that part of its watercourse is near the geographical center of Lawrence County.

== See also ==
- List of rivers of Missouri
