= Crémaillère =

French mechanical term

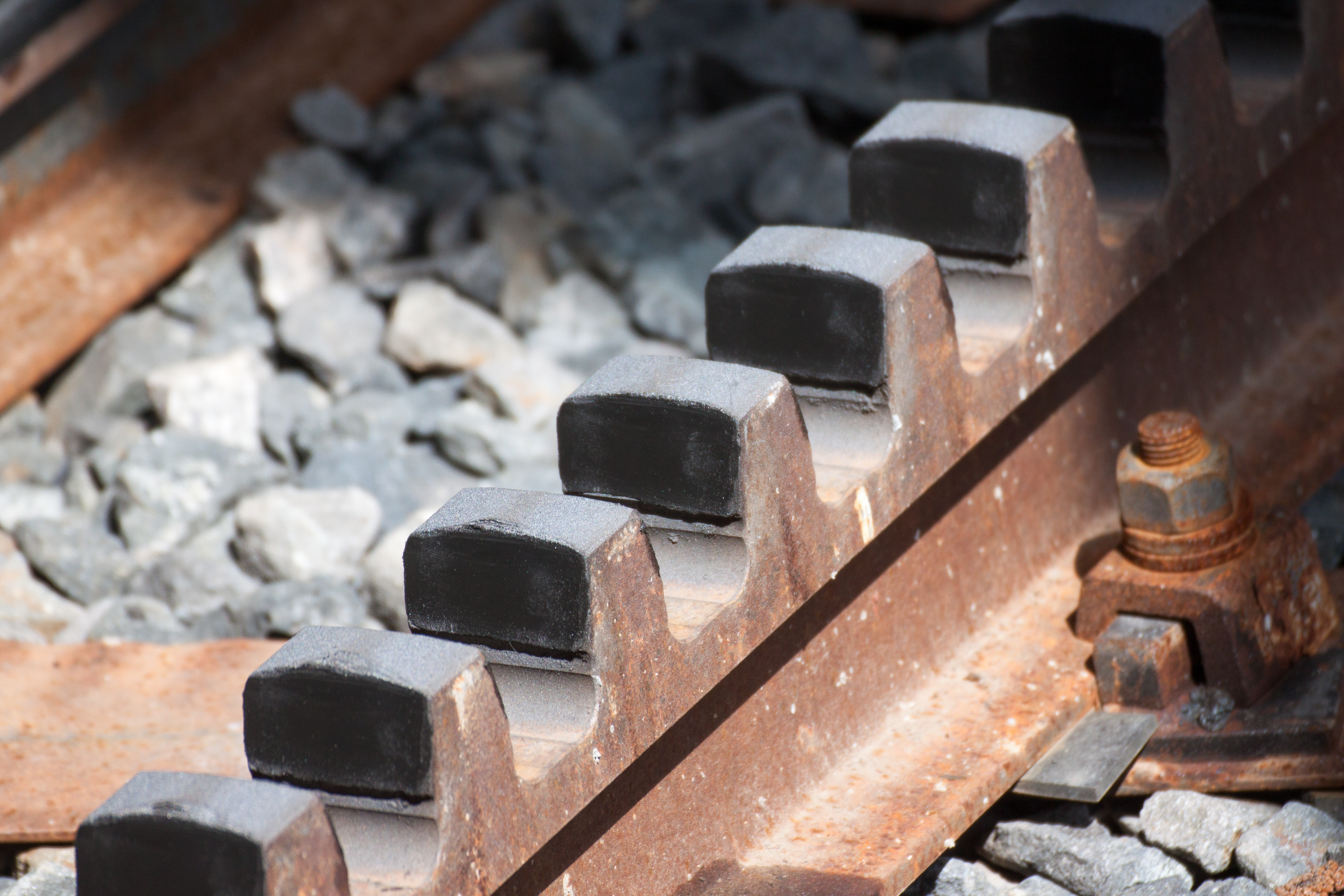
Crémaillère du Panoramique des Dômes

A crémaillère is a French, mechanical term for the rack, or a straight bar with teeth on one edge designed to work into the teeth of a wheel or a pinion (French pignon) that predates the Renaissance. The term was generally applied in English to engineering applications which had notched, toothed or drilled surface, even when only visually so, such as the edge of the staircase. The term is also applied to the rack railway.

During the 17th to 19th centuries, the term was widely applied to lines of entrenchment usually formed in a saw-tooth pattern, known as indented lines, particularly during sieges. These lines are usually employed on banks of rivers, or ground which is more elevated than, or which commands, that of the enemy. The defense of these lines is sometimes strengthened by double redans, and flat bastions constructed at intervals, along their front. During the American Civil War, the Confederate States Army used such defenses in Centerville, Virginia in 1862, while the Union Army used them from 1883 to 1865 at Fort C. F. Smith in Alexandria County (now Arlington County), Virginia.

The term is also applied in artillery to refer to an indented battery, or à Crémaillère constructed with salient and re-entering angles for obtaining an oblique, as well as a direct fire, and to afford shelter form an enfilade fire of the enemy.

The term is also used in surgical instruments, where the "crémaillère" is the toothed hook between the legs of the needle holder, keeping the needle holder locked and thus the needle in place in the needle holder.

In modern French, the crémaillère may also refer to a chimney hook or pot crane: the hook in the fireplace where a cooking pot was traditionally hung. The phrase “pendre la crémaillère” (literally “to hang the chimney hook”) is an expression meaning “to have a housewarming party”.
