= Fort C. F. Smith Historic District =

Fort C. F. Smith Historic District may refer to:

- Fort C. F. Smith Historic District (Fort Smith, Montana), listed on the U.S. National Register of Historic Places (NRHP)
- Fort C. F. Smith Historic District (Arlington, Virginia), NRHP-listed
