= Smith (electronics distributor) =

Electronics company of Texas, United States

N.F. Smith & Associates
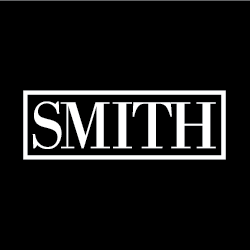
- Industry: Electronic-Component Distribution
- Founded: 1984
- Headquarters: Houston, Texas
- Number of locations: 20
- Revenue: $3.4 billion (2025)
- Website: smithweb.com

Smith, also known as Smith & Associates or N.F. Smith & Associates, is an American electronics distributor company. Headquartered in Houston, Texas, Smith currently ranks eighth among all global distributors.

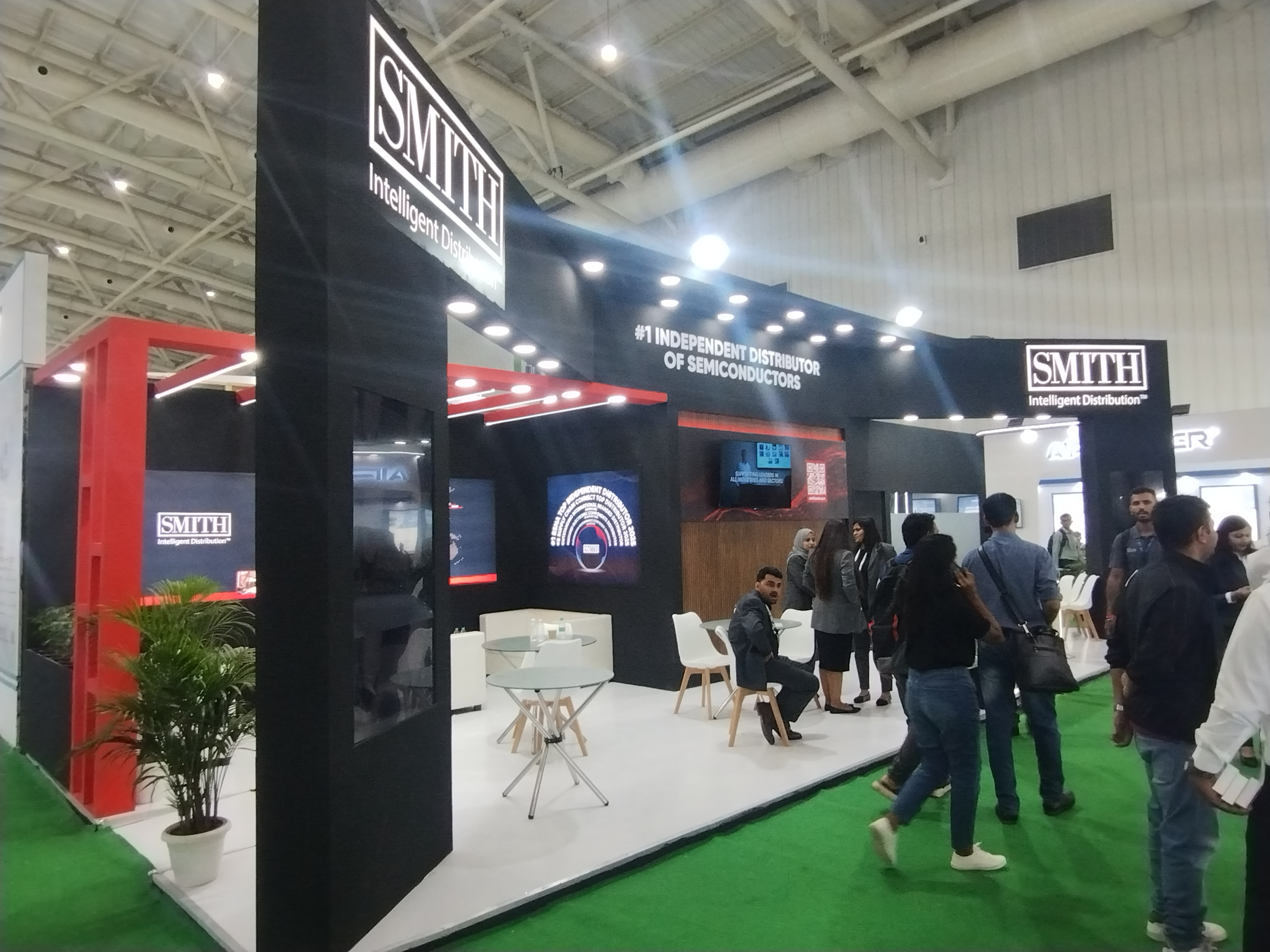
Smith Intelligent Distribution at Electronica 2025, BIEC

== History ==
In 1984, brothers Robert and Leland Ackerley and their wives, Nora and Carmen, founded Smith. Working around a dining table with two phone lines, they connected with top industry figures in the nascent computing industry. With the rise of the newly introduced Macintosh and IBM Personal Computer, a strong market developed for computing components and the business quickly grew. By 1988, the company had over 15 employees and began importing memory chips from overseas.

The 1990s saw marked growth for the company. In 1992, Smith's annual sales were $30 million; by 1998, they had topped $470 million due to the company's expansion of its business into new regions, industries, and service offerings. Smith began focusing on broker and distributor sales and was listed on Inc. magazine’s list of 500 fastest-growing companies in both 1995 and 1996. In 1997, the company had over 100 employees and moved into its new 60,000 sq. ft. headquarters in Houston. It also opened its first major international office and operations hub in Hong Kong that same year before establishing a European presence with the opening of its Amsterdam office in 1999.

As the new millennium arrived, Smith continued to expand. The company completed construction of a 15,000 sq. ft. warehouse in Houston in 2000 and expanded its Amsterdam warehouse two years later, adding to its supply chain services by furthering its ability to handle OEM and CEM consignment and excess inventories. Smith opened offices in Seoul and Guadalajara in 2000, followed by office openings in New York City in 2003, Shanghai in 2004, and Shenzhen in 2008.

Smith was ranked as one of the top leaders in the electronics industry by both Electronic Buyers' News and Purchasing magazines in 2002 and earned ISO 9001 certification the same year. Smith's sales exceeded $500 million for the first time in 2005 as the workforce expanded to more than 300 employees.

In 2010, the company completed construction of an advanced in-house anti-counterfeit laboratory at its headquarters. Four years later, Smith opened its 57,000 sq. ft. operational hub in Houston and relocated the lab to the new facility.

The company opened additional offices in the 2010s: Austin in 2013, Penang in 2014, Bangalore in 2015, and Cluj-Napoca and Munich in 2017. By 2017, Smith's sales exceed $1 billion.

In the current decade, Smith has continued its growth, adding sales offices near strategic customers in Berlin in 2021, London in 2022, and Tokyo and São Paulo in 2023. The company also opened its fourth distribution hub in Houston in 2022 and its fifth in Singapore in 2023.

== Revenue and growth ==
As a privately held company, Smith provides annual revenue figures to supply chain and semiconductor industry media.

In 2005, Smith sales exceeded $500 million for the first time, and the company surpassed $1 billion in 2017. The company’s revenue peaked in 2022 with a total of $4.7 billion.

== Products and sourcing ==
Smith sources and distributes active, passive, and electromechanical IC components, as well as computer products and peripherals such as HDDs, processors, memory modules, video cards, and CPUs, both obsolete and in-production parts. Smith has shipped more than six billion parts to more than 137 countries since 2021. The company works with more than 4,000 manufacturers to source nearly 80,000 unique parts.

It serves customers in a broad range of industries, including consumer electronics, enterprise electronics, server hardware, automotive, telecommunications, medical, oil and gas, energy, and aeronautics and defense.

- Aerospace and defense
- Automation
- Automotive
- Consumer Electronics
- Data centers
- E-commerce
- Education
- Gaming
- IoT
- Medical
- Mobile
- Oil and gas
- Solar

== Services ==
Over time, the company expanded on the shortage sourcing that characterized its earliest business model. Services offered include:

- Vendor-managed inventory
- Obsolescence procurement
- Shortage sourcing
- Excess inventory management
- Data center services
- Secure data erasure
- Component recovery
- Reverse logistics

Smith launched SmithTrade in 2024 as its exclusive online marketplace for customers to buy, bid on, and sell excess components, peripherals, and equipment. The platform connects vendors holding excess inventory to interested buyers.

All products sourced through Smith and SmithTrade are authenticated and verified in the company’s two in-house laboratories in accordance with ISO/IEC 17025.

== Sustainability ==
Since 2011, Smith has been “committed to work toward becoming a climate neutral, zero waste-to-landfill distributor.” That year, the company launched its Sustainability Group to help guide the company’s environmental initiatives. Since then, Smith has converted its headquarters to use motion-activated LED lighting and solar thermal water heating to reduce energy consumption. It has also installed solar panels on the roof and across its parking lot, as well as adding electric-vehicle charging stations to encourage employees to drive electric.

Smith was named Overall Winner: Greatest Implementation of Green Building Innovations in Houston's 2011 Green Office Challenge, the United States' largest Green Office Challenge for 2011. Smith's headquarters have been certified to ISO 14001 since 2005 and to R2v3 since 2015. Its Amsterdam operational hub achieved WEEELABEX certification in 2024 for responsible processing and disposing of electronic waste. In 2025, the company was awarded a Bronze Medal from EcoVadis for its strong progress in advancing environmental, social, and ethical practices throughout its global operations and broader supply chain, placing it among the top 35 percent of all organizations globally. It also received a B (Management) grade for climate change from CDP for actively addressing their environmental impact and ensuring strong environmental-management practices across the full scope of their business.

== Culture ==
As a family-owned company with deep ties to cities around the world, Smith contributes to global charities and supports philanthropic events every year in its local communities.

Smith was recognized by the Houston Business Journal with an Outstanding Diversity Helping Hand award in 2021 and named as one of its Best Family-Owned Businesses in 2023.

Smith has also been recognized by Comparably for numerous workplace recognition awards. Based on anonymous feedback from Smith’s employees, the company has received more than 30 awards since 2022. It was recognized on Comparably’s 2025 lists for the Best Company Culture, Best CEOs, Best Company Compensation, Best Company Perks & Benefits, Happiest Employees, Best Company Work-Life Balance, Best Sales Teams, Best Leadership Teams, Best Career Growth, Best Company for Diversity, Best Company for Women, and Best Company Outlook. It has already been recognized by Comparably in 2026 on its Best Company for Diversity and Best Company for Women lists.

According to Smith, more than 60 Smith employees have been with the company for at least 20 years.
