= Fort Smith =

Fort Smith is the name of:

- Fort Smith, Labrador, Canada, now known as North West River
- Fort Smith, Northwest Territories, Canada
- Fort Smith, Arkansas, United States
  - Fort Smith National Historic Site in Fort Smith, Arkansas
- Fort Smith, Montana, United States
- Fort Smith, a former Confederate fort in what is now Bossier City, Louisiana

== See also ==
- Fort C. F. Smith (disambiguation)
