= Smithville =

Smithville may refer to:

== Places ==
=== Canada ===
- Smithville, Nova Scotia
- Smithville, Ontario

=== Jamaica ===
- Smithville, Clarendon Parish, Jamaica

=== United States ===
- Smithville, Arkansas
- Smithville, California, now Loomis, California
- Smithville, Georgia
- Smithville, Illinois
- Smithville, Monroe County, Indiana
- Smithville, Bullitt County, Kentucky
- Smithville (Duluth), Minnesota, a neighborhood
- Smithville, Mississippi
- Smithville, Missouri
- Smithville, Atlantic County, New Jersey
- Smithville, Burlington County, New Jersey
- Smithville, New York
- Smithville, North Carolina, now Southport, North Carolina
- Smithville, Ohio
- Smithville, Oklahoma
- Smithville, Rhode Island
- Smithville, Tennessee
- Smithville, Texas
- Smithville, Utah, now Gandy, Utah
- Smithville, Virginia, now Surry, Virginia
- Smithville, West Virginia

== Other ==
- Smithville (album), by jazz musician Louis Smith
- Smithville Colored School in Colesville, Maryland
