= Smiths =

Smiths or Smith's may refer to:

== Companies ==
- Smith Electric Vehicles, or Smith's, a manufacturer of electric trucks
- Smith's Food and Drug, or Smith's, an American supermarket chain
  - Smith's Ballpark, a baseball stadium in Salt Lake City, Utah, U.S. named for the company
- Smiths Group, a British engineering company
  - Smiths Aerospace, a former subdivision now called GE Aviation Systems
  - Smiths Medical, a former subdivision now part of ICU Medical
- The Smith's Snackfood Company, a British-Australian snack food company owned by PepsiCo
- WHSmith, or Smith's, a British retailer
  - Smiths News, a British distributor of newspapers and magazines, demerged from WHSmith

== Other uses ==
- Metalsmiths
- The Smiths, an English rock band in the 1980s
  - The Smiths (album), 1984
- Smith's Friends, a name for Brunstad Christian Church originating in Norway
- Smith's (cycling team), a Belgian professional cycling team 1966–1968
- The Smiths, a 2014 sitcom pilot by Lee Mack

== See also ==
- Smith (disambiguation)
- Smith Family (disambiguation)
- Smiths Falls, in Ontario, Canada
- Smiths Station, Alabama, U.S.
- SmithZz, a French professional gamer
