= Smithfield Township =

Smithfield Township is the name of several places in the United States:

- Smithfield Township, DeKalb County, Indiana
- Smithfield Township, Fayette County, Iowa
- Smithfield Township, Johnston County, North Carolina
- Smithfield Township, Jefferson County, Ohio
- Smithfield Township, Bradford County, Pennsylvania
- Smithfield Township, Huntingdon County, Pennsylvania
- Smithfield Township, Monroe County, Pennsylvania
- and also: Middle Smithfield Township, Monroe County, Pennsylvania

== See also ==
- Smithfield (disambiguation)
