= Smith Township =

Smith Township may refer to the following places:

== In Canada ==
- Smith Township, Peterborough County, Ontario (historic, now part of Selwyn township)

== In the United States ==
=== Arkansas ===
- Smith Township, Cleveland County, Arkansas
- Smith Township, Cross County, Arkansas
- Smith Township, Dallas County, Arkansas
- Smith Township, Lincoln County, Arkansas
- Smith Township, Saline County, Arkansas

=== Indiana ===
- Smith Township, Greene County, Indiana
- Smith Township, Posey County, Indiana
- Smith Township, Whitley County, Indiana

=== Kansas ===
- Smith Township, Thomas County, Kansas

=== Missouri ===
- Smith Township, Dade County, Missouri
- Smith Township, Worth County, Missouri
- and also: May/Smith Township, Laclede County, Missouri

=== North Carolina ===
- Smith Township, Duplin County, North Carolina

=== North Dakota ===
- Smith Township, Towner County, North Dakota

=== Ohio ===
- Smith Township, Belmont County, Ohio
- Smith Township, Mahoning County, Ohio

=== Pennsylvania ===
- Smith Township, Washington County, Pennsylvania

=== South Dakota ===
- Smith Township, Brule County, South Dakota

== See also ==
- Smith (disambiguation)
