= Smith Automobile Company =

Defunct American motor vehicle manufacturer

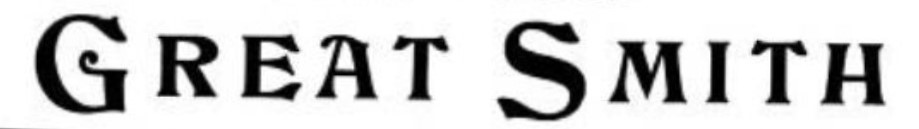
- Great Smith logo from 1907 advertisement
- Industry: Automotive
- Founded: 1902; 124 years ago
- Founder: Clement Smith, Anton Smith, Terry Stafford
- Defunct: 1911; 115 years ago
- Fate: Bankruptcy
- Headquarters: Topeka, Kansas, United States
- Key people: Clement Smith, Anton Smith, Terry Stafford
- Products: Automobiles
- Production output: 770 (1902-1911)

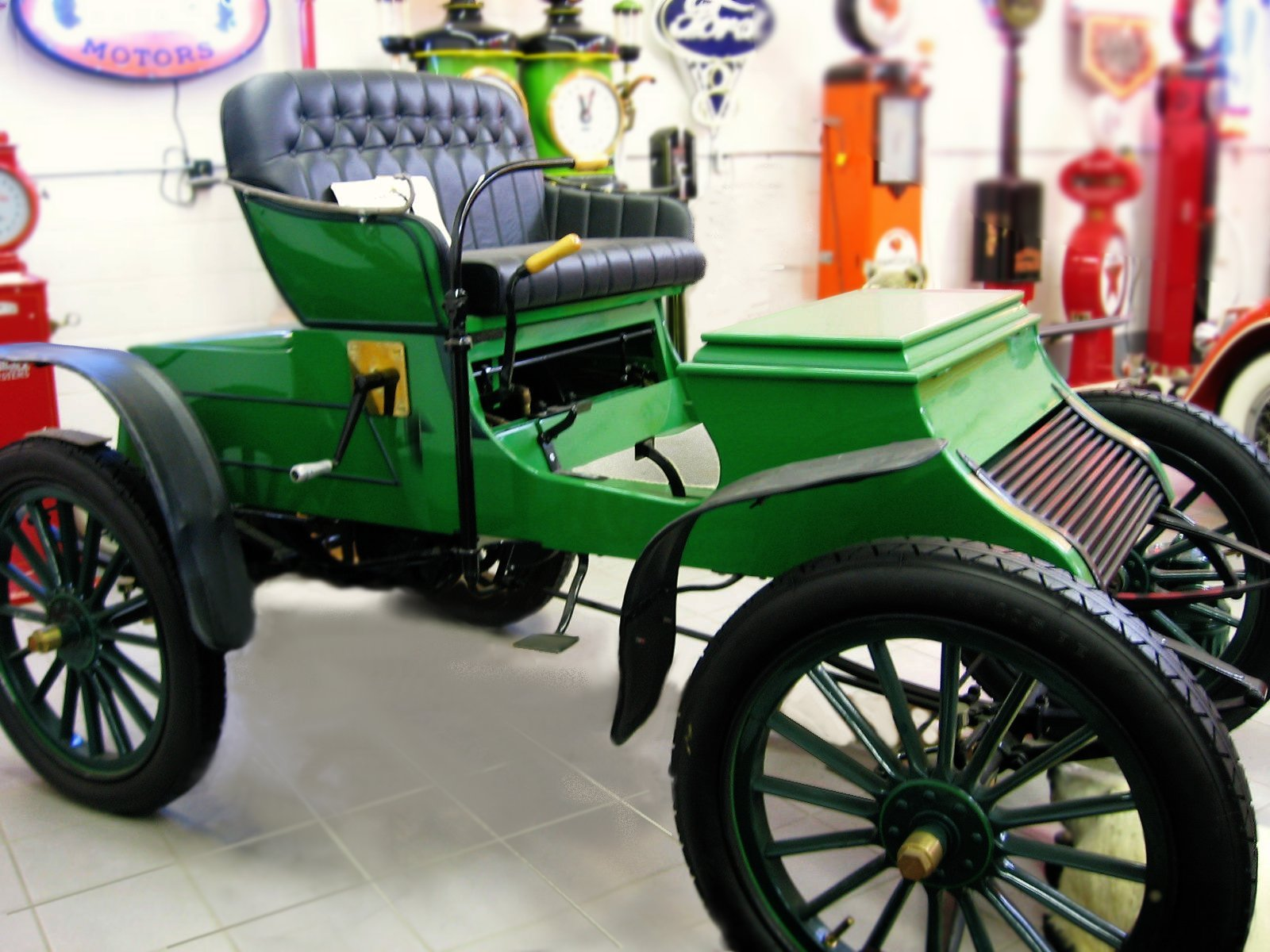
1902 Smith - One of 10 built for Parkhurst -Davis Mercantile from August to November 1902

The Smith Automobile Company of Topeka, Kansas, was an early United States automobile manufacturing company which produced the Veracity, Smith, and Great Smith lines of automobiles from 1902 to 1911. They were the first automobiles made west of the Mississippi River.

== History ==
Terry Stafford was testing his first car by February, 1900. Lacking operating capital, he gained financing from the artificial limb manufacturing brothers Anton and Clement Smith. The Smith brothers financed the building of a factory and the first automobiles were sold to the public in August, 1902. Early two-cylinder Smiths were marketed as Veracity with Smith becoming the marque name with the introduction of larger cars.

Smith Automobile Company was formed in November 1904 with a capitalization of $100,000. Terry Stafford designed a new four-cylinder car with shaft-drive introduced as a mid year-model in 1906.

The Great Smith of 1907 was priced at $2,500 (equivalent to $86,384 in 2025) with a 318 in^{3} (5213 cc) (4.5×5-inch, 114×127mm) water-cooled four, four-speed sliding gear transmission (three forward, one reverse), multi-disk clutch. It featured 34×4 in (86×10 cm) spoke wheels and a 107 in (2718 mm) wheelbase. Smith advertised heavily that almost all parts were built in their own factory under their own patents.

In 1908, a Great Smith became the first automobile to make it to the top of Pikes Peak. In 1908 and 1909, the Smith brothers sold their interests in the company and Michigan investors took over with plans to move the factory to Grand Rapids, Michigan. This was opposed by A.L.A.M. and Smith remained in Topeka. In 1910 Smith Automobile made a plea for financial assistance to Topeka residents to save the company but by December, 1910 Smith Automobile Company was in the hands of a Receiver.

Upon exiting the automobile business, Anton Smith reportedly destroyed all the files and records of the company in a large bonfire. Terry Stafford left the company in 1908 to build an automobile under his own name. The Stafford Motor Car Company lasted until 1915. President Harry Truman owned a Stafford Automobile.

The Smith automobile plant was sold to Charles and George Southwick in 1911 who built remaining Smith cars from parts on hand. The plant was sold to a silo manufacturer in 1912.

The Kansas Historical Society has a red and black Great Smith on display.

== Models ==
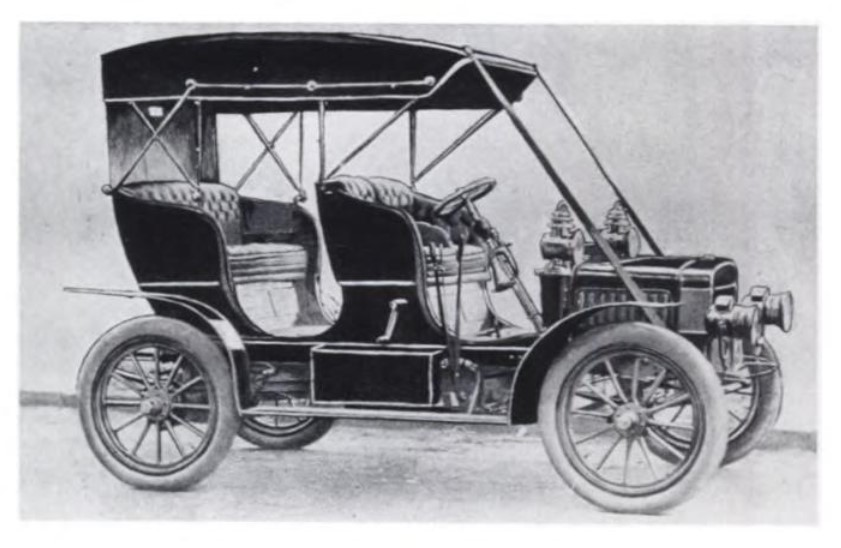
1905 Smith Surrey from a Smith Automobile catalog

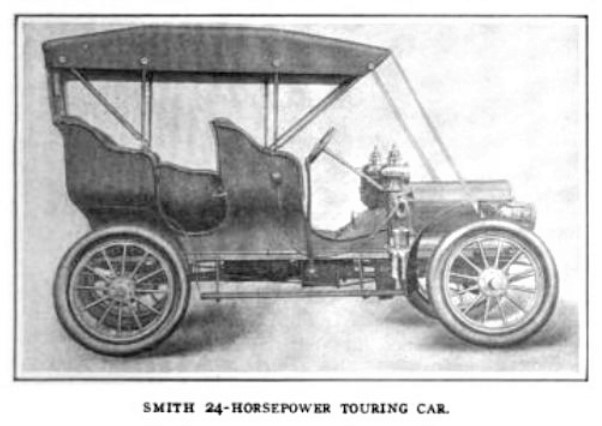
1906 Smith 24-hp Touring Car from The Automobile

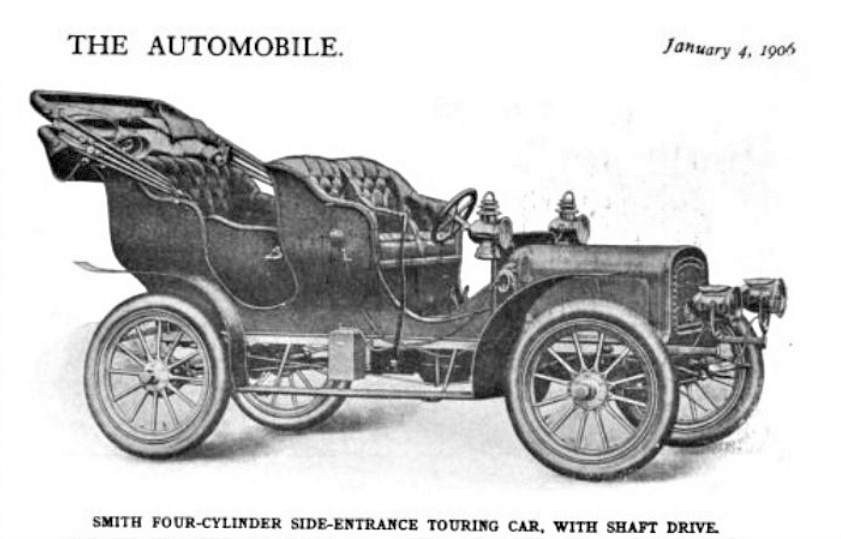
1906 Smith Four-cylinder Touring Car with Shaft-drive from The Automobile

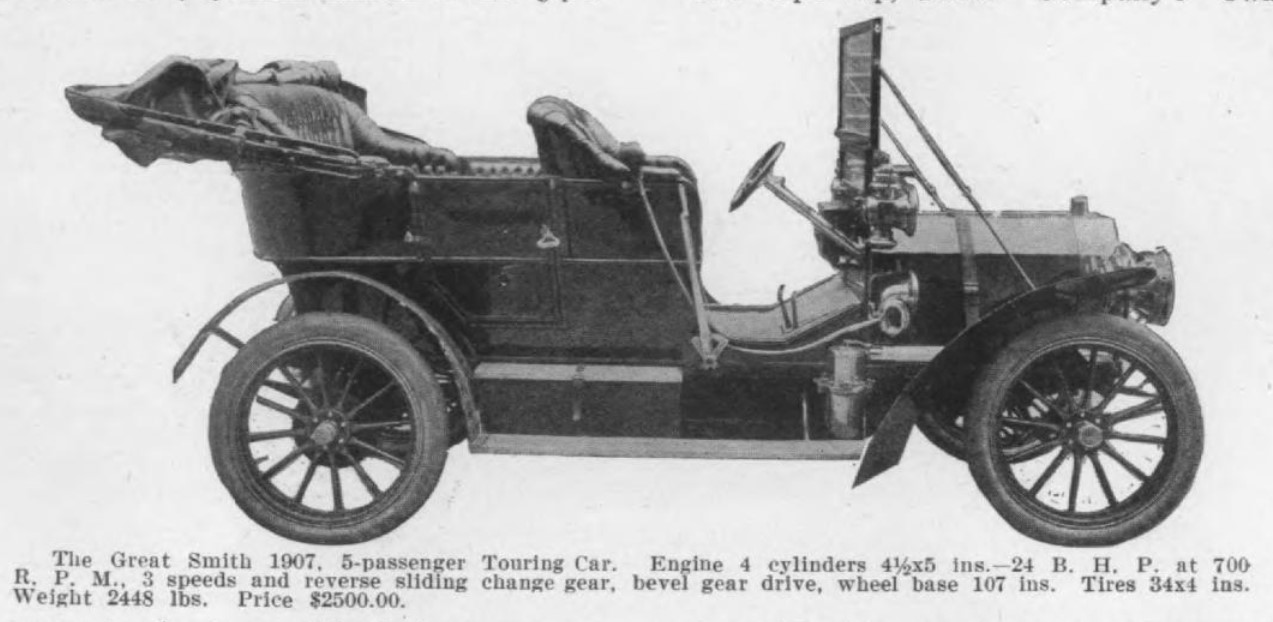
1907 Great Smith Touring Car from article in Cycle and Automobile Trade Journal

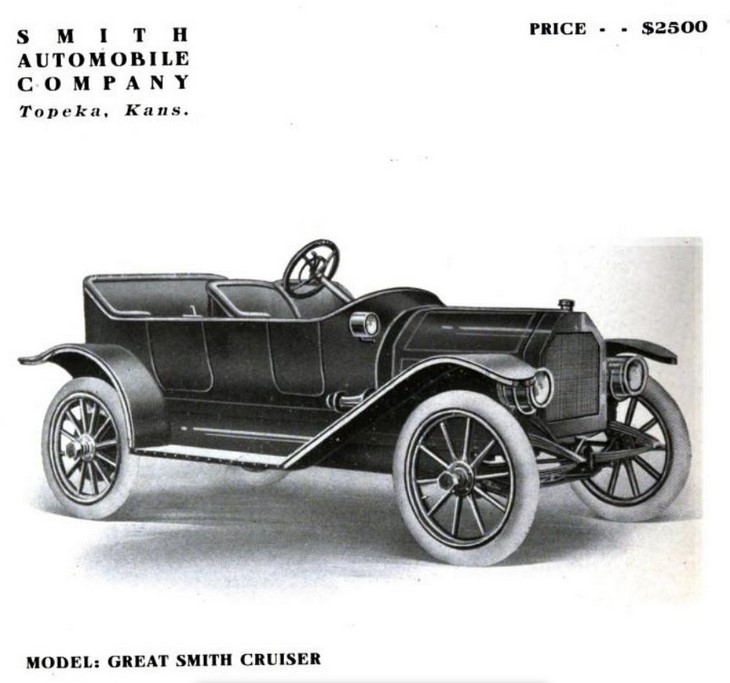
1911 Great Smith Cruiser from Hand Book of Gasoline Automobiles

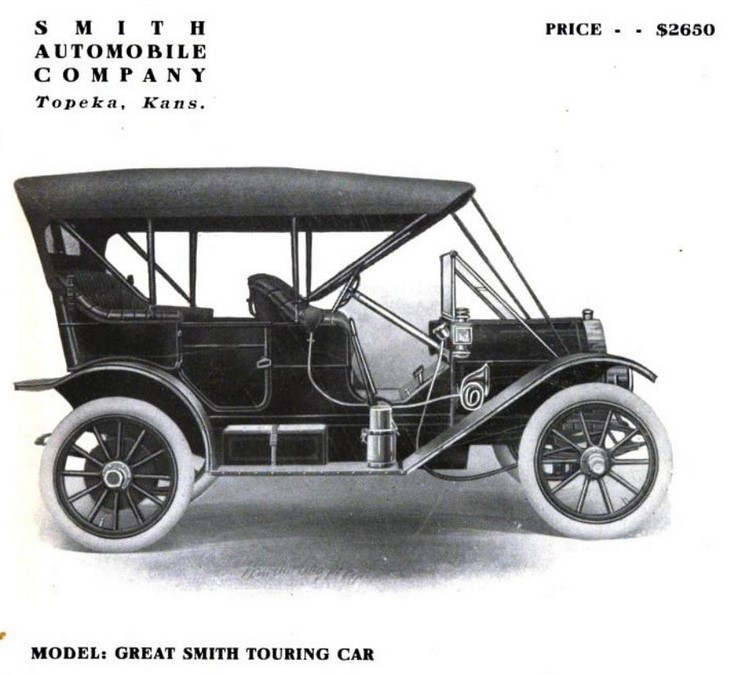
1911 Great Smith Touring Car from Hand Book of Gasoline Automobiles

== Advertisements ==
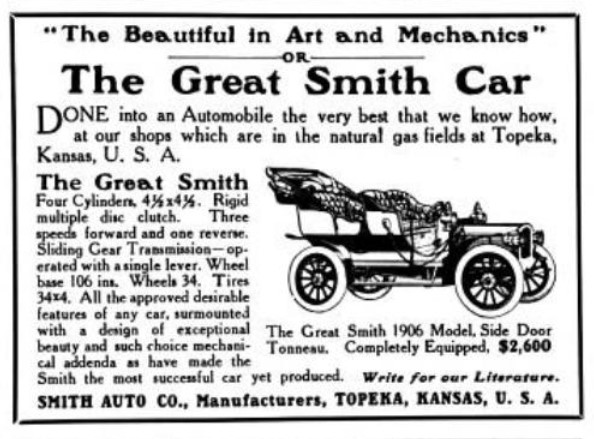
1906 Great Smith advertisement in Motor magazine

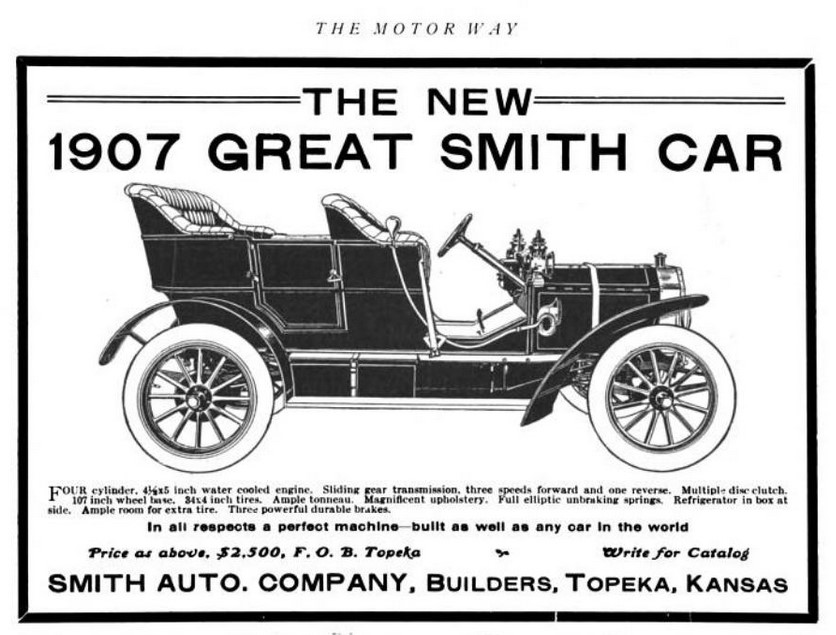
1907 Great Smith in Motor Way

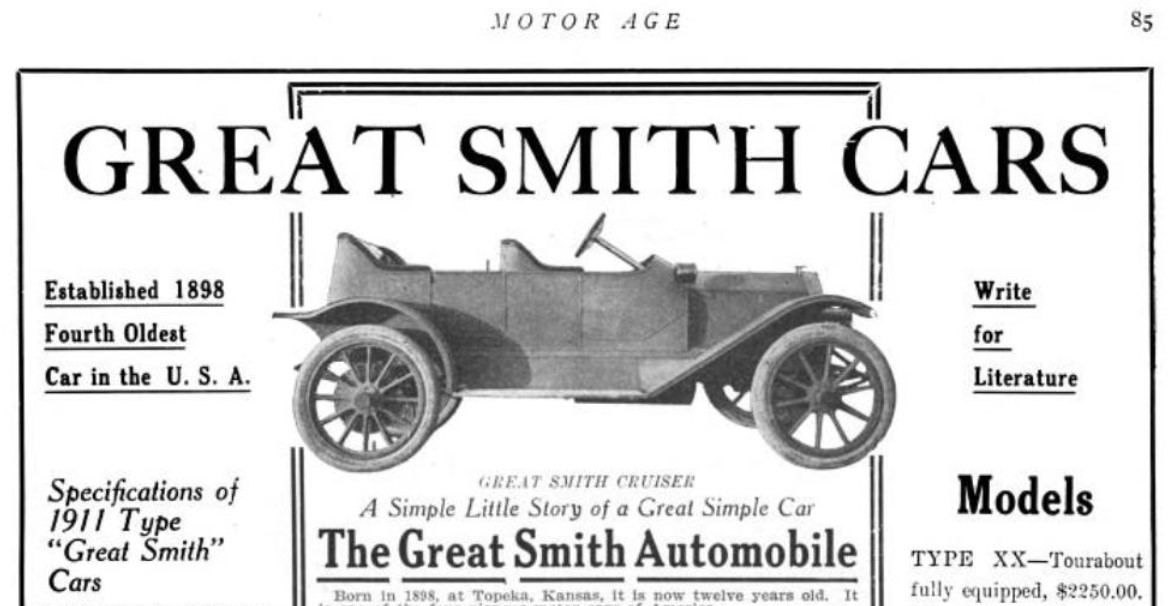
1910 Great Smith advertisement from Motor Age

== See also ==
- Brass Era car
- List of defunct United States automobile manufacturers
