= Data center services =

Data center services encompass all of the services and facility-related components or activities that support the implementation, maintenance, operation, and enhancement of a data center, which is an environment that provides processing, storage, networking, management and the distribution of data within an enterprise.

As of 2024, the global market for data center services was estimated to be worth approximately $62.23 billion, with expectations of nearly doubling to $110.34 billion by 2030, driven by a steady annual growth rate of around 10%.

Generally, data center services fall into two categories: services provided to a data center or services provided from a data center.

== Support services ==
Support services for the data center can be generally defined as technical support, which provides assistance to help solve problems related to technology products. Technical support services for data centers help to address challenges with the servers, storage, software and networking equipment that constitute a data center, or the related processes involved in managing data center equipment. Data center support services can also include installing and configuring technical equipment. Careers in this industry include (1) Technical Support Analyst, (2) Help Desk Engineer, or (3) Information Support Specialists.

== Technical consulting services ==
Consulting and integration services provide expertise and input to help organizations make strategic decisions and systems integrations. Technical consulting services are one specific type of service that falls under the overall consulting services umbrella. Technical consulting services provide guidance and expertise on the application of technology. This can include selecting or designing new technology, redesigning existing technology, migrating existing technology to a new environment, or integrating new technology into existing technology. Examples of technical consulting services specific to data center services might include selecting a new data center location, consolidation, virtualization, automation, redesigning data centers for cloud computing, implementing storage arrays, or incorporating offsite storage services into an existing network.

A 2024 industry survey found that nearly all IT leaders consider direct network connections essential for improving security, performance, and cost efficiency when using multiple cloud services.

== Outsourcing services ==
IT outsourcing occurs when one company (the outsourcing customer) contracts with an outsourcing vendor to provide IT services that the customer would otherwise deliver in-house. Such IT services could be disaster recovery, data storage or other IT functions. Outsourcing services for the data center can range from hosting, managing, and maintaining an entire data center to more discrete data center tasks such as upgrading servers or backing up data.

== Application services ==
The definition of application services varies depending on the type of company offering the services. An application service provider is a large segment within application services that provides software-based services to other companies that access those services over a network. Examples of ASP services include Web hosting and e-mail hosting. Application services can also include any service that helps companies develop, integrate or manage applications for their own networks. Services in this category can include applications for mobile environments and devices. Careers include, (1) Application Support Analysts, (2) Applications Engineer or (3) Business Analyst.

== Technical training services ==
The specific definition of technical training varies depending on the industry and the job. The word technical simply indicates that something (a task, duty or job skill) is peculiar to a specific art, science, profession, trade or the like. Technical training services, therefore, provide knowledge, skills and competencies that apply to a specific job, trade or profession. Within the umbrella of data center services, technical training services can provide skills relevant to any of the hardware, software or processes related to managing a data center, or fixing, updating, integrating or managing any of the equipment within a data center.

== Financing and leasing services ==
Financing and leasing services provide a means for individuals or companies to acquire goods without any initial capital outlay. Financing is the act of acquiring capital for a purchase or some other activity. Financing services are offered by lenders (a bank or other institution) that provide capital to other individuals or companies in the form of a loan, which is then paid back within a predetermined time period for a set fee or interest rate. Leasing is the act of entering into a contractual arrangement (i.e. a lease) to obtain temporary possession of an asset (land, equipment, etc.) in exchange for a fixed compensation (for example, a monthly payment). Leasing services are provided by organizations that either manage the lease and payment transactions, furnish the assets or land that is being leased, or both. Financing and leasing services within the context of data center services might include leasing a data center facility; leasing data center equipment, such as servers; or financing a data center project, such as building or upgrading a data center facility.
