= Smithland =

Smithland may refer to the following places in the United States:

- Smithland, Indiana
- Smithland, Iowa
- Smithland, Kentucky
- Smithland (Natchez, Mississippi), listed on the NRHP in Mississippi
- Smithland Farm (Henderson, West Virginia), listed on the NRHP in West Virginia
