= Smithfield Plantation =

Smithfield Plantation may refer to:

- Smithfield Plantation (Port Allen, Louisiana)
- Smithfield Plantation (Fredericksburg, Virginia)
- Smithfield (Blacksburg, Virginia)
