= Smithers (disambiguation) =

Smithers is a surname of British origin.

Smithers may also refer to:

- Smithers, British Columbia, a town in Canada
  - Smithers Airport, a public airport
  - Smithers Secondary School
  - Smithers railway station
- Smithers, West Virginia, a city in the United States
- Smithers Lake, Texas, United States

== See also ==
- Smithers Rapra, publishers of Polymer Library, formerly Rapra Abstracts
- Smither
