= Smith Peak =

Mountain in California, United States

- Location within California

Highest point
- Elevation: 7,756 ft (2,364 m) NAVD 88
- Prominence: 951 ft (290 m)
- Coordinates: 37°55′36″N 119°44′06″W

Geography
- Location: Yosemite National Park; Tuolumne County, California, U.S.
- Parent range: Sierra Nevada
- Topo map: USGS Hetch Hetchy Reservoir

Climbing
- Easiest route: Trail hike (class 1)

Smith Peak, in Yosemite National Park in the United States, overlooks the Hetch Hetchy Reservoir and provides grand vistas of the Hetch Hetchy Valley and surrounding wilderness. It is named for a sheep owner who claimed to own the Hetch Hetchy Valley and used it as a summer pasture.
