= West Point, Hong Kong =

Coordinates: 22°17′13.15″N 114°08′25.65″E

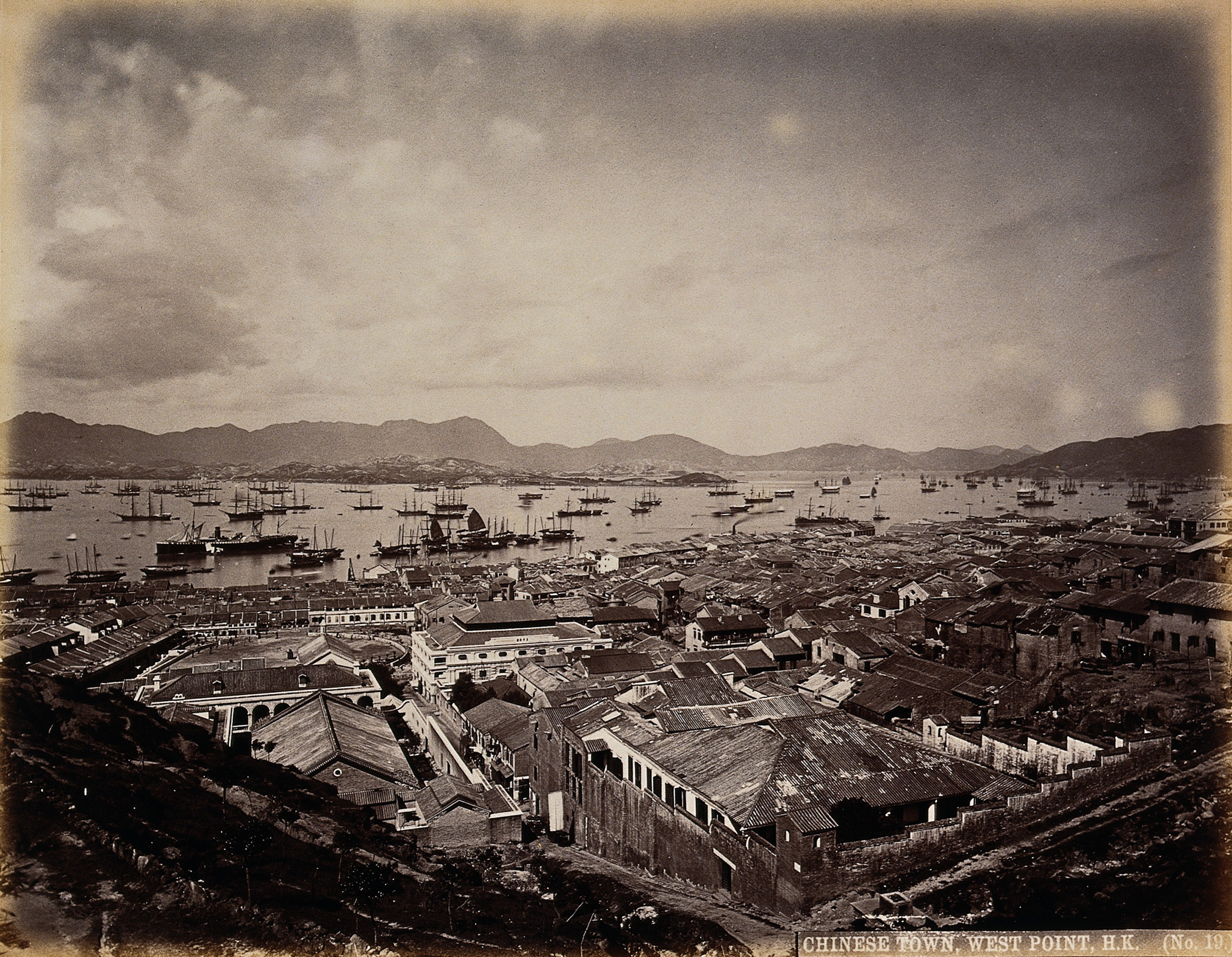
West Point, Hong Kong

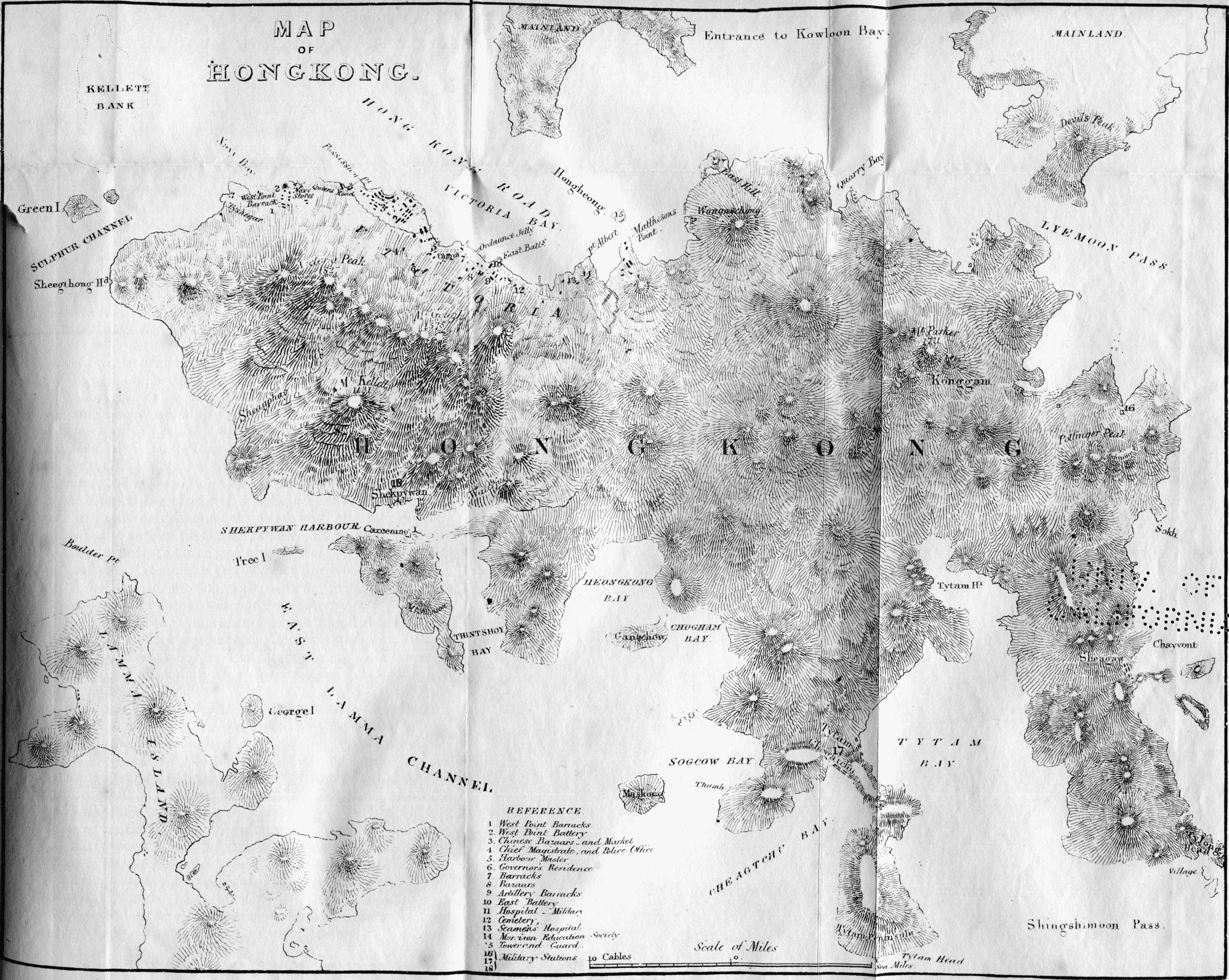
1845 map of Hong Kong showing "West Point Barrack"

West Point (Chinese: 西點 or 西角) was a point of land on Hong Kong Island, Hong Kong, east of Sulphur Channel. Its location is the shore off Pok Fu Lam Road and Queen's Road West in 1845, approximately the junction of Western Street and Des Voeux Road West near Western Police Station. This was the northernmost point on the western half of Hong Kong Island.

The Hong Kong Government divided Victoria City into four wan (環), or districts. While West Point falls into Sai Wan, or Western District, major government structures like the police station and court (Western Magistracy) are located near West Point. Thus the name of Sai Wan, Western District, Western and West Point were sometimes used interchangeably.

St. Stephen's Anglican Church located in West Point was founded by the Church Missionary Society (Church Mission Society) (CMS) in 1865. It was led by Vicar Tsing-Shan Fok (霍靜山, 1851–1918), one of the earliest Chinese clergymen in Hong Kong, beginning in 1904.

== See also ==
- Possession Street
