= Kwun Lung Lau =

Public housing estate in Hong Kong

Coordinates: 22°16′50″N 114°07′40″E

- Chinese: 觀龍樓
- Cantonese Yale: Gūn lùhng làuh
Transcriptions
Yue: Cantonese
- Yale Romanization: Gūn lùhng làuh
- Jyutping: Gun1 lung4 lau4

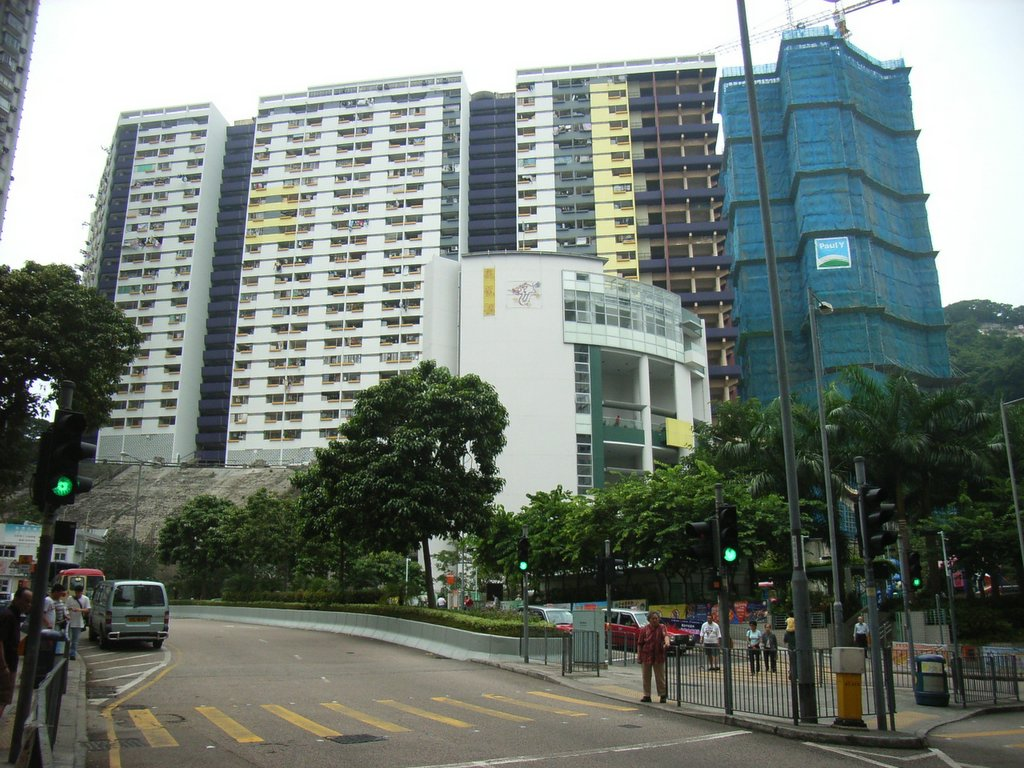
Kwun Lung Lau, viewed from Smithfield

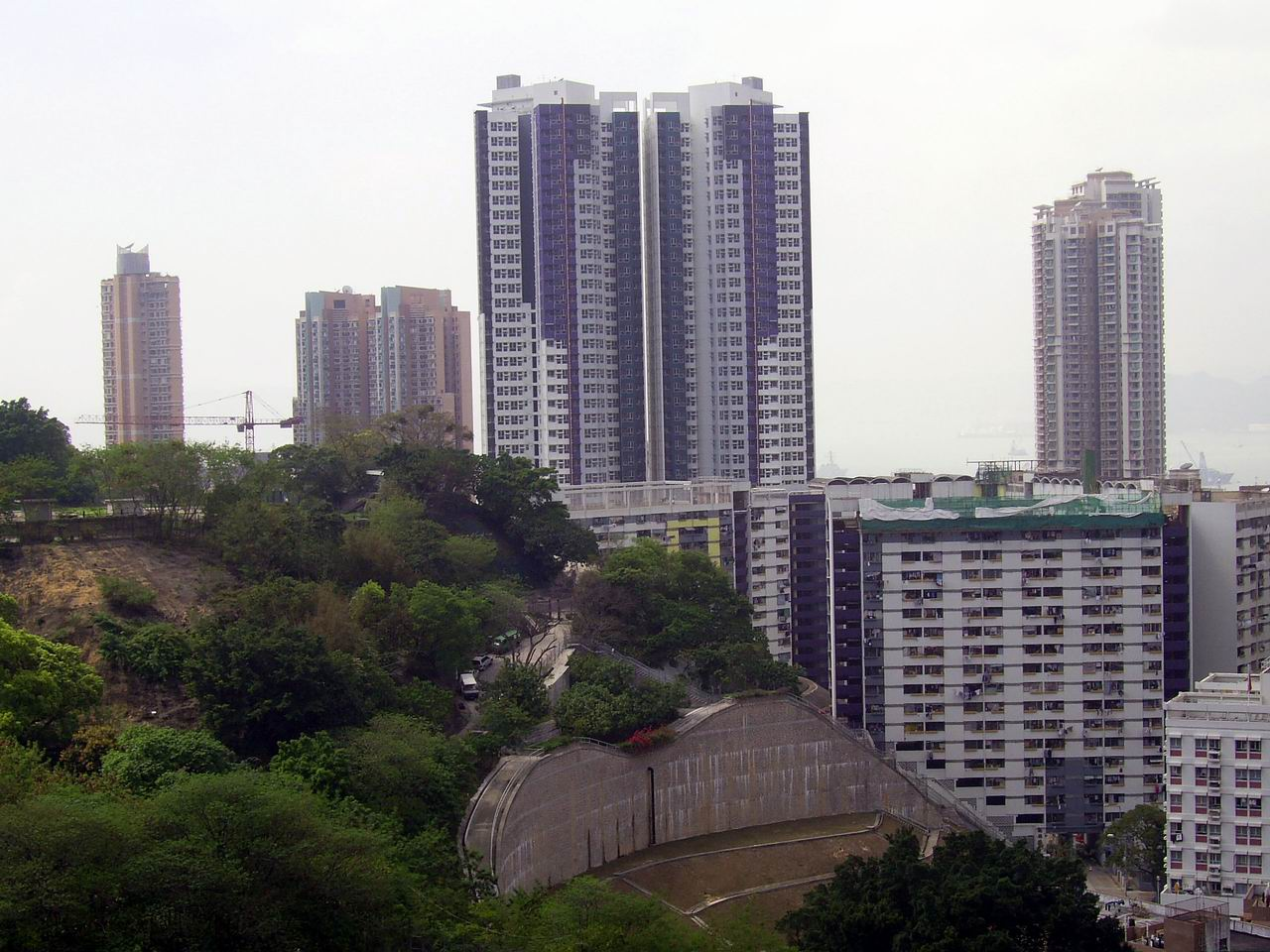
Kwun Lung Lau

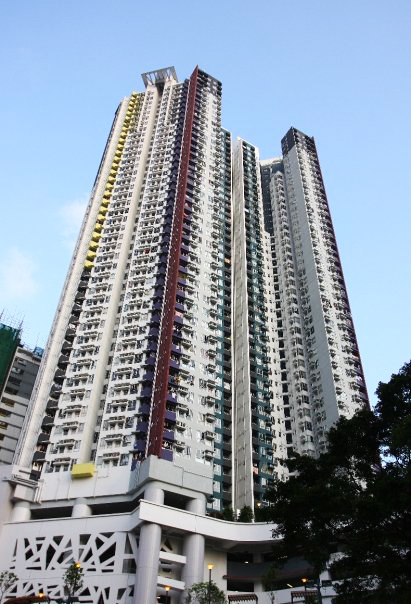
Kwun Lung Lau Redevelopment Phase 1

Kwun Lung Lau is a public housing estate in Kennedy Town, Hong Kong. It is one of the first public housing developments in Hong Kong, built in 1967 to alleviate a housing crisis in the territory. It is on 20 Lung Wah Street.

It consists of seven buildings, namely Block A - G. The overall shape was that of a snaking dragon, and hence its name which means Watching Dragon Building in Chinese.

Kwun Lung Lau is also famous for a landslide on 23 July 1994 that killed five people and injured three. Leaking water and heavy rain had built up behind a masonry retaining wall, which was too thin, and subsequently collapsed. This disaster caused a major review of slope safety in Hong Kong.

== Demographics ==
According to the 2016 population by-census, Kwun Lung Lau has a population of 6,069. 97% of the population is Chinese. Median monthly domestic household income is HK$ 17,000.

== Politics ==
Kwun Lung Lau is located in Kwun Lung constituency of the Central and Western District Council. It was formerly represented by Fergus Leung Fong-wai, who was elected in the 2019 elections until April 2021.

== See also ==
- Sai Wan Estate
- List of public housing estates in Hong Kong
