= Smith Center =

Smith Center may refer to:

- Smith Center, Kansas, a city in the United States
- Smith Center for the Performing Arts, in Las Vegas, Nevada, U.S.
- Smith Campus Center, a building at Harvard University in Cambridge, Massachusetts, U.S.
- Charles E. Smith Center, an arena at George Washington University in Washington D.C., U.S.
- Clarice Smith Performing Arts Center, at the University of Maryland, College Park, Maryland, U.S.
- Dean Smith Center, an arena at the University of North Carolina, Chapel Hill, North Carolina, U.S.
