= Fort C. F. Smith (Arlington, Virginia) =

Archaeological site in Virginia, United States

- Fort C. F. Smith Historic District
- U.S. National Register of Historic Places
- U.S. Historic district
- Virginia Landmarks Register
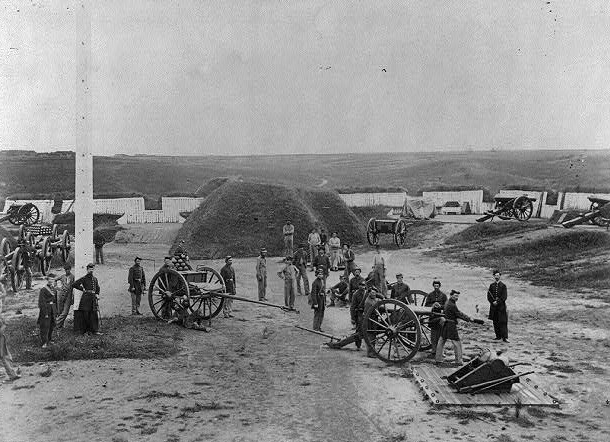
- Part of the lunette's earthworks are on the right.

- Location within District of Columbia Location within Virginia Location within the United States
- Location: 2411 24th St., Arlington, Virginia
- Coordinates: 38°54′4″N 77°5′28.3″W
- Area: 19 acres (7.7 ha)
- Built: 1863
- NRHP reference No.: 99001719
- VLR No.: 000-5079

Significant dates
- Added to NRHP: February 1, 2000
- Designated VLR: September 15, 1999

Fort C.F. Smith was a lunette that the Union Army constructed in Alexandria County (now Arlington County), Virginia, during 1863 as part of the Civil War defenses of Washington (see Washington, D.C., in the American Civil War). It was named in honor of General Charles Ferguson Smith, who died from a leg infection that was aggravated by dysentery on April 25, 1862. Fort C. F. Smith connected the Potomac River to the Arlington Line, a row of fortifications south of Washington, D.C., that was intended to protect the capital of the United States from an invasion by the Confederate States Army.

The Army built the lunette on a bluff overlooking the Potomac River and Spout Run. Because of its elevation and location, the lunette could protect the Aqueduct Bridge from invaders traveling along each of the two waterways.

== History ==
=== Civil War ===
Following the Union Army's defeat at the Second Battle of Bull Run (Manassas) in August 1862, the Army constructed Fort C. F. Smith in 1863. The lunette was located on property that Thomas Jewell had previously owned and that contained a red house. During construction, the fort was therefore referred to "Fort at Red House". The Army destroyed the house while building the lunette and nearby fortifications.

The lunette had places for 22 guns and had a perimeter of 368 yards (336 m). General John G. Barnard wrote in a report that "Fort C. F. Smith was carefully planned and constructed after our latest models." The lunette had a southern and western face and two flanks, as well as a crémaillère line on the north side to protect it from attack up the ravines from the river.

A May 17, 1864, report from the Union Army's Inspector of Artillery (see Union Army artillery organization) noted the following:

Fort C. F. Smith, Maj. W. A. McKay commanding.–Garrison, four companies Second New York Heavy Artillery–1 major, 15 commissioned officers, 1 ordnance-sergeant, 548 men. Armament, three 12-pounder field howitzers, two 6-pounder field guns, four 24-pounder siege guns, one 8-inch sea-coast howitzer, six 4 ½ -inch ordnance, and four 8-inch siege mortars. Magazines, two; dry and in serviceable condition. Ammunition, full supply and well packed. Implements, complete and serviceable. Drill in artillery, very ordinary; wants improving much. Drill in infantry, insufficient; wants more energy and attention given to it. Discipline, great want of improvement. Garrison is sufficient.

In 1865, the lunette's armaments were: one 8-inch sea-coast howitzer, three 12-pounder howitzers, four 24-pounder siege guns, two 10-pound Parrot rifles, six 4 ½-inch ordinance, three 4-inch siege mortars, and six vacant platforms. Fort C. F. Smith and other Union Army fortifications on and near the Arlington Line saw little or no fighting during the war; the Army's biggest enemies in the area were diseases such as malaria and typhoid fever, as well as handling live ammunition.

=== Post-War ===
After the Civil War ended in April 1865, the Army dismantled and abandoned Fort C.F. Smith during the fall of that year. Wooden structures and revetments were removed. The Army destroyed the lunette's magazines and bomb-proof in order to salvage their wooden structural remains. Used lumber, timber, hardware, and tools were sold at public auctions.

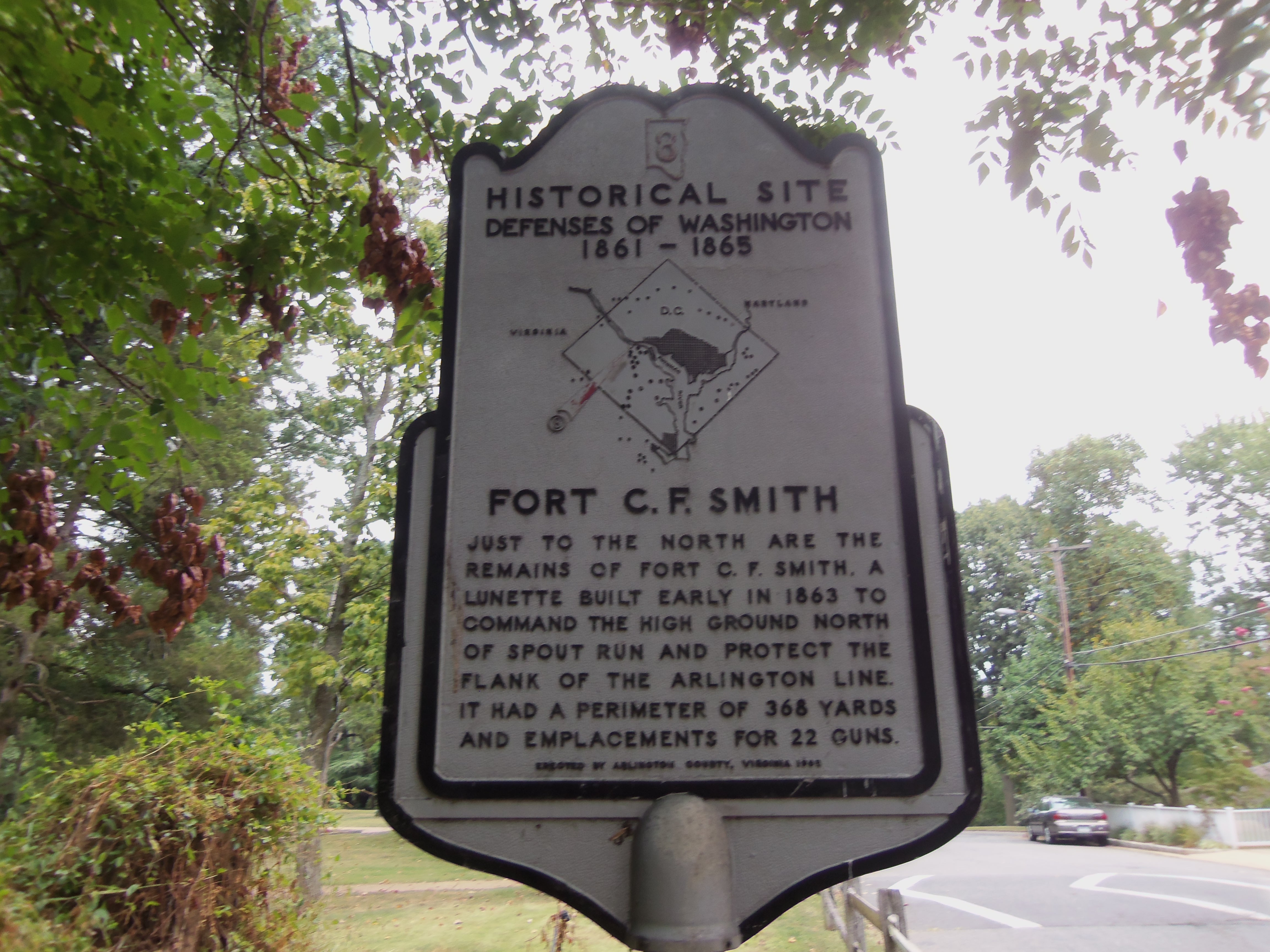
1965 historical marker at Fort C.F. Smith (2013)

Thomas Jewell's family then succeeded in recovering their property. The Deming and Yates families took ownership of the property from 1888 to 1924. Charles Lindsay owned the property from 1924 to 1926. The Hendry family then owned the property from 1927 to 1993.

Construction of 24th Street North destroyed about one-third of the lunette's remains. However, the development of the property into a private estate provided a measure of protection to the remains of the lunette north of 24th Street.

=== Arlington County park ===
In 1965, the Arlington County government erected a historical marker near the site of the lunette's remnants. The Arlington County Board designated the lunette to be a local historic district on February 28, 1987.

In 1994 and in succeeding years, the County government acquired the lunette's property, created the 19 acres (7.7 ha) Fort C.F. Smith Park, and preserved the lunette's remnants at a cost of over $11 million. On February 1, 2000, the National Park Service listed the fort on the National Register of Historic Places.

== Today's park ==
=== Earthwork remnants ===
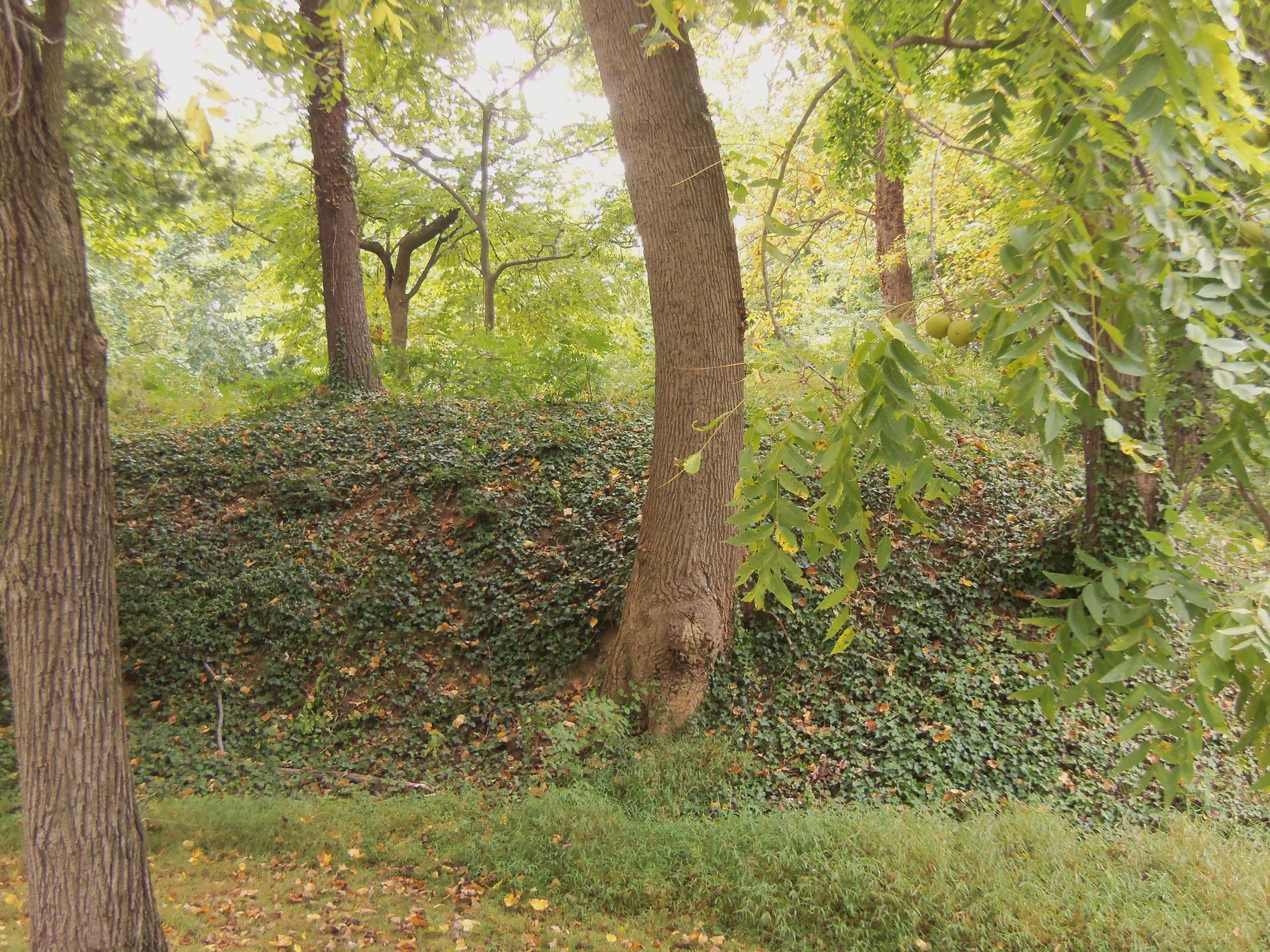
Earthworks in Fort C.F. Smith Park (September 2013)

With the exception of those that construction of 24th Street North removed, the earthen remains of the lunette survive largely intact within Arlington County's Fort C.F Smith Park. Gun platforms 8-11 are clearly visible, as is a well. The fortification contains bastions that are unusual within lunettes. The ammunition magazine is also still visible, as is the bombproof area. Soldiers would use the bombproof if they were under siege, as it functioned as a traverse that localized the effects of shell bursts. Parapets, which protected the soldiers from fire, and the gorge, which protected soldiers from flanking fire, also remain visible.

=== Trail connections ===
The park is on two recognized trails. The Virginia Department of Wildlife Resources places the 19acre park as stop 6 of its Great Falls Loop, between the Potomac Heritage Trail which begins at the Theodore Roosevelt Island parking lot, and the Potomac Overlook Regional Park.

Virginia Civil War Trails has erected a historic marker near the fort's site. The Arlington County government hosted an event celebrating the opening of a new visitors center in Fort C.F. Smith Park on March 31, 2018. The park occasionally hosts reenactments and other programs, and tours are available.

== See also ==
- List of Arlington County Historic Districts
