= Smithfield, Missouri =

Unincorporated community in the US state of Missouri

Coordinates: 37°10′08″N 94°36′11″W

Smithfield is an unincorporated community in Jasper County, in the U.S. state of Missouri.

== History ==
A post office called Smithfield was established in 1871, and remained in operation until 1934. The community has the name of the local Smith family.
