= Davis Street =

Davis Street is the name of several streets:

- Davis Street, Scranton, Pennsylvania and Taylor, Pennsylvania
- Davis Street, Hong Kong
- Davis Street (San Francisco, California)
- Davis Street (Portland, Oregon)
