= New Praya, Kennedy Town =

Praya in Kennedy Town

Coordinates: 22.283939°N 114.127591°E

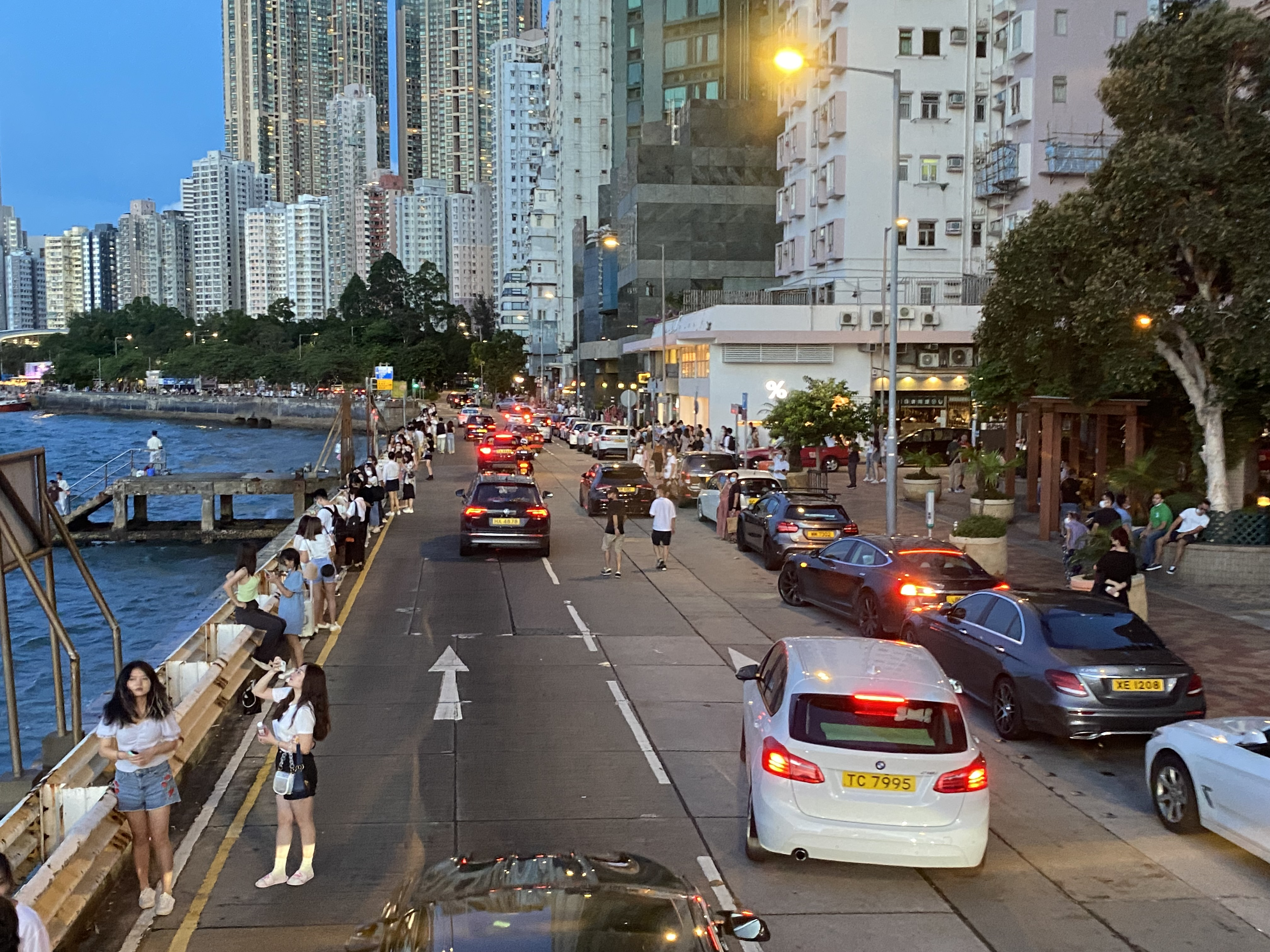
New Praya, Kennedy Town in 2021. Looking east to Shek Tong Tsui

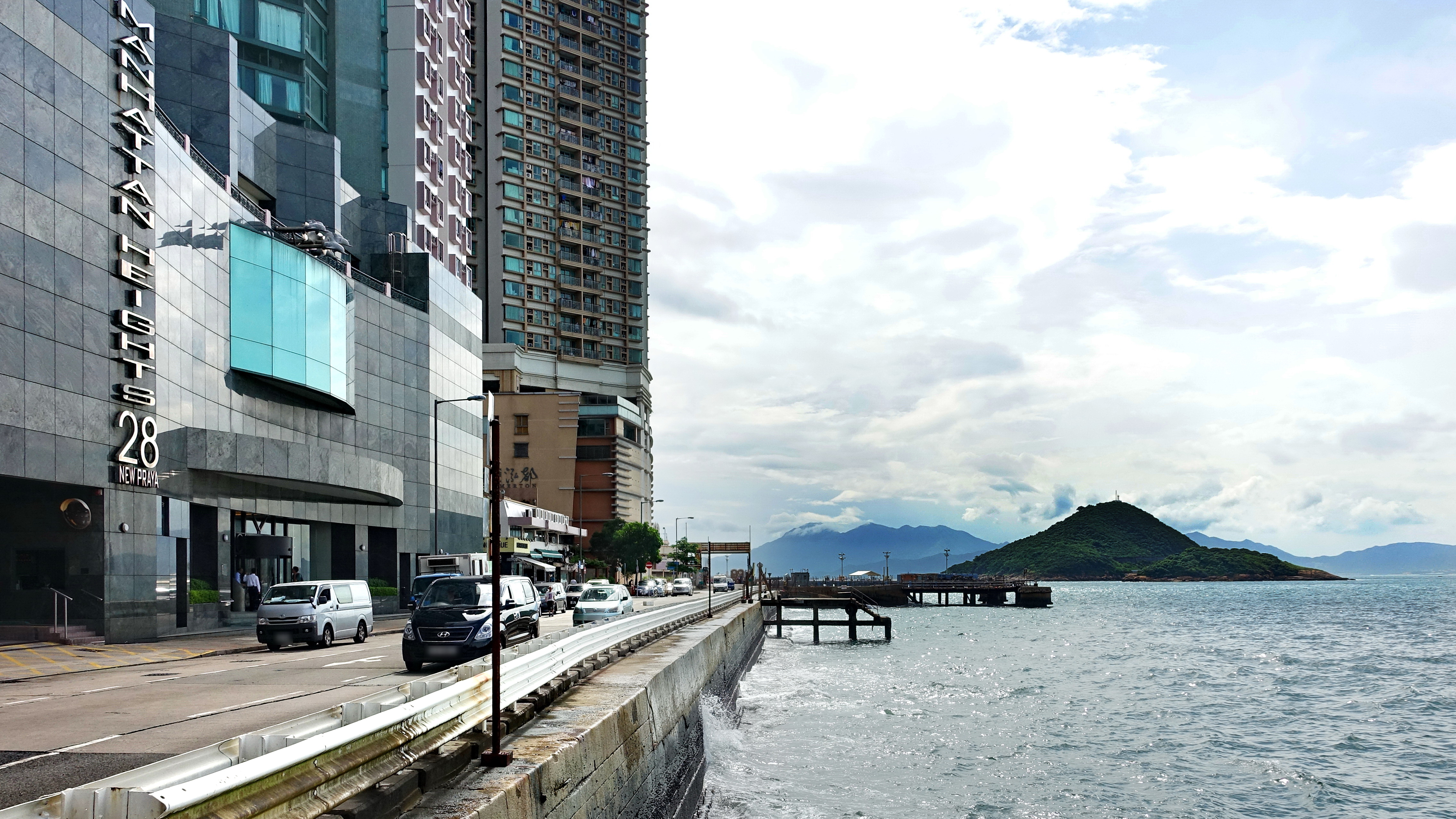
New Praya, Kennedy Town, looking west to Green Island. The seawall is visible.

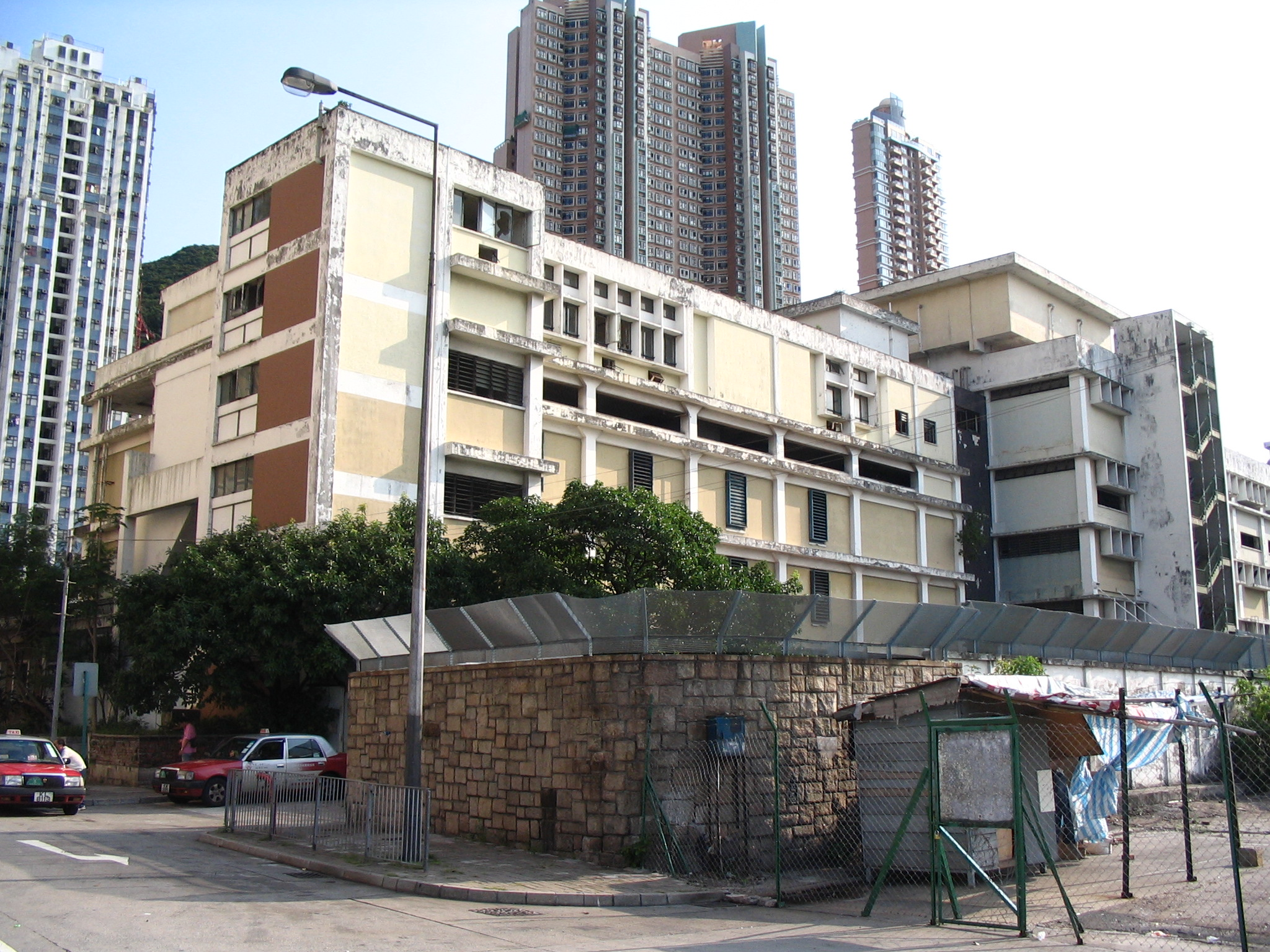
Kennedy Town Abattoir in 2007

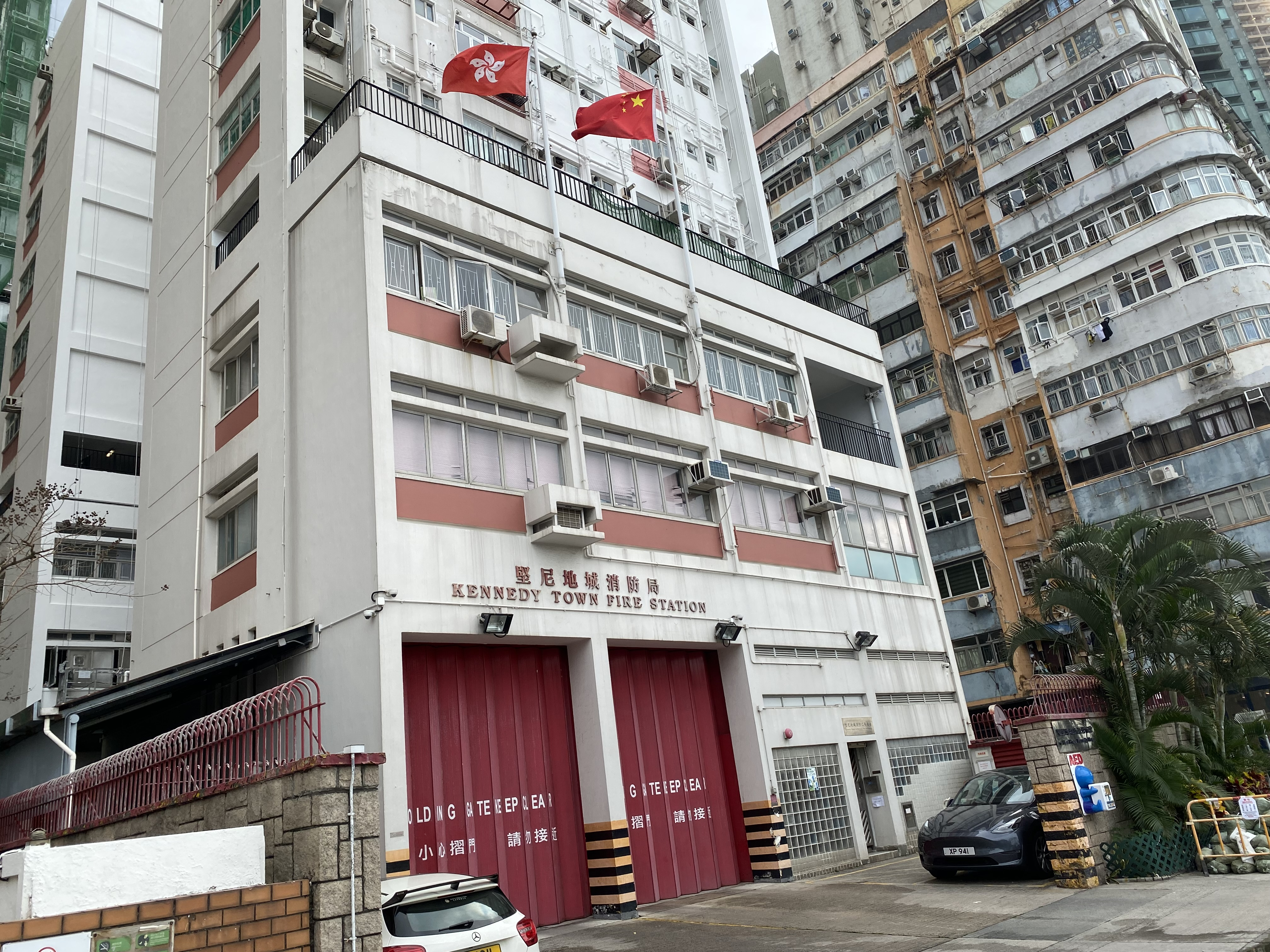
Kennedy Town Fire Station along New Praya, Kennedy Town

New Praya, Kennedy Town (Chinese: 堅彌地城新海旁), also known as Kennedy Town New Praya or New Praya (新海旁街), is a seaside street in Kennedy Town, Hong Kong Island, connected to Sands Street in the east and Cadogan Street in the west. It is a one-way eastbound road. After the reclamation of Belcher Bay, the New Praya, Kennedy Town replaced Catchick Street and became the new promenade in Victoria Harbour West.

== Features along the street ==
Residential buildings

- Manhattan Heights
- The Merton

Public facilities

- Catchick Street Garden
- Kennedy Town (Belcher Bay) Bus Terminus
- Kennedy Town Fire Station
- Kennedy Town Slaughterhouses (demolished)

== Intersecting roads ==
- Cadogan Street (加多近街)
- Davis Street
- Smithfield
- Shing Sai Road (城西道)
- Sands Street

== Seaside ==
The New Praya, Kennedy Town and the sidewalk next to the Shing Sai Road Bus Terminus are great places to view Victoria Harbour, Green Island, Stonecutters Bridge, Tsing Yi Island and West Kowloon.

As the seawall at Kennedy Town is perpendicular to the sea surface, the waves hitting the shore can create huge splashes and wet the people watching the scenery on the shore. When typhoons hit Hong Kong, some citizens would go to the street to experience the power of the typhoon and watch the waves. The street was also one of the hot spots for TV stations to report live news.

With the re-opening of Hong Kong's border and the dropping of restrictions after the COVID-19 pandemic, the area became a favourite among mainlaind Chinese tourists.

== See also ==
- Praya
- Praya, Kennedy Town
