= KTSP =

KTSP may refer to:

- KTSP, the ICAO code for Tehachapi Municipal Airport, Kern County, California
- Kai Tak Sports Park, an upcoming multi-purpose sports venue in Kai Tak, Hong Kong
- Kennedy Town Swimming Pool, a swimming pool in Kennedy Town, Hong Kong
