= Praya, Kennedy Town =

Road in Kennedy Town, Hong Kong

Coordinates: 22.285105°N 114.131244°E

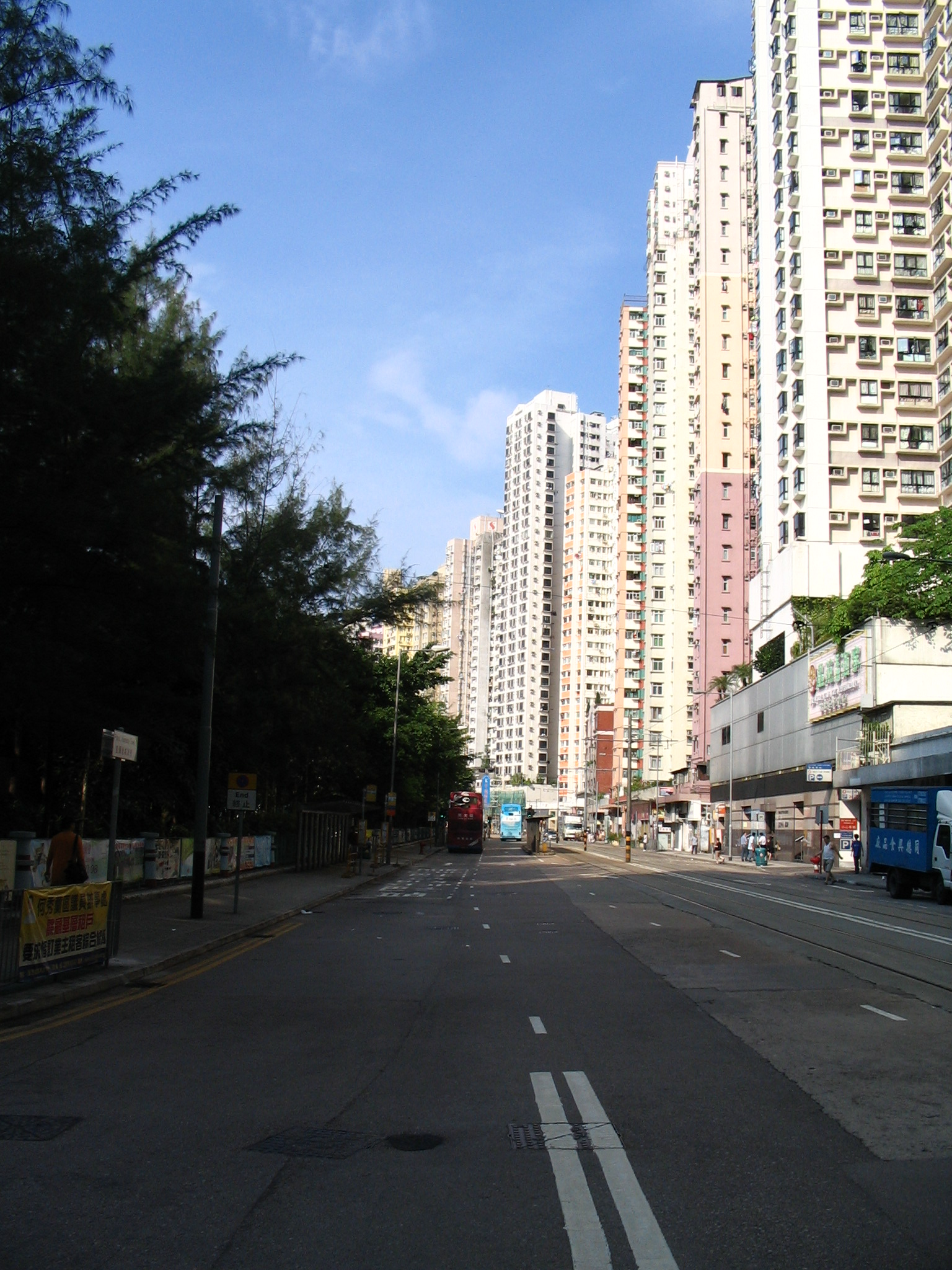
Kennedy Town Praya

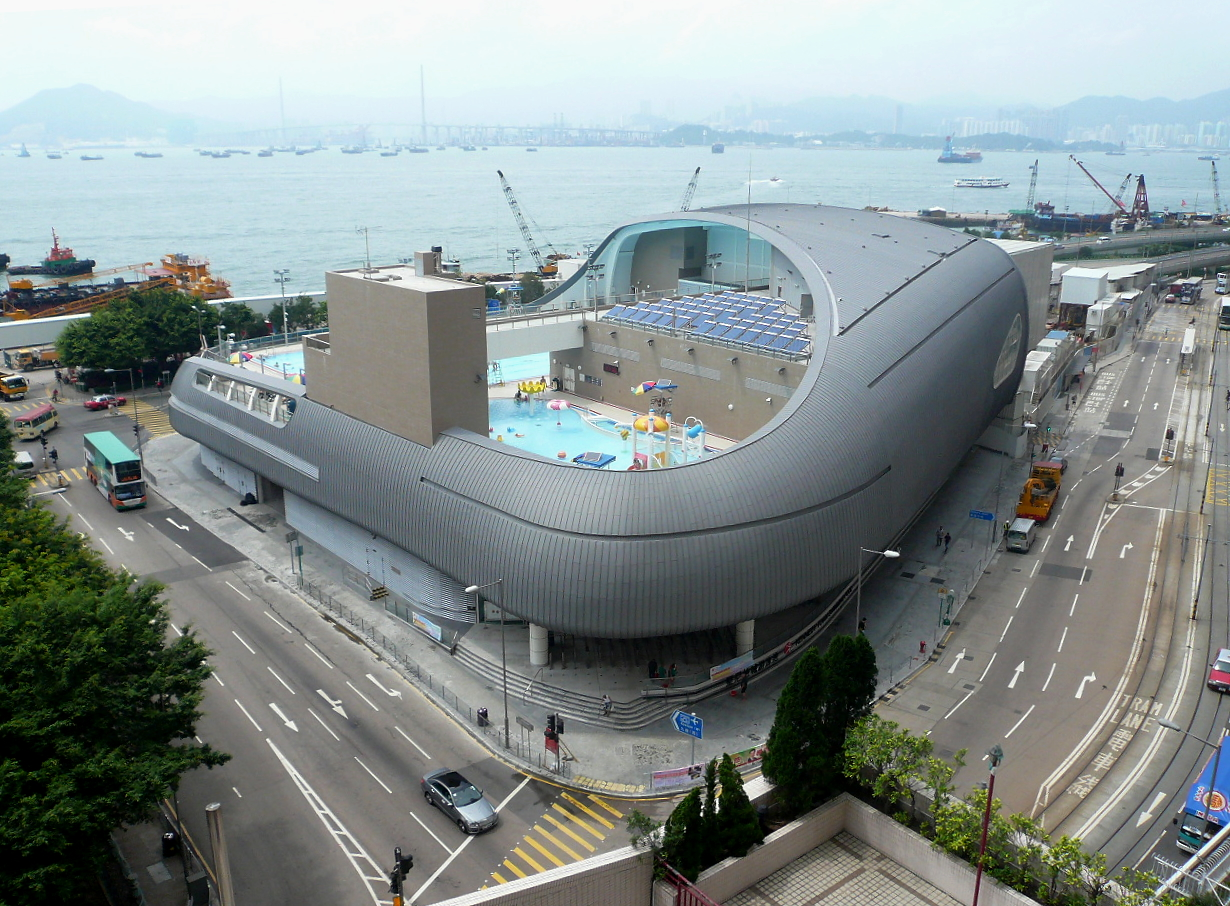
Kennedy Town Swimming Pool along Praya, Kennedy Town (right)

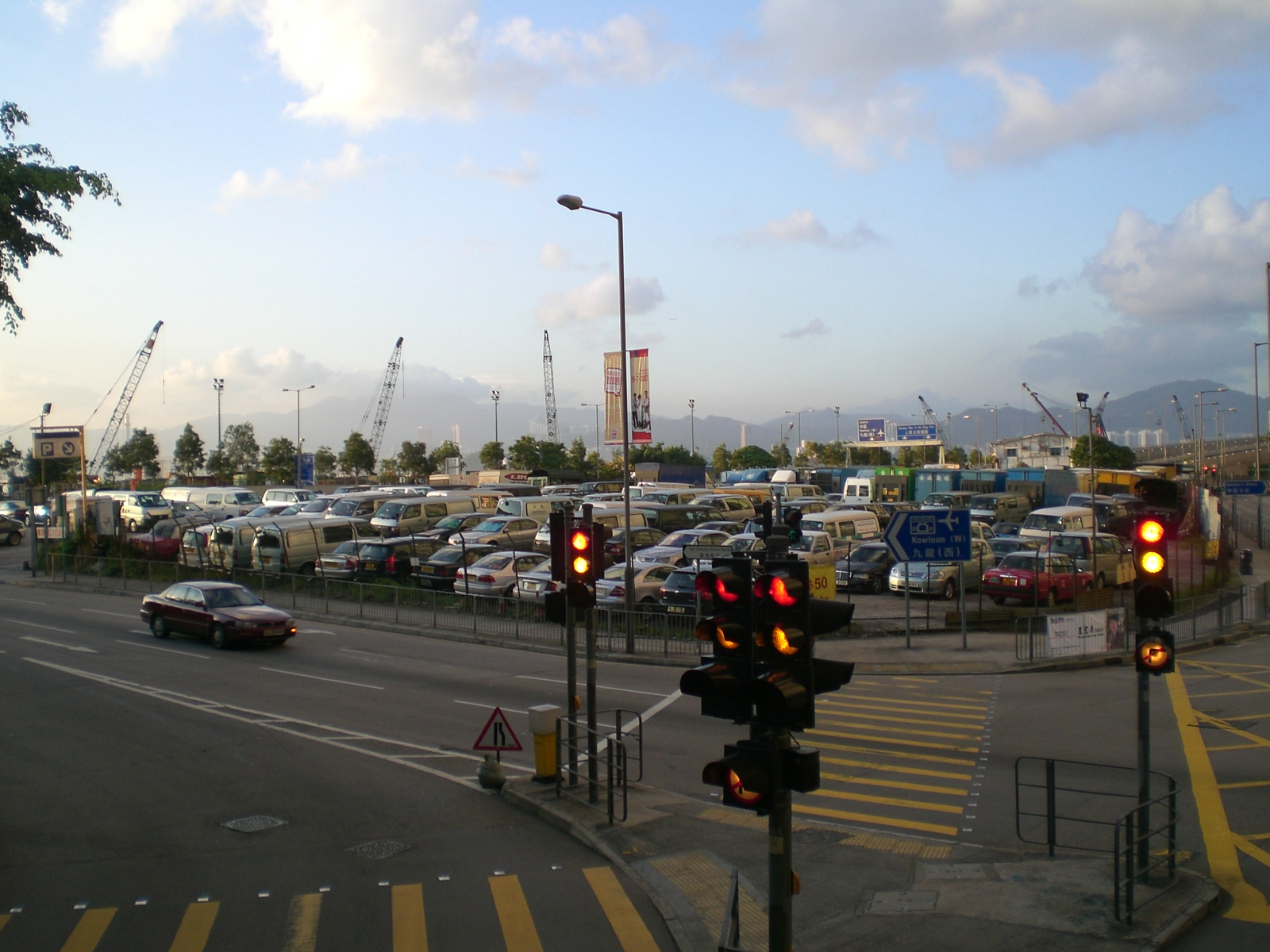
The open-air car park on the Kennedy Town waterfront closed in mid-2009 and is now the site of the Kennedy Town Swimming Pool

Kennedy Town Praya (Chinese: 堅彌地城海旁; Jyutping: gin1 nei4 dei6 sing4 hoi2 pong4) is a road of Kennedy Town on Hong Kong Island. The road is a two-way three-lane road with Hong Kong tram tracks, connecting Des Voeux Road West in the east and the junction of Catchick Street and Sands Street in the west.

== History ==
Before the Belcher Bay reclamation project was carried out, it was a seaside street in Kennedy Town. Since most of the roads along the northern coast of Hong Kong Island were named "Praya" in the early days, a road along the coast of Kennedy Town was called Kennedy Town Praya. "Praya" is not English, but Portuguese, referring to a piece of land by the sea.

Belcher Bay at the western end of Hong Kong Island was named after Captain Edward Belcher, who sailed there in 1841 aboard the British Royal Navy ship HMS Sulphur. Sulphur Channel, between Green Island and Hong Kong Island, was named after his ship, HMS Sulphur. The Chinese name of Belcher Bay was also known as 擸𢶍灣 (laap3 saap3 waan1), lit. 'Garbage Bay or Junk Bay'. Reclamation at Belcher Bay pushed the coastline forward by about 80 metres. The work was completed in 1903, and much of the newly reclaimed land was used as warehouses and Praya, Kennedy Town. In 1904, Hong Kong Tramways was put into service and tracks were laid on the Praya, Kennedy Town.

== Features ==
- Belcher Bay Park (卑路乍灣公園)
- Kennedy Town Swimming Pool

== See also ==
- New Praya, Kennedy Town
