= Catchick Street =

Street in Kennedy Town, Hong Kong

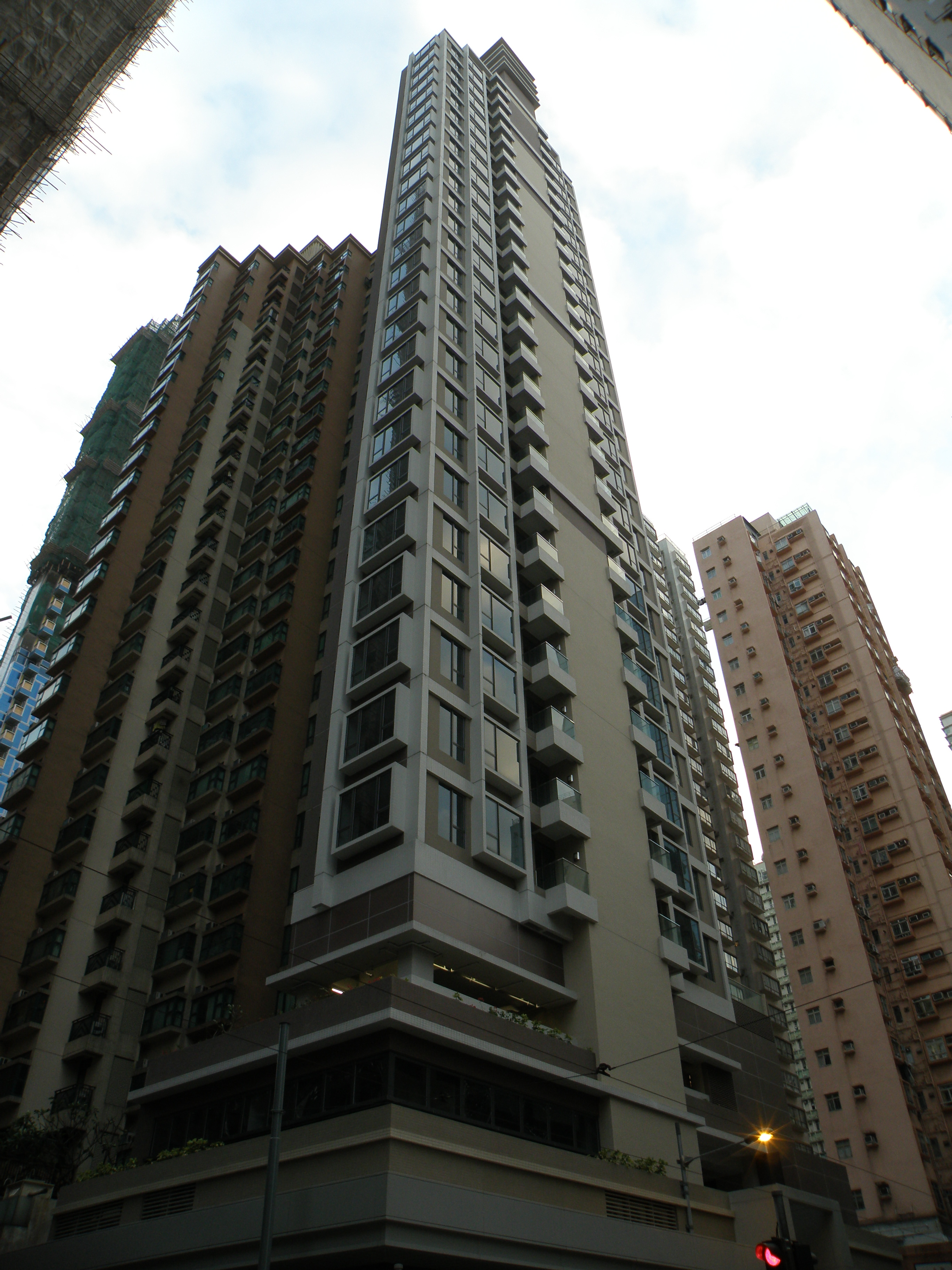
No. 18 Catchick Street

Catchick Street (Chinese: 吉席街; Jyutping: gat1 zik6 gaai1) is a street in the Kennedy Town area of Hong Kong Island, Hong Kong. It is the location of the Hong Kong Tramways' Kennedy Town Terminus. Adjacent to the street is Block 3 of The Merton, a private housing estate jointly developed by the Urban Renewal Authority and New World Development. Catchick Street connects Praya, Kennedy Town (堅彌地城海旁) to the east and Cadogan Street (加多近街) to the west. There are east-west tram lines along the way, so it is also commonly known as the "Tram Road" at the end of the Western District.

== History ==
In 1886, Hong Kong Governor Sir Arthur Edward Kennedy completed a new reclamation project in Belcher Bay, and Catchick Street was built. The reclamation was initiated by Hong Kong businessman Sir Catchick Paul Chater, so the street was named after him. The street was originally called Chater Street, it was later renamed Catchick Street. The name Catchick has two Chinese translation, 吉直 (gat1 zik6) and 吉席 (gat1 zik6), so the Chinese name of the street was first renamed as 吉直街 and then 吉席街 in 1909.。

Before reclamation, Catchick Street was originally the seaside in the north of Western District of Hong Kong Island. The north side of the street was facing the Victoria Harbour and was once one of the hotspots frequented by fishing and photography enthusiasts.

== Nearby places ==
- New Praya, Kennedy Town
- Belcher's Street
- The Merton
- Belcher Bay Park
- The Kennedy Town Abattoir
- Cadogan Street Promenade (加多近街海濱長廊)
- Davis Street
- Smithfield (士美菲路)
- North Street
- Sands Street (山市街)
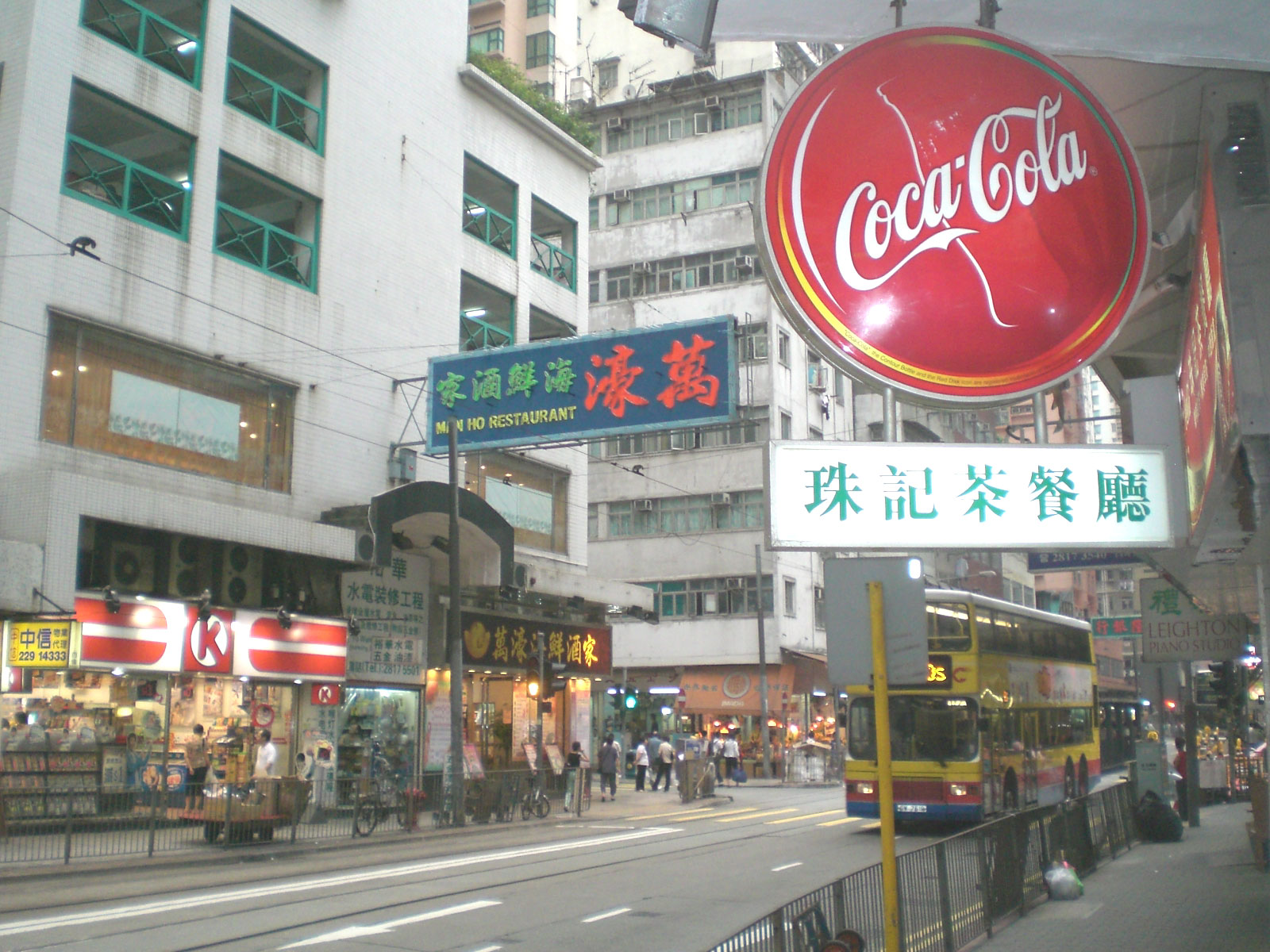
Catchick Street

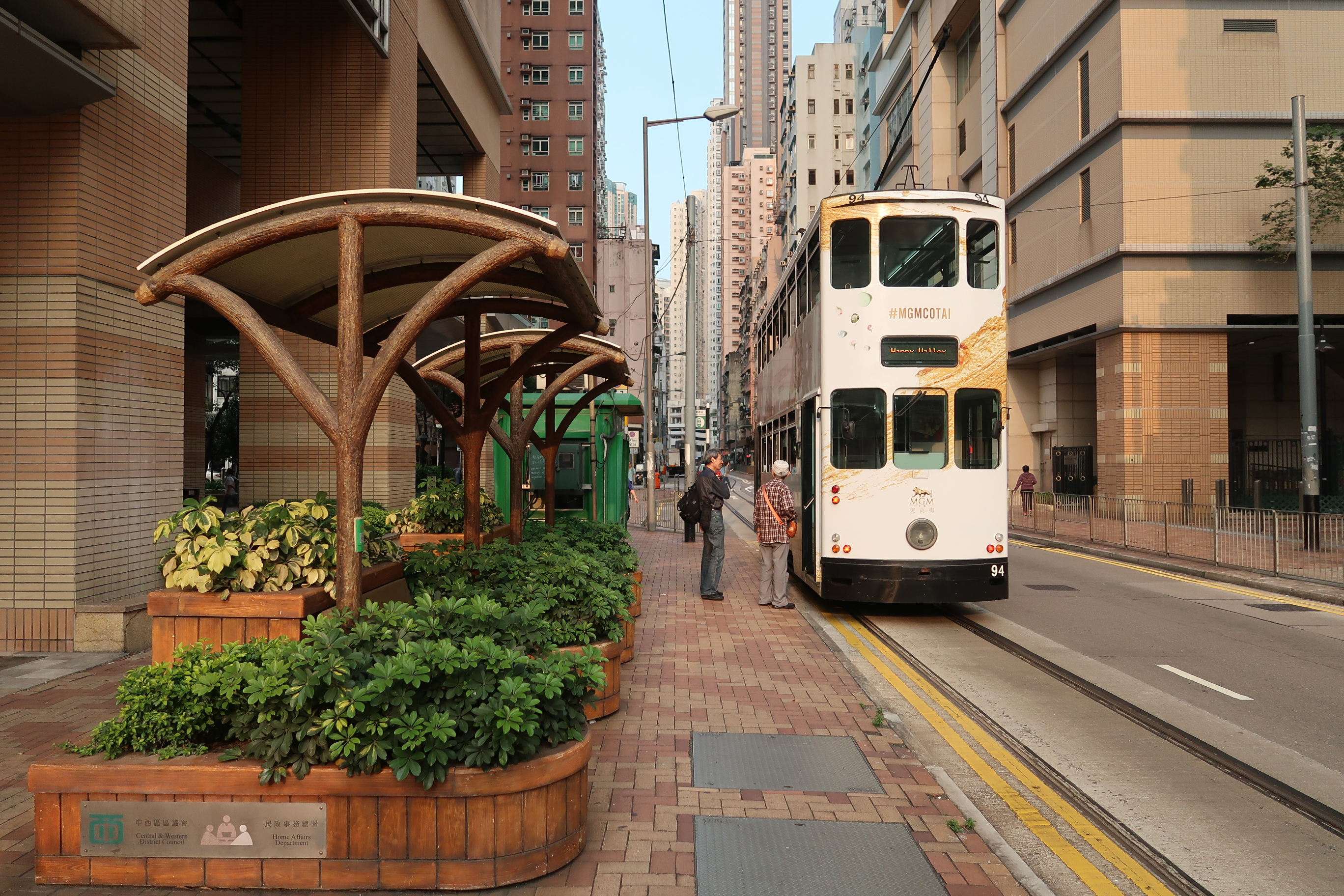
Kennedy Town Terminus on Catchick Street

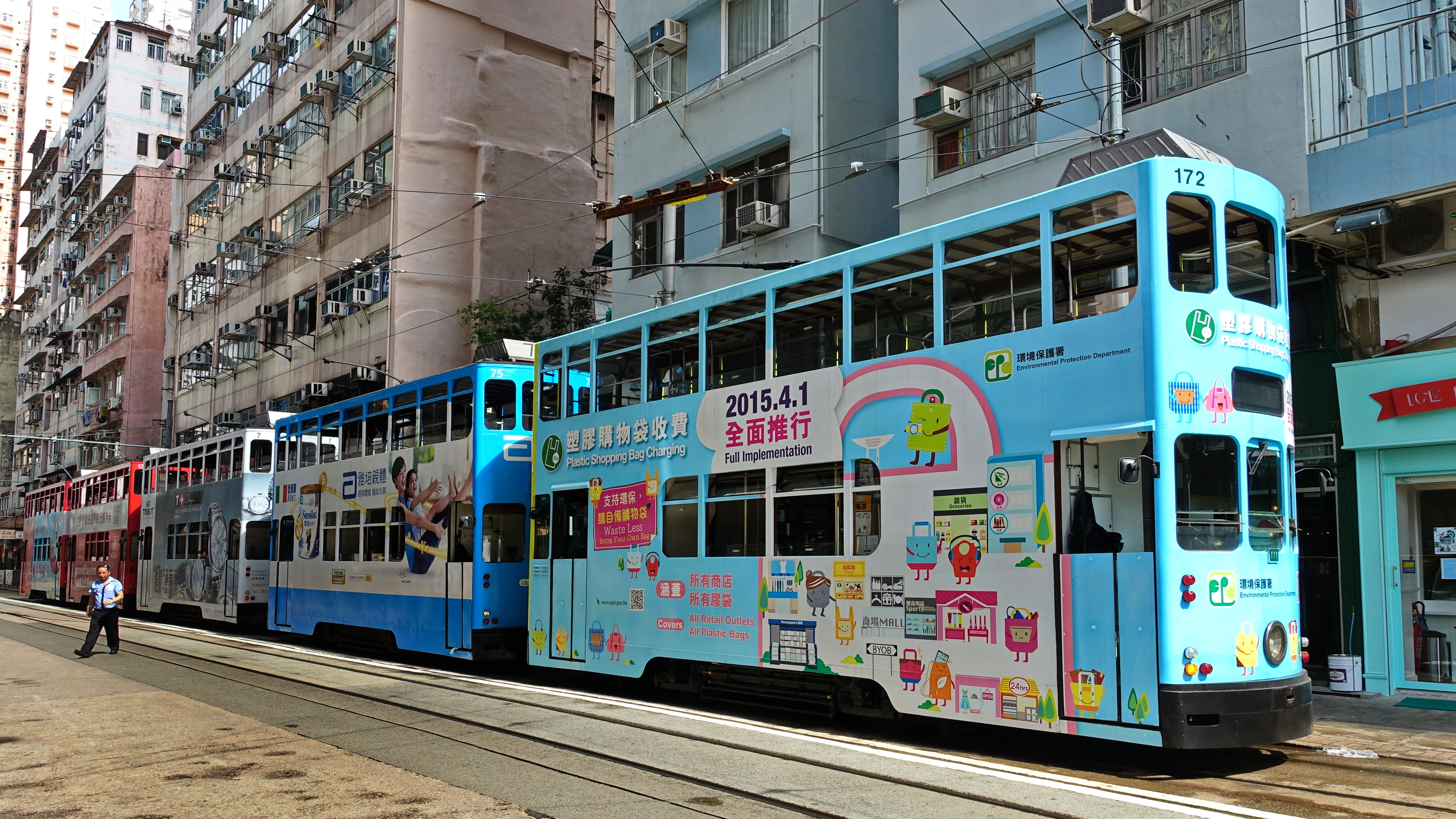
After dropping off passengers at the Davis Street (爹核士街) tram stop, the tram will wait to turn left onto Davis Street, right onto Belcher's Street (卑路乍街), then right onto Cadogan Street (加多近街), and finally turn right back to the Kennedy Town terminus at Catchick Street to pick up passengers.
