= Kennedy Town =

Kennedy Town 堅尼地城
- Neighbourhood
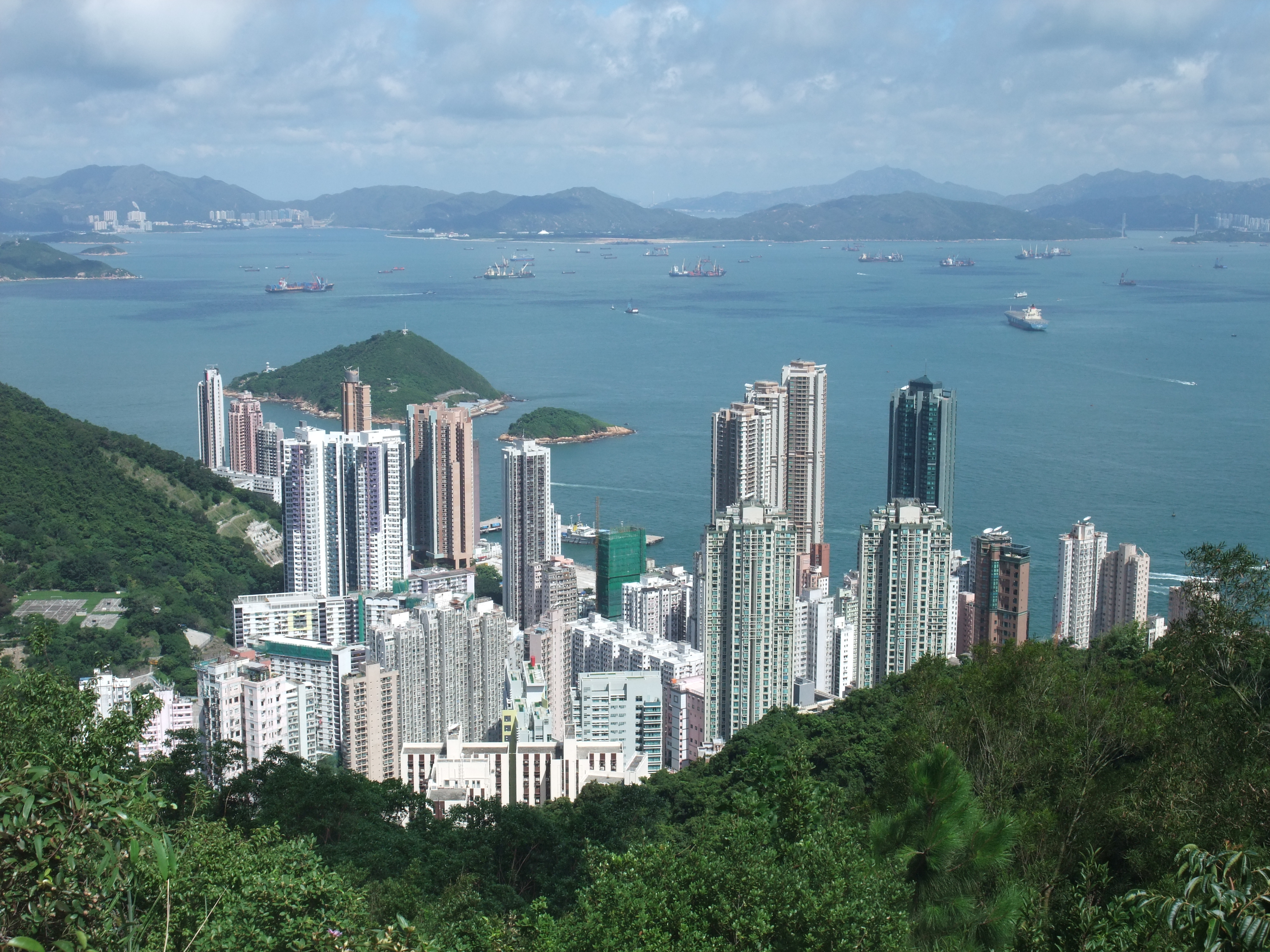
- Kennedy Town, situated in between Mount Davis and Lung Fu Shan in July 2009
- Nickname: K Town
- Interactive map of Kennedy Town
- Coordinates: 22.280°N 114.125°E
- Special Administrative Region: Hong Kong
- District: Central and Western
- Area: Sai Wan
- District: Central and Western District

Population (2016)
  - Total: 54,000 (together with Mount Davis)

Kennedy Town
- Traditional Chinese: 堅尼地城
- Simplified Chinese: 坚尼地城
- Jyutping: Gin^{1} nei^{4} dei^{6} seng^{4}
Transcriptions
Standard Mandarin
- Hanyu Pinyin: Jiānnídìchéng
Yue: Cantonese
- Yale Romanization: Gīn nèih deih sèhng
- Jyutping: Gin^{1} nei^{4} dei^{6} seng^{4}

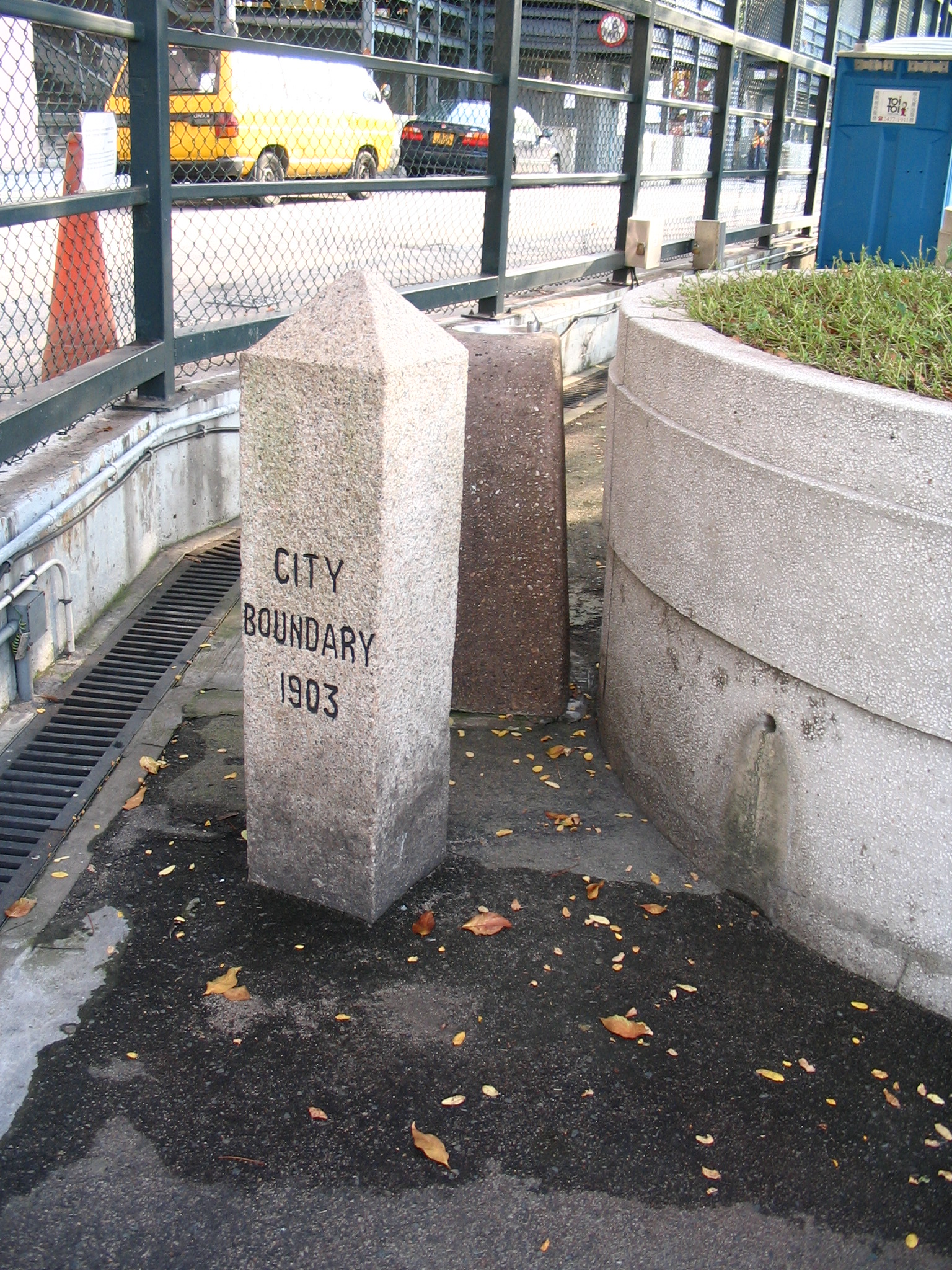
Victoria City boundary stone at Sai Ning Street in September 2007

Kennedy Town is a town and neighbourhood at the western end of Sai Wan on Hong Kong Island in Hong Kong. It was named after Arthur Edward Kennedy, the 7th governor of Hong Kong from 1872 to 1877. Administratively, it is part of Central and Western District.

Due to its distance from major commercial cores and longtime inaccessibility by train, urban development in this area was less vigorous than in other parts of urban Hong Kong. But since the MTR was extended to the area in 2014, it began rapidly gentrifying, with many older businesses, such as vehicle repair workshops and cha chaan tengs, making way for new luxury developments, as well as high-end bars and restaurants.

== Geography ==
Kennedy Town occupies the northwestern part of Hong Kong Island. It is bordered by the Belcher Bay of Victoria Harbour to the north, by Sulphur Channel to the west, Shek Tong Tsui to the east and Mount Davis and Lung Fu Shan to the south.

Historically, the district's western limit was legally defined as the western boundary of the City of Victoria. However, post-war development south of the boundary – Kennedy Town Service Reservoir Playground, Shun Hing College, Smithfield Garden, Mei Wah Mansion, Wah Fai House, and west of the boundary – Serene Court, The Sail at Victoria, and Island West Transfer Station, are all widely considered part of Kennedy Town. Kennedy Town Service Reservoir Playground, Lap Chee College of Shun Hing College, Block A of Smithfield Garden, Wah Fai House, and Serene Court straddle the boundary of Victoria. Since the borders of Kennedy Town have not officially been redefined, the above properties are technically either partly or entirely outside of Kennedy Town. The eastern boundary was not de jure defined but nevertheless de facto formerly defined as the alley between Belcher Court and Nam Hung Mansion. The border is also evidenced by the bend in the street grid, of which the alley is the axis. Due to the lack of space to relocate the Kennedy Town Swimming Pool for the Kennedy Town station, it had to be moved to Shek Tong Tsui. As a result, the border was de facto redefined as Collinson Street. Phase I of the Kennedy Town Swimming Pool is in Kennedy Town while Phase II is in Shek Tong Tsui. The elderly home in front of The Belcher's, Jockey Club Student Village I, and the Centennial Campus are in Kennedy Town, while The Belcher's itself and the part of The University of Hong Kong from the Chow Yei Ching Building to The Kadoorie Biological Sciences Building are in Shek Tong Tsui.

In 1886, when Arthur Edward Kennedy was governor, land was reclaimed along the coast of Kennedy Town. It formed a narrow coastal strip of land that included the Kennedy Praya and the coastal area from Beach Street via Collinson Street to Shek Tong Tsui. Additional land was reclaimed along the coast of Kennedy Town between 1933 and 1939, but works were suspended before the Battle of Hong Kong in 1941. Further reclamation was conducted at the end of the 20th century.

For district council elections purposes, the area roughly corresponds to the "Kennedy Town and Mount Davis", "Kwun Lung" and "Sai Wan" constituencies. The boundaries of such constituencies may be subject to modification.

== History ==
Kennedy Town is the western section of the historical Victoria City. In 1903, the Hong Kong Government erected seven boundary stones for the city, inscribed "City Boundary 1903". One of them is located next to the Kennedy Town Temporary Recreation Ground at Sai Ning Street (西寧街). During the Japanese occupation, Kennedy Town was renamed Sannodai (山王台).

== Features ==
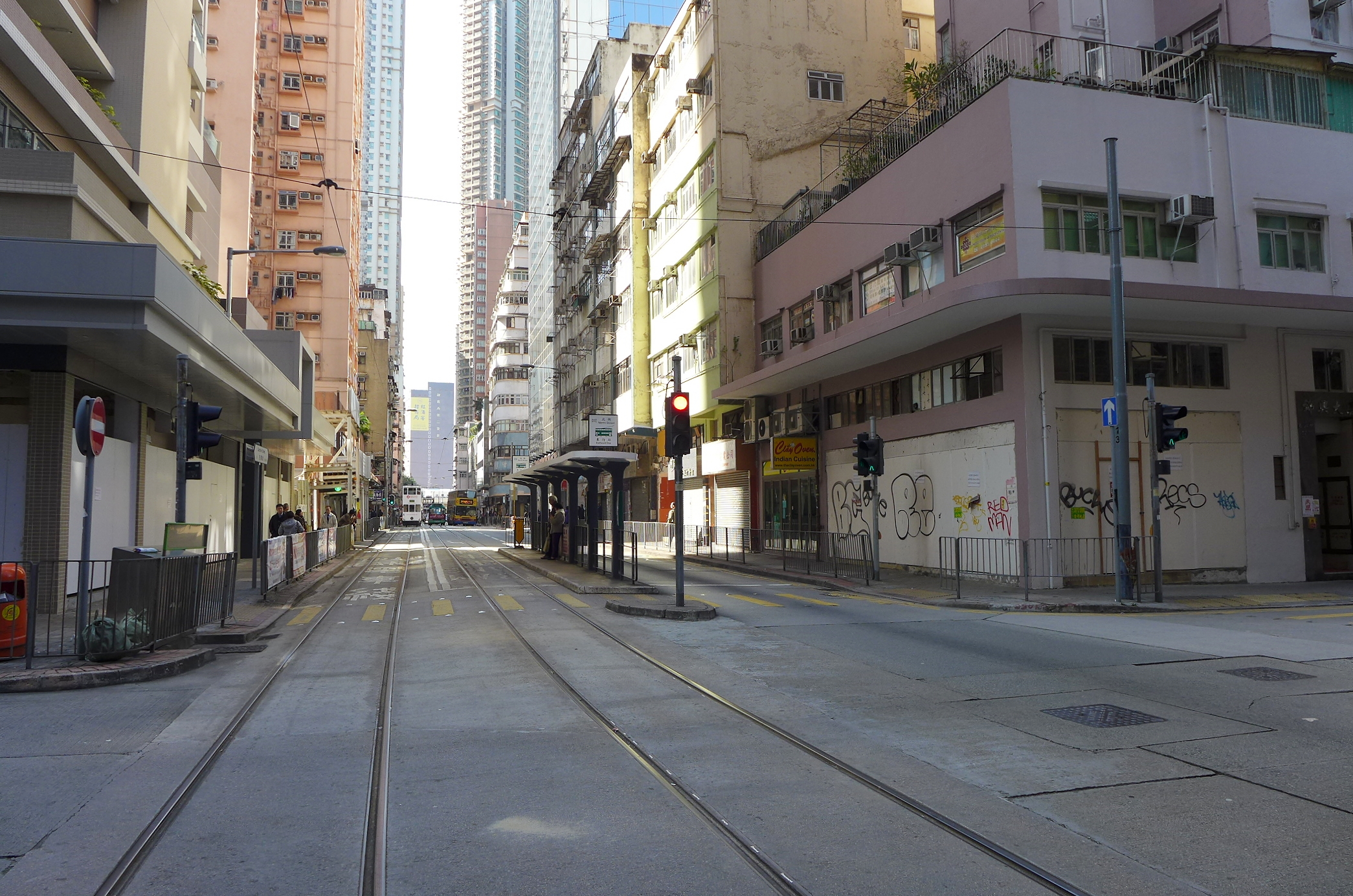
Catchick Street in December 2014

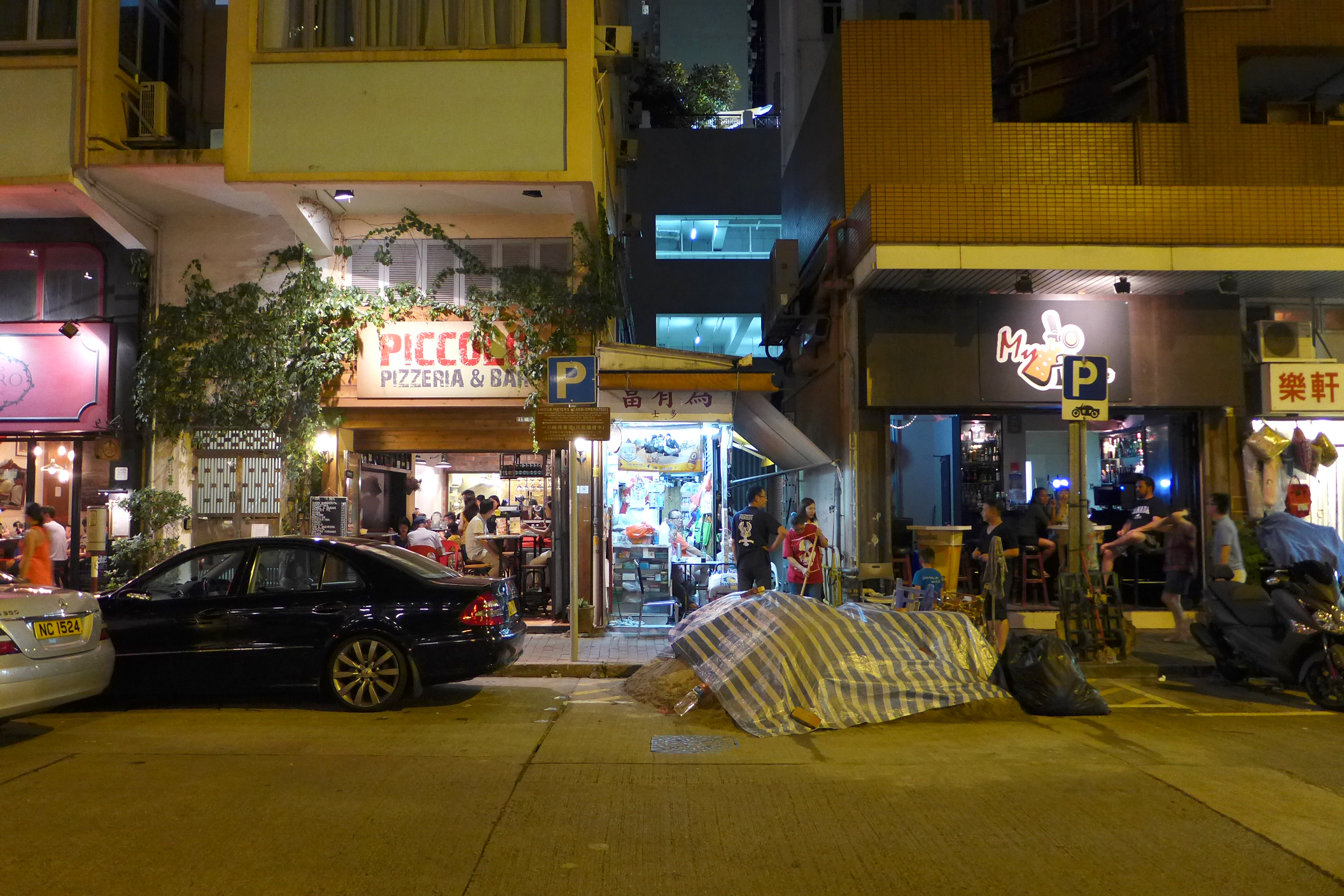
Davis Street has more bars and western restaurants after the MTR expanded to Kennedy Town in 2014. Taken in July 2016.

=== Streets ===
Streets in Kennedy Town include:

- Belcher's Street
- Catchick Street (吉席街). Named after Sir Catchick Paul Chater, it was named "Chater Street" until 1909, and was renamed to avoid confusion with the street in Central.
- Davis Street
- Forbes Street
- Sands Street
- Hau Wo Street
- Ka Wai Man Road
- Kennedy Town Praya (堅彌地城海旁)
- New Praya, Kennedy Town (堅彌地城新海旁)
- North Street
- Pokfield Road (蒲飛路)
- Smithfield
- Victoria Road

=== Housing ===
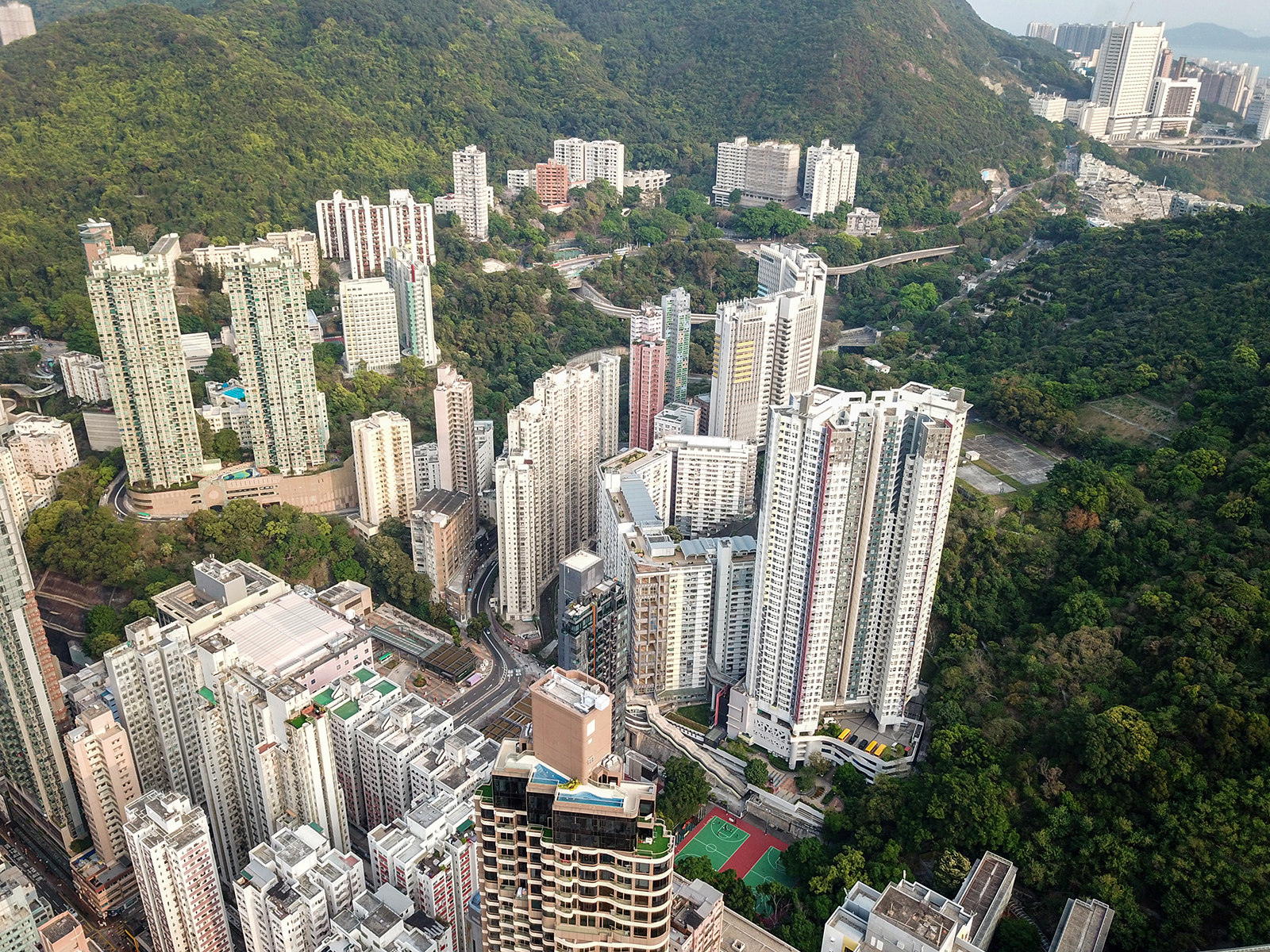
Private housing and Kwun Lung Lau in March 2018

Two of the earliest public housing estates of Hong Kong are located in Kennedy Town: Sai Wan Estate, completed in 1958, and Kwun Lung Lau, built in 1967. More recent luxury residential developments include, The Merton, completed in 2005, which is a high-rise private housing development in the area, as well as Manhattan Heights completed in the year 2000. There are approximately 138 developments in the area.

Following the new MTR extension, new land for potential property developments in the district is in high demand. In a District Council meeting concerning the development of west Kennedy Town in March 2015, the proposed rezoning plan gained general support despite some expressing their worries about the community's carrying capacity. Outlined areas to be rezoned and redeveloped include the ex-Mount Davis cottage area on Victoria Road, the Hong Kong Academy temporary campus and former Police Married Officers Quarters on Ka Wai Man Road, as well as the ex-Kennedy Town Incinerator and Abattoir site on Cadogan Street. The project is expected to provide about 3,000 public and private residential units. For the long-discussed redevelopment project regarding the district's half-century-old buildings, the Housing Authority admitted they have no plans to implement it after considering the costs and effects to rebuild and relocate, which will foreseeably increase the public housing burden.

=== Historic buildings ===
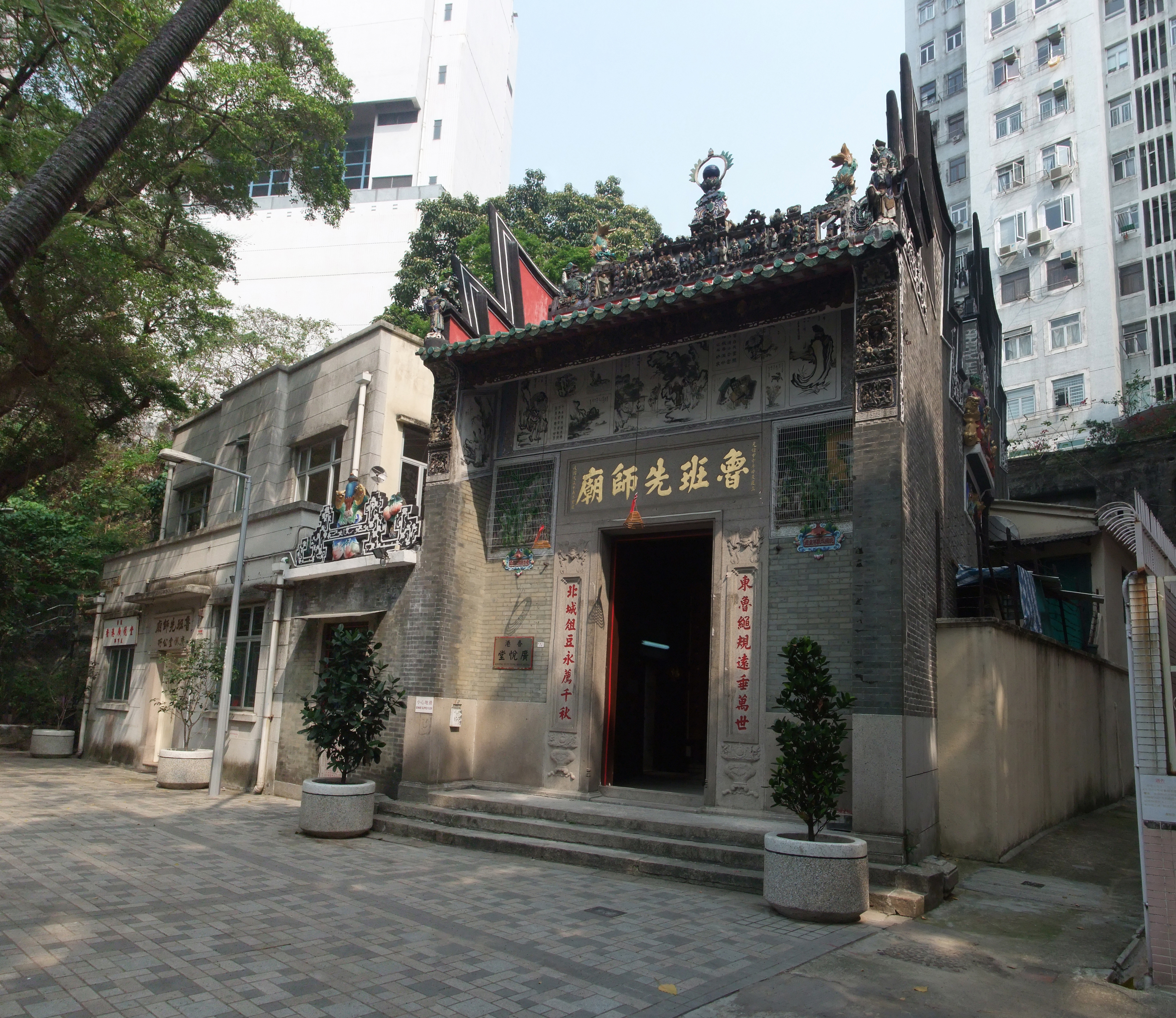
Lo Pan Temple in May 2008

Historic buildings and places in Kennedy Town include:

- Lo Pan Temple, a Grade I historic building
- Elliot Pumping Station & Filters Senior Staff Quarters, No. 77 Pok Fu Lam Road, a Grade II historic building
- Elliot Pumping Station & Filters Workmen's Quarters, a Grade III historic building
- Elliot Pumping Station & Filters, Treatment Works Building, a Grade III historic building
- Ex-Western Fire Station, No. 12 Belcher's Street, a Grade III historic building. Converted into the Po Leung Kuk Chan Au Big Yan Home for the Elderly.

=== Facilities ===
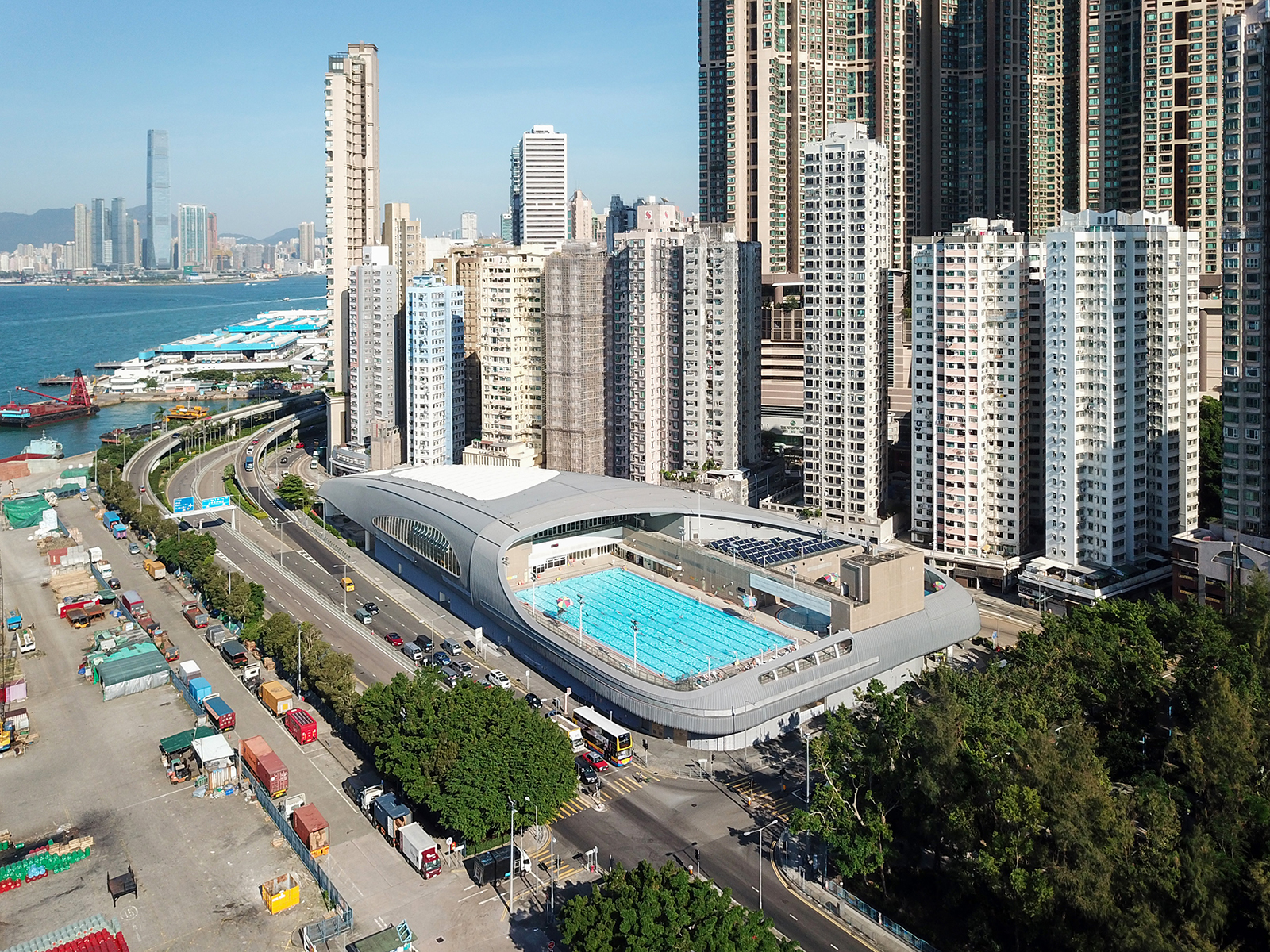
Kennedy Town Swimming Pool in October 2018

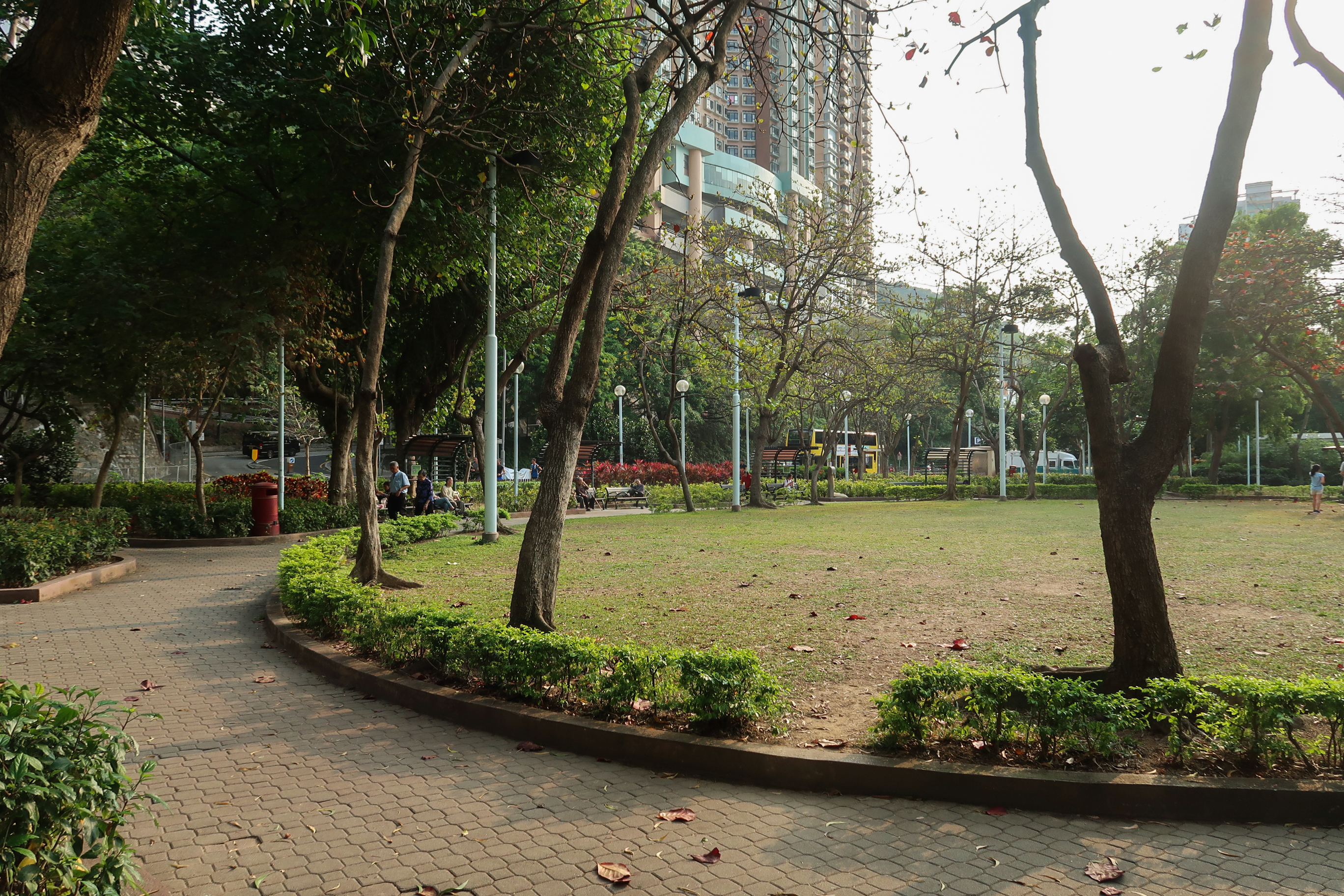
Cadogan Street Temporary Garden in March 2018

- Smithfield Municipal Services Building (士美菲路市政大廈), located at 12K Smithfield, at the corner with Rock Hill Street.
- Kennedy Town Community Complex, located at 12 Rock Hill Street, adjacent to Smithfield Municipal Services Building. The 16-storey building was completed in May 2006 and won a Certificate of Merit in the 2006 Design Award Scheme.
- Kennedy Town Swimming Pool, located at 2 Sai Cheung Street North, next to Belcher Bay Park. It opened on 11 May 2011, replacing the swimming pool at Smithfield, demolished to facilitate the construction of Kennedy Town station.
- Cadogan Street Temporary Garden.
- Kennedy Town Fire Station, located at the northern end of Smithfield, at the corner with New Praya.
- Victoria Public Mortuary, located at 34 Victoria Road.

=== Parks ===
- Belcher Bay Park
- Cadogan Street Temporary Park
- Forbes Street Temporary Playground
- Instagram Pier
- Kennedy Town Temporary Recreation Ground at Sai Ning Street

== Demographics ==
The neighbourhood is primarily Chinese, but a growing number of expats are moving into a number of luxury buildings built along the waterfront.

== Transport ==
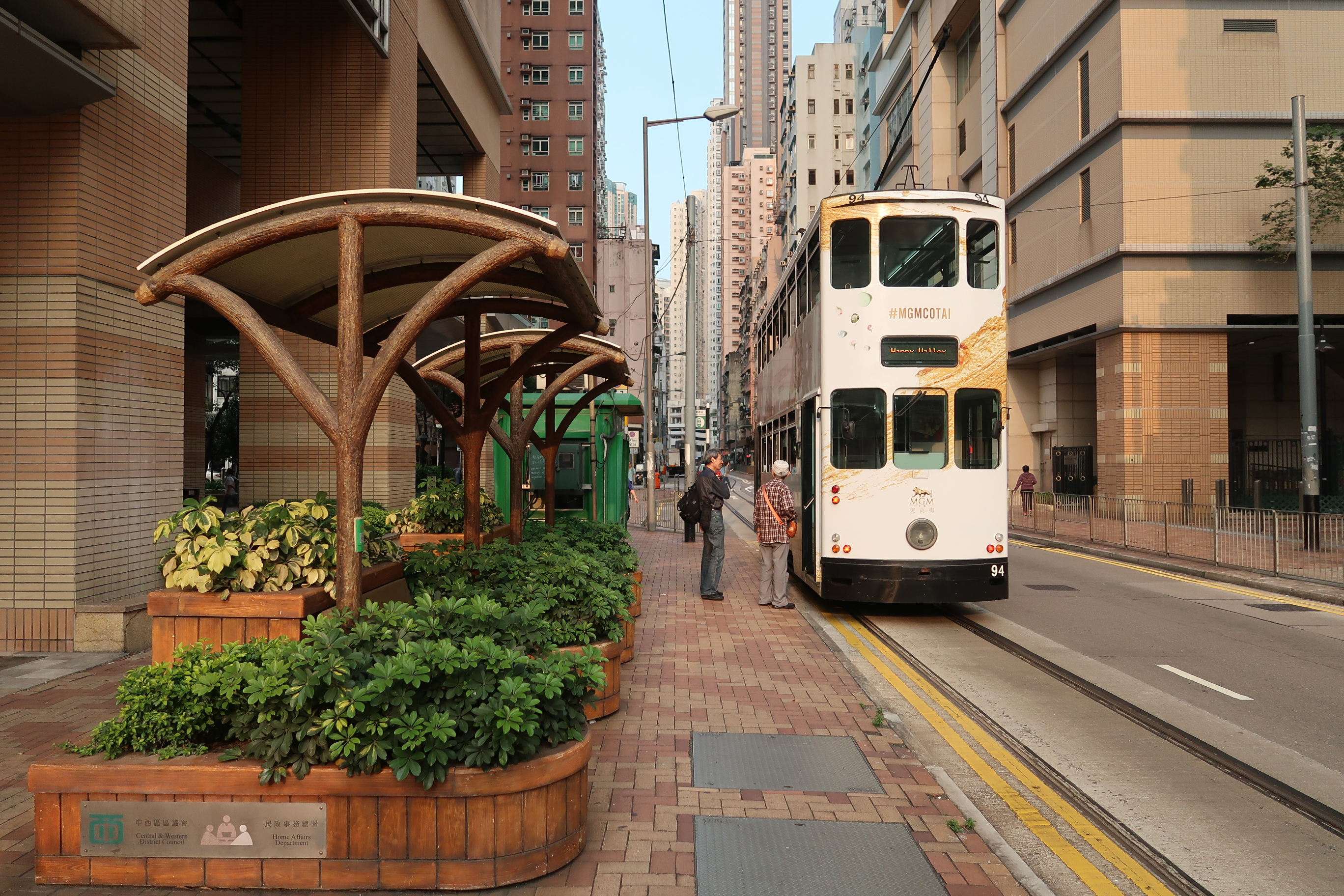
Western head of the Hong Kong Tramways line, next to The Merton in Catchick Street in March 2018.

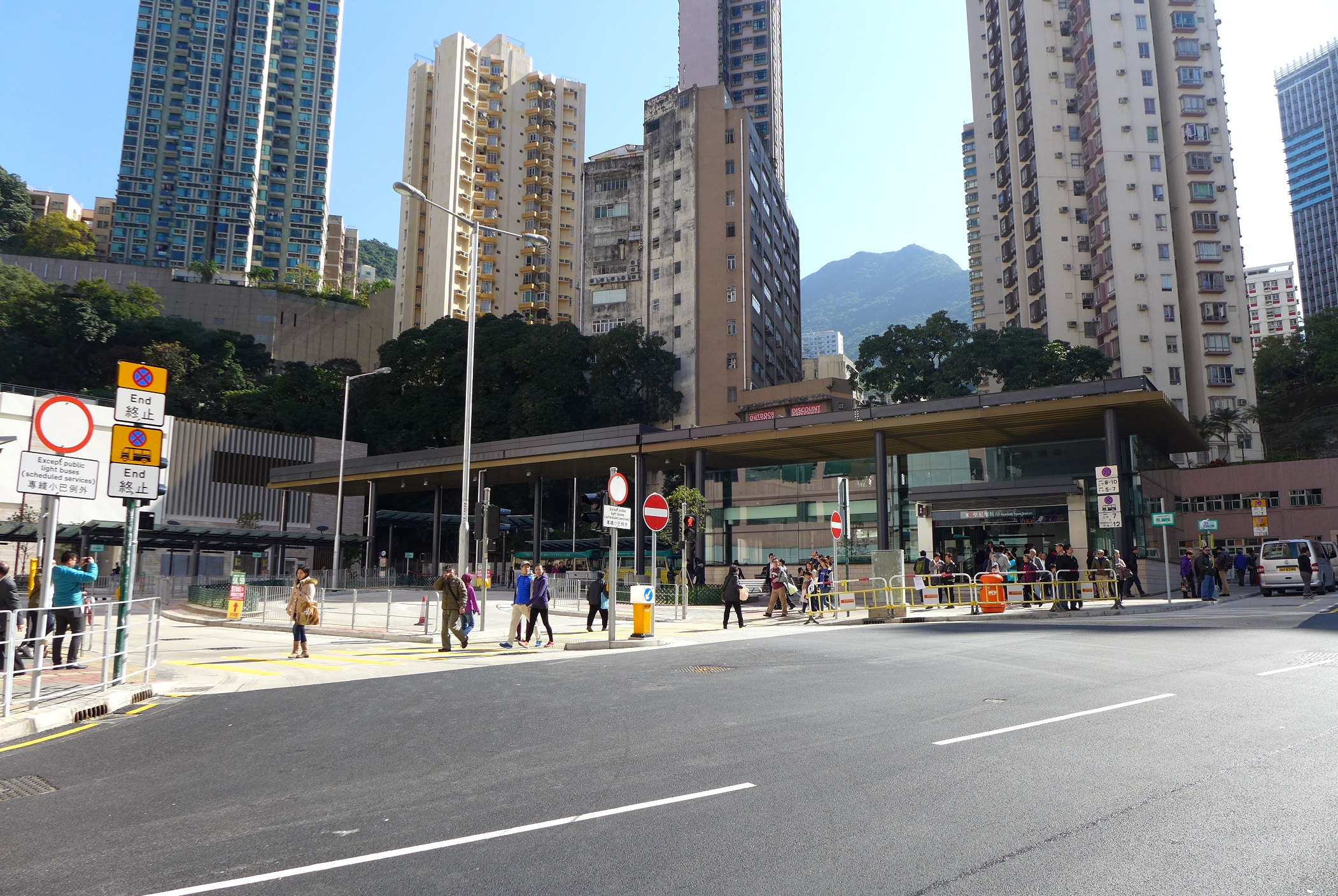
MTR Kennedy Town station in December 2014

The western terminus of the Hong Kong Tramways is located in Kennedy Town next to The Merton in Catchick Street.

Kennedy Town is also served by Kennedy Town station, opened in 2014 as part of an extension of the Island line of the Mass Transit Railway (MTR).

== Education ==
Kennedy Town is in Primary One Admission (POA) School Net 11. Within the school net are multiple aided schools (operated independently but funded with government money) and the following government schools: Bonham Road Government Primary School and Li Sing Primary School (李陞小學).

Hong Kong Public Libraries operates the Smithfield Library in the Smithfield Municipal Services Building.
