= Manhattan Heights (skyscraper) =

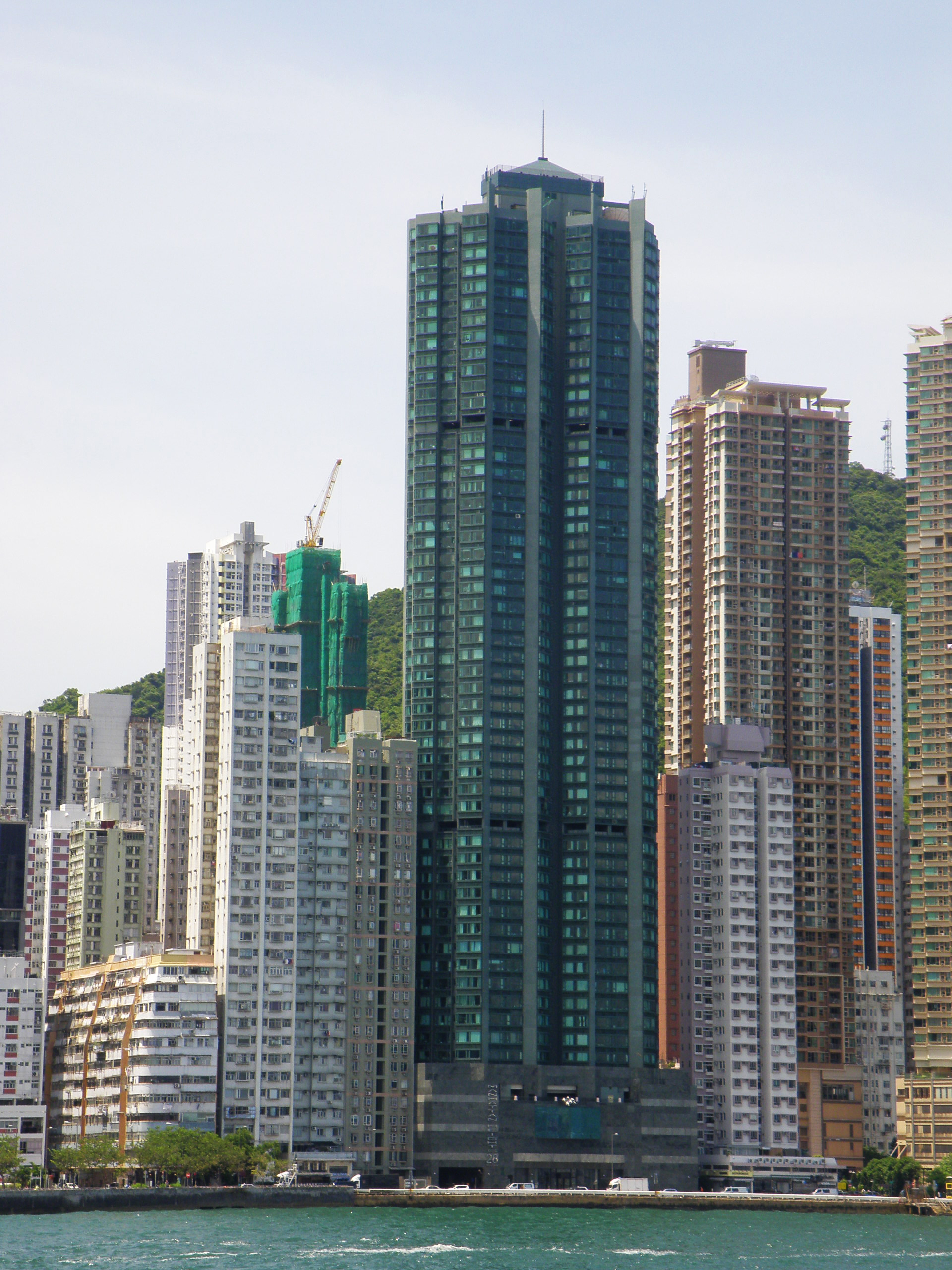
- Interactive map of the Manhattan Heights area

General information
- Status: Completed
- Type: Residential
- Location: 28 New Praya Kennedy Town, Kennedy Town, Hong Kong
- Coordinates: 22°17′01.0″N 114°07′38.3″E
- Opening: 2000; 26 years ago

Height
- Roof: 185 metres (607 ft)

Technical details
- Floor count: 55

Design and construction
- Architect: Hsin Yieh Architects & Associates

Manhattan Heights (Chinese: 高逸華軒) is a residential skyscraper located in Kennedy Town, Hong Kong. Completed in the year 2000, the greenish tower stands 607 ft (185 m) tall and has 55 floors. The architect of this building is SLHO & Associates Ltd.

Part of the building is being operated as a serviced apartment.

== See also ==
- List of tallest buildings in Hong Kong
- New Praya, Kennedy Town
