= Sands Street, Hong Kong =

Street in Hong Kong

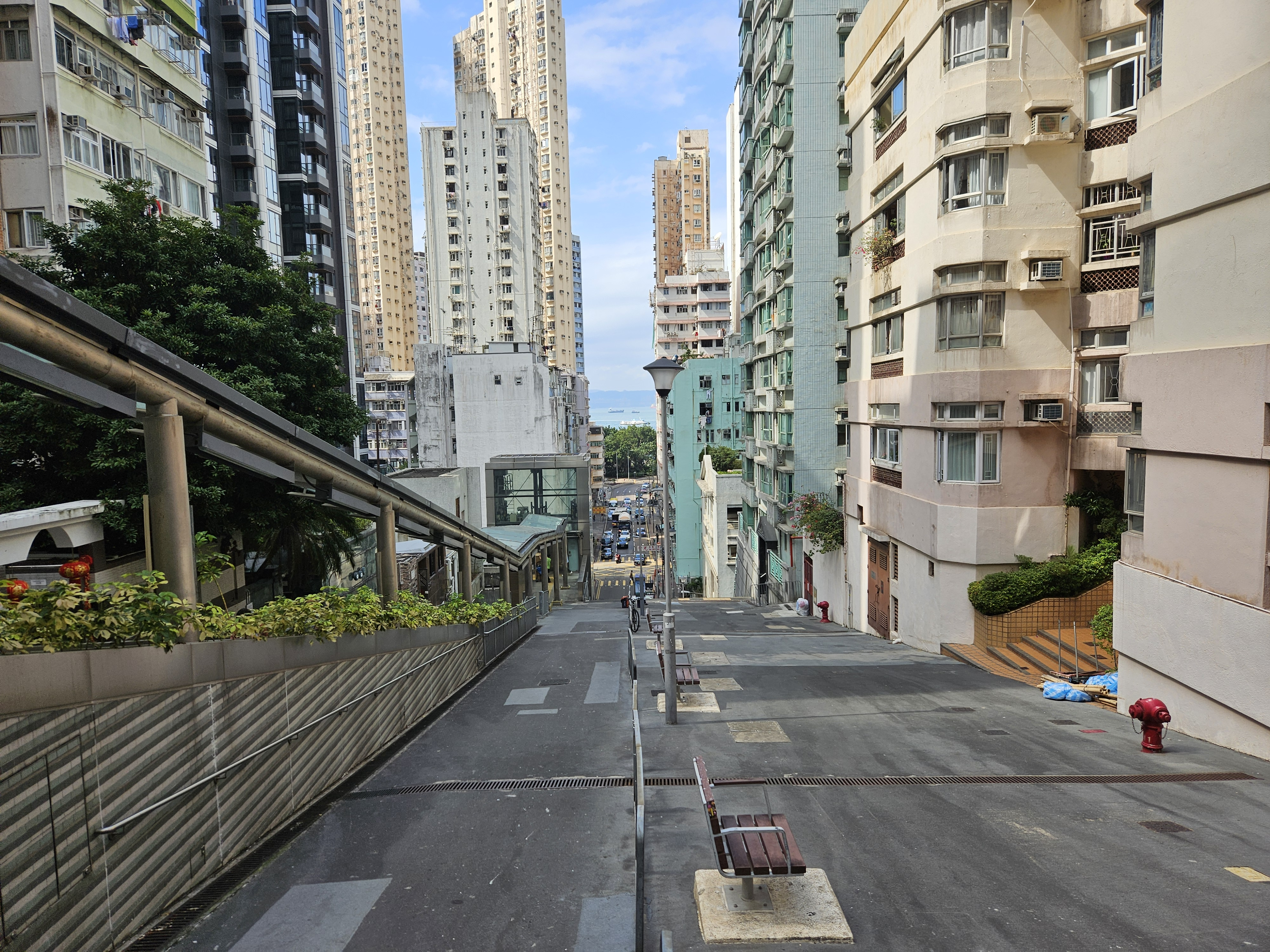
Seats on the pedestrian southern section of Sands Street

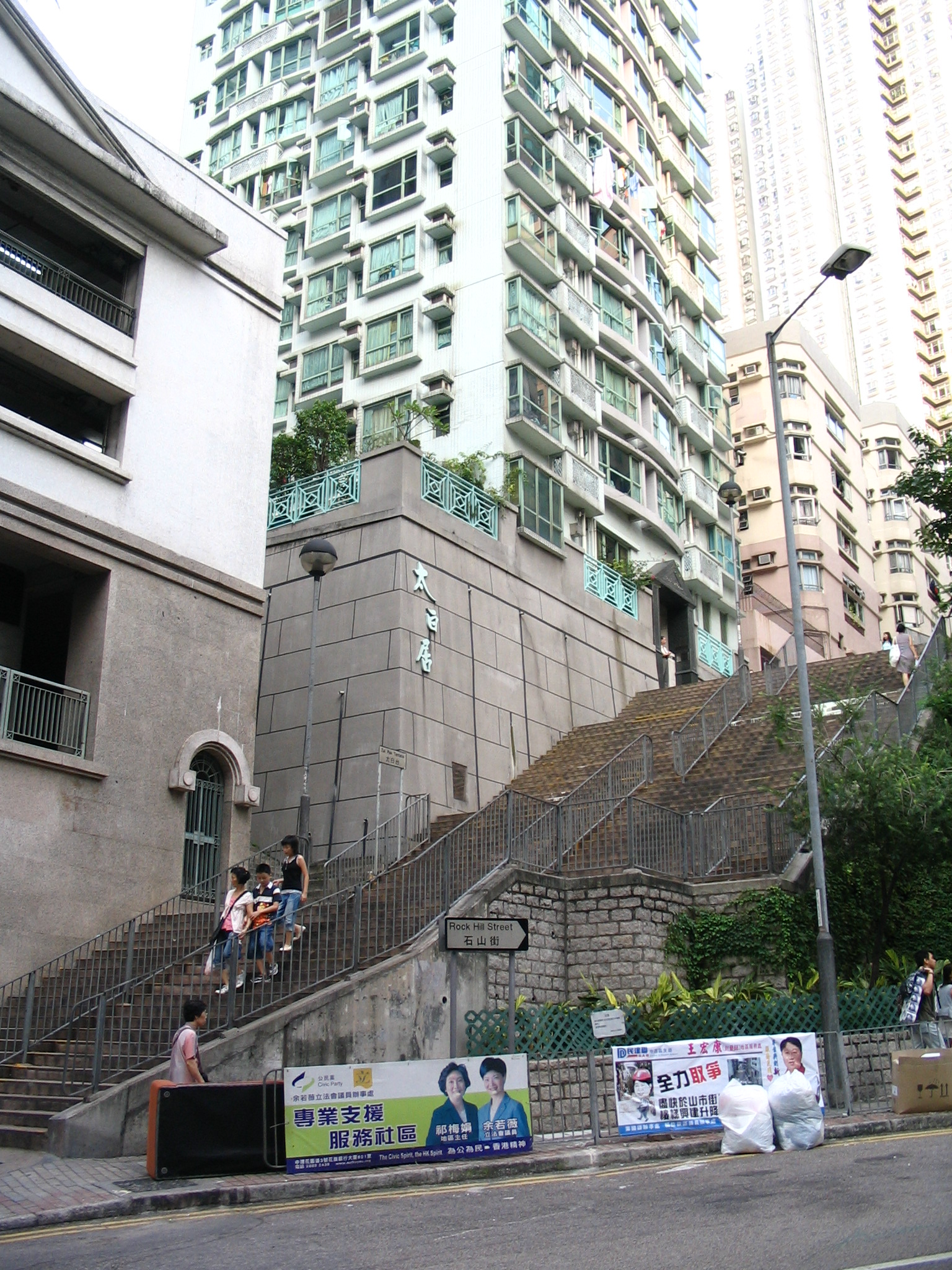
The junction of Sands Street (above) and Rock Hill Street (below)

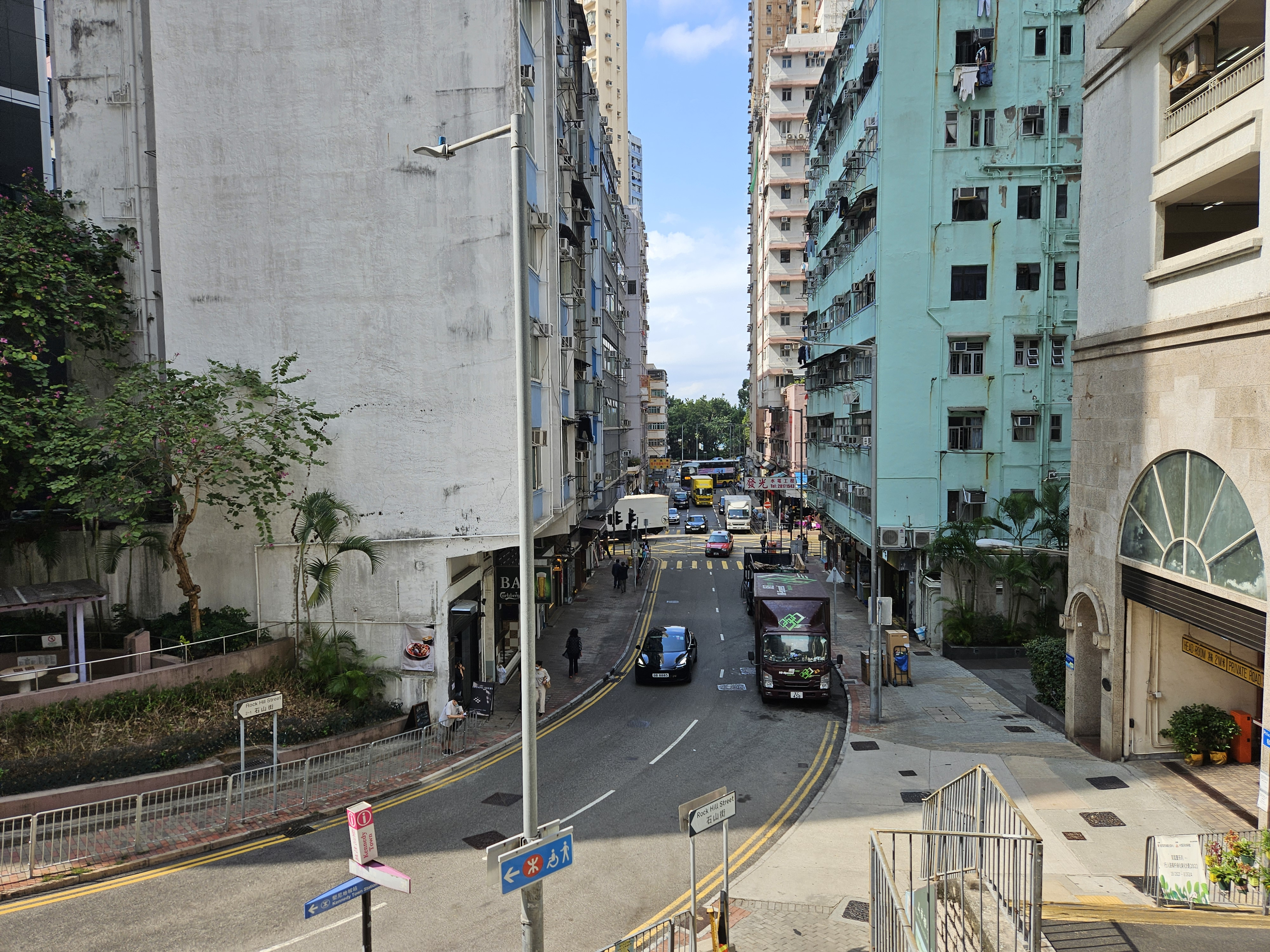
Sands Street (above) at its junction with Rock Hill Street (left)

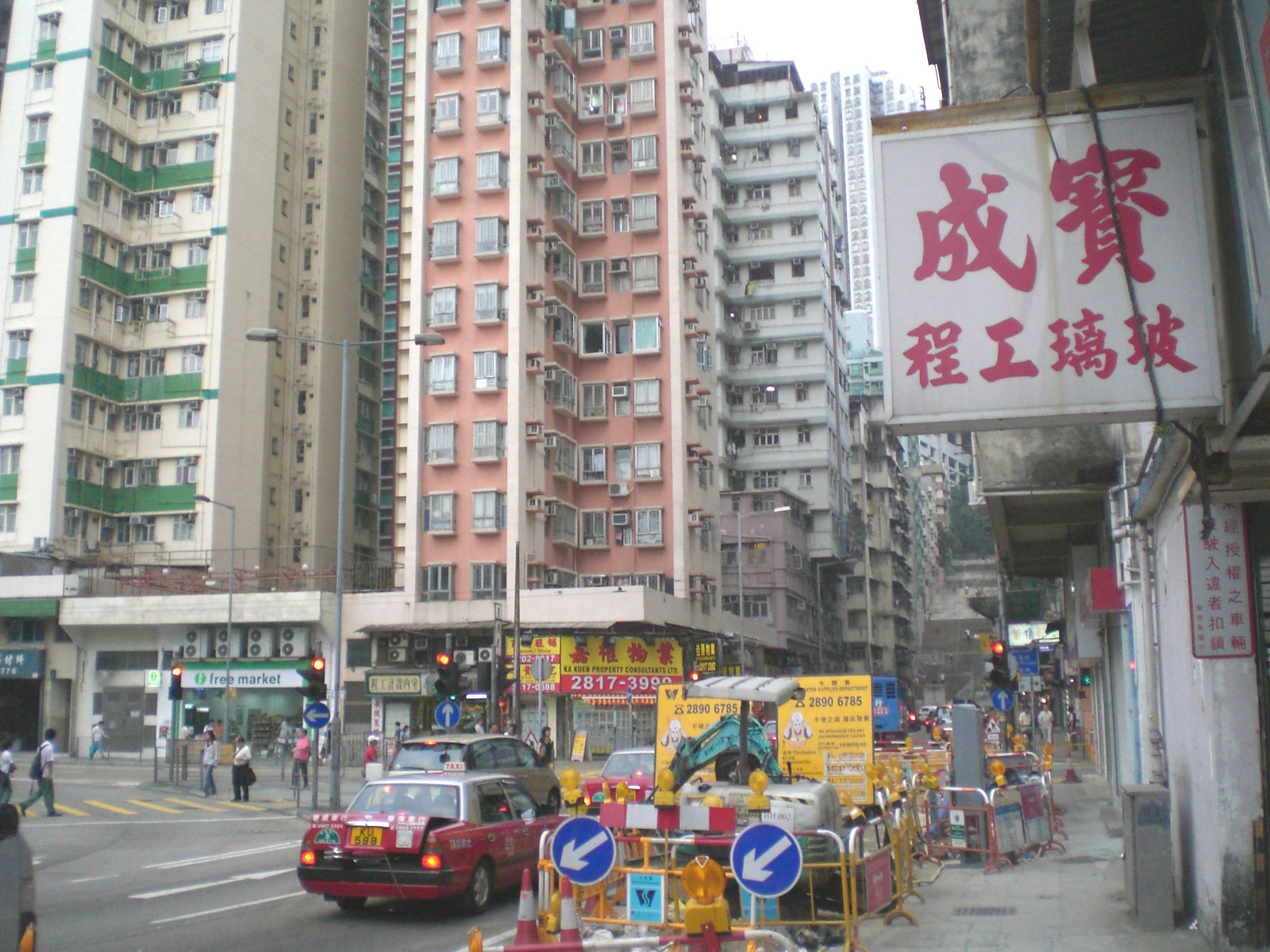
The northern section of Sands Street, looking south

Sands Street (Chinese: 山市街) is a street in Hong Kong. It is located in Kennedy Town on Hong Kong Island, connected to Kennedy Town New Praya (堅彌地城新海旁) and Shing Sai Road (城西道) in the north, passing through Kennedy Town Praya, Catchick Street and Belcher's Street. On the south side of the street, the pedestrian path on the east side continues to extend southeast, forming an uphill pedestrian street and a dead end road. There is a wide and steep staircase for people to climb up, connecting Tai Pak Terrace, Hee Wong Terrace, Ching Lin Terrace, To Li Terrace and an alley leading to Li Bo Lung Path among the Sai Wan Seven Terraces; and the driving road and pedestrian at the bottom of the slope are directly connected to Rock Hill Street (石山街), which is perpendicular to Sands Street, forming a one-way lane.

== Naming ==
Sands Street is named after Captain George Underhill Sands. In 1867, he set up a dock in Sai Wan, which is the area surrounded by the current Kennedy Town waterfront, Holland Street, Tai Pak Terrace and Sands Street. Sands Street was then Captain Sand’s Slip (山市船臺).

== West Island Line ==
In the MTR Corporation's West Island Line plan in 2005, Kennedy Town Station had two exits on Sands Street. However, in the final decision in 2006, the two exports were cancelled.

== Hillside Escalator Links and Elevator Systems (HEL) ==
There is a long staircase near the intersection of Sands Street and Rock Hill Street for residents to go up and down, but the staircase is uneven and becomes slippery after rain, causing inconvenience to residents entering and leaving the area and easily causing accidents. The Democratic Party and the Liberal Party have successively fought to build escalators and elevators on Sands Street, but there has been no progress.

In October 2007, the MTR's latest proposal for the West Island Line mentioned that the MTR Corporation would build an elevator on Rock Hill Street to connect to Sands Street and build escalators on Sands Street.

On December 28, 2012, the HEL on Sands Street were officially completed and opened. The opening of the HEL has greatly helped to improve the accessibility of such attractions, facilitate entry and exit for tourists and residents, and divert passenger flow. It is suggested to build a new HEL connecting Sands Street and Ching Lin Terrace.

== Others ==
Beyond's The Black Wall (黑色迷牆) album includes a song with the same name, Sands Street, which is the soundtrack of the movie The Black Wall.

In addition, this area is high above the sea level, and the nearby tenement buildings still retain their ancient style and are not affected by the traffic noise of Belcher's Street. Therefore, many movies and TV series have been filmed in Sands Street or nearby places, such as ATV's TV series Chameleon (變色龍).
