= Sai Wan Seven Terraces =

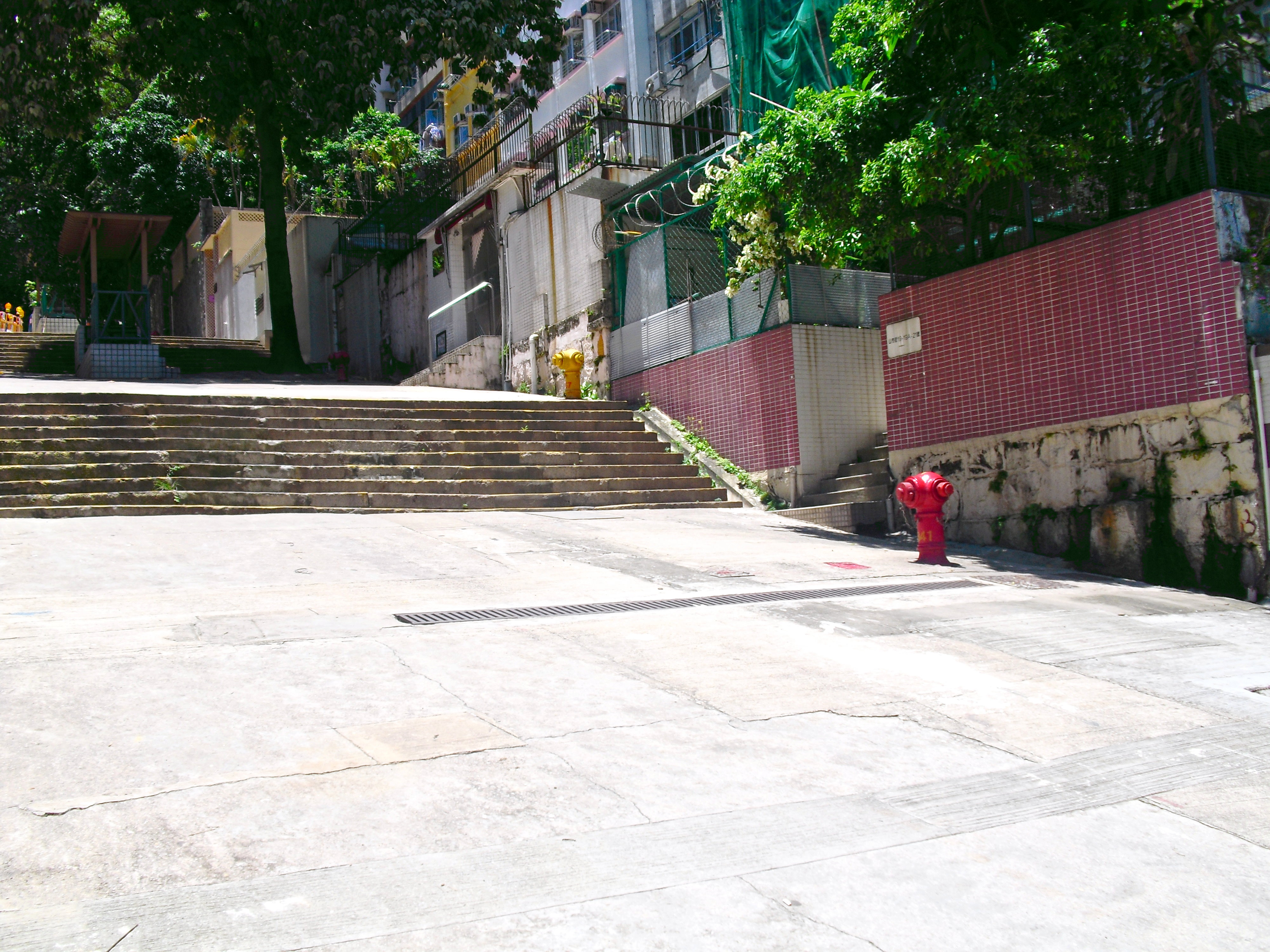
Sai Wan Seven Terraces

Sai Wan Seven Terraces (Chinese: 西環七臺), also known as the Seven Terraces of Sai Wan, is a historic residential area and street cluster in Kennedy Town, Hong Kong. It borders Li Po Lung Path (李寶龍路) to the east and Sands Street (山市街) to the west. Before the major reclamation projects in Sai Wan, houses were built along hillsides. The flat land reclaimed on the hillsides for building houses was called Terrace or "Toi" (臺). The history of Sai Wan Seven Terraces can be traced back to 1920s. The Seven Terraces are namely Tai Pak Terrace (太白臺), Hee Wong Terrace (羲皇臺), Ching Lin Terrace (青蓮臺), To Li Terrace (桃李臺), Academic Terrace (學士臺), Li Po Lung Terrace (李寶龍臺) and Tse Lan Terrace (紫蘭臺). The last three terraces, Academic Terrace, To Li Terrace and Ching Lin Terrace, are built on a higher elevation. In the early days when there were no high-rise buildings nearby to block the full sea view of these three terraces, the property prices of the apartments there were comparative higher than those of the lower four terraces. Therefore, they tended to be owned by people of greater wealth, mainly well-off Chinese businessmen.

As Academic Terrace takes up the highest point and the apartments are larger, the home owners there are more well-off as they have to pay more to buy one.

Due to urban renewal, Li Po Lung Terrace and Tse Lan Terrace were demolished and no longer exist.

In the past, each of these Seven Terraces had its own guard corps (更練), funded by the residents of the Terraces for about two to three Hong Kong dollars per apartment by way of a security and management fee. The guards patrolled the Terraces and armed themselves with wooden sticks and whistle. Hawkers and street performers were allowed to enter the area of the Terraces and sell their wares to the residents for a living.

== History ==
The land of Sai Wan Seven Terraces was previously known as Sai Wan Hill (西環山). The original owner of the land was Li Sing (李陞), a wealthy businessman in the early colonial days of Hong Kong and one of the richest Chinese in Hong Kong in the late 19th century. He handed the land over to his son Li Po Lung (Li Po Chun's elder brother) who went on to develop the land lot into a residential area. Li Sing died in the 1900s and the family's fortune began to decline. In 1924, Li Po Lung was forced to sell Sai Wan Hill to pay off his debts. The transaction nearly caused the Lo Pan Temple (魯班先師廟) in Ching Lin Terrace to be demolished. The buyers, the owners of Hop Hing Company (合興公司), Li Sin Ku (李星衢) and Woon Tong (譚煥堂), agreed not to demolish the temple and transfer the Temple to Kwong Yuet Tong (廣悅堂) for management. Nowadays, though many buildings in Sai Wan Seven Terraces have been demolished and rebuilt, the remaining tenement buildings still keep their original style and are used as filming locations for many movies and TV series.

== Origin ==
The naming of Seven Terraces is related to the famous Tang Dynasty poet Li Pak (aka Li Bai). It is so because the developer of the Terraces, Li Po Lung, was a fan of Li Pak's poems. To remember the developer, the street on the other side of the Terraces is named Li Po Lung Road, and one of the Terraces was named Li Po Lung Terrace.

The "Tai Pak" in Tai Pak Terrace is Li Pak's courtesy name; Ching Lin Terrace is taken from Li Pak's pseudonym Ching Lin Geoi Si (青蓮居士); To Li Terrace comes from Li Pak's ancient Chinese work "Preface to a Banquet in To Li Garden on a Spring Night" (《春夜宴桃李園序》); Hee Wong Terrace comes from when Li Pak called himself Hee Wong Person (羲皇人) in his poem "A Playful Gift to Zheng Liyang" (《戲贈鄭溧陽》); Academic Terrace refers to the fact that Emperor Xuanzong of the Tang Dynasty (唐玄宗) appointed Li Pak as a Hanlin scholar (翰林學士); and the "Tse Lan" in Tse Lan Terrace was mentioned in Li Pak's poem "Reply to Du Xiucai's Gift from Five Pines" (《答杜秀才五松見贈》): "Floating clouds obscure the sun and never return; It's always the autumn wind that lays waste to the purple orchids." (浮雲蔽日去不返，總為秋風摧紫蘭).
