= Davis Street, Hong Kong =

Street in Kennedy Town, Hong Kong

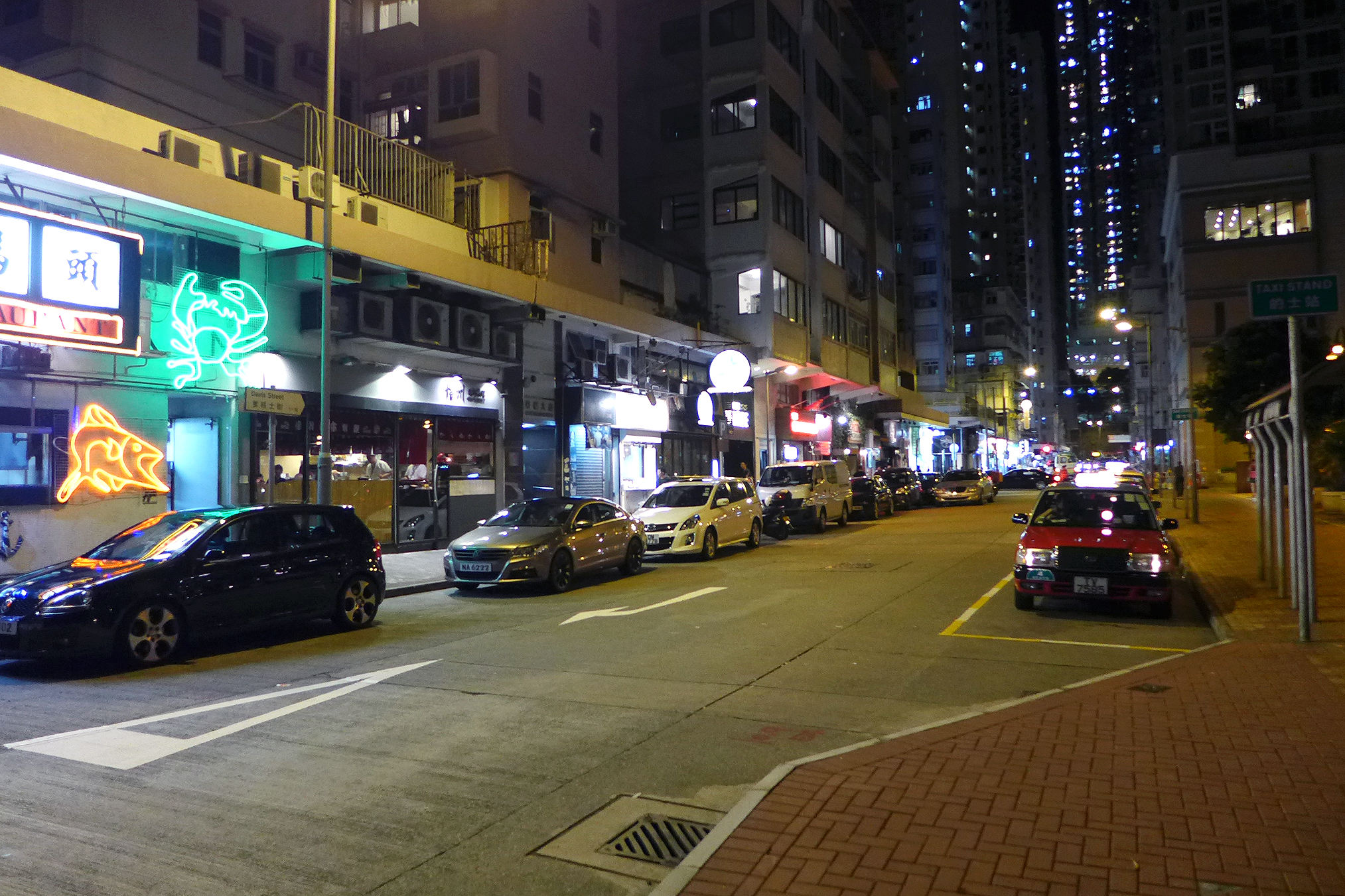
Davis Street

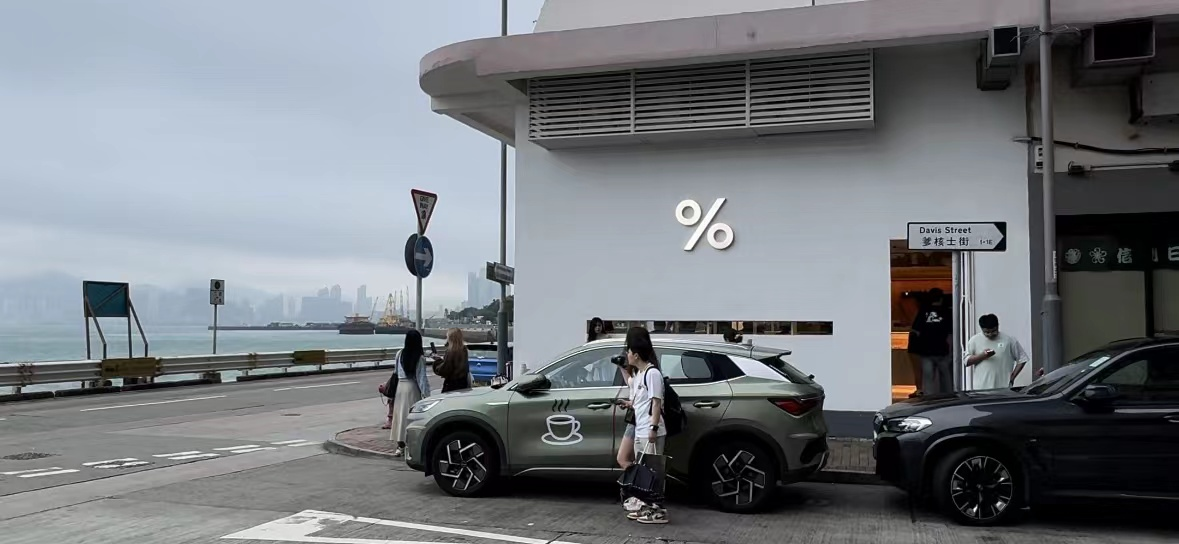
Junction of Davis Street and New Praya, Kennedy Town

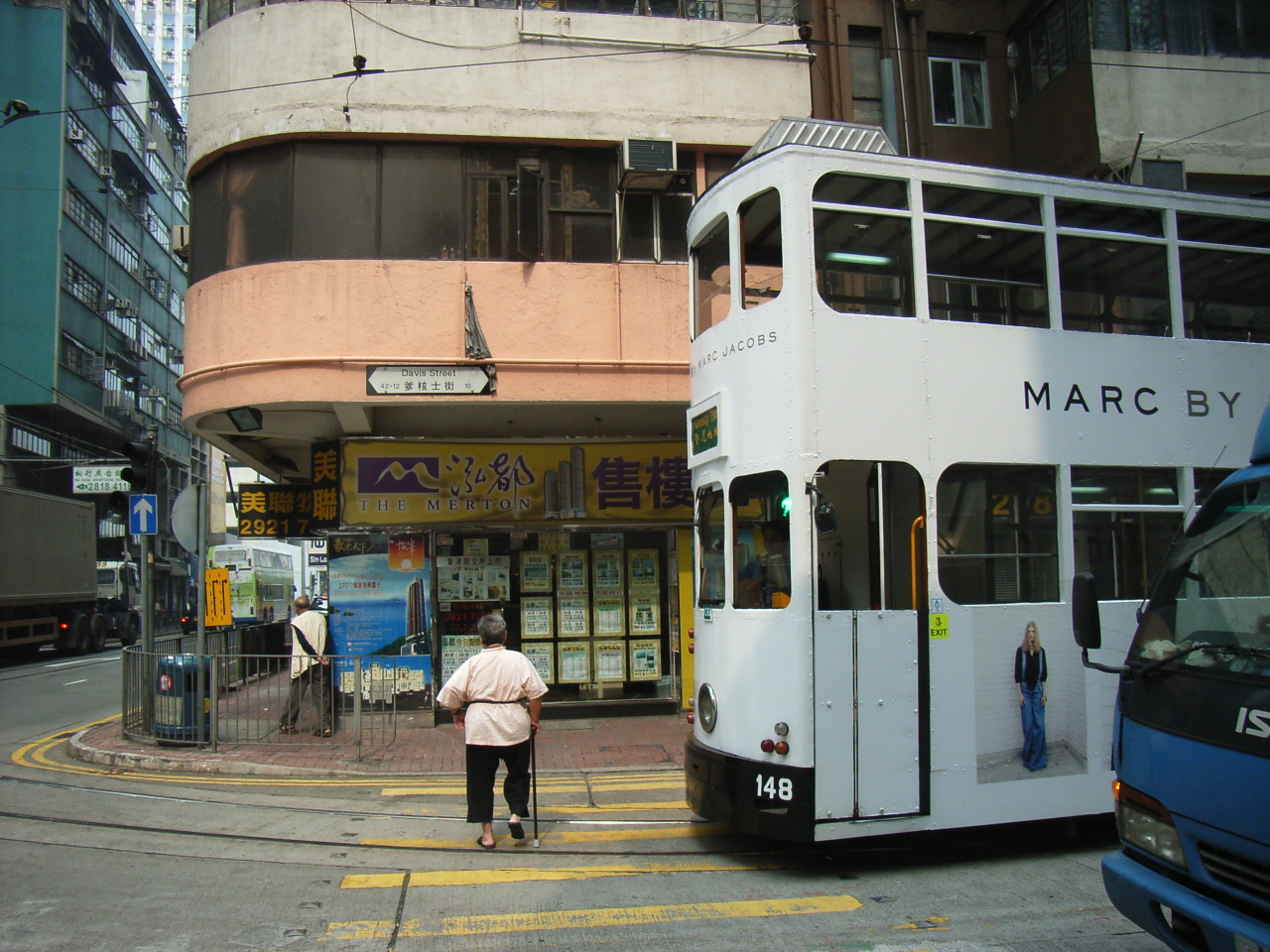
Tram in Davis Street

Davis Street (Chinese: 爹核士街; Jyutping: de1 hat6 si6 gaai1) is a street in the Kennedy Town area of Hong Kong Island, Hong Kong. The total length of the street is 230 meters. It runs south-north, between Smithfield to the east and Cadogan Street to the west. The southern end of the road starts from Forbes Street, connects to Belcher Street in the middle, and then to the waterfront at the New Praya, Kennedy Town in the north.

Davis Street was named after Sir John Francis Davis, 1st Baronet, the second Governor of Hong Kong. His name has two Chinese translations: “戴維斯” and “爹核士”.

== Features ==
There is a private residential development nearby called The Merton, which was jointly developed by New World Development and the Urban Renewal Authority. The estate has a total of 3 towers, providing 1,182 units. Among them, more than 20 property units had their deposits confiscated by developers because they had not yet delivered the last payment by June 2006.

In the middle section of road, between the New Praya, Kennedy Town and Catchick Street, used to have a public toilet in the centre of the road (only men's toilets, no women's toilets), but it was demolished in the 2000s.

Heung Heung Bread (香香麵包), founded in 1966, once set up its factory opposite the public toilet, so there was a popular local joke that "we smell good, the one across the street stinks" (我們就香香、對面就臭臭).

After the MTR West Island Line was fully opened to traffic in 2015, many specialty restaurants and bars were opened here, and more and more, attracting many foreign travellers and local visitors.

The junction of Davis Street and the New Praya, Kennedy Town is one of the popular tourist check-in spots and Instagram hotspot.

== Transport ==
The tramway on Davis Street has the sharp 90-degree turn. Noise is a daily annoyance, particularly in the morning and midnight, when trams run on the track.
