= Kennedy Town Swimming Pool =

Swimming pool in Kennedy Town, Hong Kong

Coordinates: 22.2860°N 114.1313°E

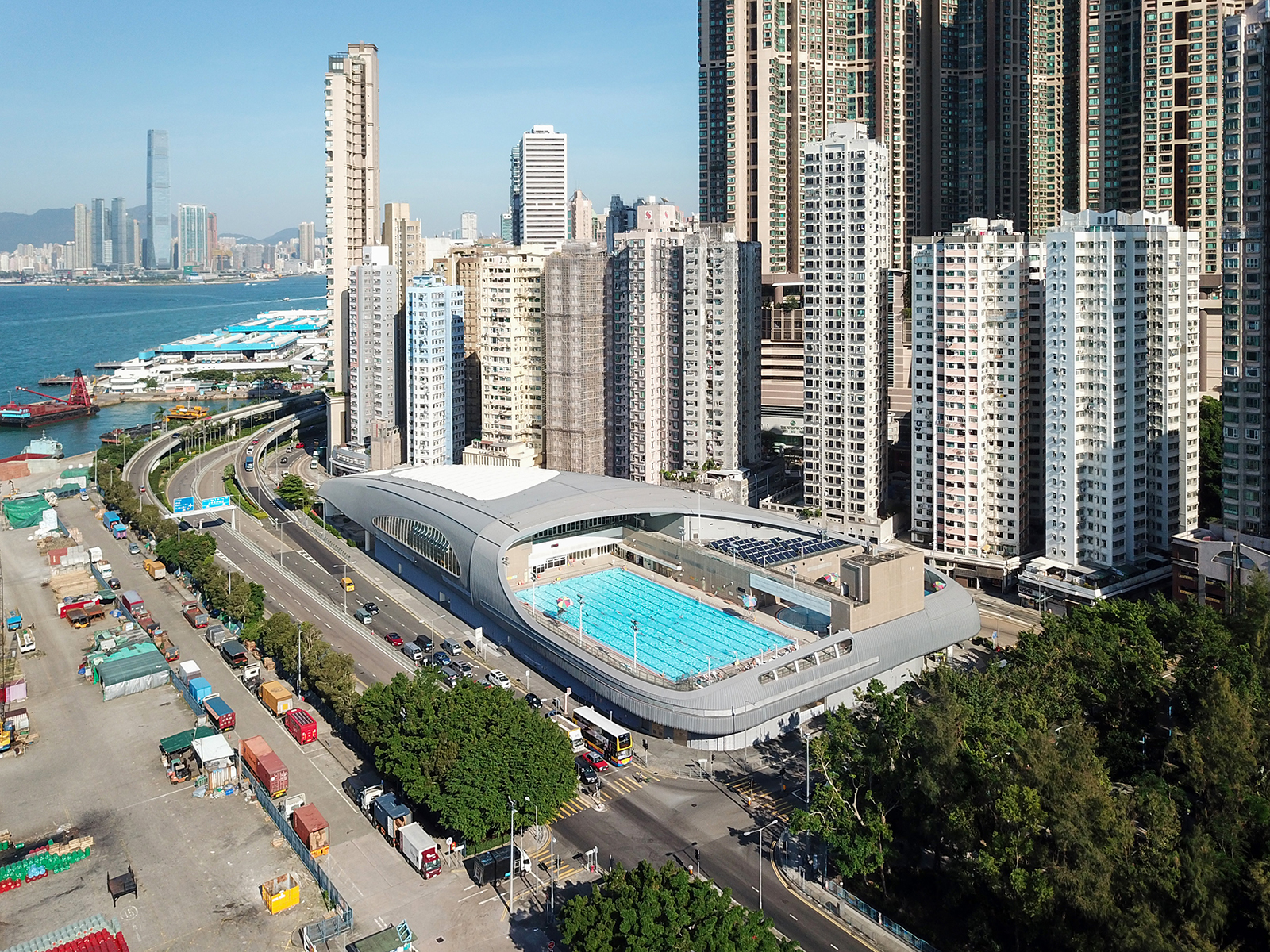
- Pool complex
- Interactive map of Kennedy Town Swimming Pool
- Location: 2 Sai Cheung Street North, Kennedy Town, Central and Western District, Hong Kong
- Operator: Leisure and Cultural Services Department

Construction
- Opened: 14 August 1974; 51 years ago, rebuilt 2011–2017
- Construction cost: HK$671 million (second generation)
- Architect: Farrells

Website
- Official website

The Kennedy Town Swimming Pool (Chinese: 堅尼地城游泳池) is a public swimming complex in Kennedy Town, Hong Kong. There have been two pools of this name. The first iteration opened in 1974 while the current iteration opened in 2011.

== First generation ==
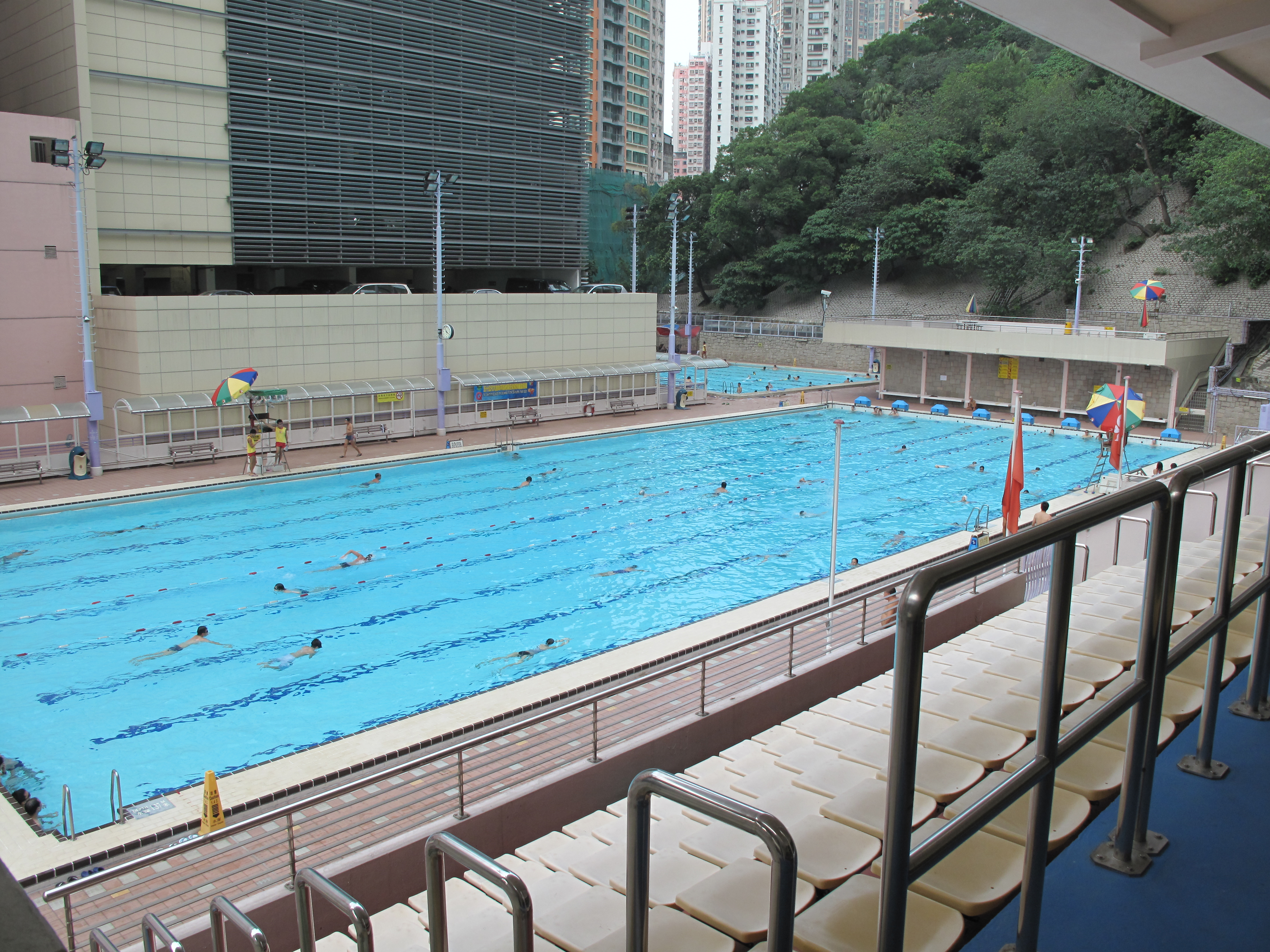
The first generation pool in 2010

Construction of the Kennedy Town Swimming Pool began in 1971 on the former site of the Kennedy Town cattle quarantine depot on Smithfield. The $7.5 million facility was funded by the Royal Hong Kong Jockey Club and opened on 14 August 1974. At the opening ceremony, Jockey Club steward Douglas Laing unveiled a commemorative plaque. The pool was built and managed by the Urban Council and was the first public pool in Western District. The complex comprised two 50 metre pools, a diving pool, a spectator stand as well as smaller children's pools.

The West Island line, a scheme to extend the Island line railway line to Western District, was gazetted in October 2007 and given final authorisation in March 2009. It was decided to build the terminus of the line, Kennedy Town station, at Smithfield, necessitating the demolition of the swimming pool.

== Second generation ==
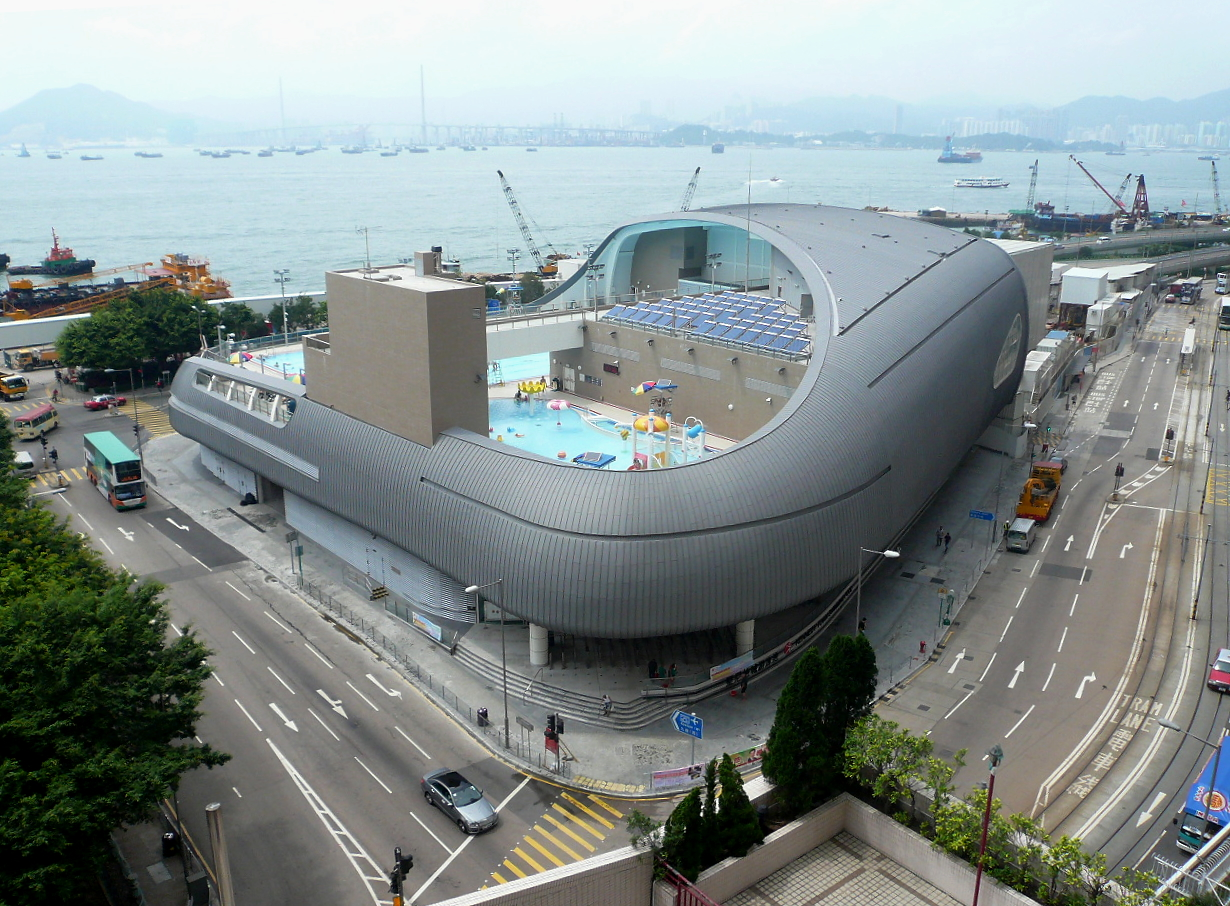
A 2011 photo of the first phase of the second generation pool, taken prior to the construction of the second phase

The new swimming pool complex occupies a 0.8 ha site near the Kennedy Town waterfront. It was designed by architecture firm Farrells, built by Paul Y. Engineering, and cost an estimated HK$671 million. The complex includes two 50 metres pools, a 25-metre training pool, a children's pool and a jacuzzi. The futuristic pool building is clad in zinc, while a translucent insulated membrane roofing system allows diffuse natural light to reach the indoor pool hall.

Comprising the outdoor pools only, the first phase of the new complex opened on 11 May 2011.

The second phase of the swimming pool, comprising the indoor pools, was completed in 2016 and opened to the public on 7 February 2017.

== See also ==
- Praya, Kennedy Town
