= Belcher Bay =

Bay in Hong Kong, People's Republic of China

Coordinates: 22°17′N 114°07′E

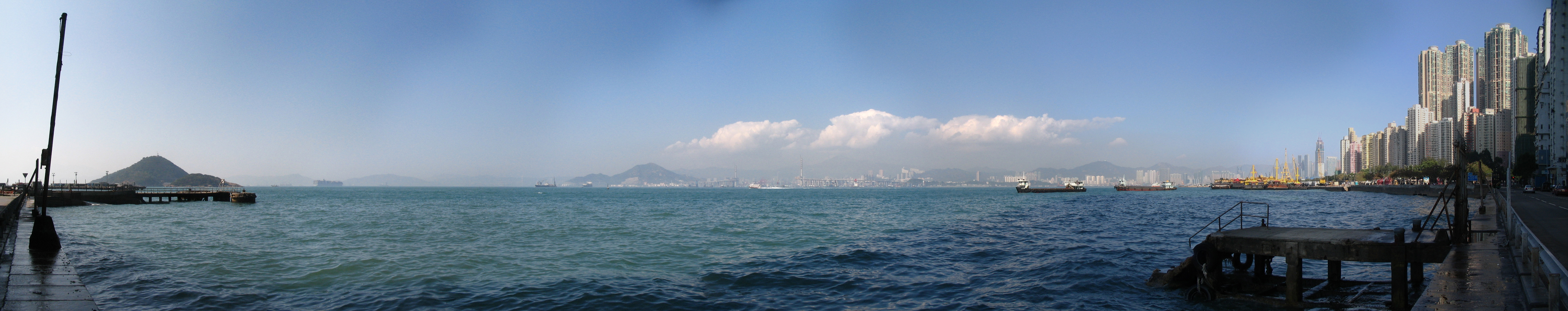
- Traditional Chinese: 卑路乍灣
Transcriptions
Yue: Cantonese
- Yale Romanization: Bēi louh jaa wāan
- Jyutping: Bei1 lou6 zaa3 waan1

Belcher Bay is a bay at Kennedy Town on the northwest shore of Hong Kong Island in Hong Kong. It is located east of Sulphur Channel. The bay is named after Edward Belcher, a Nova Scotia-born British naval officer who surveyed the surrounding water and land in the Victoria Harbour in 1841. Green Island and Little Green Island are located within the bay.

It is currently used as a site for larger ships to load and unload goods between barges instead of mooring along docks.

In 2019, Belcher Bay Promenade opened in phases. However, due to a plan to build a road connecting western Hong Kong Island to the northeastern part of Lantau Island, land reclamation in front of the promenade would be necessary and would require the closure of the area for five years.

== See also ==
- Belcher's Street
