= Hatton =

Hatton may refer to:

== Places ==
=== England ===
- Hatton, Cheshire West and Chester, a former civil parish
- Hatton, Derbyshire, a village and civil parish
- Hatton, Lincolnshire, a village and civil parish
- Hatton, London, in the London Borough of Hounslow
- Hatton, Shropshire, a hamlet in the civil parish of Eaton-under-Heywood
- Hatton, Warrington, Cheshire, a civil parish and hamlet
- Hatton, Warwickshire, a village and civil parish

=== Scotland ===
- Hatton, Aberdeenshire, a village
- Hatton Castle, Aberdeenshire
- Hatton Castle, Angus
- Hatton Hill, a mountain landform in Angus

=== United States ===
- Hatton, Colbert County, Alabama, an unincorporated community
- Hatton, Lawrence County, Alabama, a census-designated place and unincorporated community
- Hatton, Arkansas, an unincorporated community
- Hatton, Kentucky, an unincorporated community
- Hatton Township, Michigan
  - Hatton, Michigan, an unincorporated community
- Hatton, Missouri, an unincorporated community
- Hatton, North Dakota, a city
- Hatton, Ohio, an unincorporated community
- Hatton, Utah, an unincorporated community
- Hatton, Virginia, an unincorporated community
- Hatton, Washington, a town
- Hatton, Wisconsin, a ghost town
- Hatton, Wyoming, an unincorporated community

=== Elsewhere ===
- Hatton, Saskatchewan, Canada, an unincorporated community
- Hatton, Sri Lanka, a town
- Hatton, Antigua and Barbuda, a village

== People ==
- Hatton (surname)
- Hatton Compton (died 1741), English army officer, Lieutenant of the Tower of London and Lord Lieutenant of the Tower Hamlets
- Hatton W. Sumners (1875–1962), American politician

== Other uses ==
- Hatton baronets, an extinct title in the Baronetage of England
- Hatton National Bank, a private bank in Sri Lanka
- Hatton railway station (disambiguation)
- Hatton Road, Hong Kong

== See also ==
- Hatton-Brown Publishers
- Hatton Basin, off the coast of Ireland
- Hatton Canyon, in California
- Hattin (disambiguation)
