= List of hiking trails in Hong Kong =

Many named hiking trails have been established in Hong Kong:

== Hong Kong Island ==
- Hong Kong Trail
- Wilson Trail (stages 1 and 2)
- Tai Tam Country Trail
- Pottinger Peak Country Trail
- Hong Pak Country Trail
- Aberdeen Tree Walk
- Tai Tam Tree Walk
- Pok Fu Lam Tree Walk
- Quarry Bay Tree Walk
- Wong Nai Chung Tree Walk
- Lung Fu Shan Fitness Trail
- Aberdeen Fitness Trail
- Quarry Bay Jogging Trail
- Aberdeen Orienteering Trail
- Quarry Bay Orienteering Trail
- Pok Fu Lam Orienteering Trail
- Pok Fu Lam Family Walk
- Tai Tam Family Walk
- Aberdeen Nature Trail
- Central and Western Heritage Trail
- Tai Tam Waterworks Heritage Trail
- Wan Chai Heritage Trail
- St. Stephen's College Heritage Trail
- Morning Trail
- Pik Shan Path

== Lantau Island ==
- Lantau Trail
- South Lantau Country Trail
- Wong Lung Hang Country Trail
- Keung Shan Country Trail
- Chi Ma Wan Country Trail
- Shek Pik Country Trail
- Fan Lau Country Trail
- Tei Tong Tsai Country Trail
- Lo Fu Tau Country Trail
- Nei Nak Shan Country Trail
- Luk Wu Country Trail
- Ngong Ping Tree Walk
- Nam Shan Tree Walk

== Other Islands ==
- Argyle Ross Trail (stages 1 and 2)
- Ping Chau Country Trail

== Kowloon & New Territories ==
- Argyle Ross Trail
- MacLehose Trail
- Wilson Trail (stages 3 through 10)
- Hok Tau Country Trail
- Lau Shui Heung Country Trail
- Wu Kau Tang Country Trail
- Nam Chung Country Trail
- Plover Cove Reservoir Country Trail
- High Junk Peak Country Trail
- Lung Ha Wan Country Trail (C32XX distance posts)
- Ma On Shan Country Trail
- Lung Mun Country Trail
- Yuen Tsuen Ancient Trail
- Yuen Tun Country Trail
- Tai Lam Chung Country Trail
- Kap Lung Ancient Trail
- Sheung Yiu Country Trail
- Pak Tam Country Trail
- Cheung Sheung Country Trail
- Tai Tan Country Trail
- Tai Tong Tree Walk
- Tai Tan Tree Walk
- Pak Tam Chung Tree Walk
- Kei Ling Ha Tree Walk
- Nai Chung Tree Walk
- Kam Shan Tree Walk
- Chung Pui Tree Walk
- Clear Water Bay Tree Walk
- Wong Shek Tree Walk
- Tuen Mun Fitness Trail
- Shing Mun Jogging Trail
- Kowloon Reception Reservoir Jogging Trail
- Shek Lei Pui Reservoir Jogging Trail
- Wan Tsai Orienteering Trail
- Ngau Liu Orienteering Trail
- Chuen Lung Family Walk
- Fung Hang Family Walk
- Ho Pui Reservoir Family Walk
- Hok Tau Reservoir Family Walk
- Kam Shan Family Walk
- Ma On Shan Family Walk
- Pak Tam Chung Family Walk
- Sheung Yiu Family Walk
- Tai Mei Tuk Family Walk
- Tai Mo Shan Family Walk
- Wong Shek Family Walk
- Bride's Pool Nature Trail
- Eagle's Nest Nature Trail
- Hung Mui Kuk Nature Trail
- Lai Chi Wo Nature Trail
- Ma Shi Chau Nature Trail
- Pak Tam Chung Nature Trail
- Pat Sin Leng Nature Trail
- Pineapple Nature Trail
- Rotary Park Nature Trail
- Tai Tong Nature Trail
- Tai Lam Nature Trail
- Tai Po Kau Nature Trail
- Tsiu Hang Nature Trail
- Twisk Nature Trail
- Wan Tsai Natural Trail
- Lung Yeuk Tau Heritage Trail
- Ping Shan Heritage Trail
- Shing Mun War Relics Trail

== See also ==
- Heritage Trails in Hong Kong
- Dragon's Back
- Tsing Yi Nature Trail
- Tung O Ancient Trail
- Country parks and special areas of Hong Kong
