= Lung Fu Shan =

Hill on Hong Kong Island, Hong Kong

Coordinates: 22°16′48″N 114°08′06″E

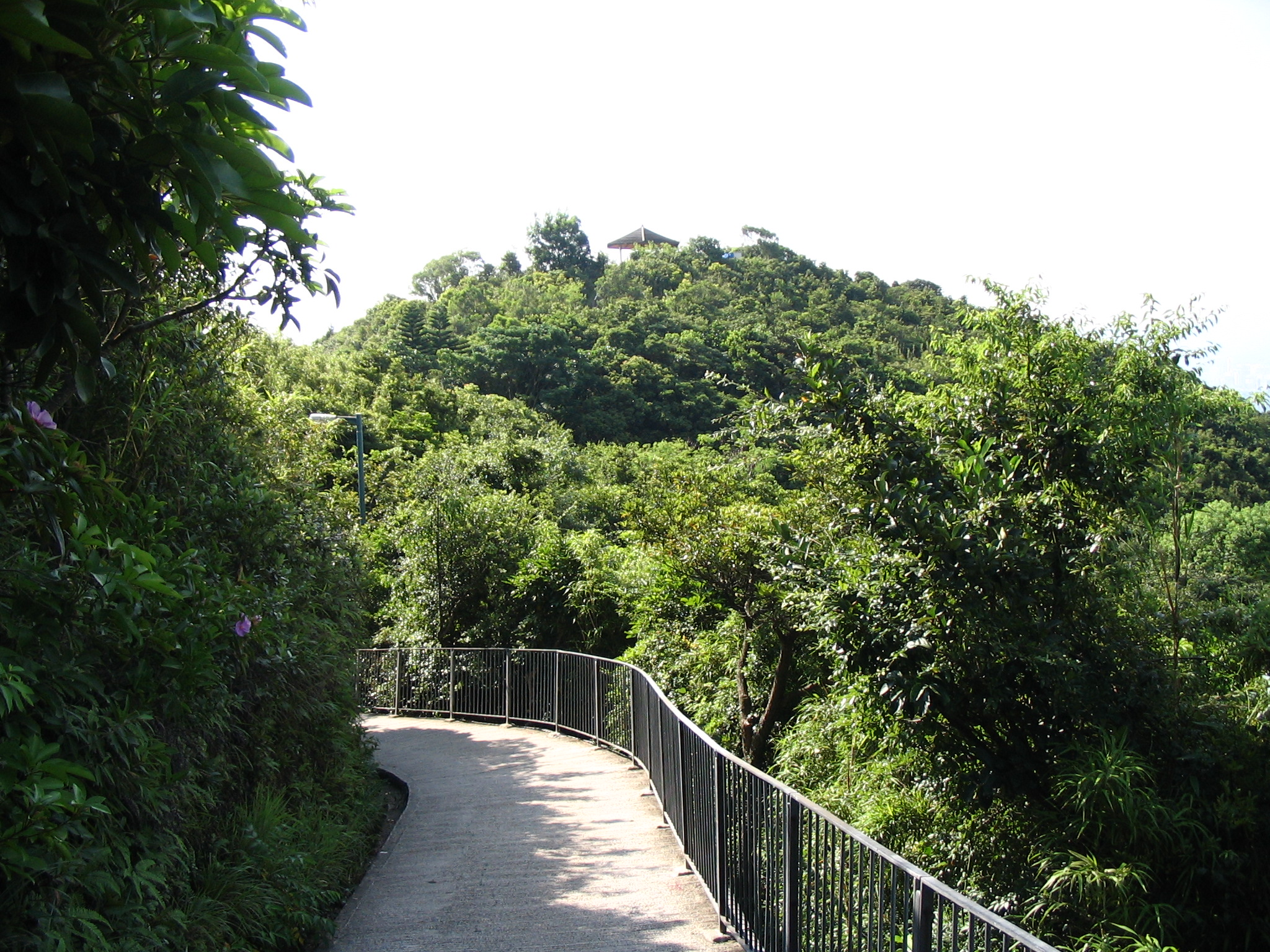
Hill Above Belcher's

Lung Fu Shan (Chinese: 龍虎山) or Hill Above Belcher's is a 831-foot (253 m) hill on the northwestern part of Hong Kong Island, Hong Kong, and an area on the northeastern slope of the hill where the main campus and centennial campus of the University of Hong Kong are located.

The southern limit of the City of Victoria passes through the northern side of the hill at the 700-foot (210 m) contour. The upper part of the hill, along with Pinewood Battery, are designated part of the Lung Fu Shan Country Park. The hill is located between the Victoria Peak ("The Peak" colloquially), Mount Davis and High West.
