= Heritage trails in Hong Kong =

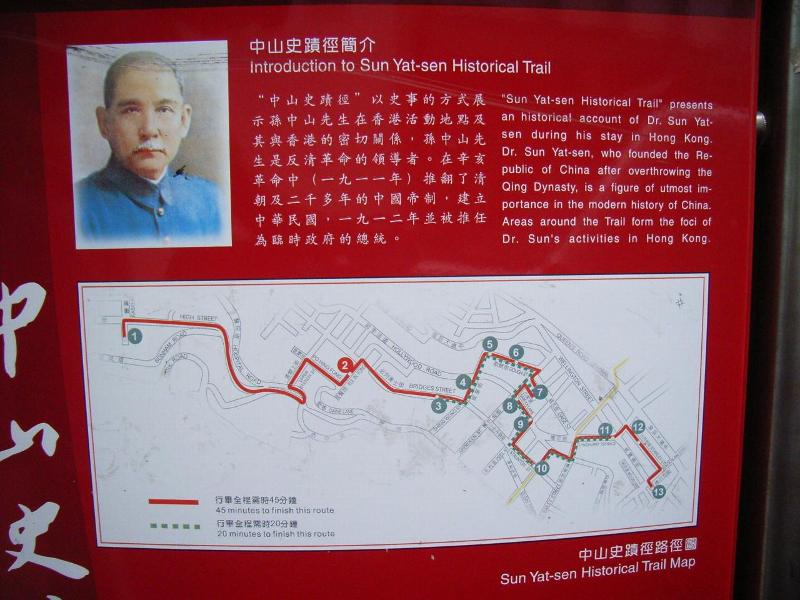
Marker along the Dr Sun Yat-sen Historical Trail

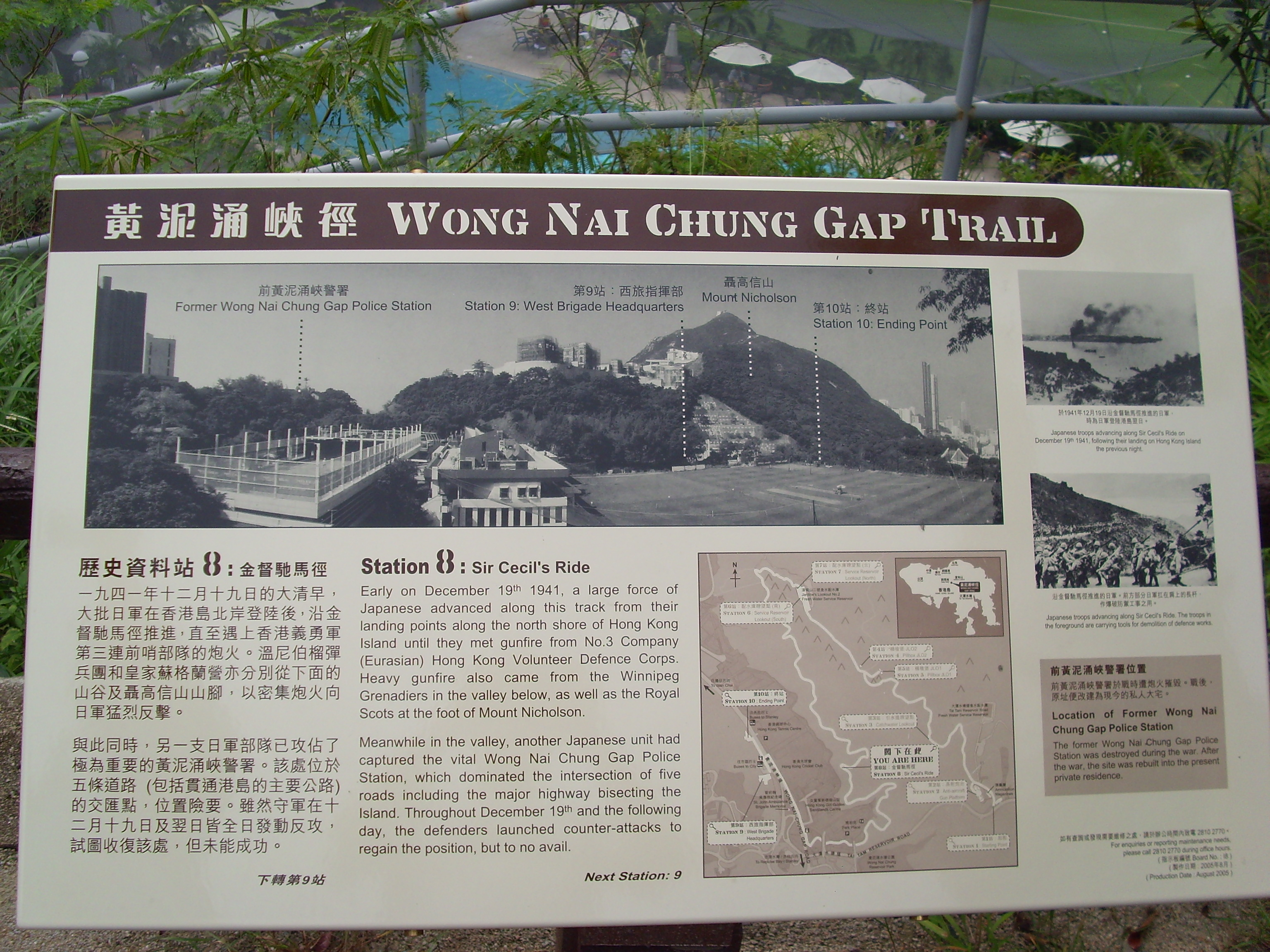
Marker along the Wong Nai Chung Gap Trail

Several heritage trails have been designed in Hong Kong:

Trails designed by the Antiquities and Monuments Office of the Leisure and Cultural Services Department:

- Ping Shan Heritage Trail, in Yuen Long District, opened on 12 December 1993
- Lung Yeuk Tau Heritage Trail
- Central and Western Heritage Trail

Other trails include

- Dr Sun Yat-sen Historical Trail, in Central and Western District.
- Hong Kong Boulder Trackways
- St Stephen's College Heritage Trail
- Tai Tam Waterworks Heritage Trail
- Wan Chai Heritage Trail, launched on 27 September 2009

Military history trails

- Pinewood Battery Heritage Trail, within the Lung Fu Shan Country Park
- Shing Mun War Relics Trail
- Wong Nai Chung Gap Trail, opened in 2006
- Mount Davis Heritage Trail, covering the western military sector of HK

== See also ==
- List of hiking trails in Hong Kong
- List of buildings and structures in Hong Kong
- Heritage conservation in Hong Kong
- Declared monuments of Hong Kong
- List of Grade I historic buildings in Hong Kong
- List of Grade II historic buildings in Hong Kong
- List of Grade III historic buildings in Hong Kong
- History of Hong Kong
