= Victoria, Hong Kong =

De facto capital of colonial Hong Kong

Coordinates: 22°16′42″N 114°10′28″E

City of Victoria 維多利亞市 Victoria
- City
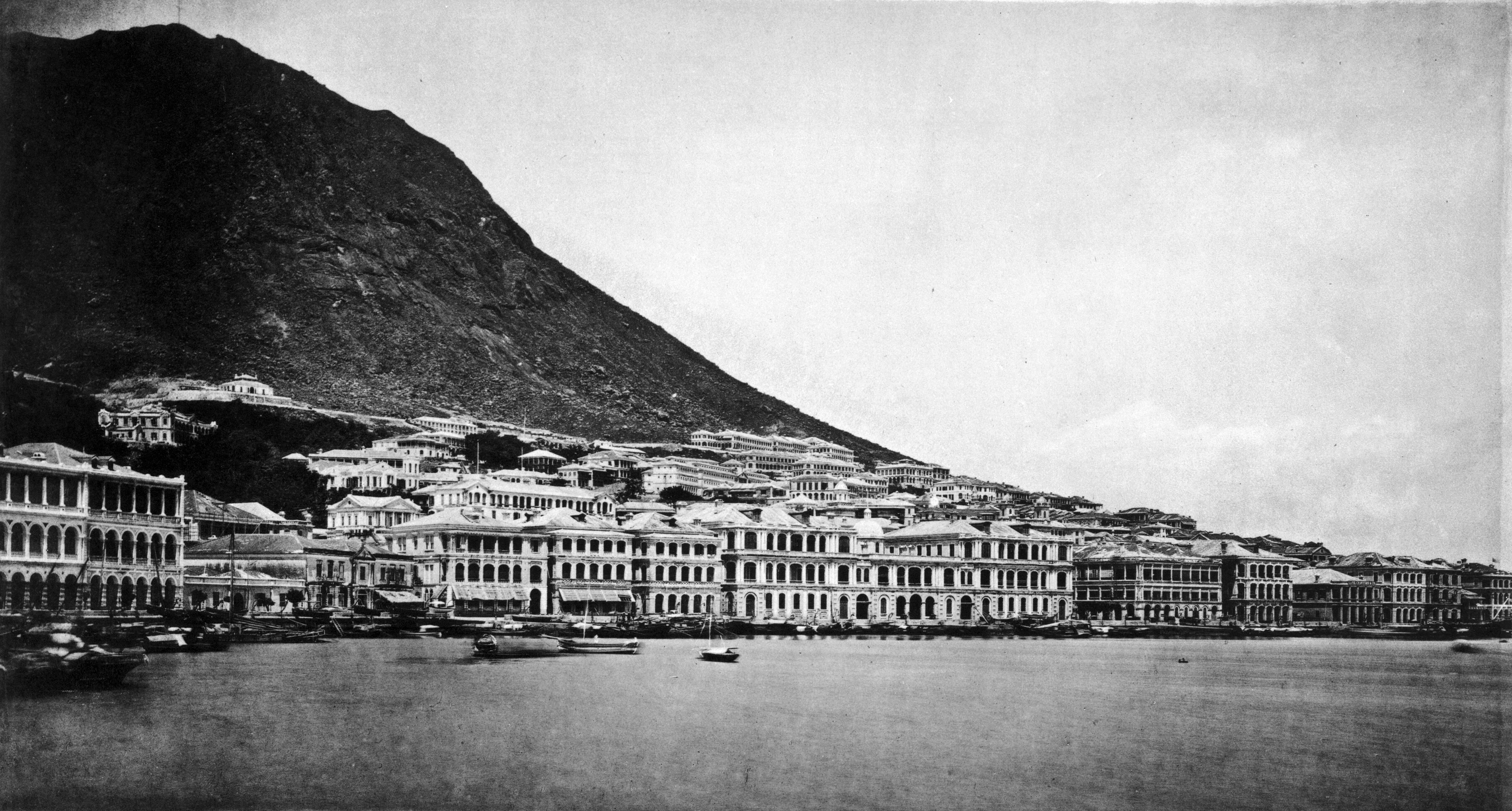
- Praya Central of the City of Victoria, 1870s

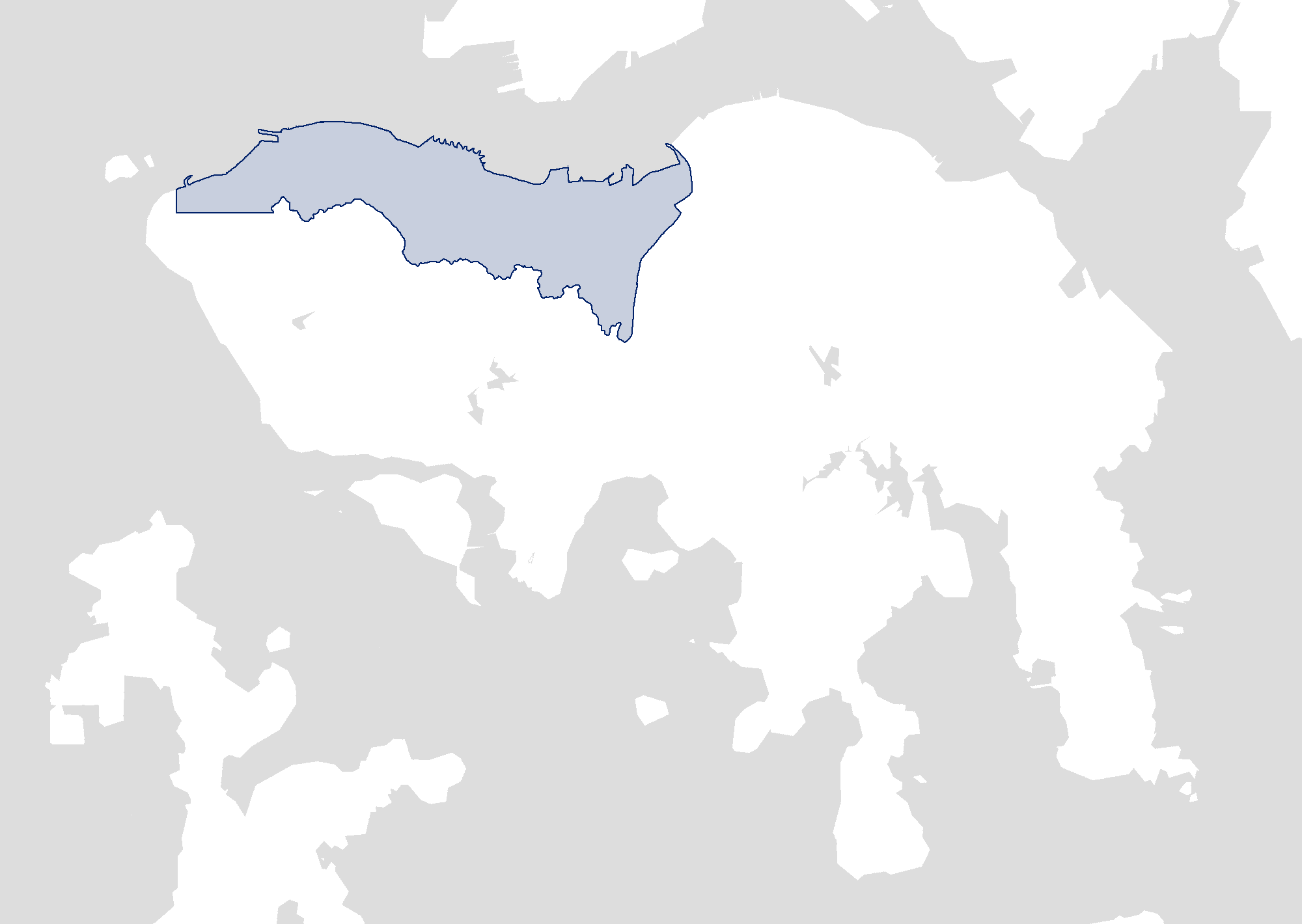
- Boundaries of the Victoria City according to the Interpretation and General Clauses Ordinance

- Location within Hong Kong
- Country: United Kingdom
- Dependent territory: (British Hong Kong) Hong Kong
- Founded as a town: 25 January 1841
- Incorporated as a city: 11 May 1849
- Founder: Charles Elliot
- Elevation: 552 m (1,811 ft)
- Time zone: UTC+08:00 (HKT)

City of Victoria
- Traditional Chinese: 維多利亞市 維多利亞城
- Simplified Chinese: 维多利亚市 维多利亚城
- Cantonese Yale: Wàih dō leih a shíh Wàih dō leih a shìhng
Transcriptions
Standard Mandarin
- Hanyu Pinyin: Wéiduōlìyà Shì; Wéiduōlìyà Chéng
Yue: Cantonese
- Yale Romanization: Wàih dō leih a shíh Wàih dō leih a shìhng
- Jyutping: Wai4 do1 lei6 aa3 si5 Wai4 do1 lei6 aa3 sing4
- IPA: [wɐ̏itɔ́ːlèiʔā si̬ː] [wɐ̏itɔ́ːlèiʔā si̭ːŋ]

The City of Victoria, (Chinese: 維多利亞市, or 維多利亞城) often called Victoria City or simply Victoria (Chinese: 維城), is an area in Hong Kong de jure and was the de facto capital of Hong Kong during its time as a British dependent territory. It was initially named Queenstown but was soon known as Victoria. It was one of the first urban settlements in Hong Kong and its boundaries are recorded in the laws of Hong Kong. All government bureaux and many key departments still have their head offices located within its limit.

Present-day Central is at the heart of Victoria City. Although the city expanded over much of what is now Kennedy Town, Shek Tong Tsui, Lung Fu Shan, Sai Ying Pun, Sheung Wan, Wan Chai, Happy Valley, the Mid-Levels, East Point and parts of Causeway Bay, the name Victoria has been eclipsed by Central in popular usage. However, the name is still used in places such as Victoria Park, Victoria Peak, Victoria Harbour, Victoria Prison, and a number of roads and streets. It is also retained in the names of various organisations such as the Victoria City District of the Hong Kong Scout, and the Victoria Junior Chamber. The name Victoria District Court had been used into the 1980s, when it was moved to the Wanchai Tower and later on combined with other district courts in the territory.

== History ==
"City of Victoria" had appeared on the statute books early in the 1845, although names such as "Town of Victoria" can be found as well. Letters patent that formally confers the city status and creates the City of Victoria was made on 11 May 1849.

In 1857, the British government expanded the scope of Victoria City and divided it into four wans (Chinese: 環; Jyutping: waan4; lit. 'rings'):

- Sai Wan (lit. 'West Ring', present-day Sai Wan, including Kennedy Town, Shek Tong Tsui, and Sai Ying Pun)
- Sheung Wan ('Upper Ring', present-day Sheung Wan)
- Choong Wan or Chung Wan ('Central Ring', present-day Central)
- Ha Wan (Lower Ring, present-day Wan Chai).

"Sai Wan", "Sheung Wan" and "Choong Wan" retain the same Chinese name today. The four wans are further divided into nine yeuks (約, similar to 'district' or 'neighbourhood'). The coverage also included parts of East Point and Happy Valley (west of Wong Nai Chung Road on the east side of the racecourse). In 1903, boundary stones were established to mark the city's boundary and six of them are still preserved today. The stones spread from Causeway Bay to Kennedy Town.

In the 1890s, Victoria extended 6.4 kilometres (4 mi) west to east along the coastal strip. Buildings were made of granite and brick. Buses and the new tramway would become the main form of transport in the area.

The city is centred in present-day Central, and named after Queen Victoria in 1843. It occupies the areas known in modern times as Central, Admiralty, Sheung Wan, Wan Chai, East Point, Shek Tong Tsui, the Mid-levels, the Peak, Happy Valley, Tin Hau, and Kennedy Town, on Hong Kong Island.

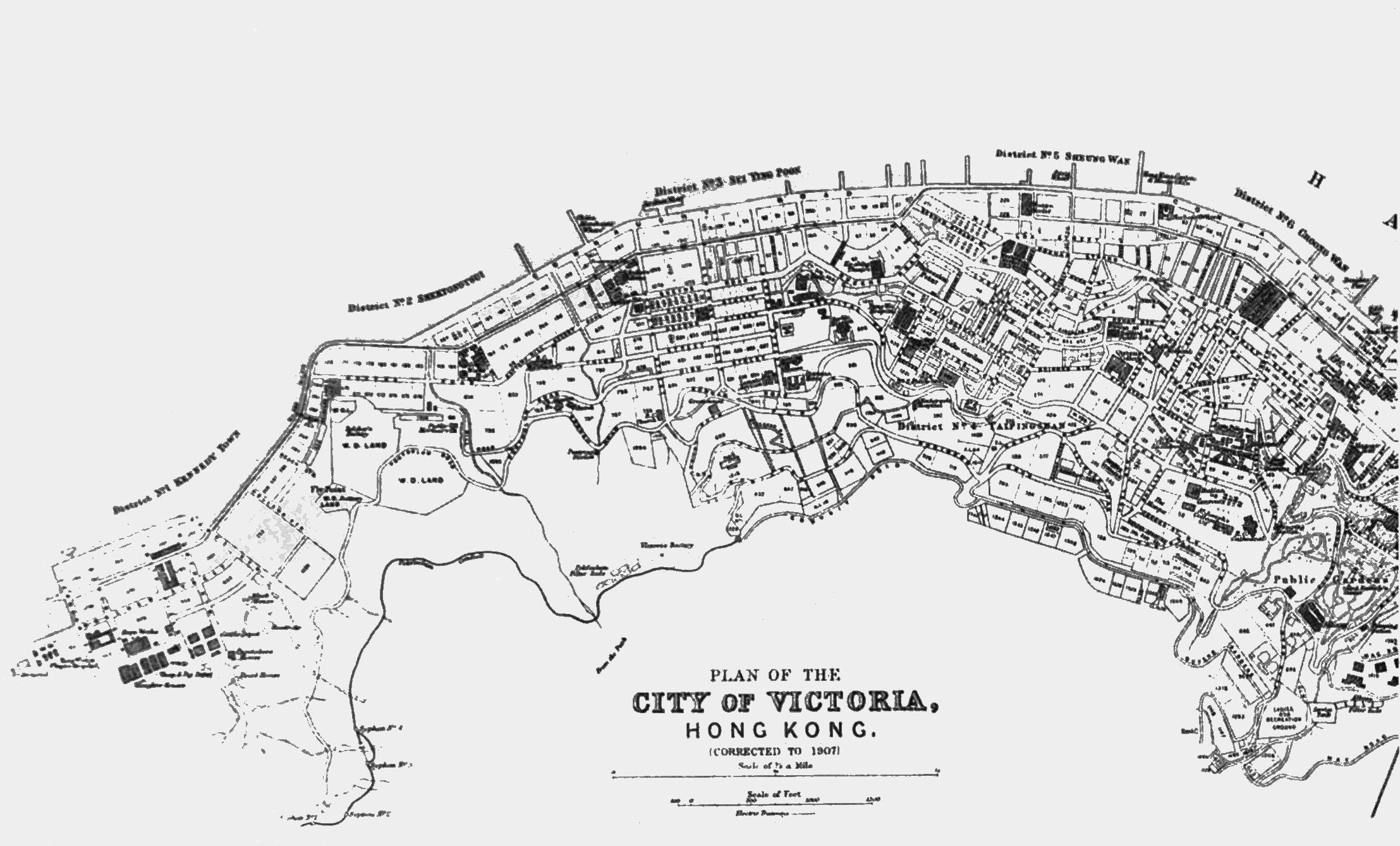
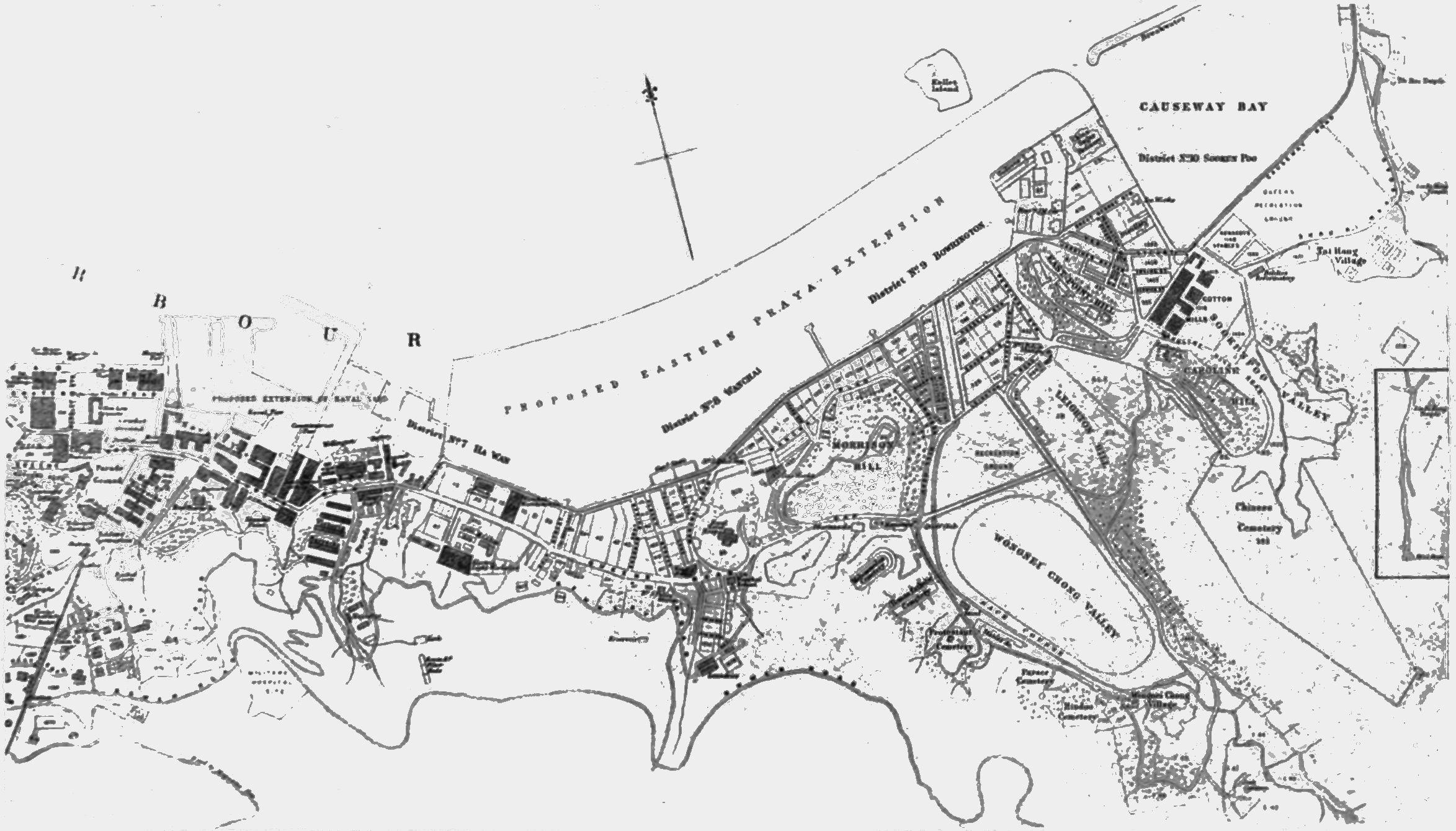
Map of Victoria published in 1908

== Boundaries ==
Map of Victoria City with location of boundary rocks marked in red

The city boundaries are defined in the laws of Hong Kong as follows:

- On the north – The Harbour;
- On the west – A line running due north and south drawn through the north-west angle of Inland Lot No. 1299 and extending southwards a distance of 850 feet (260 m) from the aforesaid angle;
- On the south – A line running due east from the southern extremity of the western boundary until it meets a contour in the vicinity of the Hill above Belchers 700 feet (210 m) above principal datum, that is to say, a level 17.833 feet (5.435 m) below the bench-mark known as "Rifleman's Bolt", the highest point of a copper bolt set horizontally in the east wall of the Royal Navy Office and Mess Block Naval Dockyard, and thence following the said contour until it meets the eastern boundary;
- On the east – A line following the west side of the Government Pier, Bay View and thence along the west side of Hing Fat Street, then along the north side of Causeway Road to Moreton Terrace. Thence along the west side of Moreton Terrace to the south-east corner of Inland Lot No. 1580 and produced in a straight line for 80 feet (24 m), and thence along the north side of Cotton Path and produced until it meets the west side of Wong Nei Chong Road on the east side of Wong Nei Chong Valley and thence to the south-east angle of Inland Lot No. 1364, produced until it meets the southern boundary.

== First streets ==
According to the 1845 map of Victoria City, 16 streets were initially named for the city. These streets exist mainly in the areas of Central and the Mid-Levels, with two being in Sheung Wan. These street names were finalised by the second governor of Hong Kong, Sir John Francis Davis. All 16 streets were named after persons of great prominence in Great Britain or in Hong Kong, with the location and layout determined according to the position and prominence of the eponymous person:

Street Name	Location	Person named after	Eponym's position
Queen's Road	Central	Queen Victoria	Monarch of Great Britain
Arbuthnot Road	Central	George Arbuthnot	Auditor of the Civil List
Caine Road	Mid-Levels	William Caine	Colonial Secretary of Hong Kong
Cochrane Street	Mid-Levels	Sir Thomas John Cochrane	Commander-in-Chief, East Indies and China Station
D'Aguilar Street	Central	Sir George Charles d'Aguilar	Lieutenant Governor of Hong Kong
Elgin Street	Central	James Bruce, 8th Earl of Elgin and 12th Earl of Kincardine	High Commissioner and Plenipotentiary in China and the Far East
Gough Street	Sheung Wan	Hugh Gough, 1st Viscount Gough	Commander-in-Chief, British Forces in China
Graham Street	Central	Sir James Graham	Home Secretary and First Lord of the Admiralty
Lyndhurst Terrace	Central	John Copley, 1st Baron Lyndhurst	Lord High Chancellor of Great Britain
Peel Street	Mid-Levels	Sir Robert Peel	Prime Minister of Great Britain
Pottinger Street	Central	Sir Henry Pottinger	Governor of Hong Kong
Stanley Street	Central	Edward Smith-Stanley, Baron of Stanley Later 14th Earl of Derby	Colonial Secretary of Great Britain, later Prime Minister of Great Britain
Wellington Street	Central and Sheung Wan	Arthur Wellesley, 1st Duke of Wellington	Field Marshal and Prime Minister of Great Britain
Wyndham Street	Central	William Pedder	Royal Navy Lieutenant, Harbour Master and Marine Magistrate of Hong Kong

== Boundary stones ==
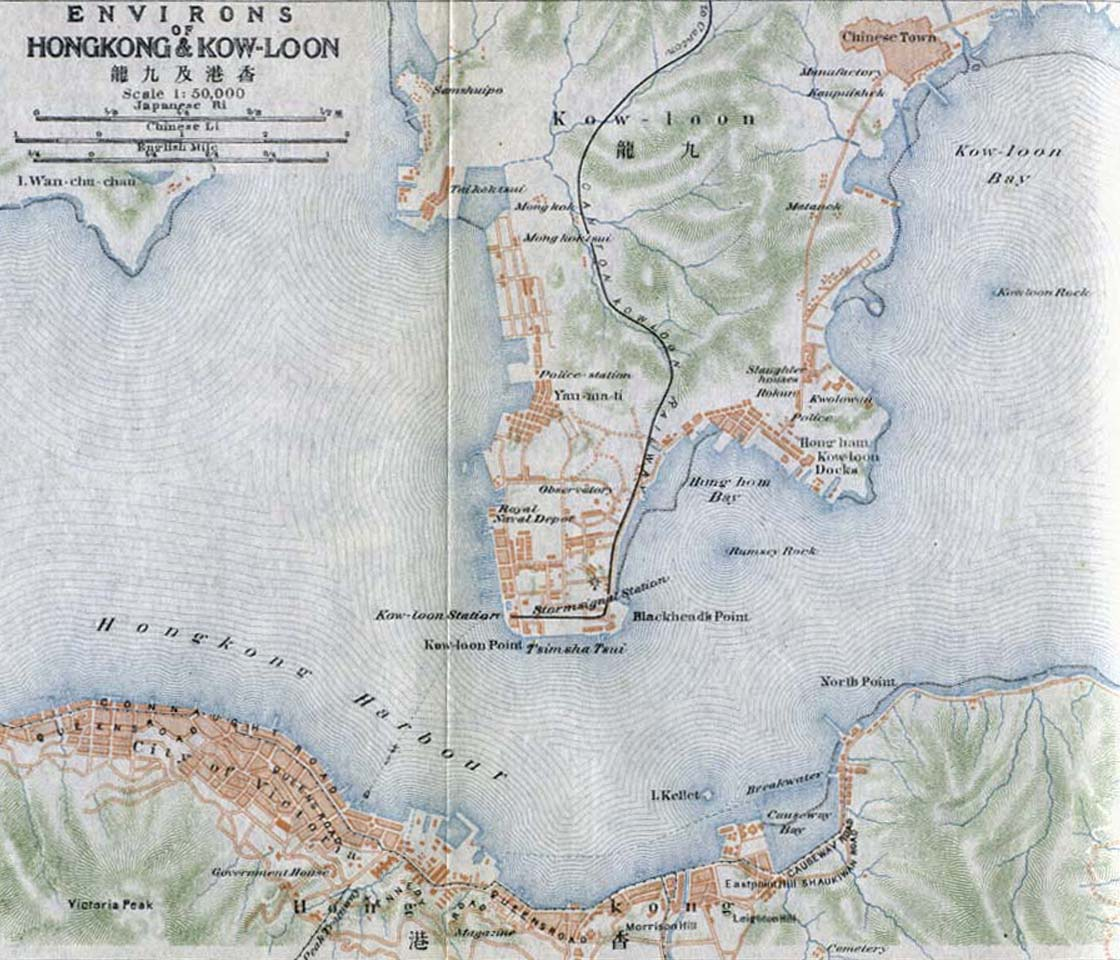
A 1915 map showing Victoria in the north shore of Hong Kong Island (below); Kowloon peninsula (above) was not part of the colony until 1860

In 1903, the Hong Kong Government erected several boundary stones to mark the limits of Victoria, measuring 98 cm in height, tapered at the top and with the inscription "City Boundary 1903". As the city’s boundaries were clearly defined by ordinance, these stones were more just physical markers.

Three additional boundary stones were found in 2021, adding the total of discovered stones to 10, including the one disappeared in June 2007.

Boundary stones of Victoria from west to east
No.	Location	Region	Notes
1	Sai Ning Street	Kennedy Town	Re-erected in Kennedy Town Temporary Playground a few metres away from original location in 1970s
2	Slope of Mount Davis, south of Victoria Road	Mount Davis	Discovered on 12 December 2021
3	Pokfulam Road, near Smithfield	Sandy Bay Gap	
4	Slope of Lung Fu Shan, near Hatton Road	Lung Fu Shan	Discovered on 5 December 2021
5	Hatton Road, near Kotewall Road	Lung Fu Shan	
6	Old Peak Road, near Tregunter Path	Mid-Levels	
7	Magazine Gap Road	Mid-Levels	Removed in June 2007, whereabouts unknown
8	Bowen Road, near Stubbs Road	Mid-Levels	
9	Slope near Rosaryhill School, Stubbs Road	Mid-Levels	Discovered on 12 December 2021
10	Wong Nai Chung Road	Happy Valley	

== Districts ==
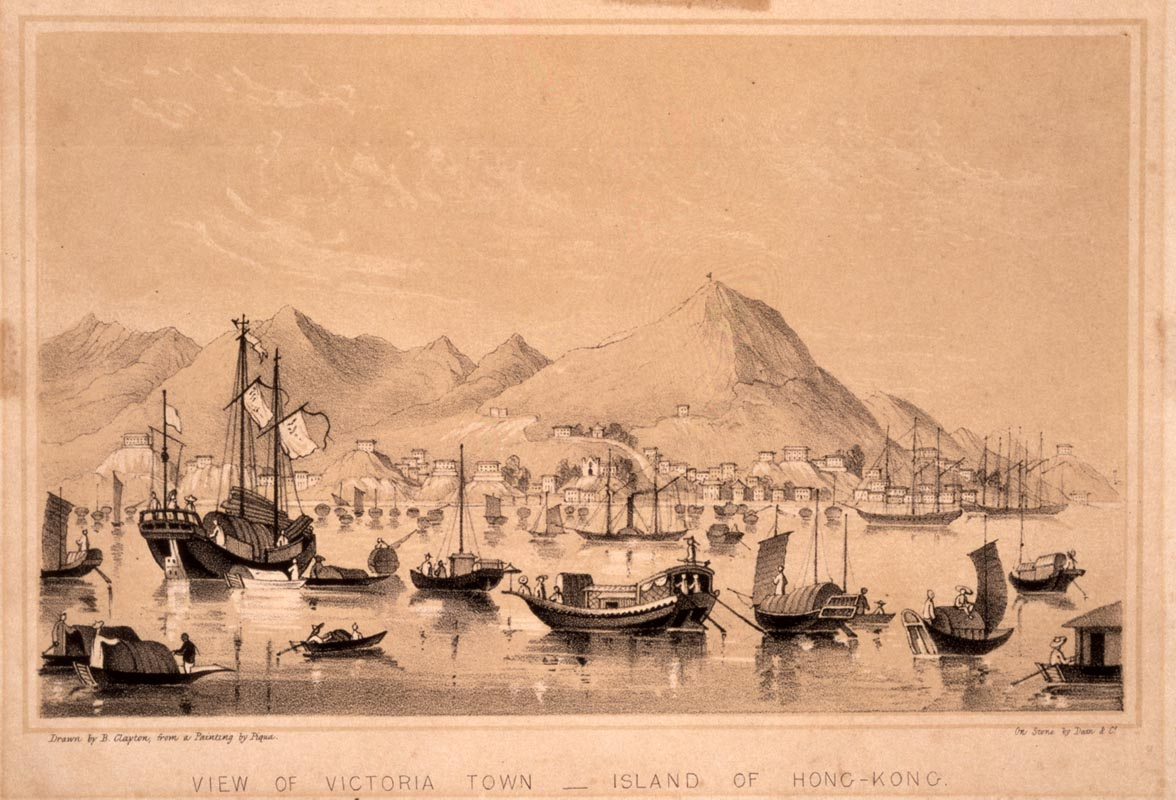
Victoria Town, 1850

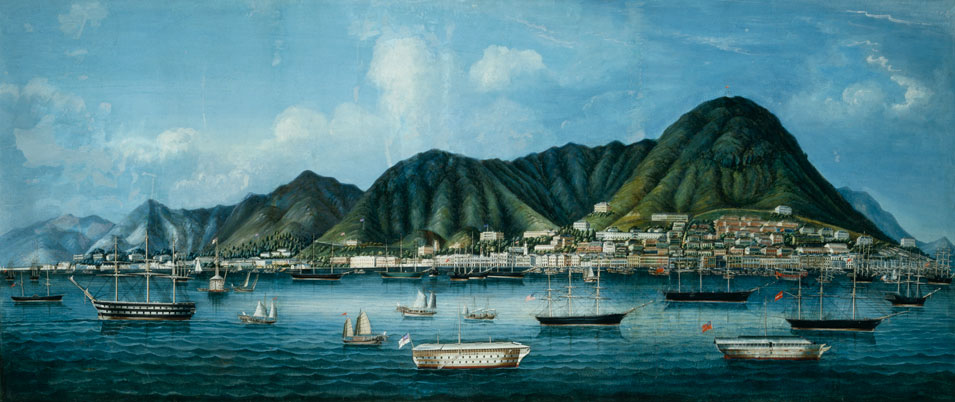
Victoria City, 1860–1865

In 1866 the nine districts, also called yeuks, are:

- Shek Tong Tsui
- Sai Ying Pun
- Taipingshan, a neighborhood near Sheung Wan that shared its name with Victoria Peak
- Sheong Wan
- Choong Wan North and South, known in modern times as Central in English
- Ha Wan, today's Admiralty and Wan Chai
- Wan Chai
- Bowrington, between today's Wan Chai and Causeway Bay, known also as Ngo Keng
- So Kun Poo.

Other places that might be considered as yeuks include:

- Kennedy Town
- Happy Valley
- Causeway Bay

== Territorial designation ==
On 21 May 1982, Sir Crawford Murray MacLehose was made a life peer, weeks after the end of his governorship in Hong Kong. His peerage was announced on 31 December 1981 in the 1982 New Years Honours. He was therefore styled as Baron MacLehose of Beoch, of Maybole in the District of Kyle and Carrick, and of Victoria in Hong Kong. Victoria was listed as the barony's territorial designation, alongside MacLehose's hometown Maybole. The barony went extinct on 27 May 2000 when MacLehose died.

== See also ==
- History of Hong Kong
- List of buildings, sites and areas in Hong Kong
- List of places named for Queen Victoria § Hong Kong, for a list of places named after Queen Victoria
- Praya
- British overseas cities
  - George Town, Penang
  - City of Singapore (historical entity)
