= Harton =

Harton may refer to:

- Harton, North Yorkshire, a village and civil parish in North Yorkshire, England
- Harton, Shropshire, a hamlet in the parish of Eaton-under-Heywood, Shropshire, England
- Harton, South Shields, a settlement in South Tyneside, Tyne and Wear, England
- Harton, Devon, a former name of the town of Hartland in Devon, England
- West Harton, South Shields

== See also ==
- Hatton (disambiguation)
