= Harlech Road =

Road in Hong Kong

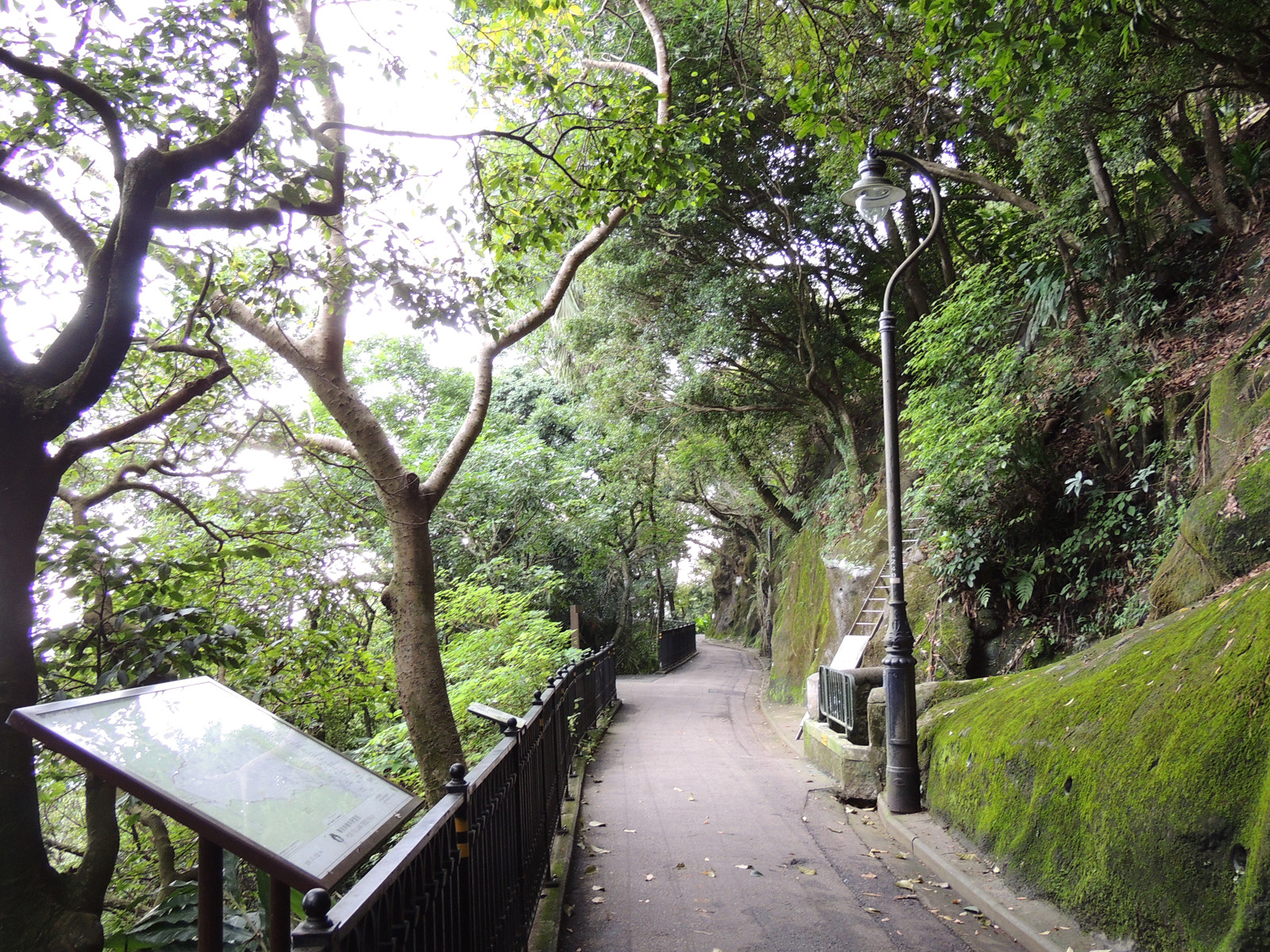
Harlech Road

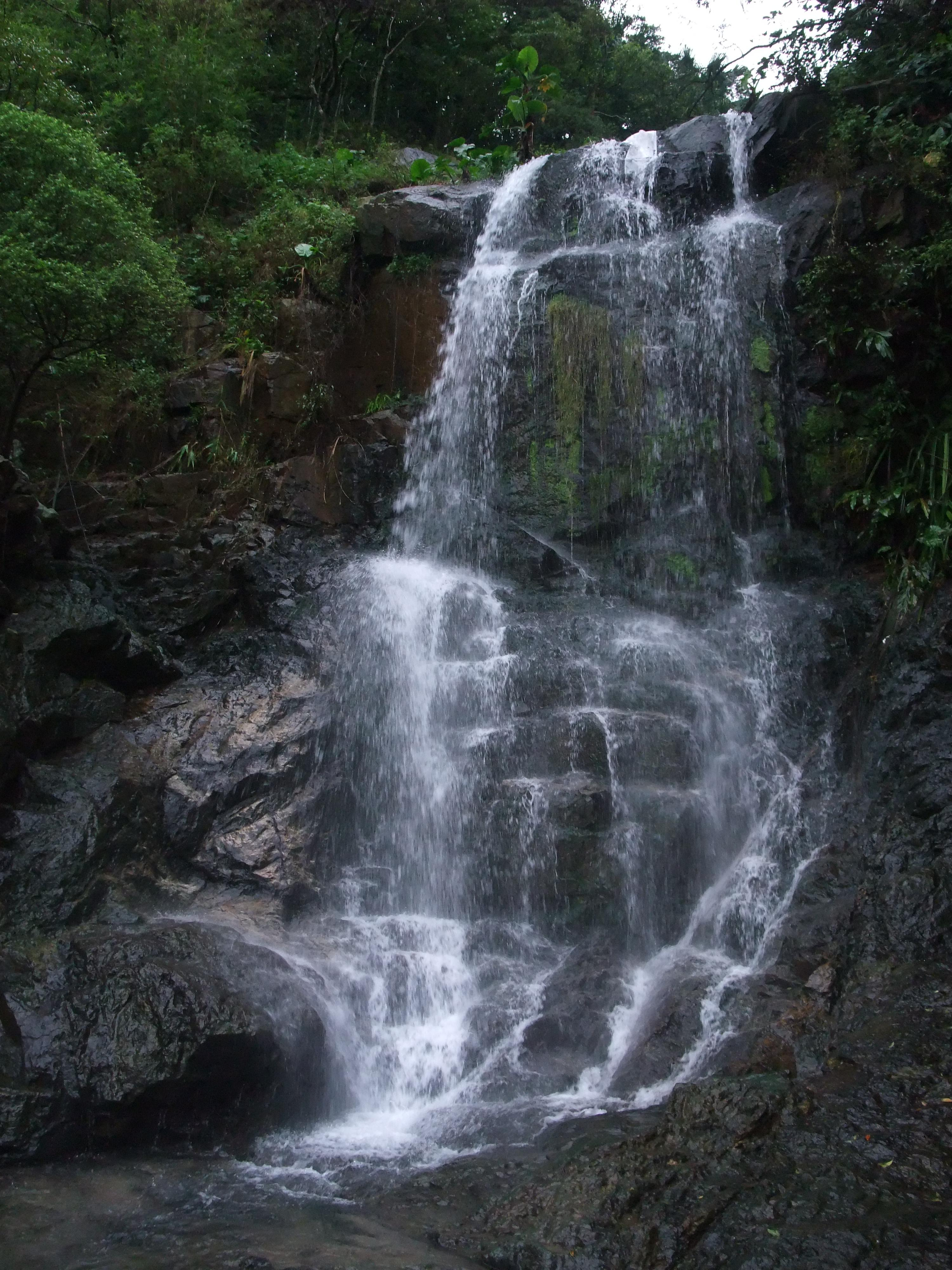
Waterfall of Victoria Peak

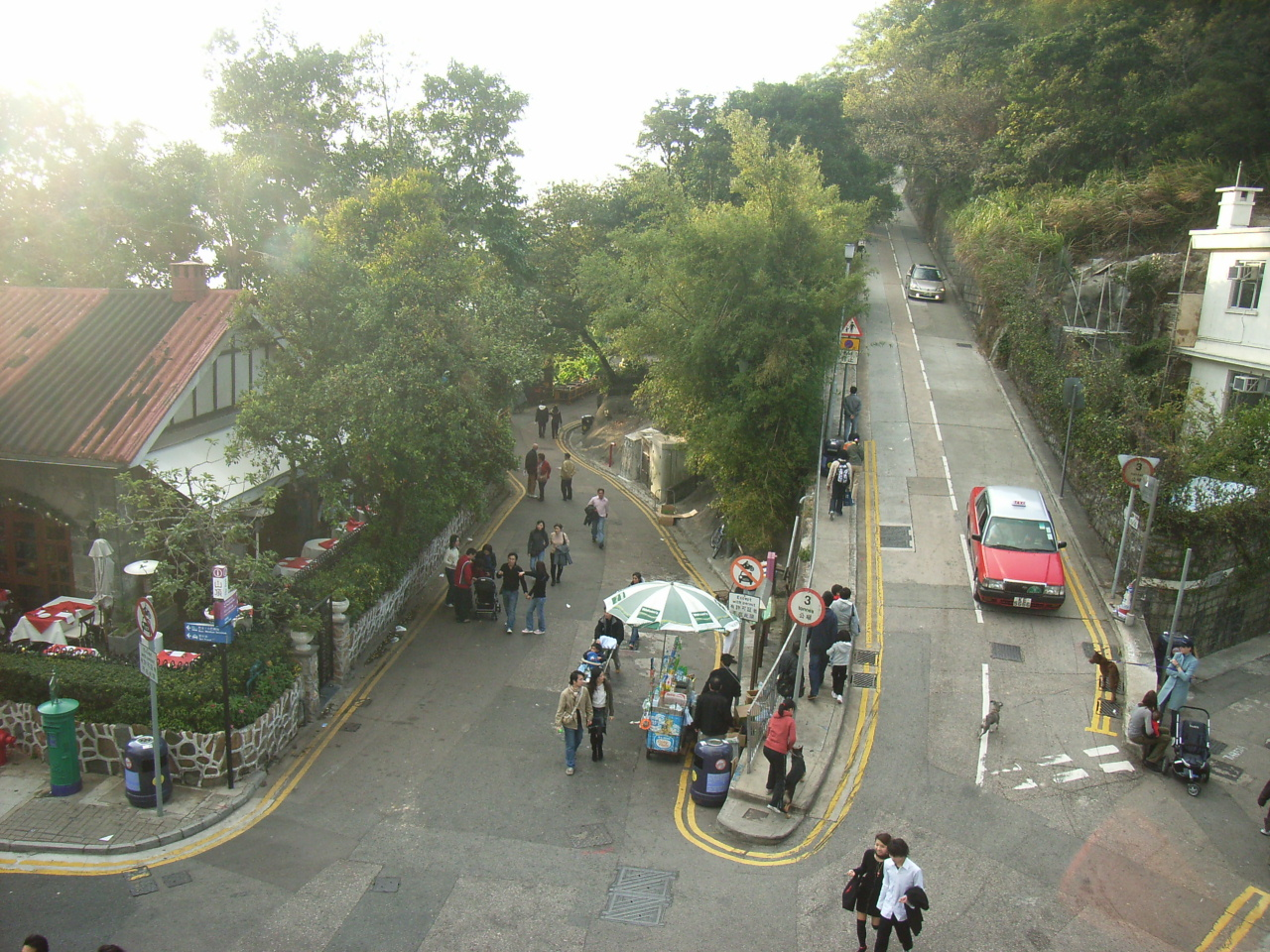
Roads meet at Victoria Gap. Harlech Road is the road on the front left.

Harlech Road (Chinese: 夏力道) is a road in Hong Kong. It is high up in the Peak area of Hong Kong Island. The road starts at Victoria Gap, then goes along the south slope of Victoria Peak, then crosses High West Gap, and goes along the north slope of High West, and finally ends at the ridge of High West.

Harlech Road is not open to motor vehicles except with permits and spans two country parks in Hong Kong, one Pok Fu Lam Country Park and the other Lung Fu Shan Country Park. The road is good for hiking.

The road was built before 1906. It meets several roads, namely Mount Austin Road, Lugard Road, Peak Road, Old Peak Road, Findlay Road and Hatton Road.
