= Hatton Road =

Street in Hong Kong

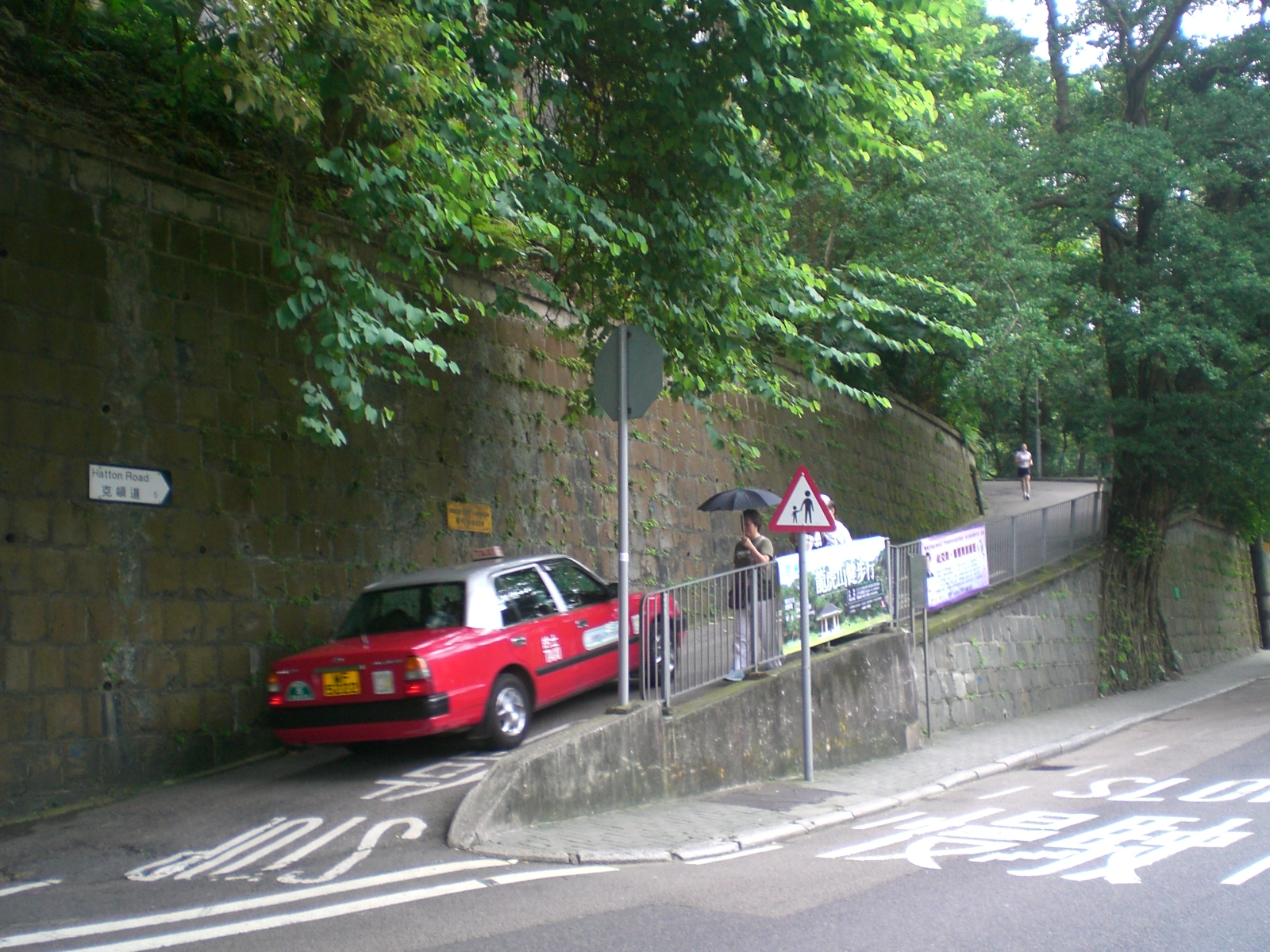
- The northern end, at the junction with Conduit/Kotewall Road
- Interactive map of Hatton Road
- Type: Walking, cycling and exercise road
- Length: 1.8 km (1.1 mi)
- From: Conduit Road and Kotewall Road
- To: Lugard Road and Harlech Road

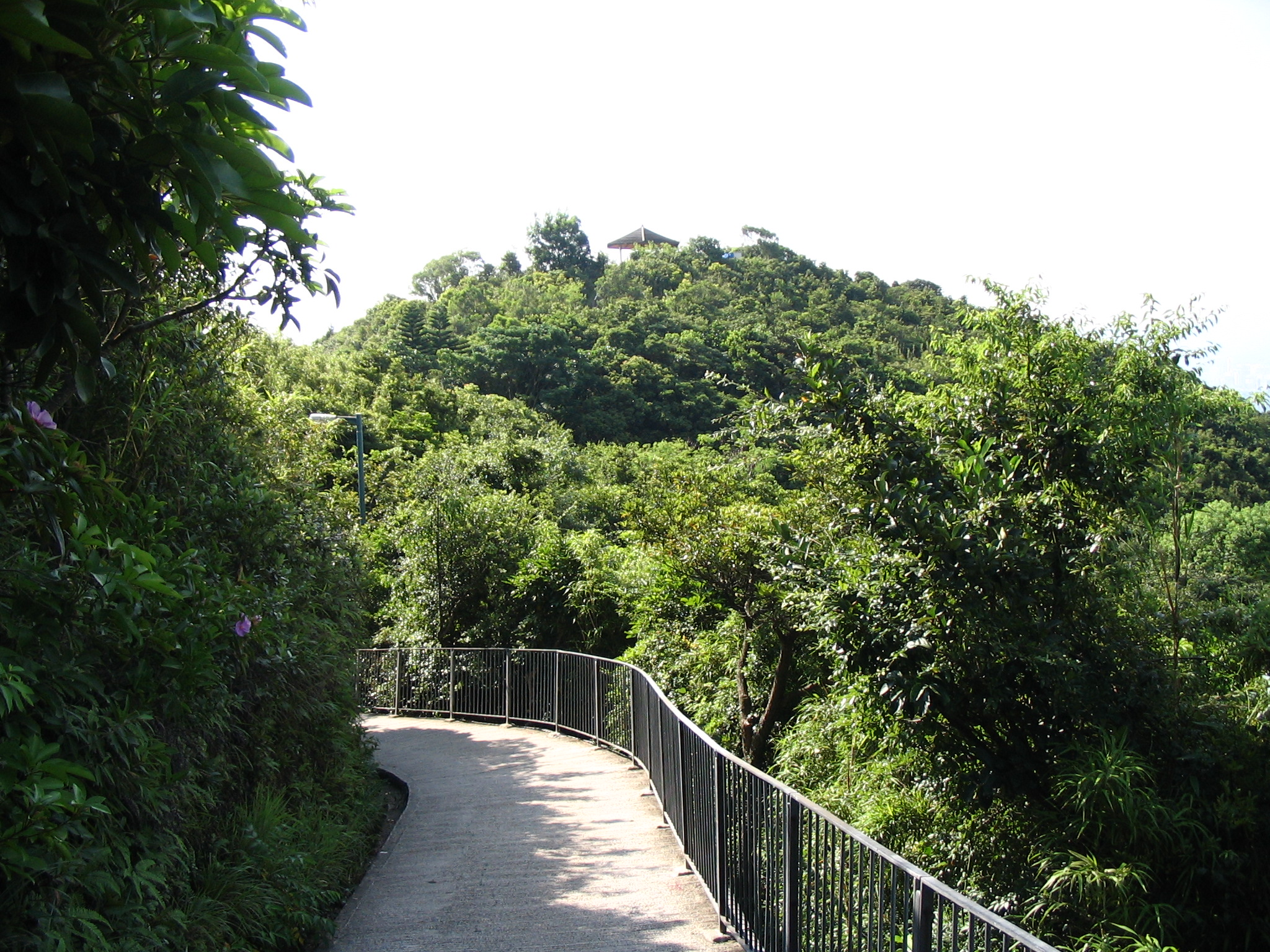
A section of the road

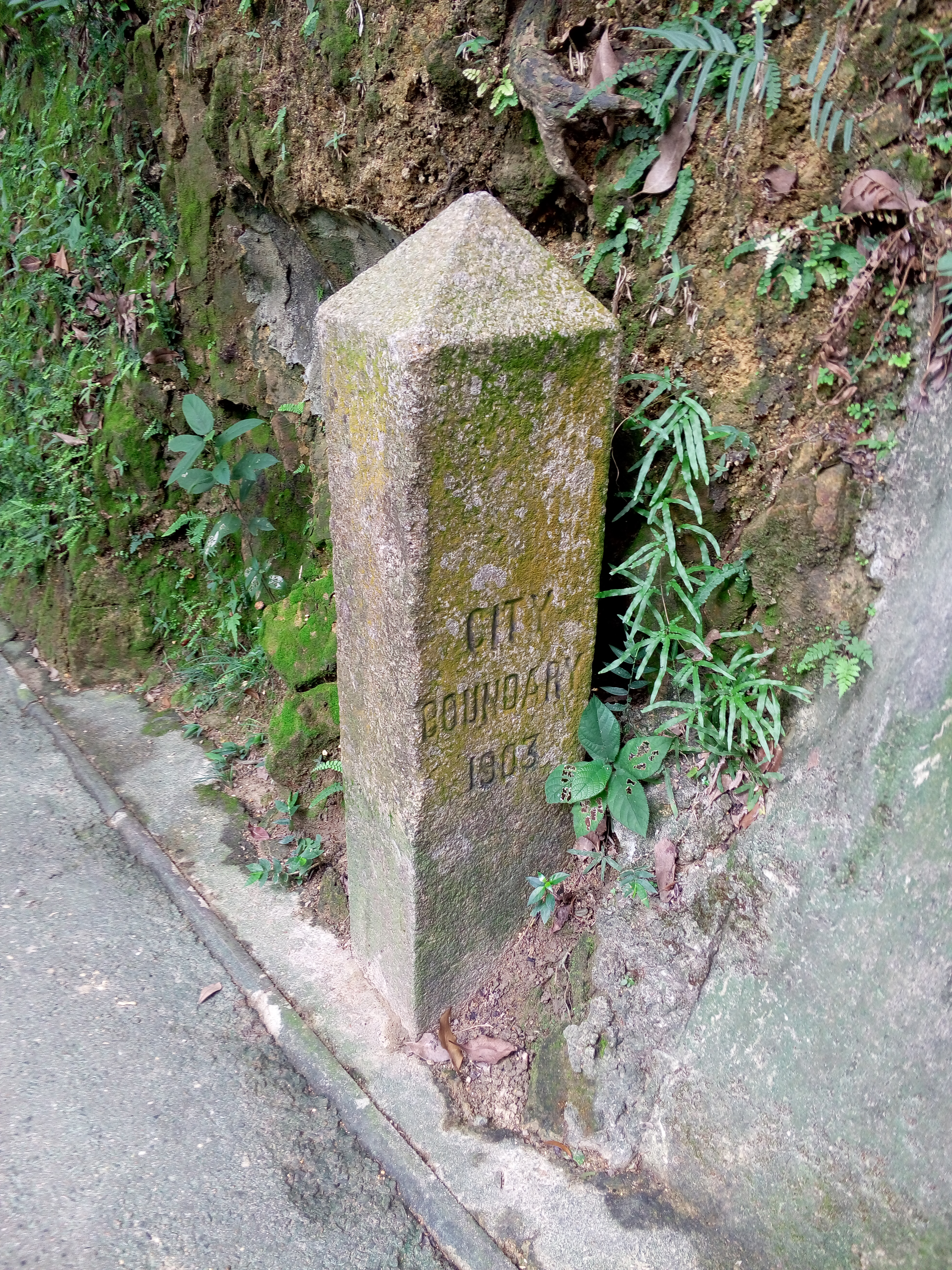
Boundary stone of the City of Victoria on Hatton Road

Hatton Road (Chinese: 克頓道), also known as "The Morning Trail", is a paved, steep, motor vehicle-free road in western Hong Kong Island, Hong Kong, on Lung Fu Shan. It is largely used as a fitness trail for walking, running, and cycling.

== Description ==
The road measures 1,800 metres (5,900 ft) in length. It starts north at the junction with Conduit Road, where it becomes Kotewall Road, at western Mid-Levels overlooking the University of Hong Kong, which is also the terminus of NWFB Route 13. There are a few residential apartments along before the road overpasses Po Shan Road. It then winds into the forests to the south and divides Lung Fu Shan and Pok Fu Lam Country Parks.

The road ends southeast at a camping and resting ground near High West, where it intersects Lugard and Harlech roads, both leading to Victoria Peak. Hikers may also continue following a small path nearby leading to the tip of High West. Pinewood Battery, a former anti-aircraft defense built in 1903 can be reached via a footpath branching off Hatton Road (Route 134 10).

== Features ==
One of the seven boundary stones of the City of Victoria, and the only one being at the original location, is laid on Hatton Road about 400 metres (1,300 ft) from its northern end. On the stone is the inscription "City Boundary 1903" and an information board about the stone is few metres away from it.
