= Hatting =

Hatting may refer to:

- Hatmaking
- Hatting, Denmark
  - Hatting Parish in Horsens Municipality, Denmark
- Hatting, Tyrol, Austria
- Hatting, Upper Austria, Austria, in Sankt Marienkirchen am Hausruck
- John Hatting, ex-husband and singing partner of Lise Haavik

== See also ==
- Hattin (disambiguation)
