= Hattin (disambiguation) =

Hattin is an alternative transliteration for Hittin, a Palestinian village. Hattin may also refer to:

- Battle of Hattin in 1187, in which Saladin conquered most of Palestine from the Crusaders
- Horns of Hattin, an extinct volcano with twin peaks overlooking the plains of Hattin
- Heather Hattin (born 1961), a Canadian rower
- Donald E. Hattin (1928–2016), an American geologist and geology professor
- Kurn Hattin Homes for Children, a non-profit located in Westminster, Vermont

== See also ==
- Hatting (disambiguation)
- Hatton (disambiguation)
