= Hatton-Brown Publishers =

American publishing company

The Hatton-Brown organization in Montgomery, Alabama, dates back to 1948, when local newspaperman Hartwell Hatton founded Hatton Publications at age 49. His first forest-oriented magazine, Alabama Lumberman, was published from 1949 to 1957.

Hartwell Hatton

== History ==
Hatton, Brown & Co., Inc. was established in 1953, the same year the company started a new Southern regional logging title, Pulpwood Production. At 33, Charles Cline joined the company as editor in the summer of 1953 and helped get the first issue into print that August. Pulpwood Production's title was lengthened to Pulpwood Production & Saw Mill Logging in 1956, and its circulation was extended into the Lake States and New England in 1962. Dianne Sullivan joined the company as circulation manager in 1964.

In 1966 and 1967 Hatton and Cline searched for a full-time advertising salesman and editor. David Ramsey joined the staff as sales manager in February 1968 and David Knight joined the company 30 days later as an editor.

Mr. Hatton retired in 1971 selling his stock to Charles Cline, David Ramsey and David Knight. Dianne Sullivan then became the office manager.

== Publications ==
Anticipating the need for an economical logging newspaper in the South, Hatton-Brown launched Loggin' Times (later titled Southern Loggin' Times) in 1972. In late 1974, sensing a change like the traditional pulpwood market, management decided to phase in a new name for Pulpwood Production & Saw Mill Logging. The latter part of the title was dropped and replaced with the words, Timber Harvesting. The journal carried a double title until it went national in 1977 and became more fittingly known as Timber Harvesting. In 1977 Timber Processing Industry, (later shortened to Timber Processing) began as a regional tabloid newspaper for the sawmill Industry and remained so until 1978. In 1979 Timber Processing became a national sawmill magazine.

In 1981 Charles Cline retired and David Ramsey and David Knight became the new owners. Ramsey and Knight formed a new corporation Hatton-Brown Publishers, Inc. Dianne Sullivan became secretary of the corporation, was named general manager and joined the owners on the board of directors.

In June of that year, the company moved from 458 S. Lawrence St. to larger facilities at 610 S. McDonough St.

In 1981 David Ramsey, David Knight and some key employees of Hatton-Brown purchased another publication. A separate corporation, Plywood and Panel World, Inc., was formed to purchase a magazine known as Plywood & Panel. This journal, officially acquired in January 1982, was subsequently renamed Plywood & Panel World and later Panel World.

Hatton-Brown has also published the official program for various logging equipment expositions through the years. Some of these included: Timber Harvesting Expo-SE in south Georgia and Carolina Log'n Demo in eastern North Carolina.

In late 1988, with employment practically double the number of 1981, the company owners elected to build a new and larger office building at the corner of Clay and Hanrick Streets in Montgomery. The building was completed and occupied in April 1990. The official open house followed on June 7, 1990.

Hatton-Brown diversified its publishing interests in January 1991 by acquiring its first non-forestry or paper-related title, Chain Saw Age & Power Equipment Trade. To position the publication for expanded outdoor power equipment advertising opportunities, the company in January 1992, officially changed the publication's title to Power Equipment Trade.

In 1995 Hatton-Brown purchased its first consumer publication, IronWorks, a nine-times-per-year upscale magazine appealing to Harley-Davidson motorcycle enthusiasts. Dennis Stemp, founder of the magazine remained as editor until his death.

Hatton-Brown purchased another wood products magazine, Southern Lumberman, in the late summer of 1999. This publication has been published under this title since 1881, making it the oldest forestry related trade magazine in the country.
