= Hatton railway station =

Hatton railway station may refer to:

- Hatton railway station (Aberdeenshire), in Scotland
- Hatton railway station (Tayside), a closed railway station in Scotland
- Hatton railway station (Sri Lanka)
- Hatton railway station (England), in Hatton, Warwickshire

== See also ==
- Tutbury and Hatton railway station in Staffordshire
