= Hatton Hill, Antigua and Barbuda =

Coordinates: 17°7′1″N 61°51′17″W

Hatton Hill
- Village
- Interactive map of the Hatton Hill main place
- Country: Antigua and Barbuda
- Parish: Saint John

Area
  - Total: 0.294 km^{2} (0.114 sq mi)

Population (2011)
  - Total: 234

Hatton Hill is a village in Saint John, Antigua and Barbuda. It had a population of 234 people in 2011.

== Geography ==
According to the Antigua and Barbuda Statistics Division, the village had a total area of 0.294 square kilometres in 2011.

== Demographics ==
There were 234 people living in Hatton Hill as of the 2011 census. The village was 88.21% African, 5.66% Hispanic, 3.30% other mixed, 1.42% some other ethnicity, 0.94% East Indian, and 0.47% not stated. The population was born in different countries, including 67.92% in Antigua and Barbuda, 8.49% in Dominica, 6.60% in Guyana, 5.66% in Jamaica, 4.25% in the Dominican Republic, and 2.36% in the United States. The population had diverse religious affiliations, including 27.96% Moravian, 14.22% Anglican, 11.85% Adventist, and 7.58% Roman Catholic.
