= High West =

Mountain on Hong Kong Island, Hong Kong

- 西高山
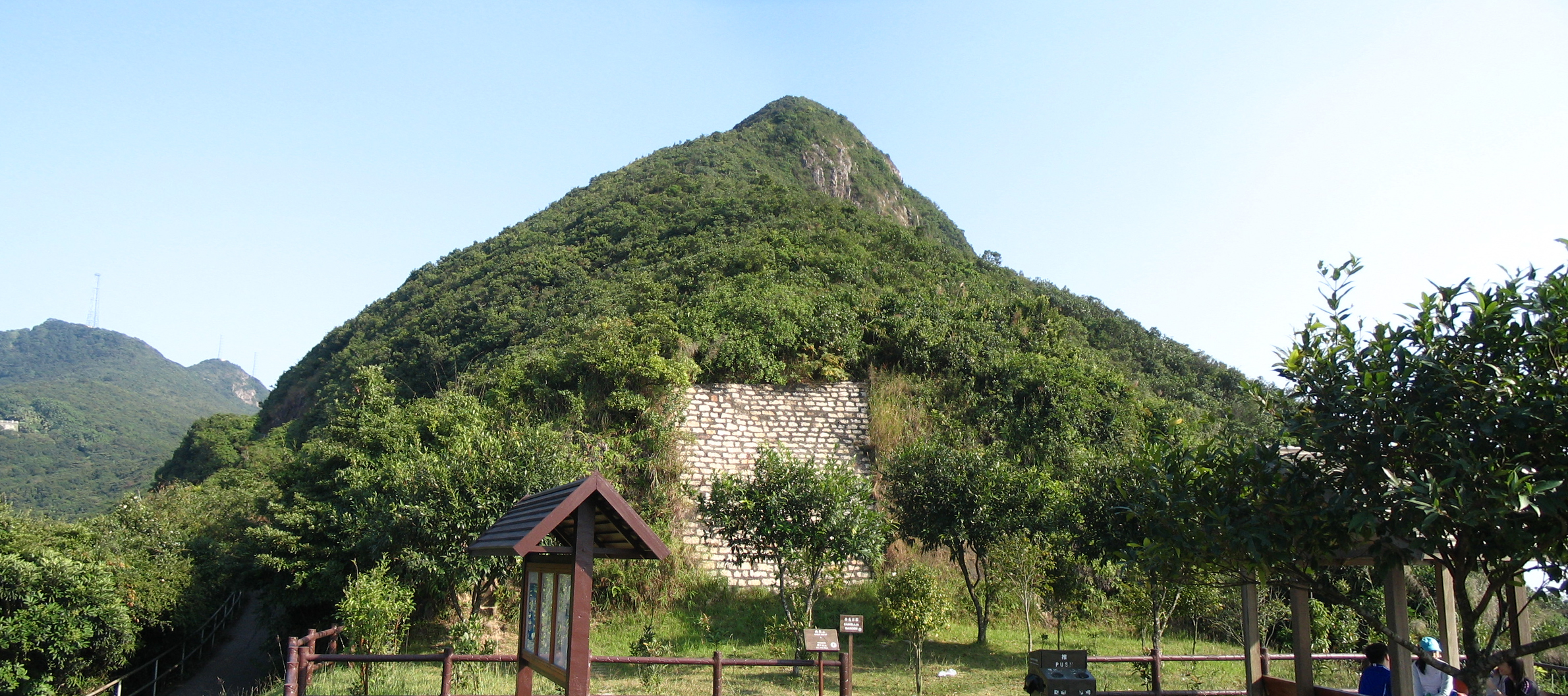
- High West from Lung Fu Shan View Compass

Highest point
- Elevation: 494 m (1,621 ft); HKPD
- Coordinates: 22°16′20.83″N 114°8′10.65″E

Naming
- Native name: 西高山 (Chinese)

Geography
- Location within Hong Kong
- Location: Hong Kong Island

High West
- Chinese: 西高山
Transcriptions
Standard Mandarin
- Hanyu Pinyin: Xī Gāoshān
Yue: Cantonese
- Jyutping: sai1 gou1 saan1

High West or Sai Ko Shan, is a mountain on Hong Kong Island with a height of 494 m (1,621 ft).

It is in Central and Western District.

== Geography ==
High West is located within Pok Fu Lam Country Park and straddles the boundary of Central and Western District and Southern District. It is west of Victoria Peak, north of Pok Fu Lam and south of Lung Fu Shan. Queen Mary Hospital is at its west slope.

Harlech, Hatton and Lugard Roads terminate at a junction on its north slope. On clear days, visitors can see Tai Mo Shan to the north, Castle Peak to the north-west, Lantau Peak to the west, Tate's Cairn to the north-east and Lamma Island to the south.

== Access ==
Unlike nearby Victoria Peak, there are no roads or cable cars up High West. East of the summit, a recently renovated trail near the junction of Hatton, Lugard and Harlech Roads leads to the top. West of the summit starting from Lung Fu Shan View Compass, there is a rock climb of about 180 metres that leads to the top for rock-climbing experts. This climb is treacherous and is not safe on windy or wet days.

== See also ==
- List of mountains, peaks and hills in Hong Kong
