= Mount Davis, Hong Kong =

Mountain in Hong Kong

Mount Davis
- 摩星嶺
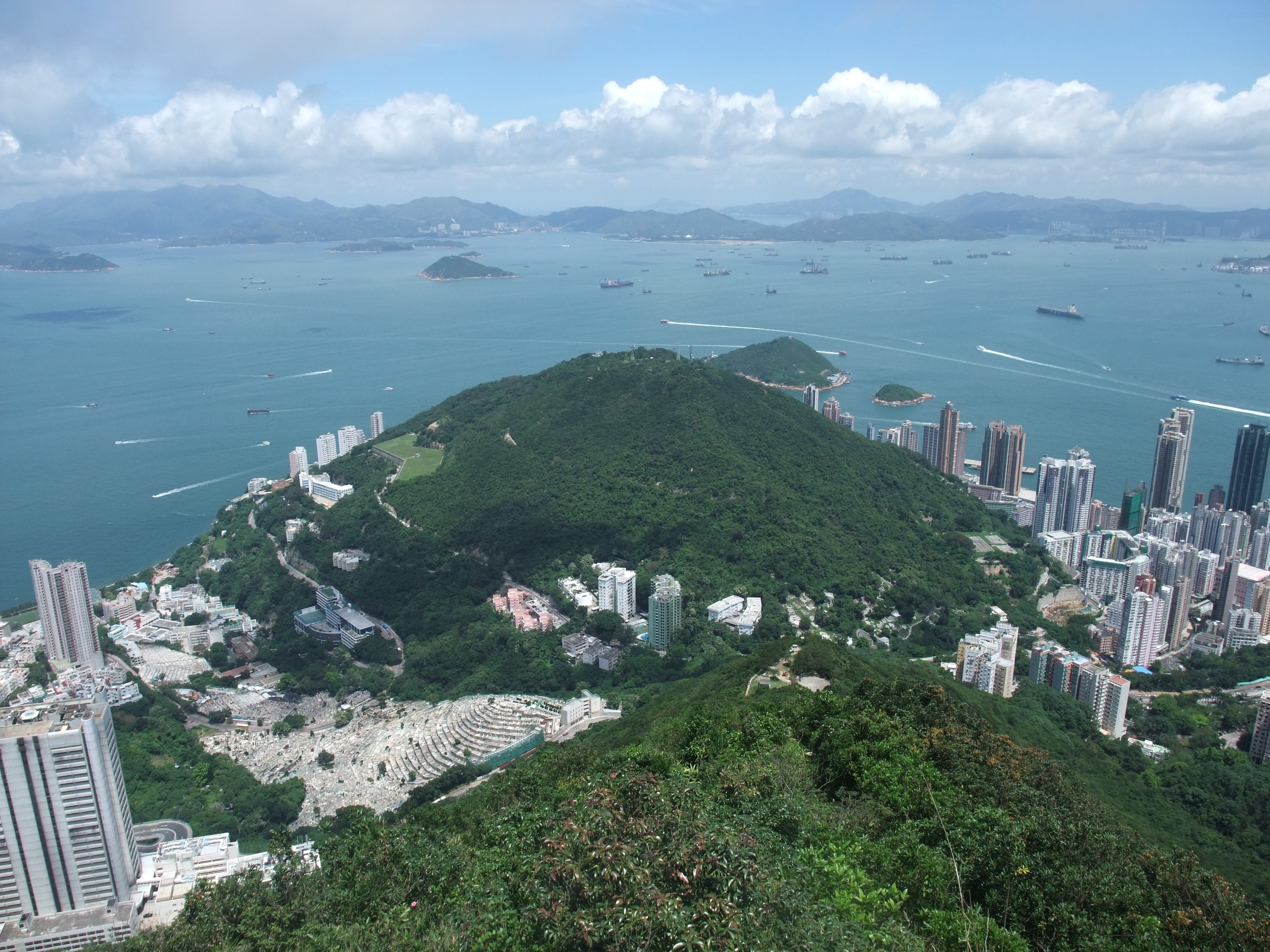
- A view of Mount Davis from High West

Highest point
- Elevation: 269 m (883 ft)
- Coordinates: 22.277028°N 114.124789°E

Geography
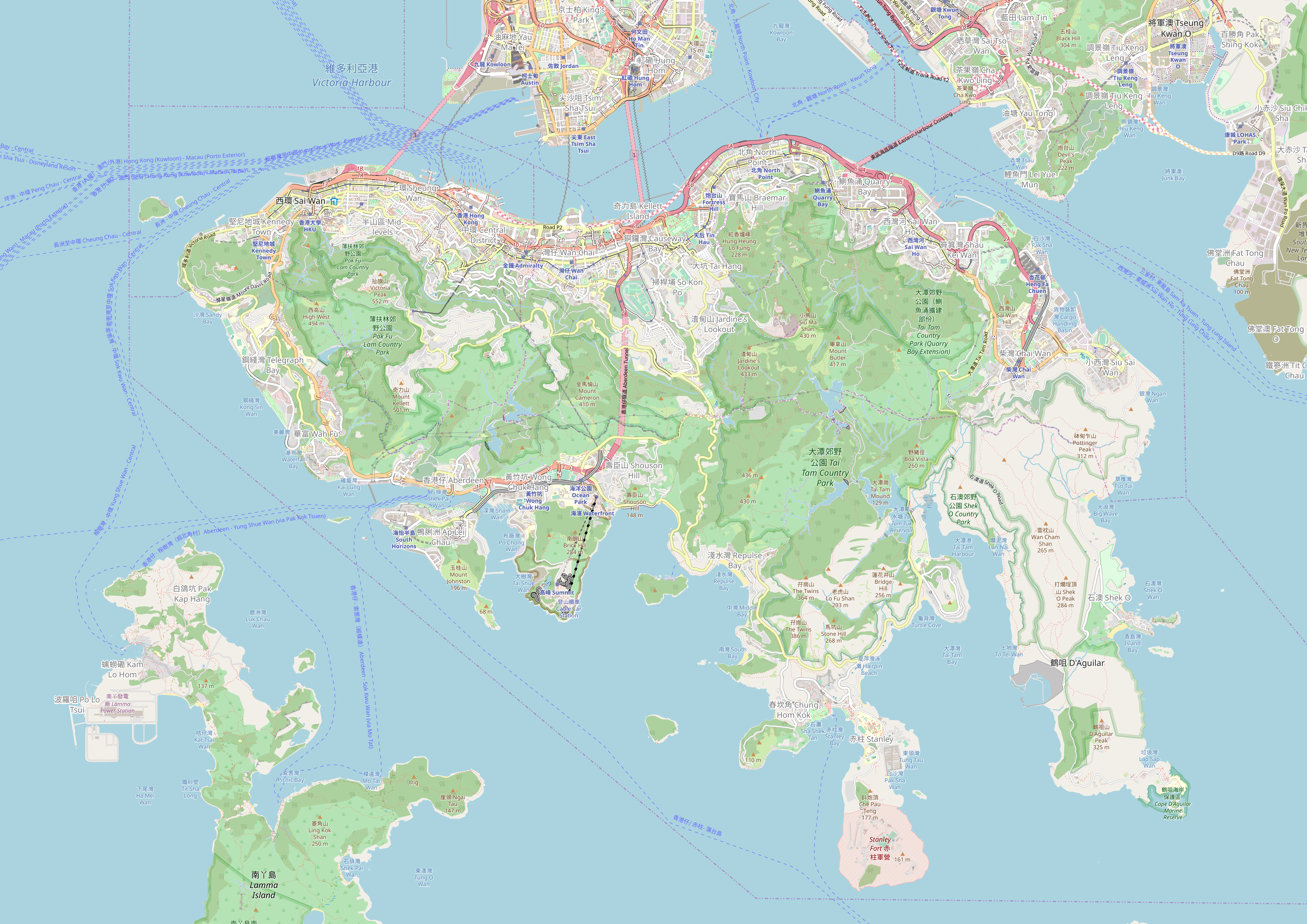
- Location within Hong Kong Island
- Location: Hong Kong

Mount Davis, Hong Kong
- Traditional Chinese: 摩星嶺
- Simplified Chinese: 摩星岭
Transcriptions
Standard Mandarin
- Hanyu Pinyin: Móxīnglǐng
Yue: Cantonese
- Yale Romanization: Mō sīng léhng
- Jyutping: Mo1 sing1 leng5

Mount Davis (Chinese: 摩星嶺) or Mo Sing Leng is an area surrounding and including the westernmost hill on Hong Kong Island, Hong Kong. It is 269 m tall. Home to mostly luxury residences, Mount Davis was originally settled after the construction of Victoria Road by prominent Hong Kong families who were unable to live on Peak due to the zoning restriction in Peak District Reservation Ordinance, 1904.

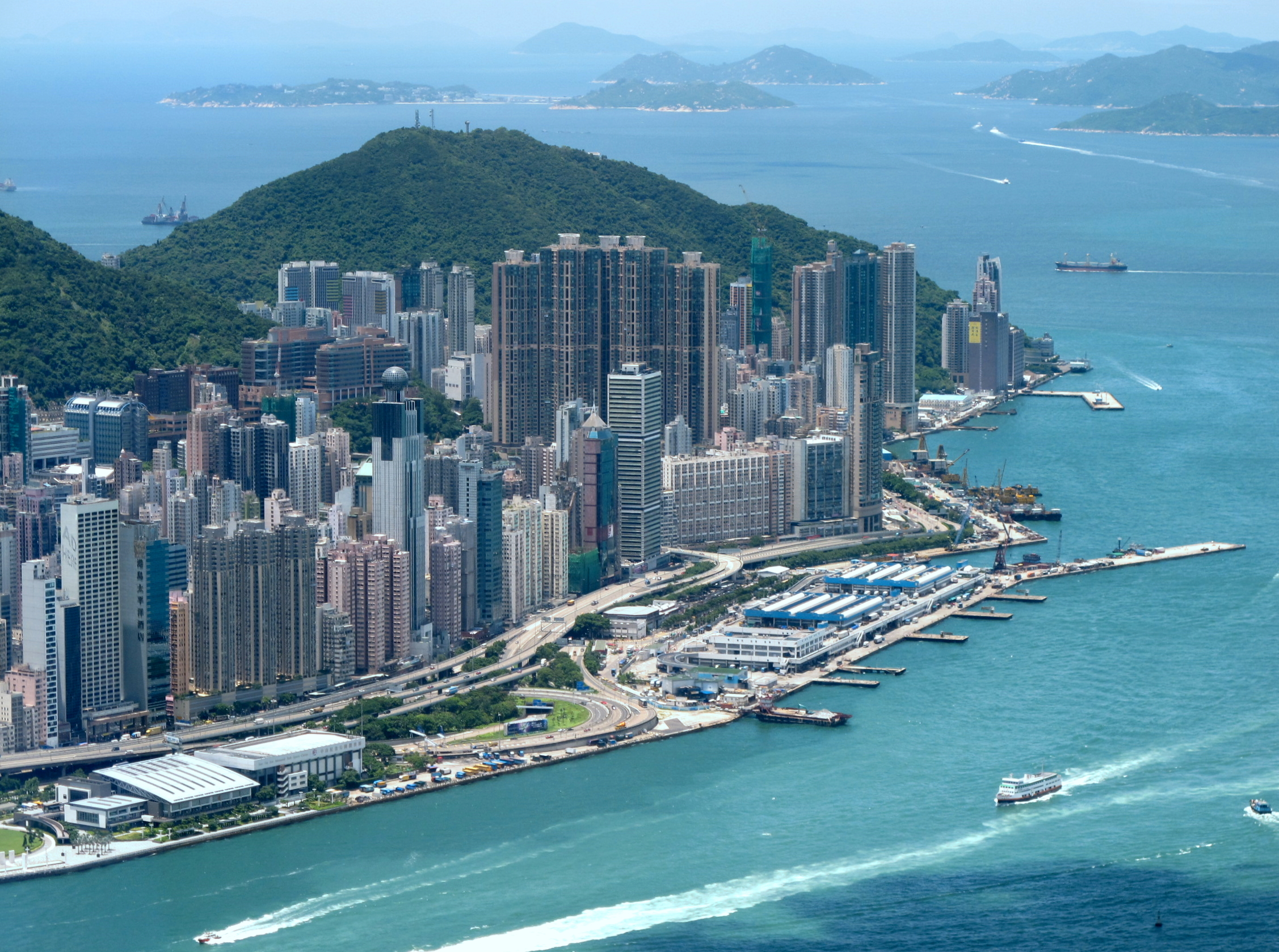
Mount Davis and Kennedy Town.

It is named after Sir John Francis Davis, who was the 2nd governor of Hong Kong, from 1844 to 1848.

The summit is reached via Mount Davis Path, which comes off Mount Davis Road and Victoria Road.

== History ==
It was an important artillery depot of the British forces since 1911 (proposed in 1900). Five (later three) 9.2-inch guns were installed. It was heavily bombed by Japanese planes during the Battle of Hong Kong. The depot was later demolished by British defences towards the end of the battle.

== Geology ==
The geology of Mount Davis comprises dominantly pyroclastic rocks of the Cretaceous Repulse Bay Volcanic Group. This same kind of rock is common in the south of Hong Kong Island and the east and north New Territories. The rock type in Mount Davis is mainly coarse ash crystal tuff.

== Features ==
Hong Kong Jockey Club Mount Davis Youth Hostel, operated by Hong Kong Youth Hostel Association, is located at 123 Mount Davis Path and it offers a panoramic view of Victoria Harbour. The hostel underwent a HK$9.54 million renovation funded by the Hong Kong Jockey Club, and re-opened in 2012. The hostel offers beds in dormitories, as well as two, four and six bed rooms. Self-catering facilities are provided, but no restaurant is available. The hostel provides a free shuttle service to Shun Tak Centre in Sheung Wan.

There is an ionospheric station housing an ionosonde. The ionosonde was set up in a refurbished bunkhouse by Oulton Walker and Tim Closs of the University of Hong Kong Physics department in 1969. There are also microwave towers.

The eastern side of the hill holds the Chiu Yuen Cemetery, a cemetery for the Eurasian community where many members of the influential Hotung family are buried. While Kennedy Town is on the north side, the southern and western sides are mostly low-rise developments, primarily residential but also home to West Island School.

== See also ==
- List of mountains, peaks and hills in Hong Kong
- Kennedy Town
- High West Peak
- Pok Fu Lam
