= Pinewood Battery =

Former artillery battery in Hong Kong

Coordinates: 22.277744°N 114.135771°E

- Traditional Chinese: 松林炮台
Transcriptions
Yue: Cantonese
- Yale Romanization: Sūng làhm paau tòih
- Jyutping: Sung1 lam4 paau3 toi4

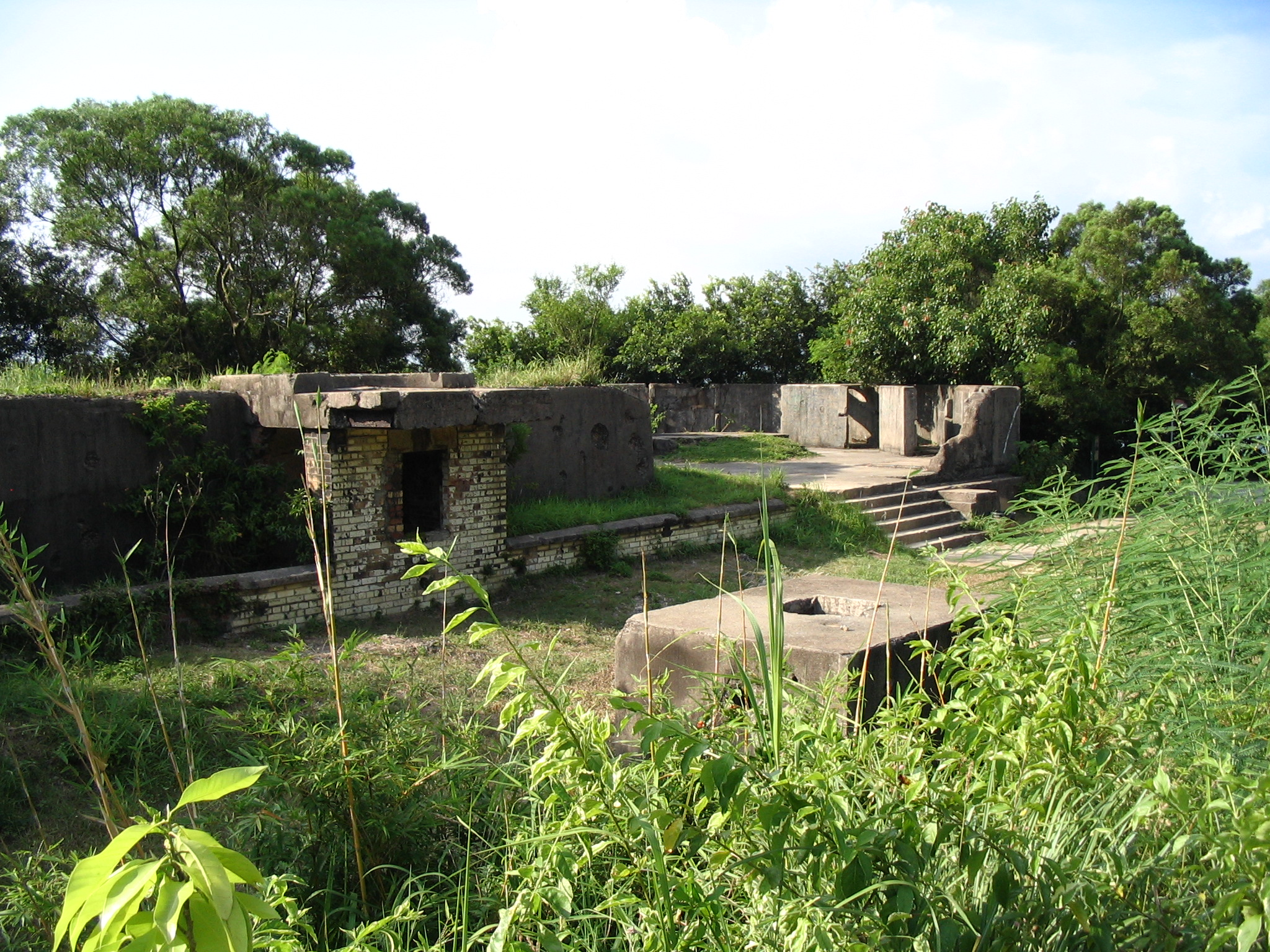
View of Pinewood Battery

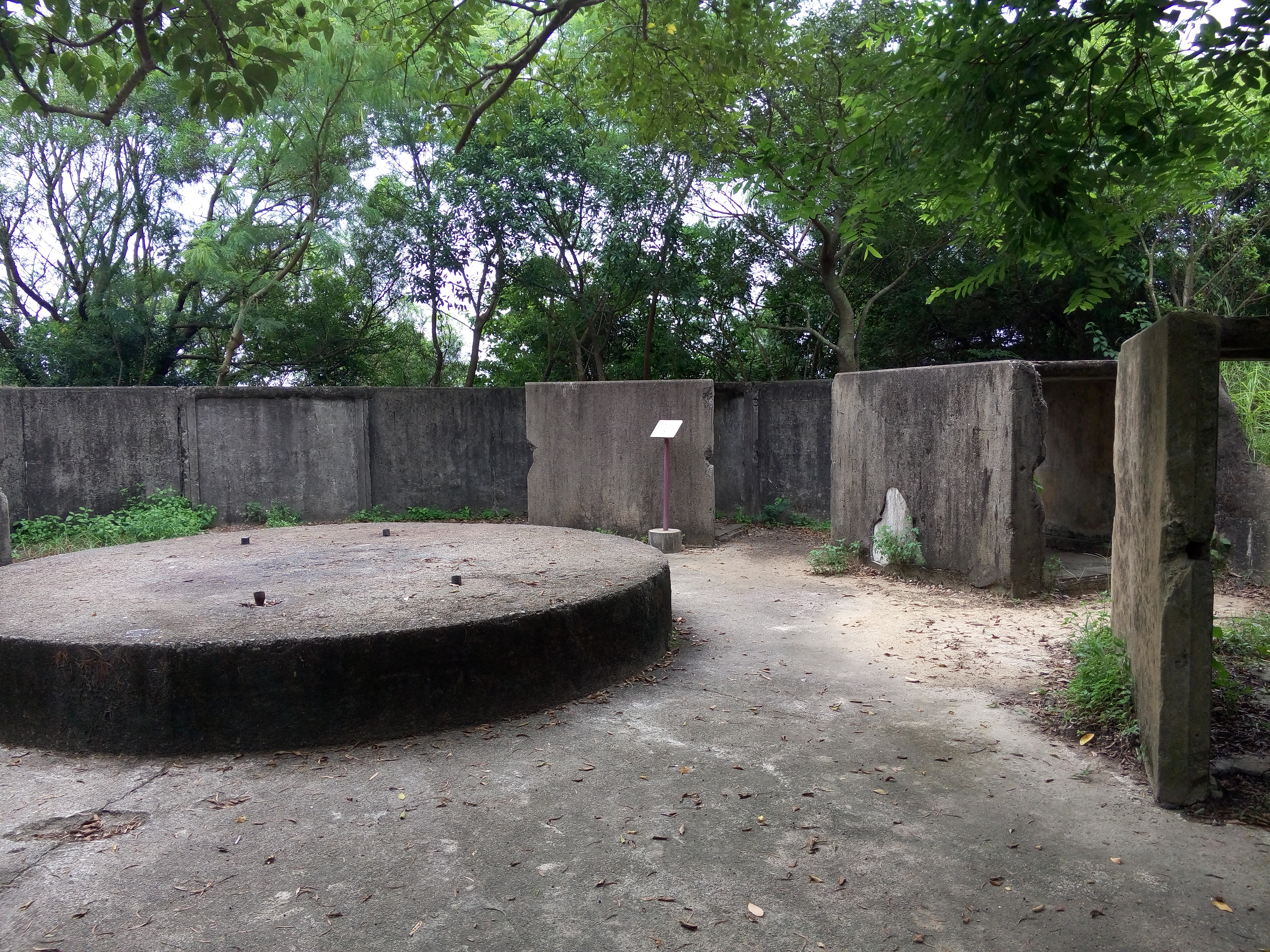
Ruins of Pinewood Battery

Pinewood Battery is a historic military site in Hong Kong, located 307 metres (1,007 ft) above sea level, within Lung Fu Shan Country Park, in the northwestern part of Hong Kong Island.

== History ==
Construction of the battery started in 1901 and finished in 1905. During the Battle of Hong Kong, the Battery came under repeated air raids. On 15 December 1941, the Japanese 23rd Army Air Group carried out extensive attacks on Hong Kong Island. Pinewood Battery, manned by the 17th AA Battery 5th Anti-Air Regiment Royal Artillery, was severely damaged. The raid caused one death and one injury. One of the antiaircraft guns and certain other facilities were destroyed. The commander of the defending troops decided to abandon the battery, and all men were ordered to retreat on that day.

== Conservation status ==
All the old battery buildings are in a ruinous condition and two of the old magazines were demolished in fairly recent times. The military structures on Pinewood Battery received a Grade II conservation status in 2009. A heritage trail has been created on the site, which is also part of the Central and Western Heritage Trail, Western District and the Peak Route. The site and the buildings are managed by the Leisure and Cultural Services Department, while maintenance is the responsibility of the Architectural Services Department.

== The site today ==
The area has been converted into a picnic site. Interpretive signs are erected to illustrate the historical significance of this Battery.

With its excellent environment, the Battery became a spot for wargaming. To prevent further damage to the site, the Country and Marine Parks Authority, AFCD set up a warning sign on the site, stating that "using or possession of any firearm, airgun, propelling or releasing instrument are prohibited". However, many plastic BB bullets are still found on the site.

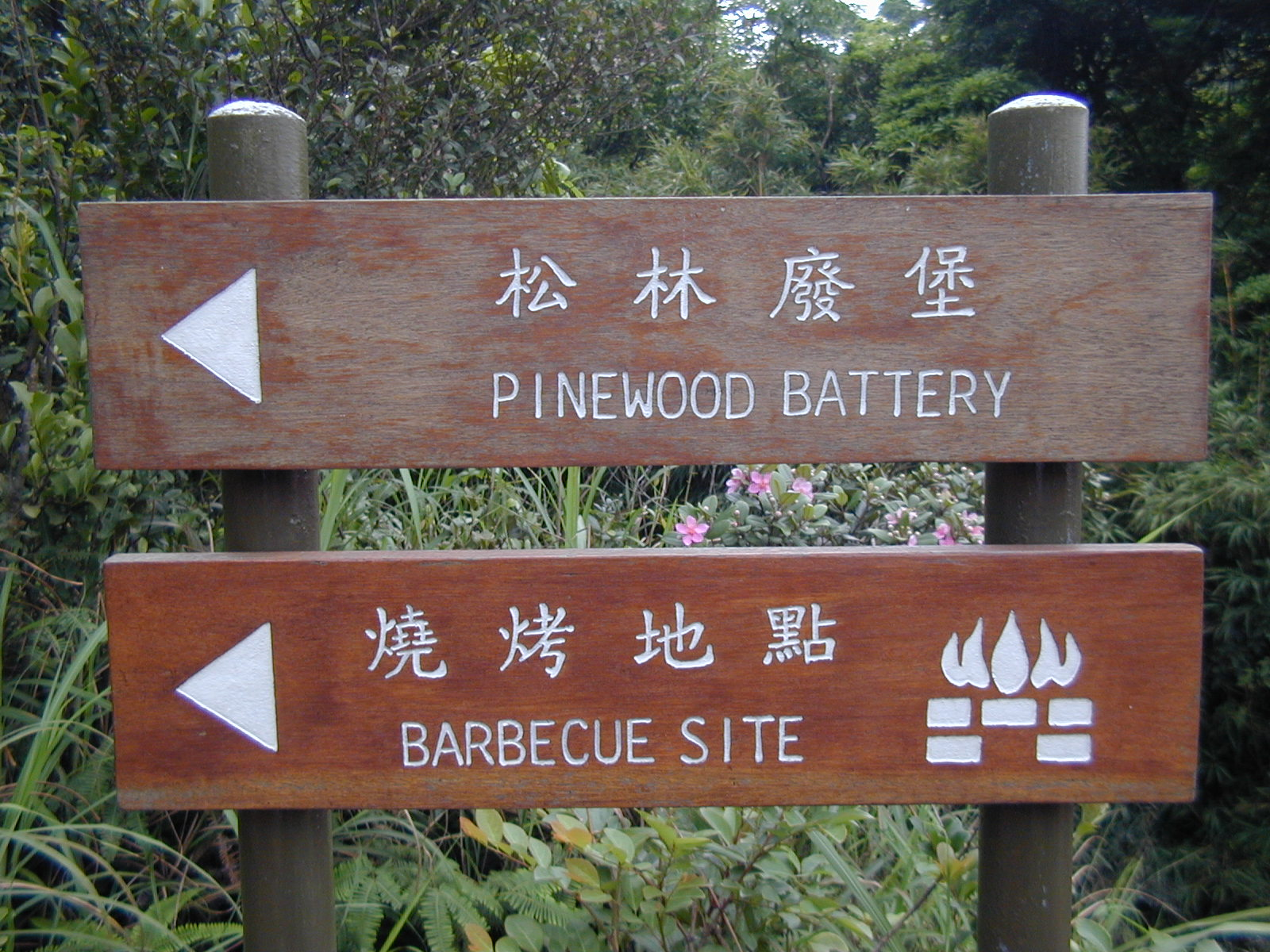
Towards Pinewood Battery

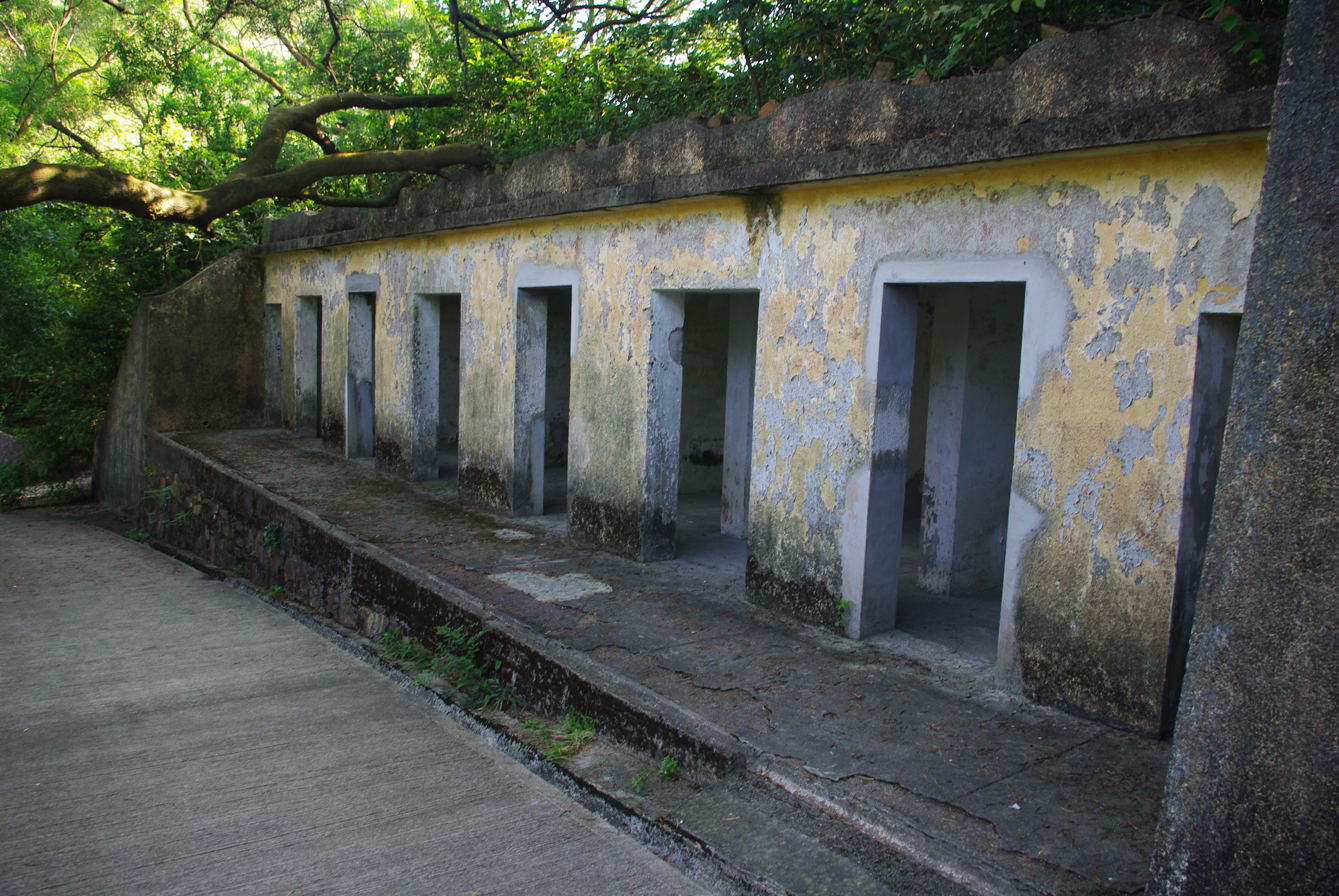
Abandoned buildings

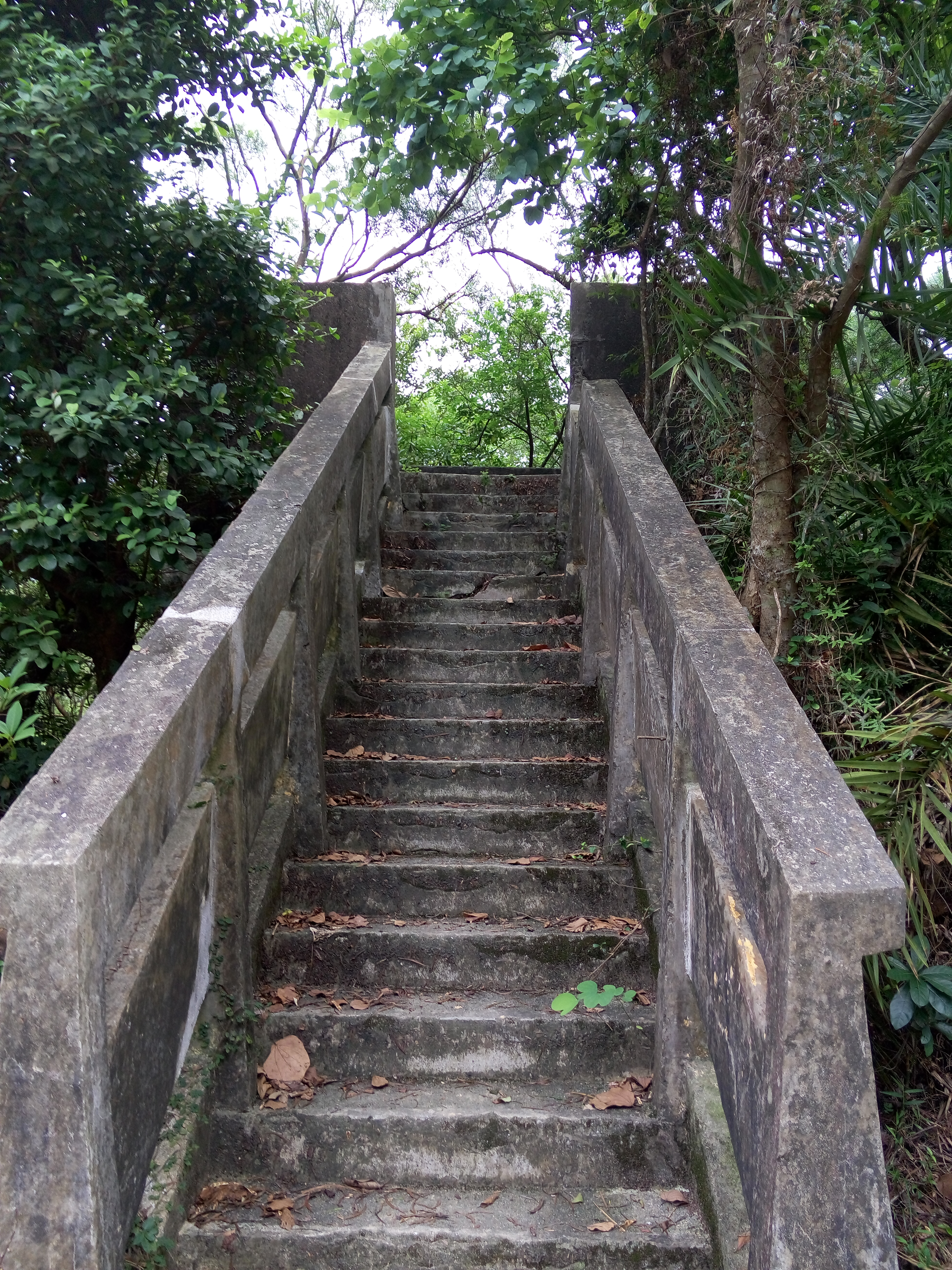
Old staircase

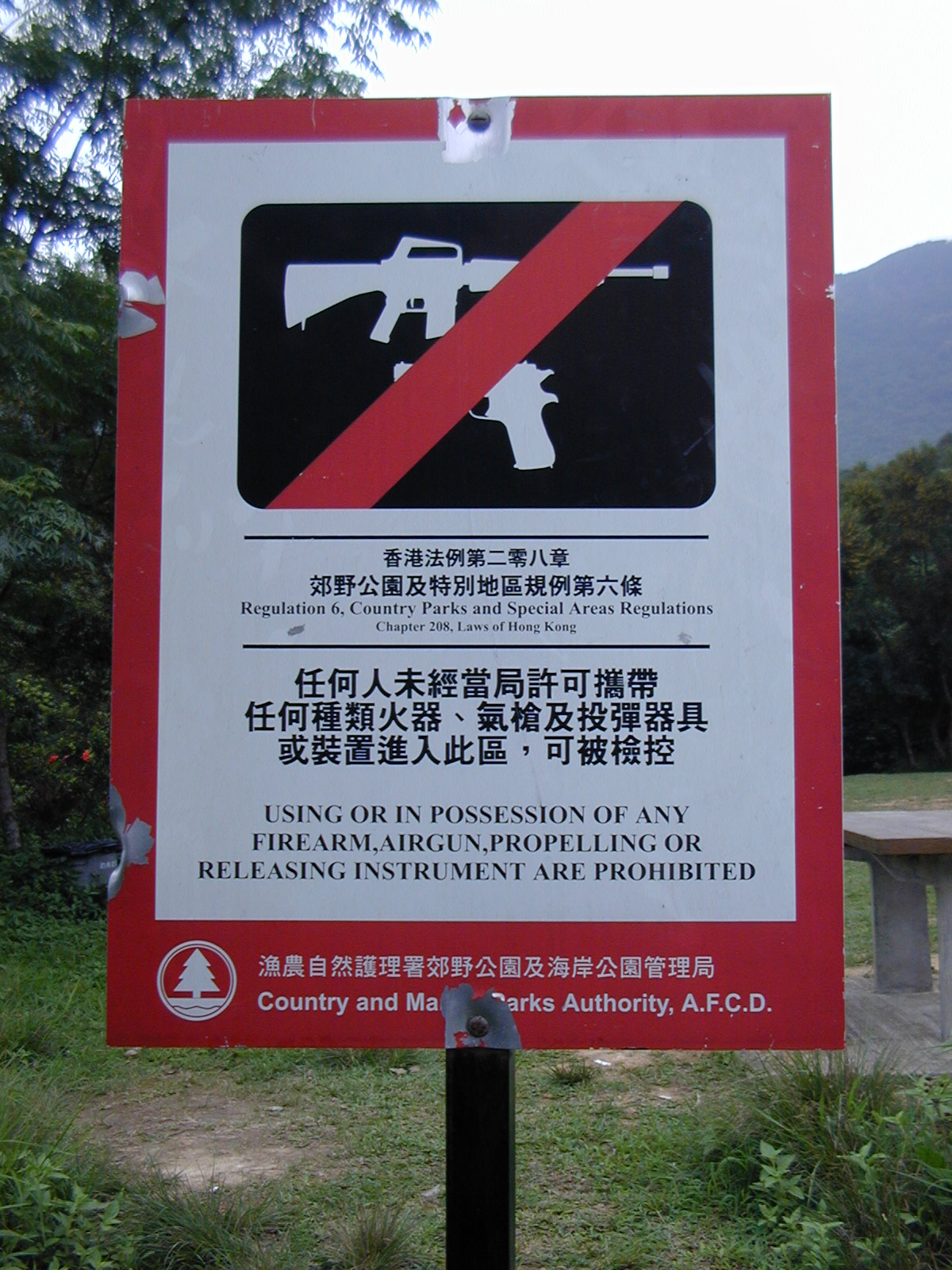
Sign prohibiting wargaming
