= Lung Fu Shan Country Park =

Hong Kong country park

Coordinates: 22.27730°N 114.13571°E

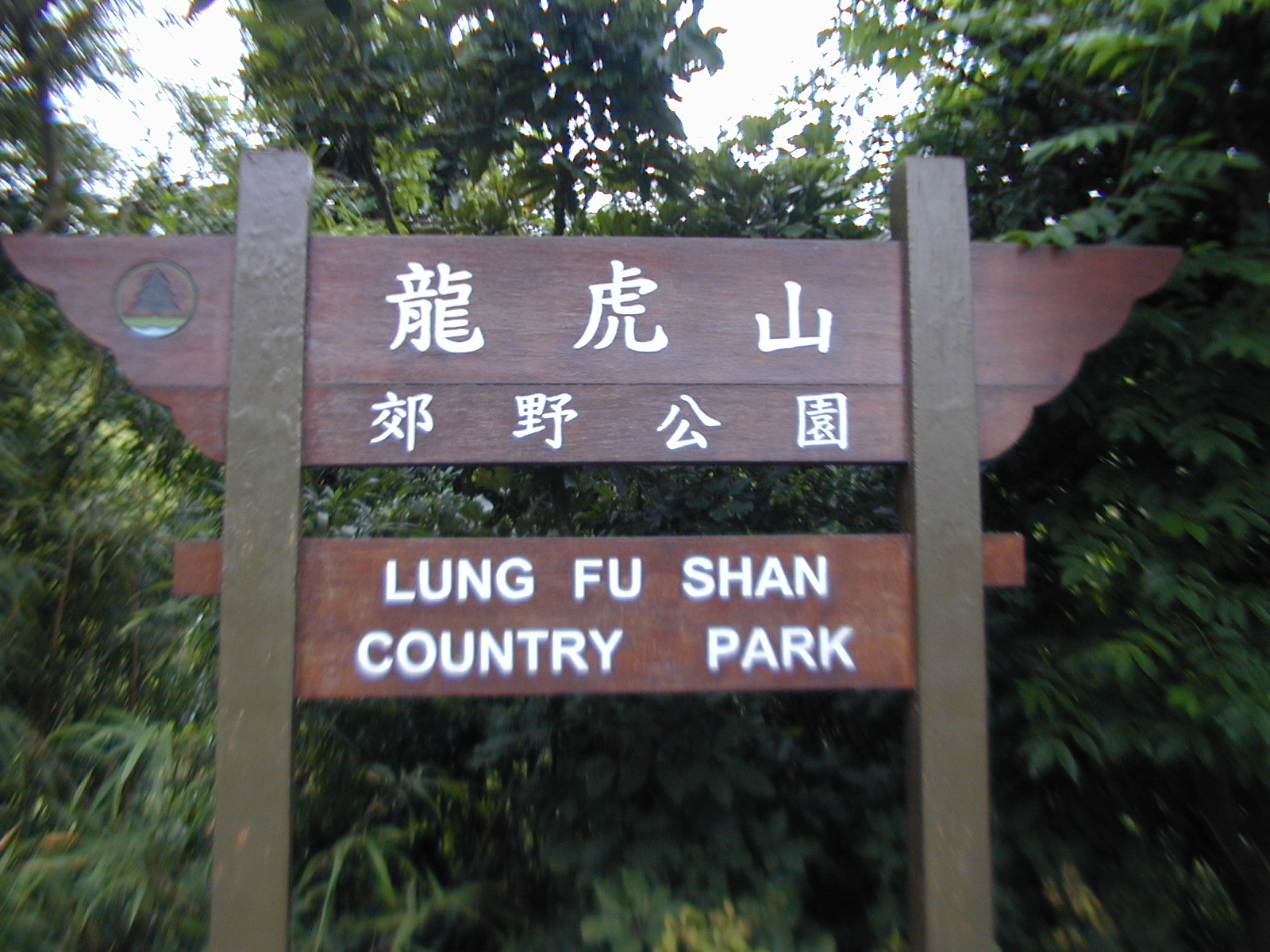
- The welcome sign of Lung Fu Shan Country Park
- Traditional Chinese: 龍虎山郊野公園
- Jyutping: Lung4 fu2 saan1 gaau1 je5 gung1 jyun4*2
- Cantonese Yale: Lùhng fú sāan gāau yéh gūng yùhn
- Hanyu Pinyin: Lónghǔshān Jiāoyě Gōngyuán
Transcriptions
Standard Mandarin
- Hanyu Pinyin: Lónghǔshān Jiāoyě Gōngyuán
Yue: Cantonese
- Yale Romanization: Lùhng fú sāan gāau yéh gūng yùhn
- Jyutping: Lung4 fu2 saan1 gaau1 je5 gung1 jyun4*2

Lung Fu Shan Country Park, established 18 December 1998, is a country park in the Central and Western District of Hong Kong. It covers the densely vegetated slopes of Lung Fu Shan (aka. Hill Above Belcher's), and includes the disused Pinewood Battery as well as the Pinewood Garden picnic area, providing a scenic backdrop to the residential and commercial districts of Hong Kong Island.

In proximity to the Mid-levels and the Western District, Lung Fu Shan is intensively used by members of the public, especially by morning walkers and picnickers. It is situated to the north of Pok Fu Lam Country Park. Towards the east of Lung Fu Shan Country Park is Hatton Road, to the south is Harlech Road whereas to the north and west is a covered conduit constructed by the Waterworks Office. This country park covers an area of about 47 hectares (120 acres), making it the smallest country park in Hong Kong.

== History ==
In 1993, a government planning study (the Territorial Development Strategy Review) identified the area as a potential site for a new country park.

The Country and Marine Parks Authority prepared a draft map of the proposed Lung Fu Shan Country Park, which was published for public inspection on 5 June 1998. In November 1998, the draft map was approved by the chief executive in council. The 47-hectare country park, the 23rd in Hong Kong, was formally designated on 18 December 1998.

== Features ==
=== Lung Fu Shan Environmental Education Centre ===
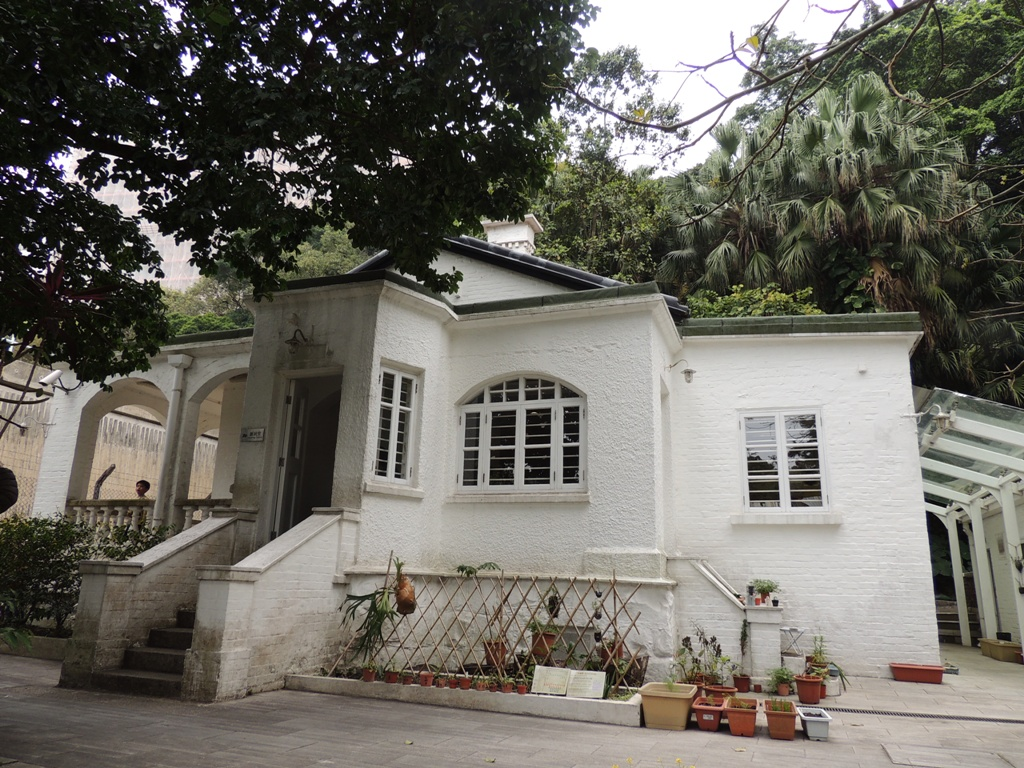
Lung Fu Shan Environmental Education Centre for public awareness of biodiversity.

Situated on Kotewall Road and near University Drive. Established in 2008 by the Hong Kong University and the Environmental Protection Department, the Environmental Education Visitor Centre has been set up to address environmental challenges through collaborative and constructive actions. Its mission is to maintain and take care of nature through education by working together with the University, Government, and the community. Its main goal is to provide accessible education to the community, so that they can grow and become closer to nature

On top of building public awareness and education, the centre is now carrying out Citizen Science projects. Their first BioBlitz was held in 2017, with the 100 participants and volunteers observing 151 species in Lung Fu Shan Country Park with the guidance of 11 experts. In 2018 this was expanded to separate BioBlitz surveys into four animal groups: Birds; Butterflies, (other) Insects, and Amphibians and Reptiles

=== Lung Fu Shan Trail ===
The Lung Fu Shan Fitness Trail is a 2,750-metre (3,010 yd)-long trail on the Peak. Signs on the trail offer information about safe hiking. The trail starts at Pinewood Garden and proceeds through the Pinewood Battery, a few barbecue sites, a number of shelters, a flight of steps, and a stretch of steep road before arriving at the junction of Harlech Road and Hatton Road. It takes about 60 minutes to hike the entire trail.

=== Pinewood Battery ===
Pinewood Battery is a disused military site constructed around 1903, which has been preserved within the country park. The park has interpretive signage illustrating the historical significance of the battery.

Some visitors have illegally used the site for wargaming. To prevent further damage to the battery, the Country and Marine Parks Authority of the Agriculture, Fisheries and Conservation Department (AFCD) erected a warning sign, stating that "using or possession of any firearm, airgun, propelling or releasing instrument are prohibited". However, many plastic BB bullets are still found on the site.

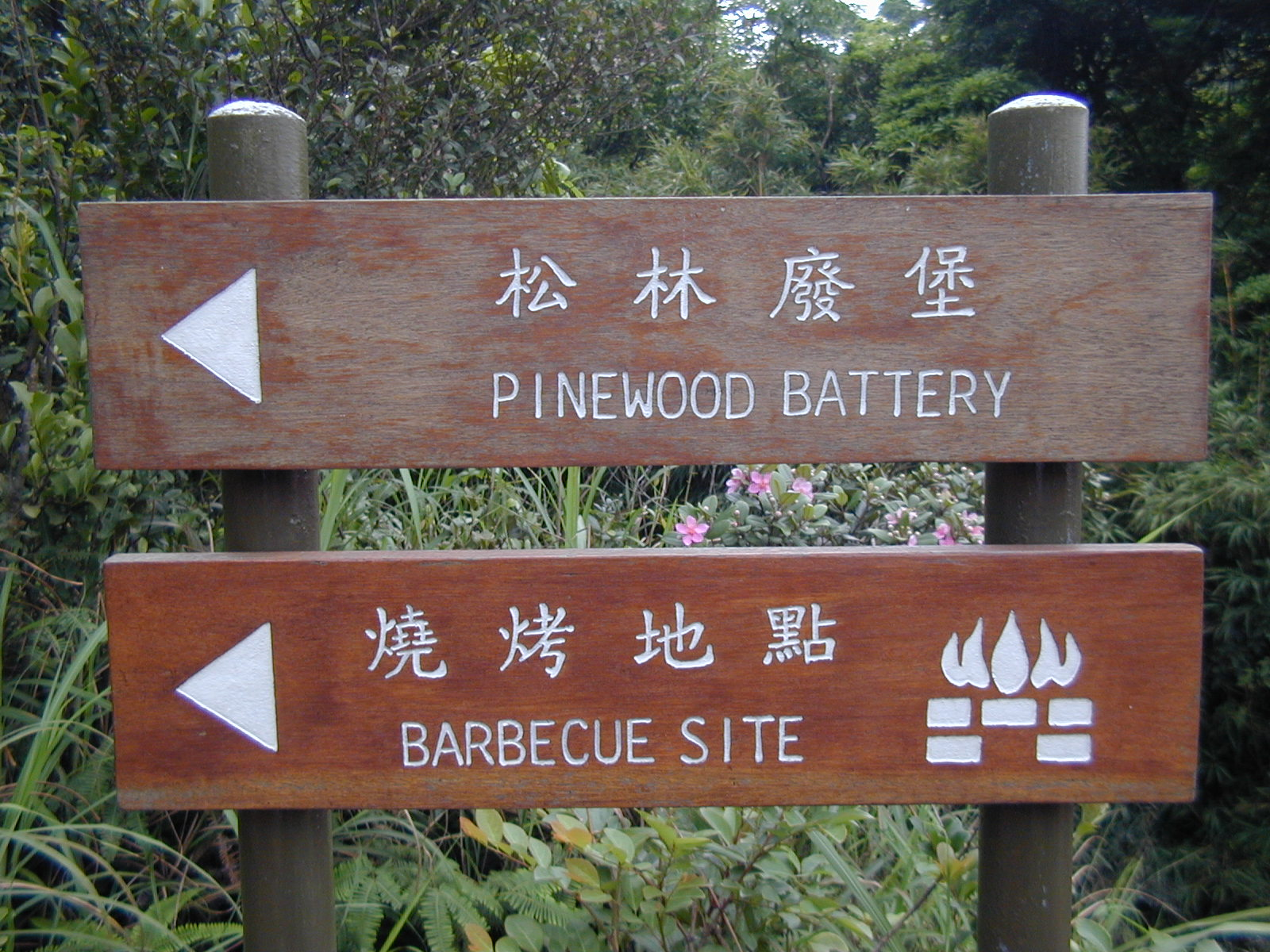
Towards Pinewood Battery

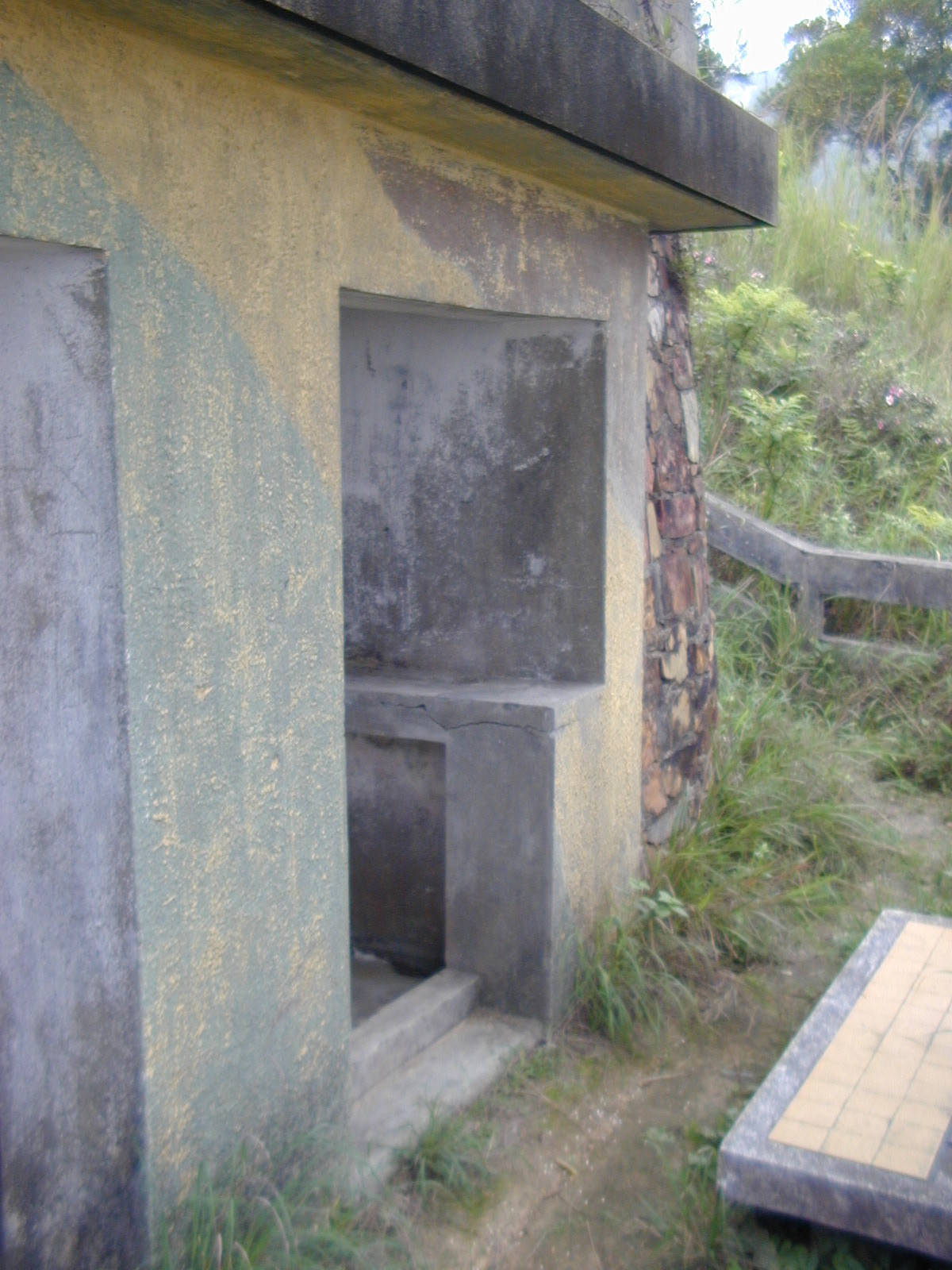
Abandoned buildings

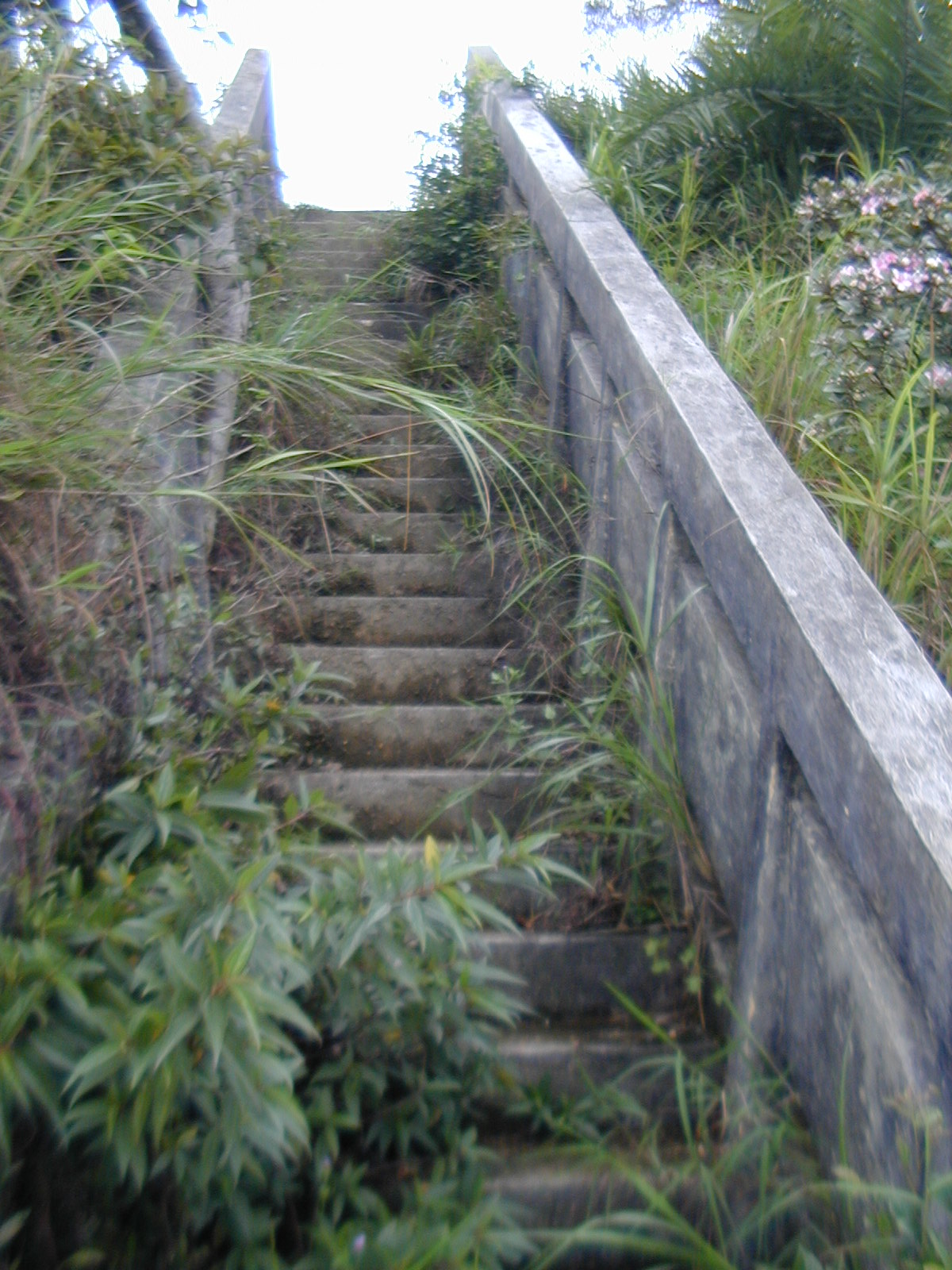
Overgrown staircase

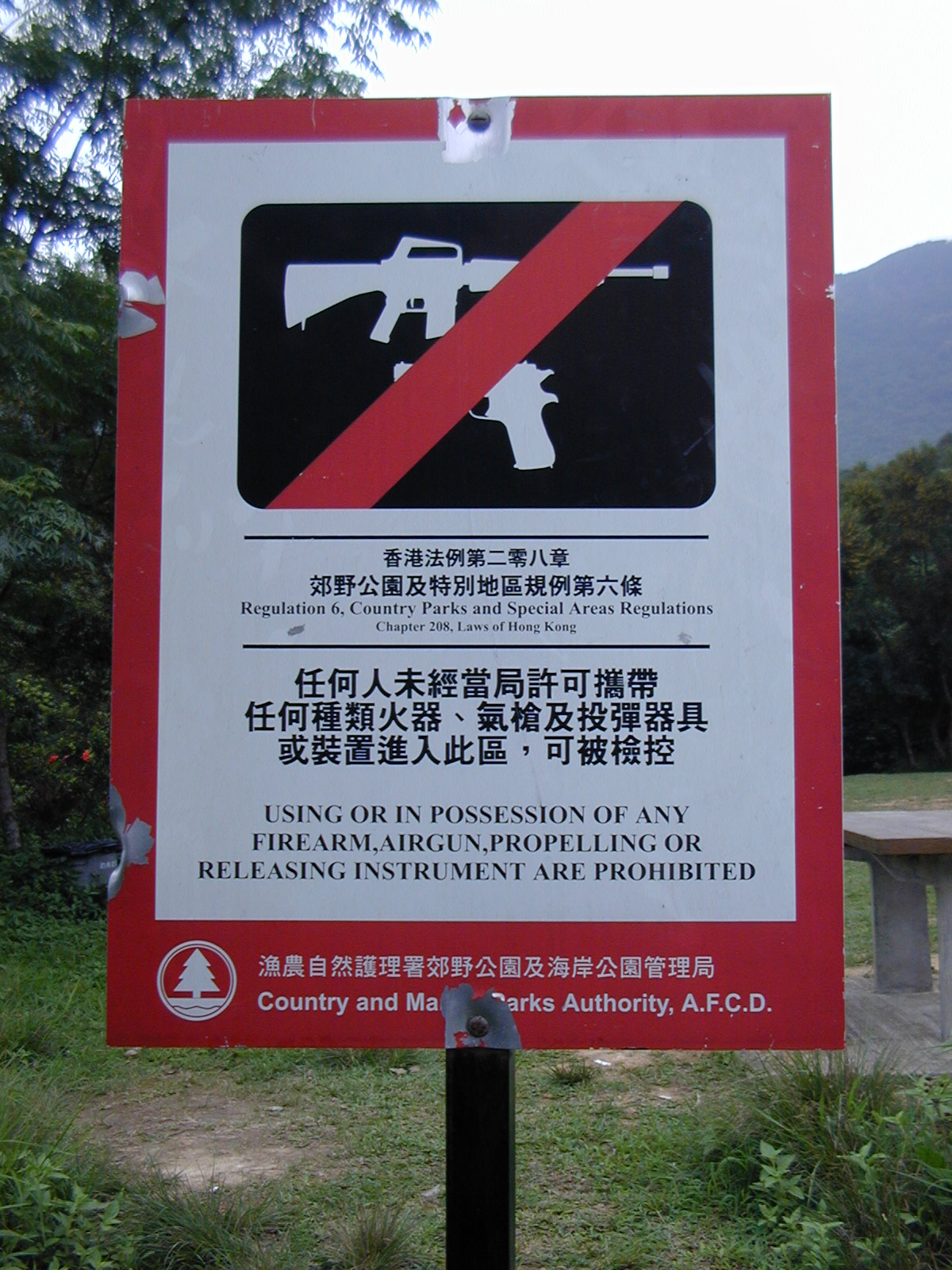
Sign prohibiting wargaming

=== View Compass ===
The View Compass commands an excellent vistas of the western part of the territory and the Victoria Harbour.

== See also ==
- Conservation in Hong Kong
