= Charles Ferguson Smith =

American military officer (1807–1862)

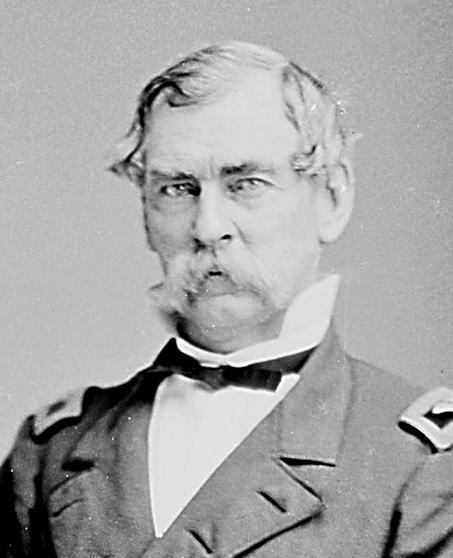
- Born: April 24, 1807; Philadelphia, Pennsylvania, U.S.
- Died: April 25, 1862 (aged 55); Savannah, Tennessee, U.S.
- Burial place: Laurel Hill Cemetery, Philadelphia, Pennsylvania, U.S.
- Military career
- Allegiance: United States of America; Union
- Branch: United States Army; Union Army
- Service years: 1825–1862
- Rank: Major General
- Commands: Department of Utah; 3rd Regular Infantry; 2nd Division, AotT; Army of the Tennessee
- Conflicts: Mexican–American War; Battle of Palo Alto; Battle of Resaca de la Palma; Battle of Monterrey; Siege of Veracruz; Battle of Cerro Gordo; Battle of Contreras; Battle of Churubusco; Battle of Chapultepec; Utah War; American Civil War; Battle of Fort Henry; Battle of Fort Donelson
- Other work: Commandant of Cadets

Charles Ferguson Smith (April 24, 1807 – April 25, 1862) was an American military officer who served in the United States Army during the Mexican–American War and the Utah War. He served as a Union Army major general during the American Civil War.

He served as commandant of cadets of the United States Military Academy from 1838 to 1843. During the American Civil War, he served in the Army of the Tennessee under Ulysses S. Grant, who was a student of his at the military academy. Smith was instrumental in Grant's victory at the Battle of Fort Donelson but died in April 1862 due to infection of a non-combat leg injury and subsequent dysentery.

== Early life and education ==
Smith was born on April 24, 1807, in Philadelphia, Pennsylvania, to Samuel B. Smith and Margaret Ferguson. His paternal grandfather was the Presbyterian church minister John Blair Smith. He graduated from the United States Military Academy in 1825.

== Career ==
He was commissioned second lieutenant and assigned to the 2nd U.S. Artillery at Fort Delaware and then at the Augusta Arsenal from 1827 to 1829. He returned to the military academy in 1829 and served on the faculty as an instructor of tactics under Ethan A. Hitchcock. He was appointed Commandant of Cadets (second in authority to the academy superintendent) and promoted to first lieutenant. He served in that position from 1838 to 1842.

He distinguished himself as an artillery battalion commander in the Mexican–American War and served under both Zachary Taylor and Winfield Scott at the Battle of Palo Alto, the Battle of Resaca de la Palma, the Battle of Monterrey, and the Battle of Churubusco. He received brevet promotions from major through colonel for his service in these battles and at the end of the war was a lieutenant colonel in the Regular Army of the United States. He commanded the police guard in Mexico City from the end of the war to 1848. He was an original member of the Aztec Club of 1847.

He commanded the Red River Expedition (1856) from 1856 to 1857, and served under Albert Sidney Johnston in Utah from 1857 to 1860. He commanded the Army's Department of Utah in the Utah Territory, from 1860 to 1861.

=== American Civil War ===
After the outbreak of the American Civil war, Smith briefly led the Department of Washington at Fort Washington, Maryland, through 1861, and served on recruiting duty in New York City. On August 31, 1861, he was commissioned a brigadier general of volunteers and on September 9, 1861, as colonel of the 3rd Regular U.S. Army Infantry. He was transferred to the Western Theater and given command of the Western District of Kentucky. He served as a division commander in the Department of the Missouri under newly recommissioned Brigadier General Ulysses S. Grant, who had been one of his pupils decades before at West Point. This potentially awkward situation was eased by Smith's loyalty to his young chief.

Smith led his division in the attack on the Confederate right flank at the Battle of Fort Donelson. His units fought until nightfall and pushed back the 30th Tennessee Infantry. His troops held the captured terrain which soon forced the Confederate defenders to surrender. When the Southern forces sent a request to discuss terms of surrender, General Smith was quoted as saying "no terms to the damn rebels", advice that Grant softened to, "No terms except unconditional and immediate surrender can be accepted", which made him known throughout the Northern newspapers as U.S. "Unconditional Surrender" Grant.

When theater commander Major General Henry Halleck, became distrustful and perhaps envious of Grant, he briefly relieved him of field command of the Army's expedition up the Tennessee River, and gave that responsibility to Smith. However, Halleck soon restored Grant to field command (intervention by 16th President Abraham Lincoln may have been a factor). (Note: Many authors see presidential pressure behind Grant's reinstatement to field command. See, e.g., Gott 2003, pp. 267–68; Nevin 1983, p. 96. But there is room to question that conclusion. Halleck relieved Grant of field command of the expedition (but not his overall command) on March 4 (OR I-10-2-3). On March 9 and 10, Halleck advised Grant to prepare himself to take the field. On March 10, the President and Secretary of War inquired about Grant's status, and on March 13, Halleck directed Grant to take the field. See Halleck to Grant, March 9, 10, 13, 1862, OR I-10-2-22, 27, 32; Thomas to Halleck, March 10, 1862, OR I-7-683. This sequence suggests that Halleck may have decided to restore Grant to field command before receiving Lincoln's inquiry. See Smith 2001, p. 176: Halleck's "reinstatement of Grant preceded by one day the bombshell that landed on his desk from the adjutant general [on behalf of the President and Secretary of War] in Washington.")

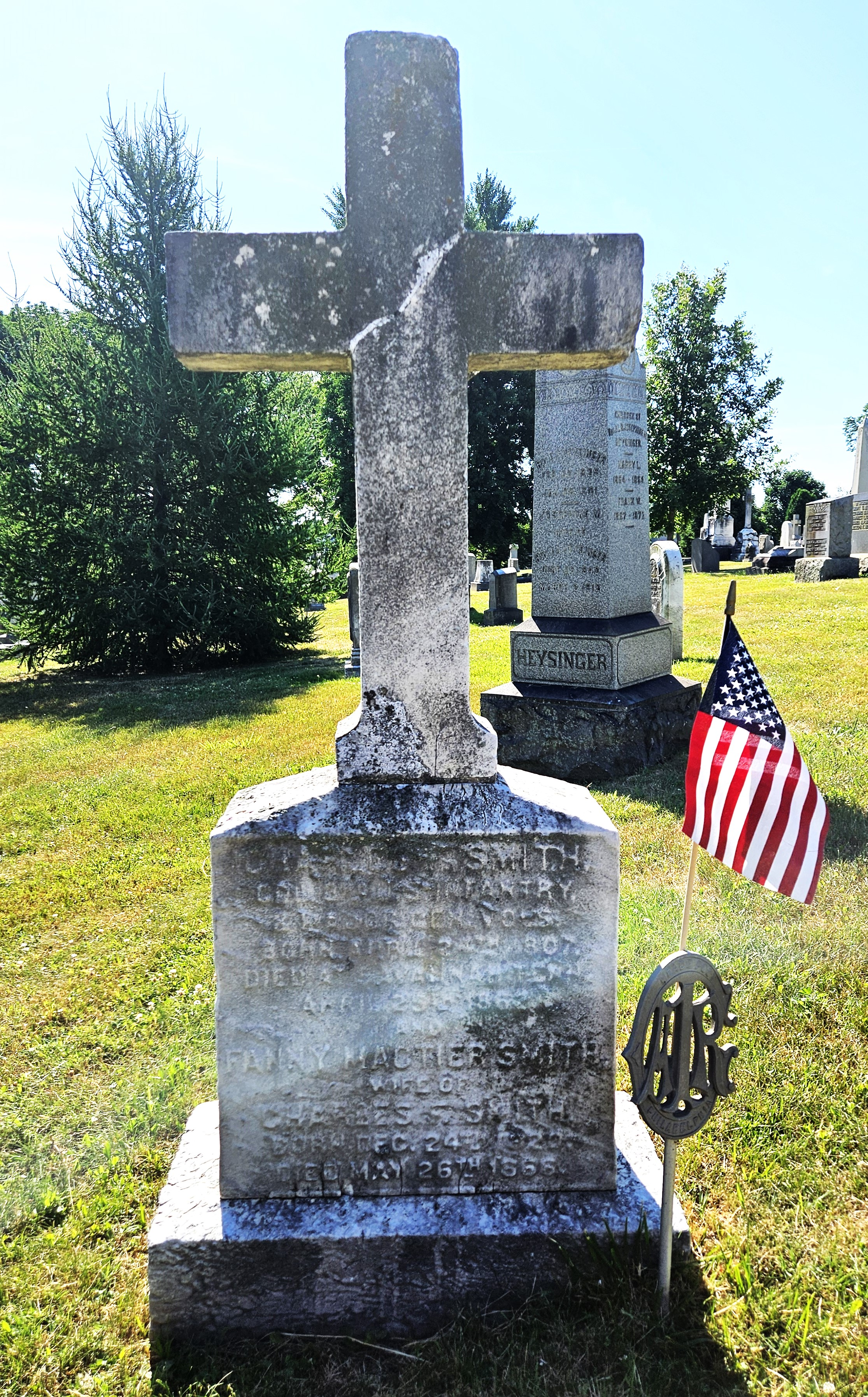
Charles Ferguson Smith's tombstone in Laurel Hill Cemetery, Philadelphia

Smith suffered a serious leg injury while jumping into a rowboat that forced him to miss the Battle of Shiloh, where his experience was sorely missed. Smith died on April 25, 1862, at Savannah, Tennessee, from infection of the leg injury and subsequent dysentery. He was interred in Laurel Hill Cemetery in Philadelphia.

The untimely death of Gen. Smith forced Grant to partner with General William Tecumseh Sherman, and build a partnership with him that would eventually win the war.

== Personal life ==
Smith married Francis Mactier on March 24, 1840.

== Legacy ==
Three forts were named in his honor. The first Fort C. F. Smith was built in 1863 as part of the perimeter defenses of Washington, D.C. during the American Civil War. The second, Fort C.F. Smith, was part of the Civil War defenses of Bowling Green, Kentucky. The third Fort C. F. Smith was built in 1866 at the Bighorn River crossing of the Bozeman Trail in the southern edge of the Montana Territory from 1864 to 1889.

== Dates of rank ==
- Cadet, United States Military Academy - 1 July 1820
- 2nd Lieutenant, 2nd Artillery - 1 July 1825
- 1st Lieutenant, 2nd Artillery - 30 May 1832
- Captain, 2nd Artillery - 7 July 1838
- Brevet Major - 9 May 1846
- Brevet Lieutenant Colonel - 23 September 1846
- Brevet Colonel - 20 August 1847
- Major, 1st Artillery - 25 November 1854
- Lieutenant Colonel, 10th Infantry - 3 March 1855
- Colonel, 3rd Infantry - 9 September 1861
- Brigadier General, Volunteers - 31 August 1861
- Major General, Volunteers - 21 March 1862

== See also ==
- List of American Civil War generals (Union)
