= Army of the Tennessee =

Unit of the Union Army during the American Civil War

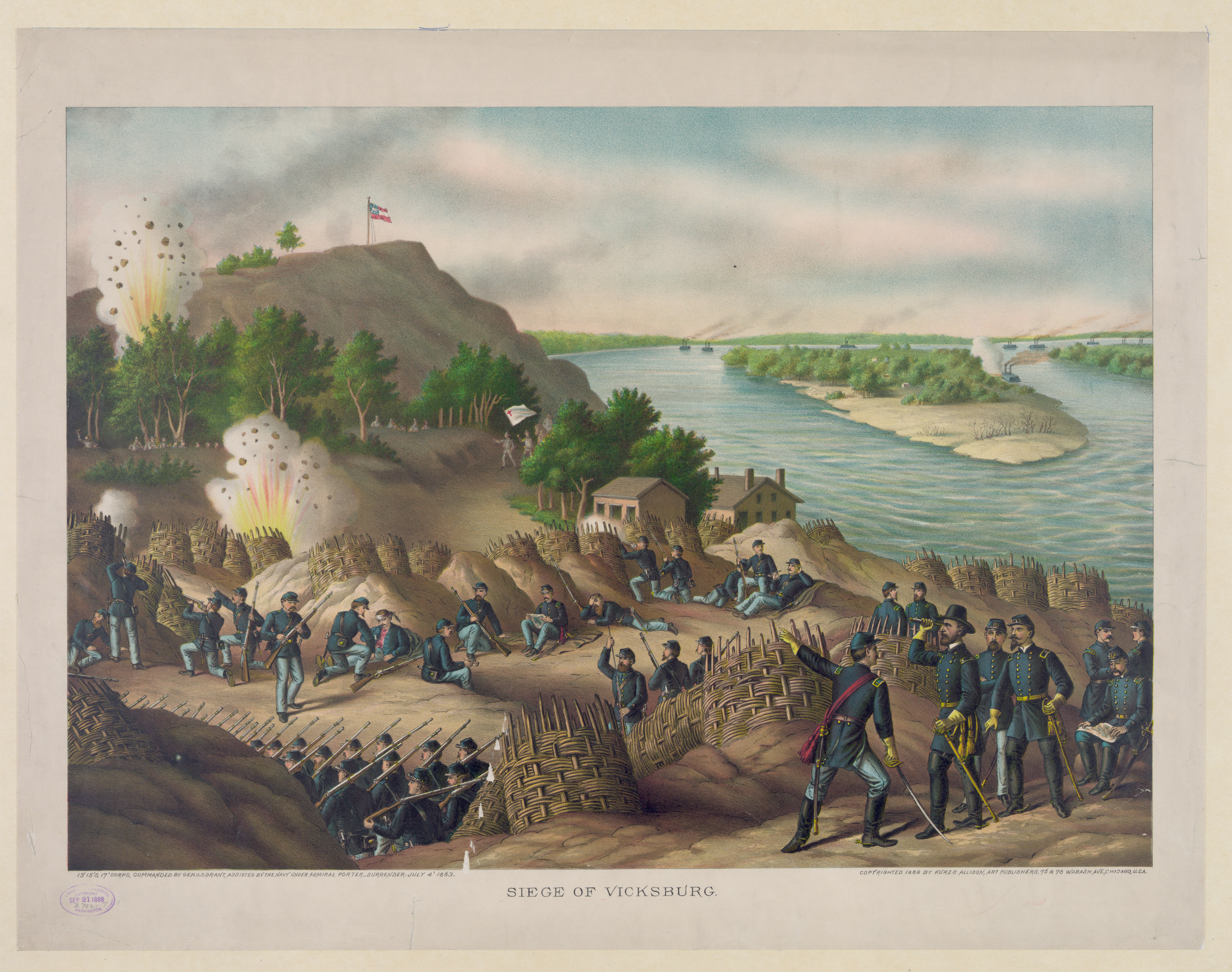
- The Siege of Vicksburg
- Active: 1861–1865
- Country: United States
- Branch: U.S. Army (Union Army)
- Type: Field army
- Part of: District of Cairo (1861–1862); District of West Tennessee (1862); Department of the Tennessee (1862–1863); Military Division of the Mississippi (1863–1865)
- Nickname: "The Whip-lash"
- Engagements: American Civil War: Battle of Belmont; Battle of Fort Henry; Battle of Fort Donelson; Battle of Shiloh; Siege of Corinth (May 1862); Battle of Iuka; Battle of Corinth (October 1862); Vicksburg Campaign; Chattanooga campaign; Relief of Knoxville; Meridian Campaign; Atlanta campaign; March to the Sea; Carolinas campaign

Commanders
- Notable commanders: Ulysses S. Grant; William Tecumseh Sherman; James B. McPherson; Oliver O. Howard; John A. Logan; Joseph Hooker

The Army of the Tennessee was a Union army in the Western Theater of the American Civil War, named for the Tennessee River. A 2005 study of the army states that it "was present at most of the great battles that became turning points of the war—Fort Donelson, Vicksburg, and Atlanta" and "won the decisive battles in the decisive theater of the war."

It appears that the term "Army of the Tennessee" was first used within the Union Army in March 1862, to describe Union forces perhaps more properly described as the "Army of West Tennessee"; these were the troops under the command of Maj. Gen. Ulysses S. Grant in the Union's District of West Tennessee. This article also covers Grant's 1861–1862 commands – the District of Southeast Missouri and the District of Cairo – because the troops Grant led in the Battle of Belmont and the Henry-Donelson campaign during that period became the nucleus of the Army of the Tennessee. In April 1862, Grant's troops survived a severe test in the bloody Battle of Shiloh. Then, during six months marked by discouragement and anxiety for Grant, his army first joined with two other Union armies to prosecute the relatively bloodless Siege of Corinth and then strained to hold Union positions in Tennessee and Mississippi. In October 1862, Grant's command was reconfigured and elevated to departmental status, as the Department of the Tennessee; the title of his command was thus officially aligned with that of his army. Grant commanded these forces until after his critically important victory at Vicksburg on July 4, 1863. Grant was then tasked with command of the Military Division of the Mississippi, overseeing this army and additional Union armies.

Under succeeding generals, starting with William Tecumseh Sherman, the army marched and fought from the Chattanooga campaign, through the Relief of Knoxville, the Meridian Campaign, the Atlanta campaign, the March to the Sea, the Carolinas campaign, and to the end of the war and disbandment. In 1867, apparently speaking of the Atlanta campaign, General Sherman said that the Army of the Tennessee was "never checked—always victorious; so rapid in motion—so eager to strike; it deserved its name of the 'Whip-lash,' swung from one flank to the other, as danger called, night or day, sunshine or storm."

== History ==
History remembers the Army of the Tennessee as one of the most important Union armies during the Civil War, an army intimately associated with the Union's two most celebrated generals, Ulysses S. Grant and William Tecumseh Sherman. It is thus rather ironic that frequent military reorganizations and looseness of usage during the war itself make it difficult to pinpoint the exact date at which this army formally came into existence. It should suffice to note that the "nucleus [of troops] around which was to gather the... Army of the Tennessee" first took shape in 1861–1862, while Grant was headquartered at Cairo, Illinois. Those troops continued under Grant in his next command, the distinct District of West Tennessee; they were then sometimes, and perhaps most appropriately, called the "Army of West Tennessee." However, army correspondence began using the term "Army of the Tennessee" in March 1862; that term soon became commonplace and naturally lived on when Grant's command was elevated to departmental status in October 1862, as the Department of the Tennessee. During the course of the war, elements of the Army of the Tennessee performed many tasks, and the army evolved with the addition and subtraction of many units. It is not feasible to chronicle every such development here, even at the corps level. Rather, this article traces the main thrust of the army's development and its most memorable activities. At any given time, substantial numbers of troops were engaged in activities not discussed here. For example, in April 1863, less than half of Grant's departmental strength was directly engaged in the Vicksburg Campaign.

=== Cairo and the Battle of Belmont ===
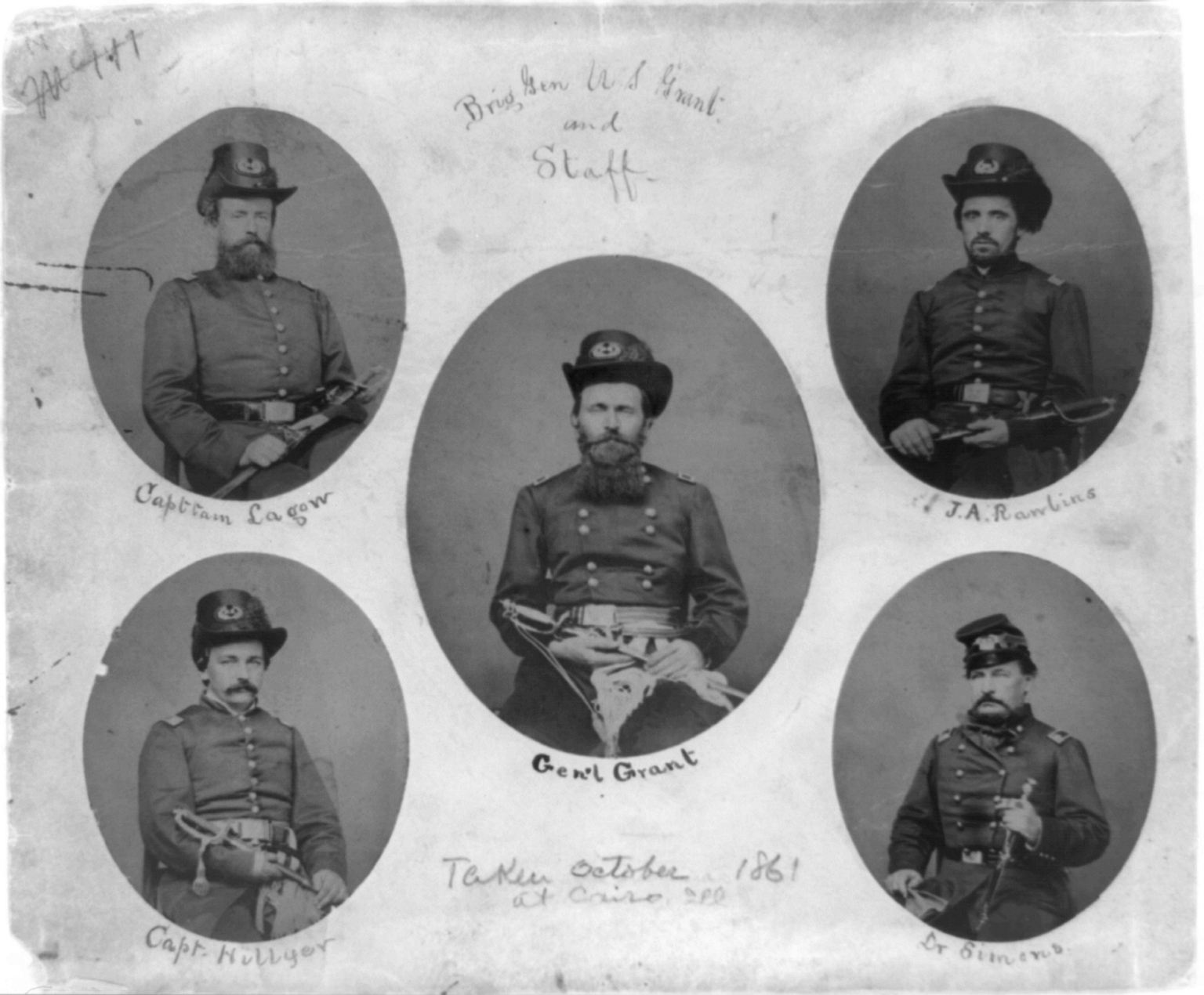
Brigadier General Grant and staff, Cairo, October 1861

In September 1861, Brig. Gen. Ulysses S. Grant, then subordinate to Maj. Gen. John Fremont in the Union's Western Department, assumed command of the District of Southeast Missouri; Grant established his headquarters at the strategic river port of Cairo, Illinois on the border with southeast Missouri and northern Kentucky. One of Grant's wartime aides, John A. Rawlins, later stated that "[f]rom this time... commenced the growth and organization of the Army of the Tennessee." Just days later, prompted by Confederate occupation of Columbus, Kentucky, on the Mississippi River, Grant led a small force to seize Paducah, Kentucky, where the Tennessee River joins the Ohio River; Grant thus forestalled a Confederate effort to occupy the strategically important town. Paducah promptly became a separate Union command under Brig. Gen. Charles F. Smith, who soon occupied Smithland, Kentucky, at the junction of the Cumberland River and the Ohio.

According to Rawlins, the "first affair dignified by the name of a battle" for any of Grant's forces occurred at Fredericktown, Missouri, where some of Grant's troops helped defeat Confederate forces under M. Jeff Thompson. Grant's own first engagement came on November 7 at Belmont, Missouri, a Mississippi River landing opposite Columbus, Kentucky. Grant, accompanied by Brig. Gen. John A. McClernand, moved a force of approximately 3,000 to Belmont by water, cut his way into the Confederate camps there, and then had to fight his way back out to regain his transports. Grant's casualties in this first battle totaled about 500; Confederate casualties were similar. While Grant had suffered a repulse, he won favorable press coverage. This battle, reports Rawlins, "confirmed General Grant in his views" that he should "give battle" whenever "he had what he thought a sufficient number of men." Also in November, John Fremont lost his command at St. Louis, to be replaced by Maj. Gen. Henry W. Halleck, whose command was designated the Department of the Missouri.

=== Henry-Donelson Campaign ===
On December 20, Grant's command was reconfigured to include C.F. Smith's and renamed the District of Cairo (also headquartered at Cairo, Illinois). From that perch, in February 1862, Grant led the Union campaign against Fort Henry, on the Tennessee River, and Fort Donelson, on the Cumberland River. His troops for this campaign eventually numbered approximately 27,000 men, divided into three divisions commanded, respectively, by John McClernand (1st Division), C.F. Smith (2nd), and Brig. Gen. Lewis Wallace (3rd).

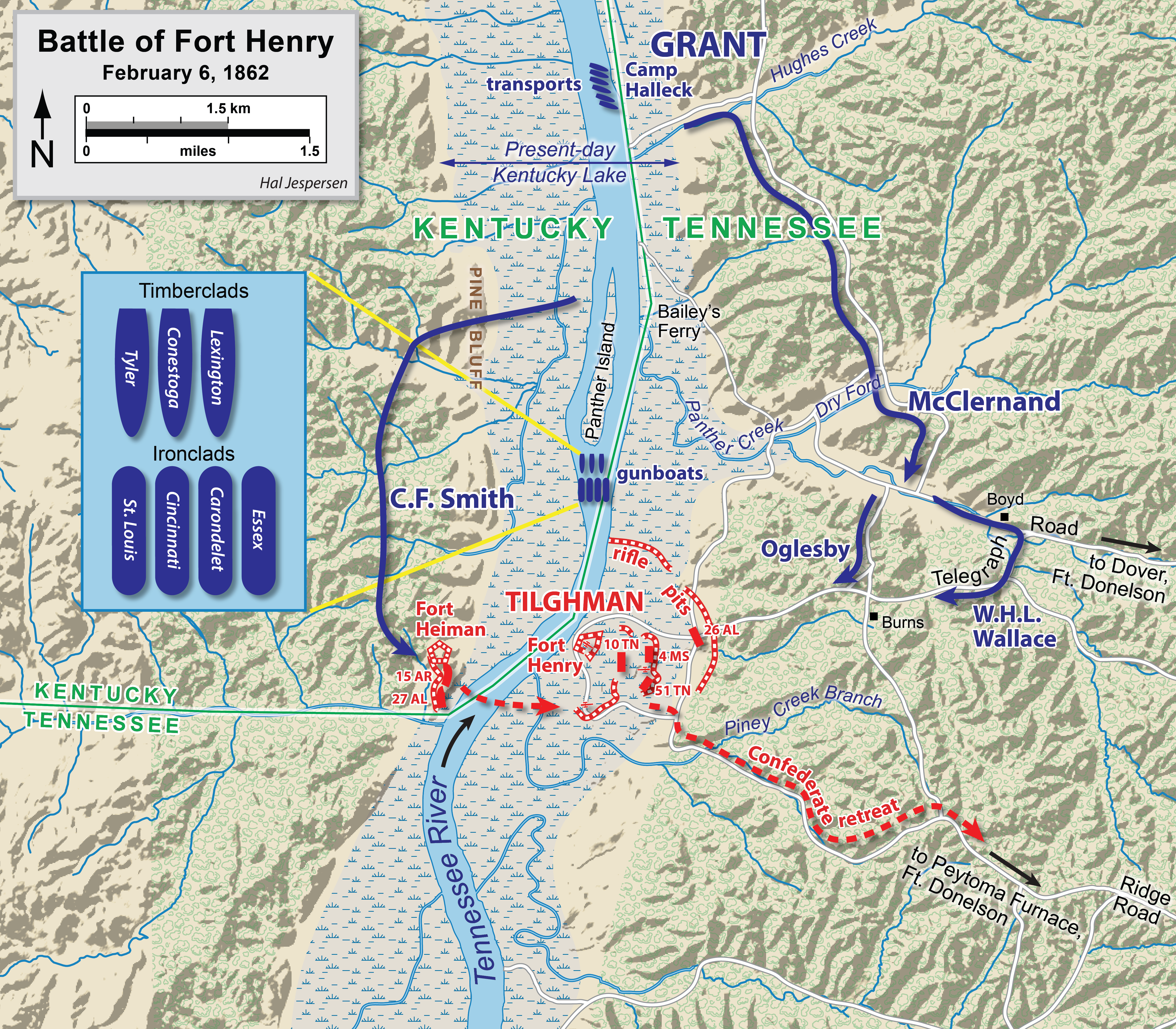
Battle of Fort Henry Confederate Union

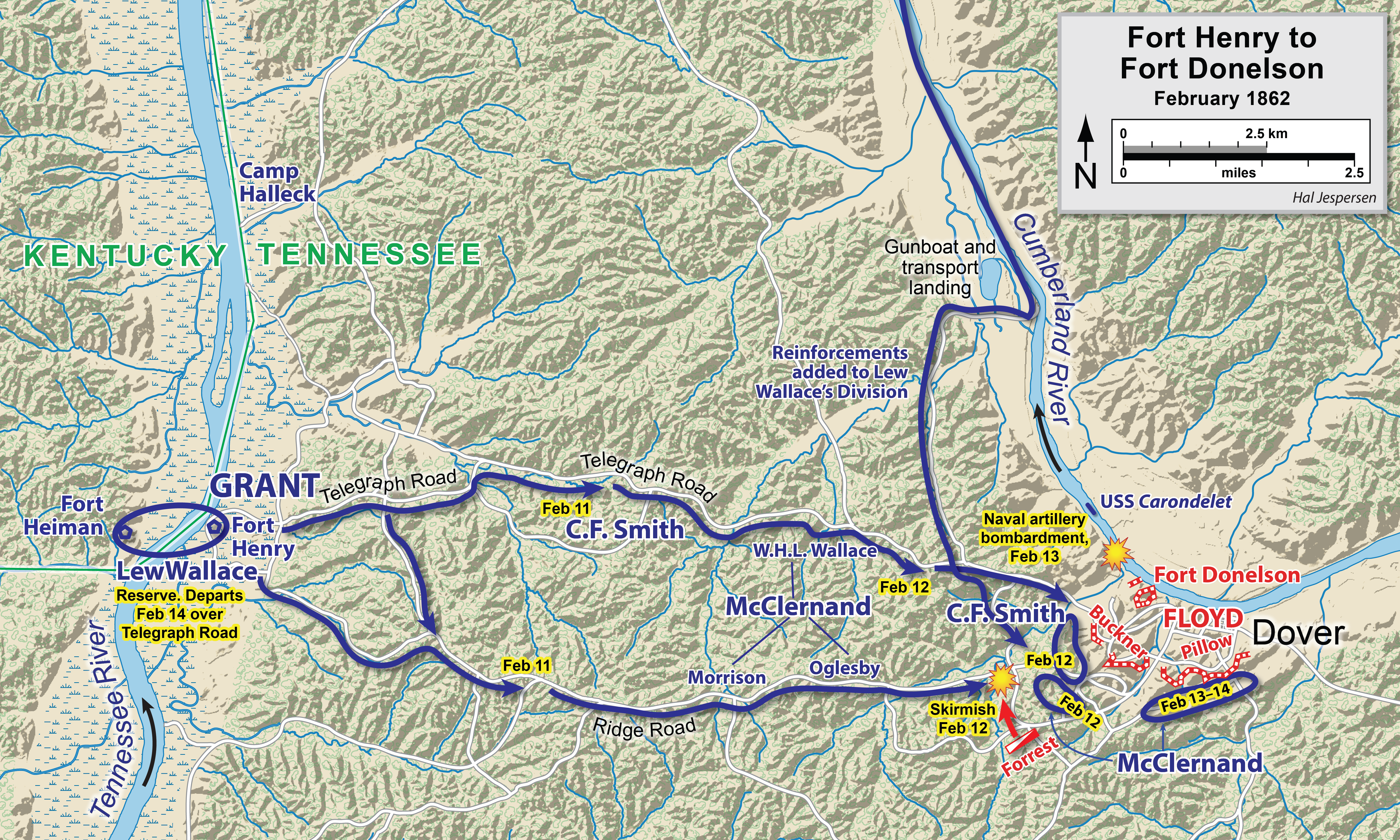
Movement from Fort Henry to Fort Donelson.

Grant initially moved up the Tennessee River (southward) to Fort Henry with only two divisions, McClernand's and Smith's. On February 6, even before he could organize his force for attack, the fort surrendered to U.S. Navy Flag Officer Andrew H. Foote, commander of the Western Flotilla. Several days later, in winter conditions, most of Grant's two divisions marched overland to attack the more formidable Fort Donelson, situated on the Cumberland River but only twelve miles (19 km) away from Fort Henry. Additional Union regiments arrived at Fort Donelson by water; these were formed into the new 3rd Division under Lew Wallace. The Battle of Fort Donelson began on February 13 and, after sharp fighting, concluded on February 16 with the unconditional surrender of the remaining Confederate garrison of approximately 15,000.

Although it would still be a month before the term "Army of the Tennessee" came into use, the three divisions that served under Grant in the Henry-Donelson campaign were the nucleus of that famous army and had now won an important victory that foreshadowed its later successes. One historian describes their accomplishments in the Henry-Donelson campaign as the "first significant Union triumph in the war"; its fruits included breaking the Confederacy's western line of defense, securing Kentucky to the Union, and opening the South, especially Tennessee, to invasion. Another historian notes that Grant's troops "had performed prodigies of valor and endurance during the campaign" and had learned from it that "hard fighting would bring success." As a result of the campaign's conspicuous success, Grant, McClernand, Smith, and Wallace were all promoted to the rank of major general of volunteers. Grant in particular became a national celebrity—"Unconditional Surrender" Grant—for his refusal to allow any other terms of surrender.

=== Shiloh and the Siege of Corinth ===
On February 14, 1862, during the Donelson campaign, Grant was given command of the newly created District of West Tennessee; it appears that his troops soon came to be called the "Army of the Tennessee" more often than the "Army of West Tennessee." Over the next several months, Grant twice was in danger of losing his command, a development that doubtless would have changed the future course and character of the army and perhaps deprived it at this early stage of one source of its future success—continuity of leadership.

In early March, Grant's superior, Maj. Gen. Henry W. Halleck, then in command of the Department of the Missouri, assigned Grant to lead an expedition up the Tennessee River from the recently captured Fort Henry. On March 4, however, Halleck ordered Grant to give field command of the expedition to C.F. Smith; this order has been variously attributed to professional jealousy and to Halleck's lacking confidence in Grant due to certain administrative difficulties. Smith initially established the expedition at Savannah, Tennessee, a town on the east side of the river approximately 100 river miles (160 km) south of Fort Henry. He soon began staging troops at a point—Pittsburg Landing—nine miles (14 km) further south and across the river. Meanwhile, Halleck's command was enlarged and renamed the Department of the Mississippi, and Halleck restored Grant to field command, perhaps because of personal intervention by President Abraham Lincoln. Grant joined his army in the field on March 17. By early April, Grant's army had grown to a total of roughly 50,000 men, organized into six divisions. The three new divisions were commanded by Brig. Gen. Stephen A. Hurlbut (4th Division), Brig. Gen. William Tecumseh Sherman (5th), and Brig. Gen. Benjamin M. Prentiss (6th). In addition, Brig. Gen. W.H.L. Wallace took command of Smith's 2nd Division due to the latter's having suffered a debilitating leg injury.

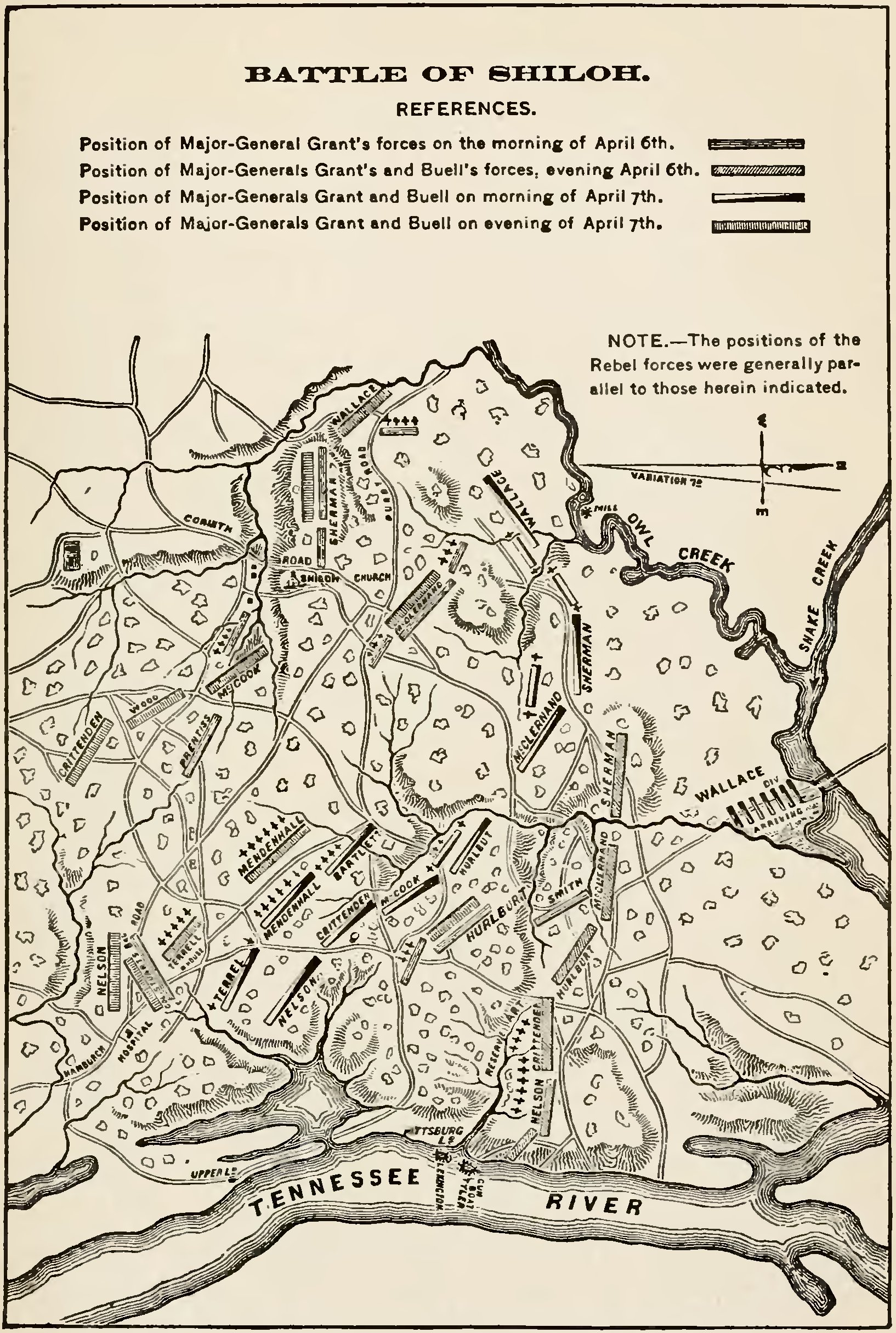
Shiloh: Crucible of the Army of the Tennessee

On April 6–7, Grant's forces fought the bloodiest battle of the Civil War to that time, the Battle of Shiloh, when Confederate forces advanced largely undetected from Corinth, Mississippi, and attacked the five Union divisions staged at Pittsburg Landing. On the first day of the battle, the surprised and unentrenched army fought desperately and suffered many casualties. However, long-expected elements of the Army of the Ohio, under Maj. Gen. Don Carlos Buell, arrived to reinforce Grant late that day, with many more troops arriving overnight and the following day. Grant was also bolstered by the evening arrival of his own 3rd Division; Lew Wallace and his troops had been slow arriving at Pittsburg Landing from their separate position at Crump's Landing. Substantially reinforced by Buell and Wallace, Grant counterattacked the Confederate forces on April 7 and drove them from the field and back toward Corinth. "Grant's victory at Shiloh," one historian has written, "bloody and bitter though it was, doomed the Confederate cause in the Mississippi valley." In the near term, however, the battle resulted in much criticism against Grant for lack of preparedness, swift promotion to major general of volunteers for Sherman, capture for Prentiss, a fatal wound for W.H.L. Wallace, and Grant's loss of confidence in Lew Wallace. In addition, C.F. Smith died later in April from complications due to his non-combat leg injury.

In the aftermath of Shiloh came the second threat to Grant's leadership, as well as a preview of the multi-army operations that would feature prominently in the future of the Army of the Tennessee. Pursuant to previous plans, Grant's departmental superior, General Halleck, arrived at Pittsburg Landing to take command in the field. Intending to move against the Confederate forces concentrating at the rail hub at Corinth, Halleck proceeded to gather and organize what was in effect an army group of over 100,000 men. His force included Grant's Army of the Tennessee, Buell's Army of the Ohio, and Maj. Gen. John Pope's Army of the Mississippi. On April 30, Halleck divided this force into three corps (or "wings") and a reserve. The left wing was commanded by Pope, the center by Buell, the right wing by Maj. Gen. George H. Thomas, and the reserve by John McClernand. Grant's 1st and 3rd Divisions constituted the reserve; the right wing contained Grant's 2nd, 4th, 5th, and 6th Divisions and Thomas's division from the Army of the Ohio. In other words, Halleck had drawn Thomas from division command in the Army of the Ohio and assigned to him, as commander of the right wing, most of Grant's troops.

Halleck assigned Grant to be second-in-command of the entire 100,000-man force, but also expressly confirmed Grant in command of the "Army Corps of the Tennessee" (the right wing and the reserve). It is unclear exactly why Halleck took these actions affecting Grant. However, Grant was under severe public criticism about Shiloh at the time and soon complained that his second-in-command position constituted a "sensure" and was akin to an arrest; among his complaints was the fact that Halleck gave orders directly to Thomas and division commanders nominally subordinate to Grant. With this awkward command structure, embarrassing to Grant, Halleck's forces took the entire month of May, with constant entrenchments, to advance the twenty miles [32 km] to Corinth. This Siege of Corinth culminated with the Confederate forces abandoning the town on the night of May 29–30. Grant later suggested that Halleck failed to accomplish all that he should have in this campaign and its aftermath. However, William Tecumseh Sherman, commanding a division in Thomas's right wing, considered the campaign to be an important period of training for Halleck's forces, including the Army of the Tennessee: "[I]t served for the instruction of our men in guard and picket duty, and in habituating them to out-door life; and by the time we had reached Corinth I believe that army was the best then on this continent."

After Corinth was taken, Grant might have left his command in frustration, but Sherman intervened and encouraged him to remain. Grant's experiences during this period have been cited as one reason for his subsequent warm relations with Sherman and his cooler relations with George Thomas. In turn, the trust between Grant and Sherman contributed importantly to the future effectiveness of the Army of the Tennessee. More immediately, however, Halleck soon rescinded the multi-corps organization adopted for the Corinth campaign and began to disperse his large force. On June 10, Halleck restored Grant to straightforward command of the "Army of the Tennessee"; Buell was dispatched toward Chattanooga, Tennessee; and, by incremental stages, George Thomas and his division were detached from the Army of the Tennessee and returned to service with Buell's army. While departmental commander Halleck remained at Corinth, Grant established his headquarters for the District of West Tennessee at newly occupied Memphis, Tennessee, with "his troops strung out across half a dozen railheads along the Mississippi-Tennessee border." Thus, having survived threats to his leadership both before and after Shiloh, Grant remained in position to "buil[d] the Army of the Tennessee in his [own image]," to reflect "his matter-of-fact steadiness and his hard-driving aggressiveness."

=== Iuka and the Battle of Corinth ===
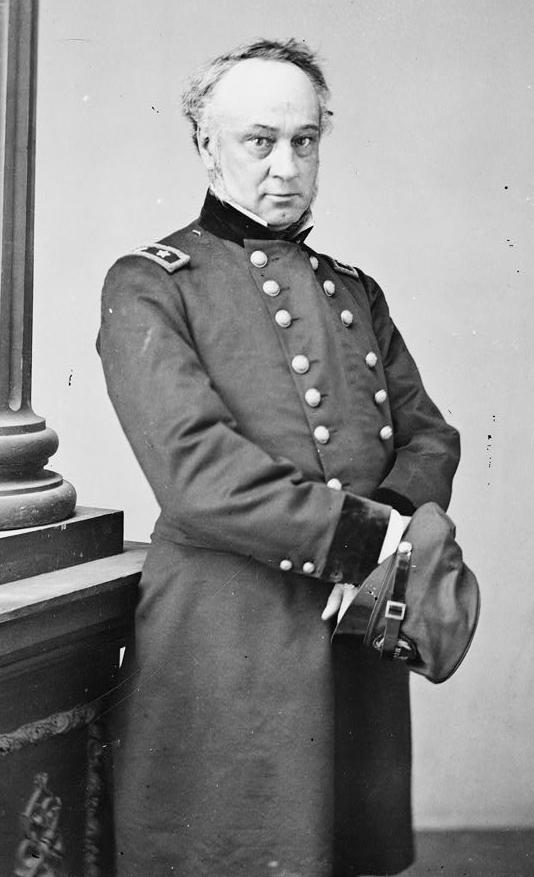
General Henry Wager Halleck

In July 1862, Lincoln summoned Henry Halleck to Washington to serve as general-in-chief; Halleck was not replaced as departmental commander, leading by September to the demise of the geographically broad Department of the Mississippi. One immediate result was that, on July 16, Halleck enlarged Grant's District of West Tennessee and included within it portions of Alabama and Mississippi, as well as the Army of the Mississippi, five divisions then under the command of Maj. Gen. William S. Rosecrans. Grant relocated his headquarters to Corinth (and later Jackson, Tennessee) to oversee his expanded responsibilities. He soon lost four divisions from this expanded command—that of George Thomas and three from Rosecrans's Army of the Mississippi—to Buell's Army of the Ohio; these losses shrank Grant's forces from approximately 80,000 men to less than 50,000. This threw Grant on the "defensive," simply trying to deploy his remaining forces to protect his own positions against threatening Confederate forces; Grant later described this as his "most anxious period of the war." It came to an end with victories led by General Rosecrans in the September Battle of Iuka and the more consequential October Battle of Corinth. Grant was nearby and coordinating with Rosecrans, but not on the field, for these two battles; Rosecrans fought Iuka with elements of his shrunken Army of the Mississippi, and Corinth with the addition of two divisions from the Army of the Tennessee. The victory at Corinth was sufficiently clear cut to relieve Grant "from any further anxiety for the safety of the territory within my jurisdiction."

Soon thereafter, on October 16, Grant's geographical command was redefined and elevated to departmental status, becoming the Department of the Tennessee. This made the term "Army of the Tennessee" more official for his troops. Also in October, Don Carlos Buell lost command of the Army of the Ohio; his place went to Rosecrans, whose commands were christened the Department and the Army of the Cumberland. By an order dated December 18, but not fully implemented until somewhat later, Grant's Army of the Tennessee was organized into four corps—the XIII under John McClernand, the XV under W.T. Sherman, the XVI under Stephen A. Hurlbut, and the XVII under Maj. Gen. James B. McPherson. Each corps contained several divisions and detachments of artillery and cavalry. For illustrative purposes, the reported organization and strength of the Army of the Tennessee as of April 30, 1863, when it numbered approximately 150,000 in total, can be seen in the Official Records.

=== Vicksburg Campaign ===
In the fall of 1862, Grant began organizing operations against Vicksburg, Mississippi, a Confederate strong point on the east bank of the Mississippi River under the command of Lt. Gen. John C. Pemberton. Grant's first initiative ended unsuccessfully in December, when Confederate attacks on his supply lines, especially the supply depot at Holly Springs, Mississippi, caused Grant to abandon his own planned overland move on Vicksburg from the east. Sherman, intended to be operating against Vicksburg down the Mississippi River in concert with Grant's abandoned thrust, then suffered a repulse in the Battle of Chickasaw Bayou. Meanwhile, initially unbeknownst to Grant, his senior subordinate, John McClernand, had used his political influence with Abraham Lincoln to obtain authority for an expedition of his own against Vicksburg. This development, which one historian has characterized as "one of the more bizarre episodes of the Civil War," set McClernand up as a potential competitor to Grant, but also benefited the Army of the Tennessee in the long run because McClernand raised new troops in the Midwest to further his own purposes. In January 1863, shortly after Chickasaw Bayou, McClernand asserted control over the 30,000 men then under Sherman and redesignated those troops as the Army of the Mississippi; that force, under McClernand and Sherman, succeeded in capturing Fort Hindman on the Arkansas River. Grant considered this objective to constitute "a wild-goose chase," and General-in-Chief Halleck authorized him to assume control over all Vicksburg operations. Hence, McClernand's briefly independent force was reincorporated into the Army of the Tennessee, and McClernand's further participation in the Vicksburg campaign was as XIII Corps commander under Grant.

Grant's Operations against Vicksburg

In the early months of 1863, Grant pursued various futile operations seeking to capture Vicksburg from the north, causing one newspaper to complain that the "army was being ruined in mud-turtle expeditions, under the leadership of a drunkard [Grant], whose confidential adviser [Sherman] was a lunatic." However, in April Grant proceeded to establish his troops well south of Vicksburg by marching them down the west side of the Mississippi and crossing it with the aid of the Navy. Working well with the Western Flotilla under Acting Rear Admiral David D. Porter, Grant led approximately 40,000 men in the XIII (McClernand), XV (Sherman), and XVII (McPherson) Corps through the Vicksburg Campaign, a masterful 180-mile (288 km) campaign of maneuver against two Confederate armies, Pemberton's Vicksburg force and a relief force under General Joseph E. Johnston. After capturing and briefly occupying Jackson, Mississippi, on May 14, and winning the Battle of Champion Hill on May 16, Grant failed in initial assaults against the Confederate entrenchments at Vicksburg on May 19 and 22 and then settled in for siege operations rather than incur additional casualties.

During the siege, the army received significant reinforcements, from within and without the Department of the Tennessee, bringing Grant's total strength at Vicksburg above 70,000 soldiers out of a reported July 1863 total strength for the department of approximately 175,000.

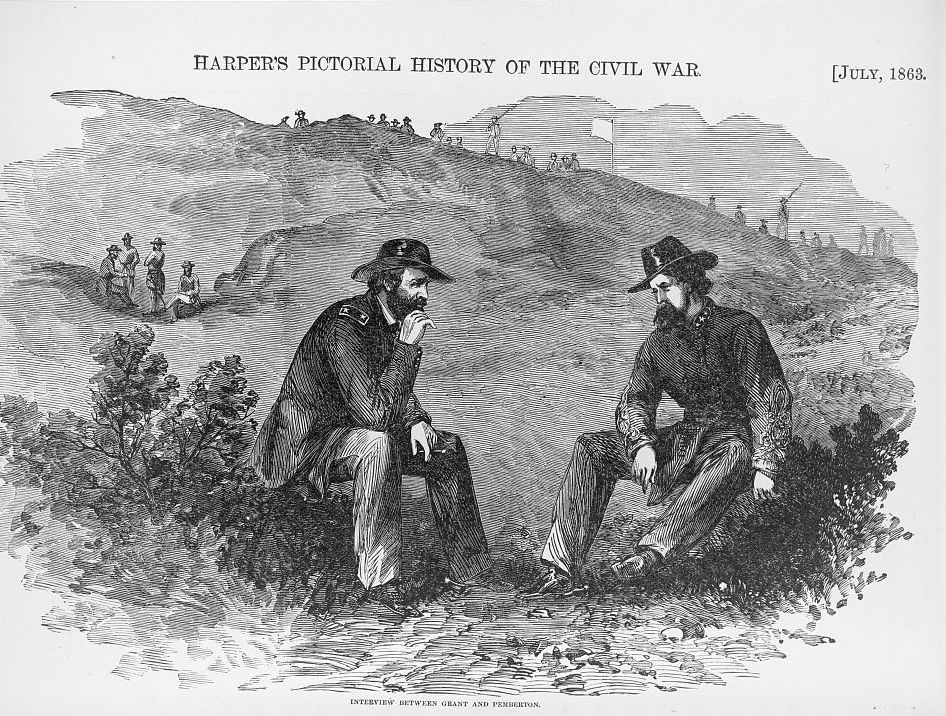
Grant discussing the terms of the capitulation of Vicksburg with defeated Confederate General Pemberton

These reinforcements included troops from Hurlbut's XVI Corps, a "strong division" from the late Army of the Frontier under Maj. Gen. Francis J. Herron, and the IX Corps, 8,000 men from Ambrose Burnside's Army of the Ohio under the command of Maj. Gen. John G. Parke. On June 18, essentially on grounds of insubordination, Grant replaced the ever-political McClernand in command of the XIII Corps with Maj. Gen. Edward O.C. Ord. The city ultimately surrendered on July 4; its garrison of 30,000 was given parole (rather than taken prisoner). Even before Vicksburg fell, reflecting his growing confidence in W.T. Sherman, Grant placed him in charge of a force drawn from the IX, XIII, XV, and XVII Corps to shield the siege operations against potential attack from the east by Joe Johnston's relief force. After Vicksburg fell, Sherman commanded a sizable Expeditionary Army (IX, XIII, and XV Corps) to drive Johnston beyond Jackson and then fell back toward Vicksburg. Maj. Gen. Frederick Steele led Sherman's XV Corps in this operation, which effectively concluded the roles of both the IX Corps and XIII Corps in the Department of the Tennessee.

Grant's capture of Vicksburg, achieved largely by long-established elements of the Army of the Tennessee, was one of the most important Union victories of the war. It opened the Mississippi River for the Union and cut the Confederacy in half. In recognition of his achievement, Grant was promptly elevated to the rank of major general in the regular army. At Halleck's suggestion, Grant then asked Lincoln to give Sherman and McPherson the rank of brigadier general in the regular army, in addition to their rank of major general of volunteers. Sherman later wrote that, with the capture of Vicksburg, "Grant's army had seemingly completed its share of the work of war." Even though much work in fact still lay before the Army of the Tennessee, there is much truth in Sherman's observation. Soon Grant would move on to expanded responsibilities, leaving the Army of the Tennessee in Sherman's hands. And the army itself would shift its operations eastward, closing the 1861–1863 chapter of riverine operations on the Cumberland, the Tennessee, and the Mississippi and beginning a series of epic marches. In addition, after Vicksburg, the Army of the Tennessee would ebb in size and usually operated in tandem with other forces, principally the Army of the Cumberland.

=== Chattanooga and Knoxville ===
After taking Vicksburg, the Army of the Tennessee "lay, as it were, idle for a time." But soon enough the changing roles for the army and its leading figures evidenced themselves in the November 1863 victory achieved by a mixed Union force in the Battles for Chattanooga. To set the stage: In late September 1863, Confederate General Braxton Bragg's Army of Tennessee defeated William Rosecrans's Army of the Cumberland in the Battle of Chickamauga; Rosecrans retreated to Chattanooga, Tennessee, and was besieged there by Bragg. To address this crisis, Washington elevated Grant, the celebrated victor of Vicksburg, to command of the newly created and geographically broad Military Division of the Mississippi and ordered him to travel to Chattanooga, assume command of all forces there, and defeat Bragg. The War Department gave Grant his choice between continuing Rosecrans as commander of the Army of the Cumberland or elevating corps commander George Thomas to head that army; Grant chose Thomas. Grant's forces at Chattanooga eventually included elements of three armies: 35,000 men from the Army of the Cumberland under Thomas; 20,000 men sent west from the Army of the Potomac under Maj. Gen. Joseph Hooker; and 17,000 men from the Army of the Tennessee.

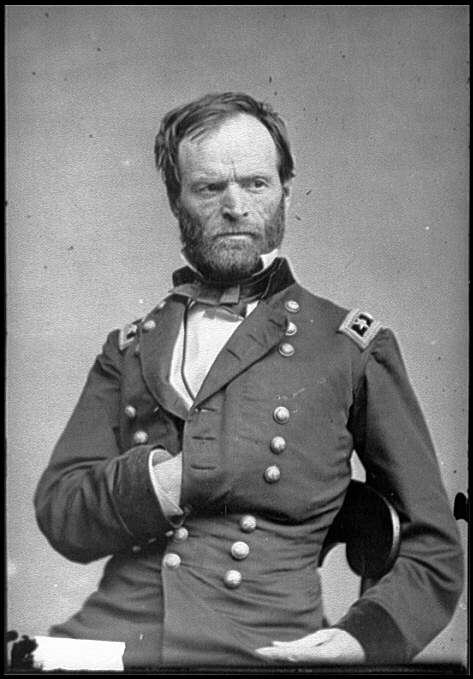
Major General Sherman, second commander of the Army of the Tennessee

It was William Tecumseh Sherman who led the Army of the Tennessee's contingent to Chattanooga, up the Mississippi River from Vicksburg and then east from Memphis. Sherman began his march as a corps commander and ended it as Grant's replacement as commander of "the Department and Army of the Tennessee." He brought to Chattanooga most of his old XV Corps, now placed temporarily under the command of Maj. Gen. Frank P. Blair Jr., and the 2nd Division of the XVII Corps, led by Brig. Gen. John E. Smith. With the arrival of Sherman's force, Grant was prepared to take the offensive and break Bragg's siege. He assigned Sherman to assault the right flank of Bragg's army, at the north end of Missionary Ridge, with three of his four divisions and other troops; this attack was intended to play the major role for the Union. However, in the Battle of Missionary Ridge on November 25, Sherman's attack gained no traction, and it fell to Thomas's Army of the Cumberland to break the Confederate line by assaulting directly up the middle of Missionary Ridge. On this occasion, then, the Army of the Tennessee ended up playing second fiddle to the Army of the Cumberland.

Immediately after Chattanooga, Grant ordered Sherman to take command of a mixed force, including part of the XV Corps, and proceed to break the siege that other Confederate forces had mounted against Ambrose Burnside's command at Knoxville, Tennessee. Sherman's mere approach resulted in the lifting of the siege, allowing Sherman to return to Chattanooga with the XV Corps troops. Sherman later calculated that, in these crises, the XV Corps had marched 330 miles (530 km) from Memphis to Chattanooga and 230 miles (370 km) from Chattanooga to Knoxville and back.

=== Meridian Campaign ===
Only about a third of Sherman's Army of the Tennessee (mostly XV Corps troops) had participated in the Chattanooga and Knoxville campaigns. Most of the XVII Corps had remained on other duties, under McPherson at Vicksburg, and most of the XVI Corps, under Hurlbut at Memphis. In early 1864, Sherman organized from the latter two corps an expedition of 20,000 men to move into central Mississippi to break up Confederate rail communications and other infrastructure and thereby to solidify Union control of the Mississippi River. This force, led by Sherman himself, consisted of two divisions from McPherson's corps and two from Hurlbut's corps. In February, after concentrating at Vicksburg, the force made a largely unopposed round-trip march of approximately 330 miles (530 km) from Vicksburg to Meridian, Missisissippi, and back, in two columns. Hurlbut led the left column, and McPherson, the right. This force destroyed the transportation center at Meridian in mid-February. One recent study of the Meridian campaign describes it as a "dress rehearsal" for the style of war against infrastructure that Sherman, as well as some of these very troops, would later practice in Georgia during the March to the Sea. Another historian has stated that the Meridian campaign taught Sherman that he "could march an army through Confederate territory with impunity and feed it at the expense of the inhabitants. He could wage successful war without having to slaughter thousand of soldiers in the process." The Meridian campaign essentially marked the end of Hurlbut's role in the Army of the Tennessee; subsequently he became commander of the Department of the Gulf.

=== Atlanta Campaign ===
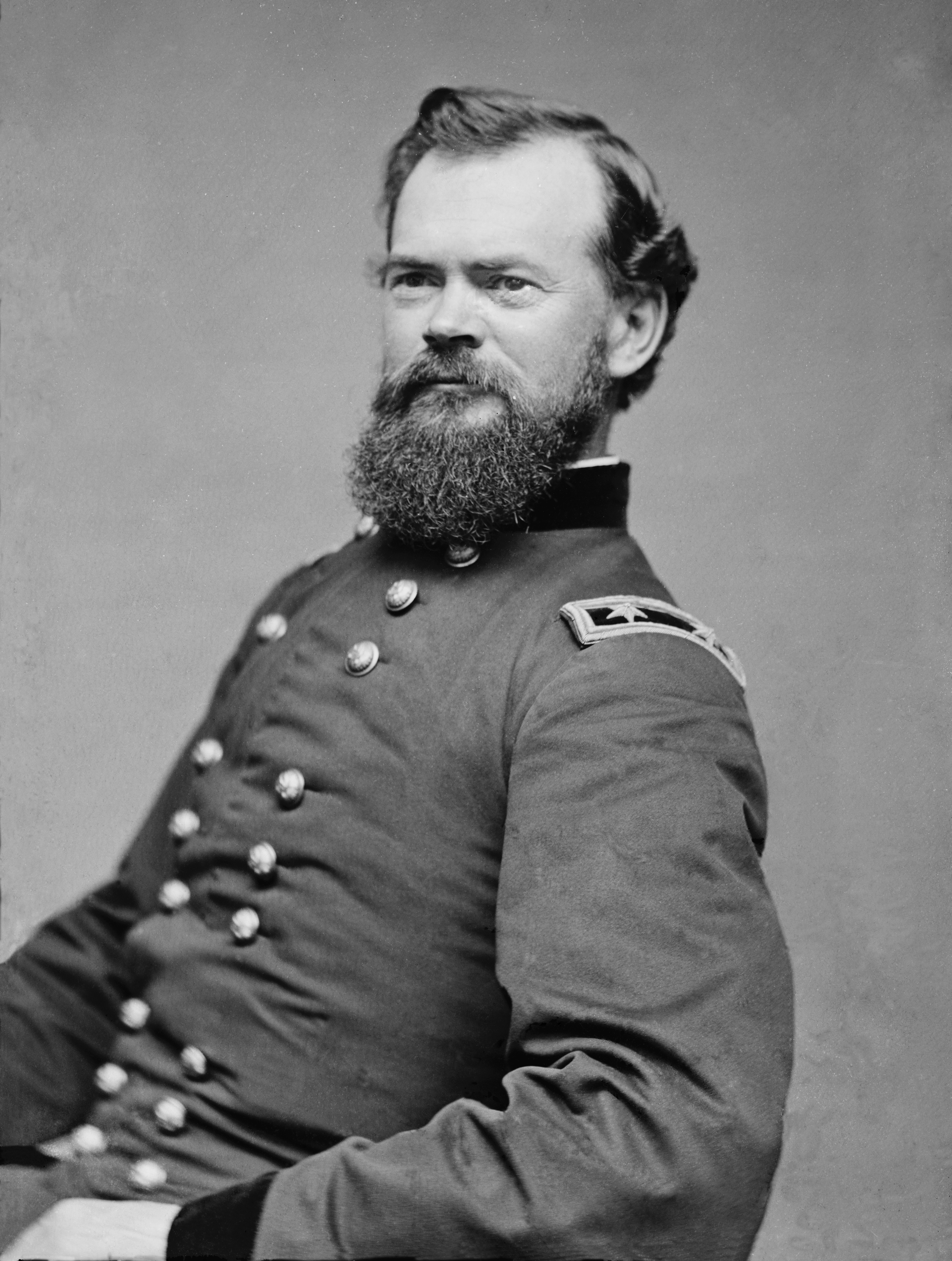
Major General McPherson, third commander of the Army of the Tennessee

Now that Chattanooga was secure, an avenue of invasion lay open into the heart of the Deep South. It fell to Sherman to lead this invasion in the 1864 Atlanta Campaign, with the Army of the Tennessee serving as his "whiplash." To set the stage: In March 1864, Lincoln promoted Ulysses S. Grant to the new rank of Lieutenant general and gave him command of all Union armies; to fulfill that role, Grant relocated to the Eastern Theater and maintained his headquarters thereafter in the field with the Army of the Potomac. In the West, Sherman succeeded Grant in command of the Military Division of the Mississippi. Command of the Army of the Tennessee now passed to the XVII Corps commander, Maj. Gen. James B. McPherson; he had begun his association with his new army as a lieutenant colonel and the chief engineer in Grant's Henry-Donelson force. On the Confederate side, after Chattanooga, Braxton Bragg lost command of the Confederate Army of Tennessee, replaced initially by General Joseph E. Johnston and later by Lt. Gen. John Bell Hood.

Sherman later described the Atlanta campaign, launched in early May, as "a continuous battle of 120 days," fought for "over a hundred miles [160 km]" along the route of the Western & Atlantic Railroad, during "which, day and night, were heard the continuous boom of cannon and the sharp crack of the rifle." For this campaign, the Army of the Tennessee initially numbered about 25,000, consisting of the XV Corps under Maj. Gen. John A. Logan and the Left Wing of the XVI Corps under Brig. Gen. Grenville M. Dodge. Eventually, McPherson also had two divisions of his old XVII Corps, now under Maj. Gen. Frank Blair's command. Sherman's overall force of about 100,000 also included George Thomas's larger Army of the Cumberland and Maj. Gen. John M. Schofield's smaller Army of the Ohio. Typically, Thomas's large force served as Sherman's center, with McPherson and Schofield operating somewhat interchangeably on the wings. During the intricate campaign, having special confidence in his old army, Sherman "prefer[red] to employ the Army of the Tennessee... for flanking maneuvers."

Sherman's Atlanta Campaign Confederate Union

Despite Sherman's confidence in the Army of the Tennessee, one historian has characterized McPherson as the "least aggressive" commander of that army; another considers that he "worried too much about what might be 'on the other side of the hill.'" These qualities, together with troop shortages, may account for McPherson's failure to fully exploit his opportunities early in the campaign, before the Battle of Resaca. As Sherman began his move southward, Johnston was entrenched at Dalton, Georgia. Hoping to threaten Johnston's rear from Resaca, Sherman sent McPherson, on the Union right, to the west of Rocky Face Ridge and through the "unoccupied, unguarded, unobstructed, and unobserved" Snake Creek Gap to Resaca. McPherson did reach Johnston's rear, but assumed a defensive position there, rather than carrying through Sherman's plan to cut Johnston's railroad link to the south. After the rest of Sherman's forces moved up, the first significant battle of the campaign occurred at Resaca (May 13–15). While a much more decisive outcome might have been achieved, Sherman had to be satisfied with Johnston's falling back toward Adairsville.

Resaca set the tone for the first phase of the campaign, as Sherman's armies attempted to maneuver around Johnston, and Johnston continually fell back toward Atlanta. On June 27, Sherman departed from character and attempted a direct assault on Johnston's position at Kennesaw Mountain. When that failed, Sherman swung McPherson from the left around to the right in order to resume his southward progress. On July 18, as the Army of the Tennessee completed a giant wheeling maneuver from Sherman's right to his left and cut the Georgia Railroad east of Decatur, John Bell Hood replaced Johnston as the Confederate commander. The aggressive Hood soon initiated the Battle of Peachtree Creek (July 20); his attack was intended to exploit a gap in the Union lines (between Thomas on the right and Schofield in the center) but ended unsuccessfully. Then, in the Battle of Atlanta on July 22, Hood launched a strong assault against McPherson's army, on Sherman's left. McPherson himself was killed, and command temporarily passed to Maj. Gen. Logan, his senior corps commander. The July 22 battle, writes one historian, was "the climax of the Army of the Tennessee's wartime career," as 27,000 men "defeated the attacks of nearly 40,000 Confederates who had the advantages of surprise and position."

Notwithstanding Logan's battlefield success that day, Sherman chose West Pointer Maj. Gen. Oliver O. Howard, imported from a corps command in Thomas's army, to become the new commander of the Army of the Tennessee. Thereafter, Sherman refocused his efforts west of Atlanta, now swinging the Army of the Tennessee around to his right flank. This led to the Battle of Ezra Church on July 28, where Howard repulsed Hood's third attack in nine days "with ease." However, Sherman also suffered setbacks in cavalry operations at this juncture, and for a month his campaign became more static. He finally broke the impasse in late August, essentially abandoning his positions north and east of Atlanta, and wheeling the Army of the Tennessee well south of Atlanta to attack Hood's last rail communications. On August 31, Howard's army repulsed a final Confederate attack in the first day of the Battle of Jonesborough (August 31 and September 1). With all his rail communications finally severed, Hood evacuated Atlanta during the night of September 1–2. Sherman's capture of Atlanta, facilitated by the prowess of the Army of the Tennessee, "was one of the great epochs of the war, on a level with the seizure of Vicksburg" and contributed importantly to the November reelection of Abraham Lincoln. Sherman later estimated that the XV Corps had "traversed in maneuvering" approximately 178 miles (286 km) during this campaign.

=== March to the Sea ===
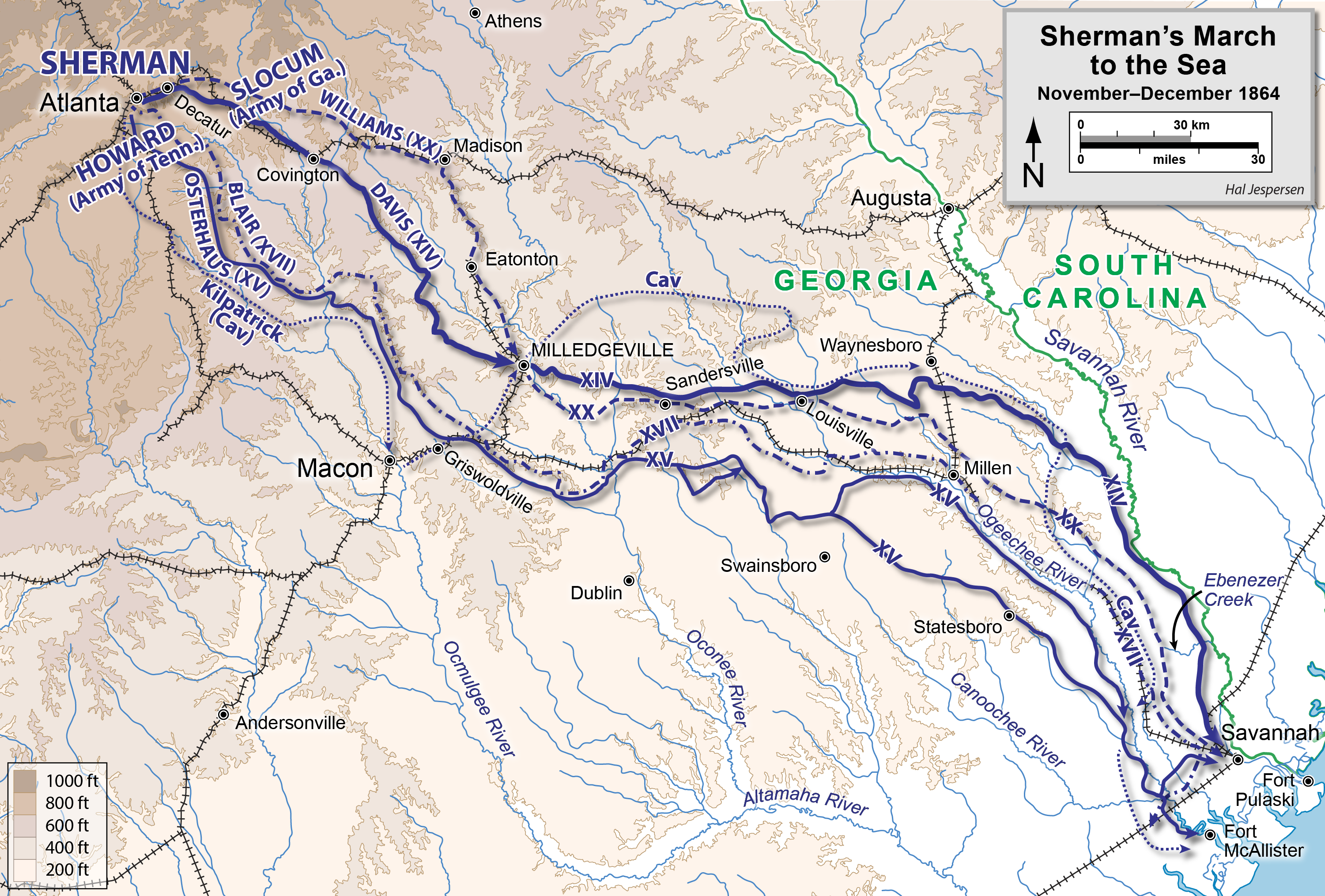
Sherman's March to the Sea

The Army of the Tennessee, under Oliver O. Howard, was now fated to function as Sherman's right arm in the March to the Sea and the Carolinas Campaign, but not immediately. After losing Atlanta in early September, Confederate General Hood regrouped and then sought with some success to lure Sherman back northward by attacking his communications and threatening Tennessee; Sherman estimated that his own regression toward Chattanooga and subsequent return to Atlanta involved 270 miles (430 km) of marching by the Army of the Tennessee. During this period (September–October), Sherman made many adjustments to his forces. One involved dividing Grenville Dodge's XVI Corps troops between the XV and XVII Corps; this ended the role of the XVI Corps with the main Army of the Tennessee.

Ultimately, Sherman received approval from his superiors to detach other forces under George Thomas and John Schofield to defend Tennessee, cut loose from his lines of communication back to Chattanooga, and march southeast to the sea with approximately 60,000 men. In November and December, then, the Army of the Tennessee constituted the right wing during the march of 280 miles (450 km) to the sea; Howard's command at this stage consisted of the XV Corps (now under Maj. Gen. Peter J. Osterhaus in place of Logan) and the XVII Corps (Blair). Sherman's other column, designated the Army of Georgia, was drawn from the Army of the Cumberland; its commander was Maj. Gen. Henry W. Slocum.

Sherman himself characterized his march to the sea as a largely unopposed "'shift of base,' as the transfer of a strong army, which had no opponent, and had finished its then work, from the interior to a point on the sea-coast, from which it could achieve other important results." As is well known, during the march, his troops lived off the land and demoralized the South by extensive destruction of property. (On the eve of the march, one soldier wrote that "[w]e understand... that Sherman intends to use us to Christianize this country.") In the final stage of the march, Sherman called upon his old Shiloh division, now in the Army of the Tennessee's XV Corps and under the command of Brig. Gen. William B. Hazen, to subdue Fort McAllister, outside Savannah, Georgia. On December 21, the march culminated with the capture of Savannah. The Army of the Tennessee and the Army of Georgia thereby allowed Sherman to present Savannah to Lincoln as a "Christmas-gift ... with one hundred and fifty heavy guns and plenty of ammunition, also about twenty-five thousand bales of cotton." Despite Sherman's deprecation of the operational significance of the March to the Sea, it "was one of the major events of the Civil War"; Sherman's virtually unopposed movement through Georgia showed that the Confederacy's "days were numbered" and demoralized the Confederate army in Virginia under Robert E. Lee.

=== Carolinas Campaign ===
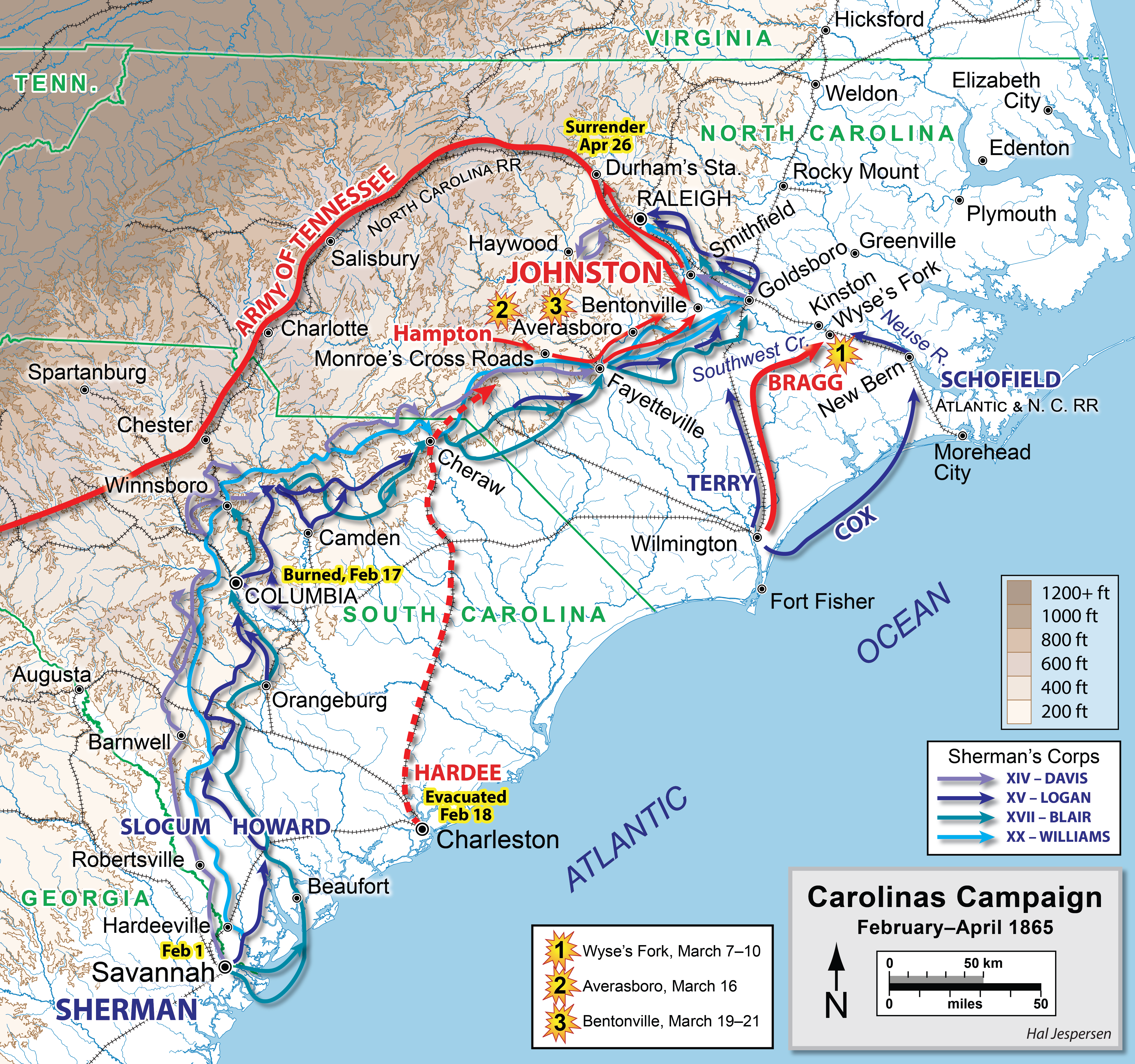
Sherman's Carolinas Campaign

On February 1, 1865, after a month in Savannah, Sherman resumed in force his destructive march, now northward into the Carolinas, with the ultimate objective of concentrating with Grant's forces in Virginia. Howard's Army of the Tennessee again constituted the right wing of a two-column advance, with John Logan now resuming command of the XV Corps and the XVII Corps continuing under Blair. The other column was again composed of Slocum's Army of Georgia. Resistance was scarce in South Carolina, and Sherman's troops worked much destruction on the cradle of secession. (As Sherman exited the state in early March, one soldier observed that South Carolina "has her 'rights' now.") Confederate opposition intensified in North Carolina, led by Sherman's erstwhile foe, Confederate General Joseph E. Johnston. At Sherman's final significant battle, Bentonville in mid March, most of the fighting fell to Slocum's forces. Thereafter, Johnston slipped away to the northwest, and Sherman rendezvoused near Goldsboro with forces Grant had ordered east from Tennessee under John Schofield. The Army of the Tennessee had marched roughly 450 miles (720 km) in 50 days from Savannah to Goldsboro, and it seemed that nothing could long prevent Sherman from concentrating with Grant in Virginia. Sherman later wrote that this was "one of the longest and most important marches ever made by an organized army in a civilized country." Observing Sherman's swift progress, Joe Johnston concluded "that there had been no such army since the days of Julius Caesar."

=== End of War and Disbandment ===
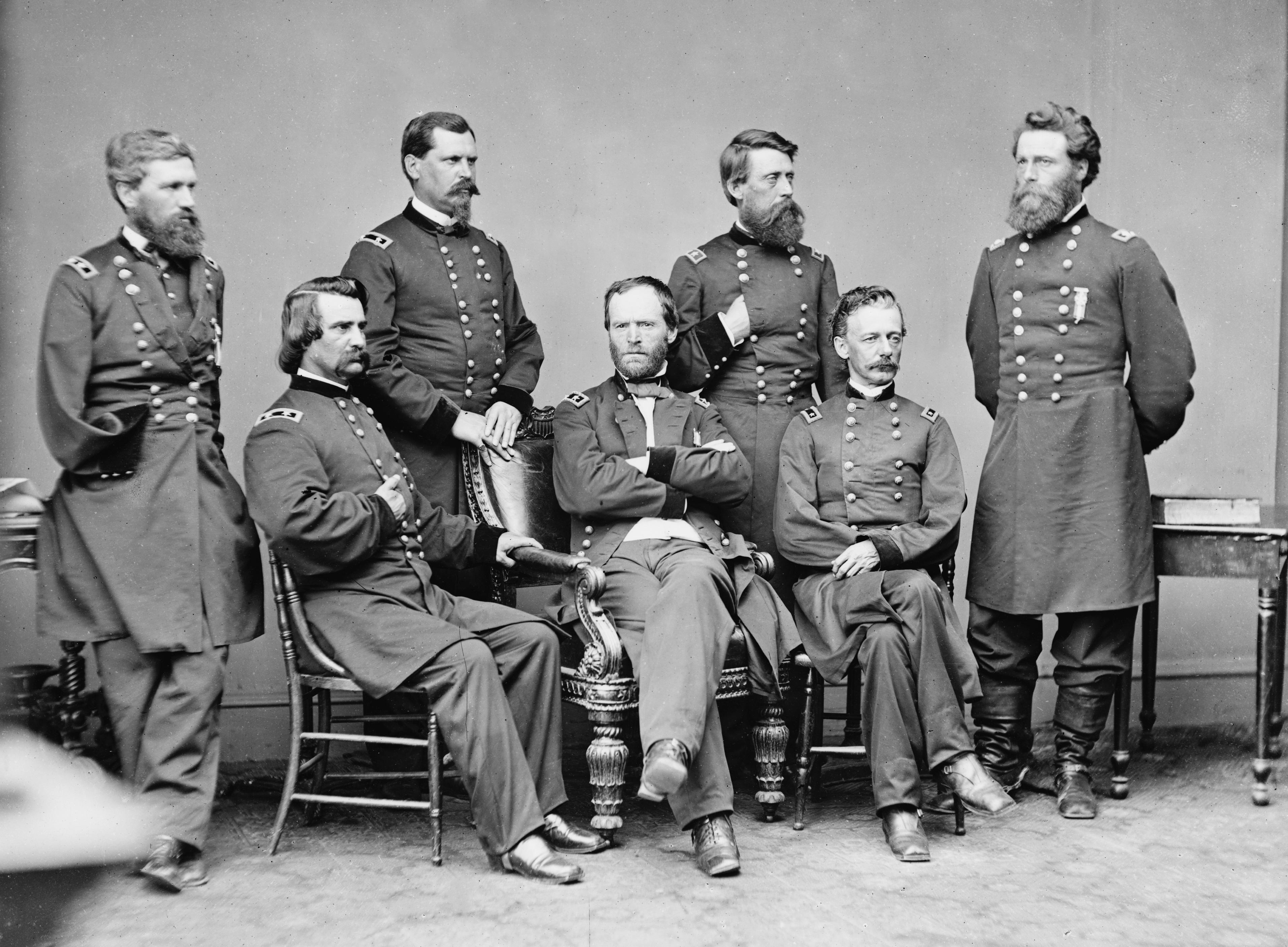
General Sherman at war's end with Generals Howard, Logan, Hazen, Davis, Slocum, and Mower; Howard and Logan were the last two commanders of the Army of the Tennessee

On April 10, 1865, the day after Robert E. Lee surrendered to Grant at the village of Appomattox Court House, Virginia, Sherman resumed his advance, headed toward Raleigh, North Carolina, now with almost 90,000 soldiers—Howard's Army of the Tennessee on the right, Schofield's Army of the Ohio in the center, and Slocum's Army of Georgia on the left. Only learning of Lee's surrender on the night of April 11–12, Sherman had as his immediate target the separate Confederate force under General Johnston, then near Raleigh, but there was little need for further fighting. Sherman entered Raleigh on April 13, and Johnston promptly opened what became prolonged and politically sensitive surrender discussions. On April 26, at Durham Station, Johnston finally surrendered to Sherman all of the Confederate forces in the Carolinas, Georgia, and Florida. The Army of the Tennessee and the Army of Georgia then marched some 250 miles (400 km) to Washington, D.C., and on May 24 participated there with Sherman in the Grand Review.

To salve the injury he had inflicted in bypassing John A. Logan for Oliver Howard after McPherson's death, Sherman arranged in May for Logan to become the final commander of the Army of the Tennessee. Thus, while Howard rode with Sherman, Logan led the army in the Grand Review. On July 13, Logan issued a farewell address to the Army of the Tennessee: "Four years have you struggled in the bloodiest and most destructive war that ever drenched the earth with human gore; step by step you have borne our standard, until to-day, over every fortress and arsenal that rebellion wrenched from us, and over city, town, and hamlet, from the Lakes to the Gulf, and from ocean to ocean, proudly floats the 'Starry emblem' of our national unity and strength." Taps sounded for the Army of the Tennessee on August 1, 1865.

=== Society ===
The preliminary meeting for the formation of the Society of the Army of the Tennessee was held in the senate chamber at the state capitol in Raleigh, North Carolina, on April 14, 1865. Membership in the Society was restricted to officers who had served with the Army of the Tennessee. The Society erected in Washington, D.C., at a cost of $50,000, a bronze statue of Major General John A. Rawlins, and also placed a memorial, costing $23,000, over the grave of Major General James B. McPherson, at Clyde, Ohio. Also erected in Washington by the Society were an equestrian statue of General McPherson, and a monument in memory of General John A. Logan.

== Command history ==
District of Southeast Missouri

Commander	From	To	Major Battles
Brigadier General Ulysses S. Grant	September 1, 1861	December 23, 1861	Belmont

District of Cairo

Commander	From	To	Major Battles
Brigadier General Ulysses S. Grant	December 23, 1861	February 14, 1862	Fort Henry, Fort Donelson

District of West Tennessee

Commander	From	To	Major Battles
Major General Ulysses S. Grant	February 14, 1862	April 30, 1862	Shiloh
Major General Ulysses S. Grant	April 30, 1862	June 10, 1862	Siege of Corinth
Major General Ulysses S. Grant	June 10, 1862	October 16, 1862	Corinth (detachment only)

Department of the Tennessee

Commander	From	To	Major Battles and Campaigns
Major General Ulysses S. Grant	October 16, 1862	October 24, 1863	Vicksburg Campaign, Siege of Vicksburg
Major General William T. Sherman	October 24, 1863	March 26, 1864	Chattanooga, Missionary Ridge, Meridian
Major General James B. McPherson	March 26, 1864	July 22, 1864	Atlanta Campaign, Atlanta
Major General John A. Logan (temp.)	July 22, 1864	July 27, 1864	Atlanta
Major General Oliver O. Howard	July 27, 1864	May 19, 1865	Ezra Church, Jonesborough, March to the Sea, Bentonville
Major General John A. Logan	May 19, 1865	August 1, 1865	
