= Fort C. F. Smith (Bowling Green, Kentucky) =

Historic site in Kentucky, United States

- U.S. National Register of Historic Places
- Kentucky Historic Resources Inventory
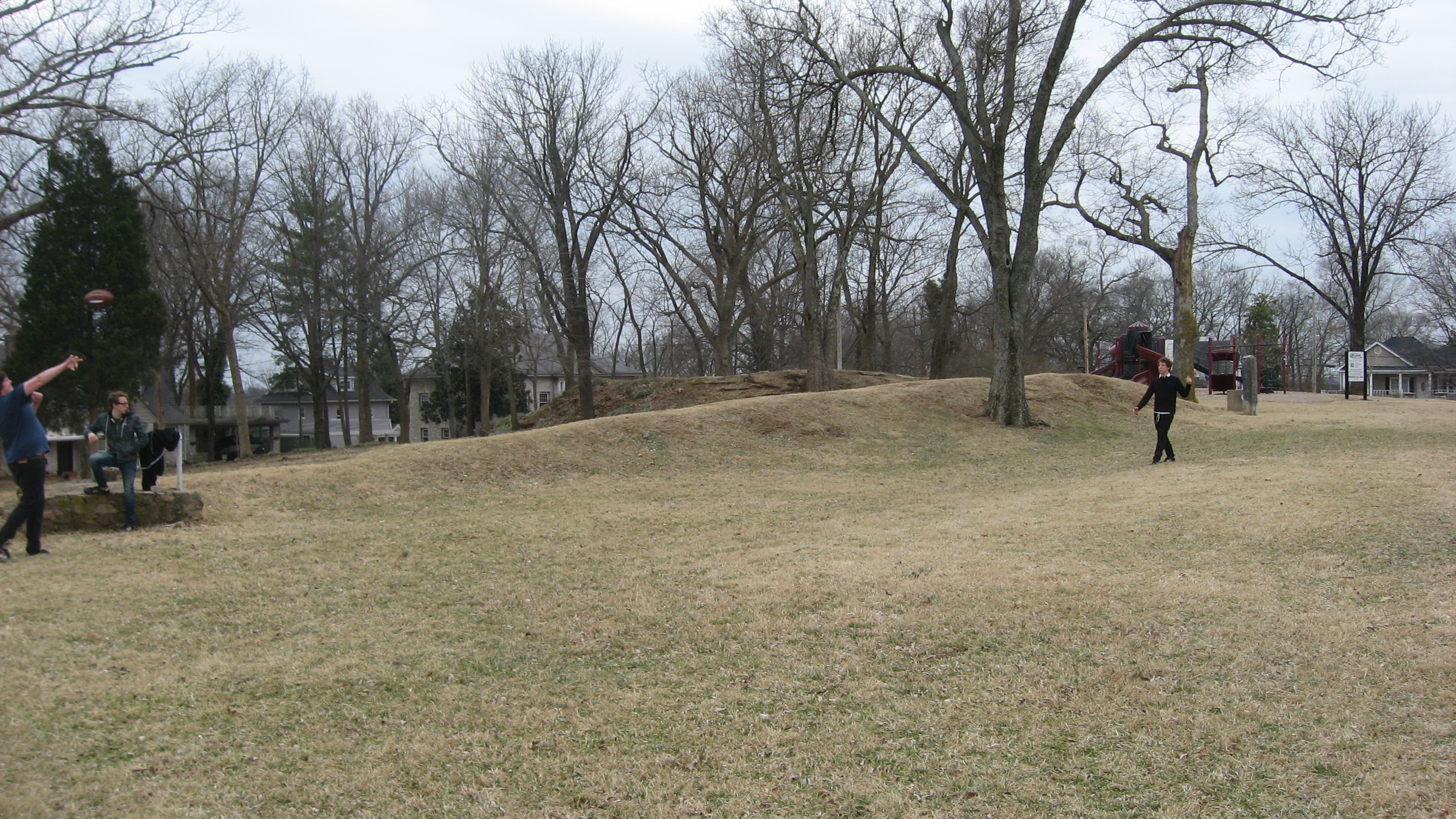
- Part of the fort's earthworks remain visible behind park visitors.

- Location within Kentucky Location within the United States
- Location: 1001 College St., Bowling Green, Kentucky
- Coordinates: 36°59′19.8″N 86°26′13.9″W
- Area: 3 acres (1.2 ha)
- Built: 1862
- NRHP reference No.: 84000847
- KHRI No.: WA-B-232
- Added to NRHP: December 5, 1984

Fort C. F. Smith was a bastion fort constructed in Warren County, Kentucky, between 1861 and 1865, as part of the American Civil War defenses of Bowling Green (see Kentucky in the American Civil War). It was named in honor of General Charles Ferguson Smith, who died from a leg infection that was aggravated by dysentery on April 25, 1862.

Part of a series of fortifications built to defend the city of Bowling Green, Fort C.F. Smith initially began construction under the supervision of the Confederate States of America, who occupied the city between September 1861 and February 1862. Construction was completed under the supervision of the Union Army after the city was captured by Union forces on February 15, 1862.

== History ==
=== Civil War ===
The city of Bowling Green served as an important military stronghold for both Union and Confederate forces during the American Civil War. The city's position between Louisville, Kentucky, and Nashville, Tennessee, along the Louisville and Nashville Railroad made it a strategic defensive position midway along the Confederate line between Kentucky and Tennessee. On September 18, 1861, General Simon Bolivar Buckner occupied Bowling Green with 4,500 troops and began constructing a series of eight earthen fortifications on hills surrounding the town, including what would become Fort C.F. Smith. When Fort Henry and Fort Donelson were captured by Union forces in early February 1862, the Confederate position in Bowling Green became untenable. As the Union Army approached, General Bolivar ordered his forces to evacuate the city on February 14, 1862. After occupying the city on February 15, Union forces continued construction on the city's incomplete fortifications. Fort C.F. Smith was completed in 1862 under the supervision of General Ormsby M. Mitchel and Colonel Benjamin Harrison, future 23rd President of the United States.

=== Post-War ===
Abandoned by the U.S. Army at the conclusion of the war in 1865, the land was purchased by the City of Bowling Green in 1869 for use as a park and reservoir. Known locally as Reservoir Hill, the site has been continuously maintained as a neighborhood park.

Existing remnants of the original earthen fortifications remain visible in the southwest portion of the park, though only approximately 10% of the fort's original construction have survived.
