= Black Isle =

Peninsula in Scotland

Coordinates: 57°35′27″N 4°14′30″W

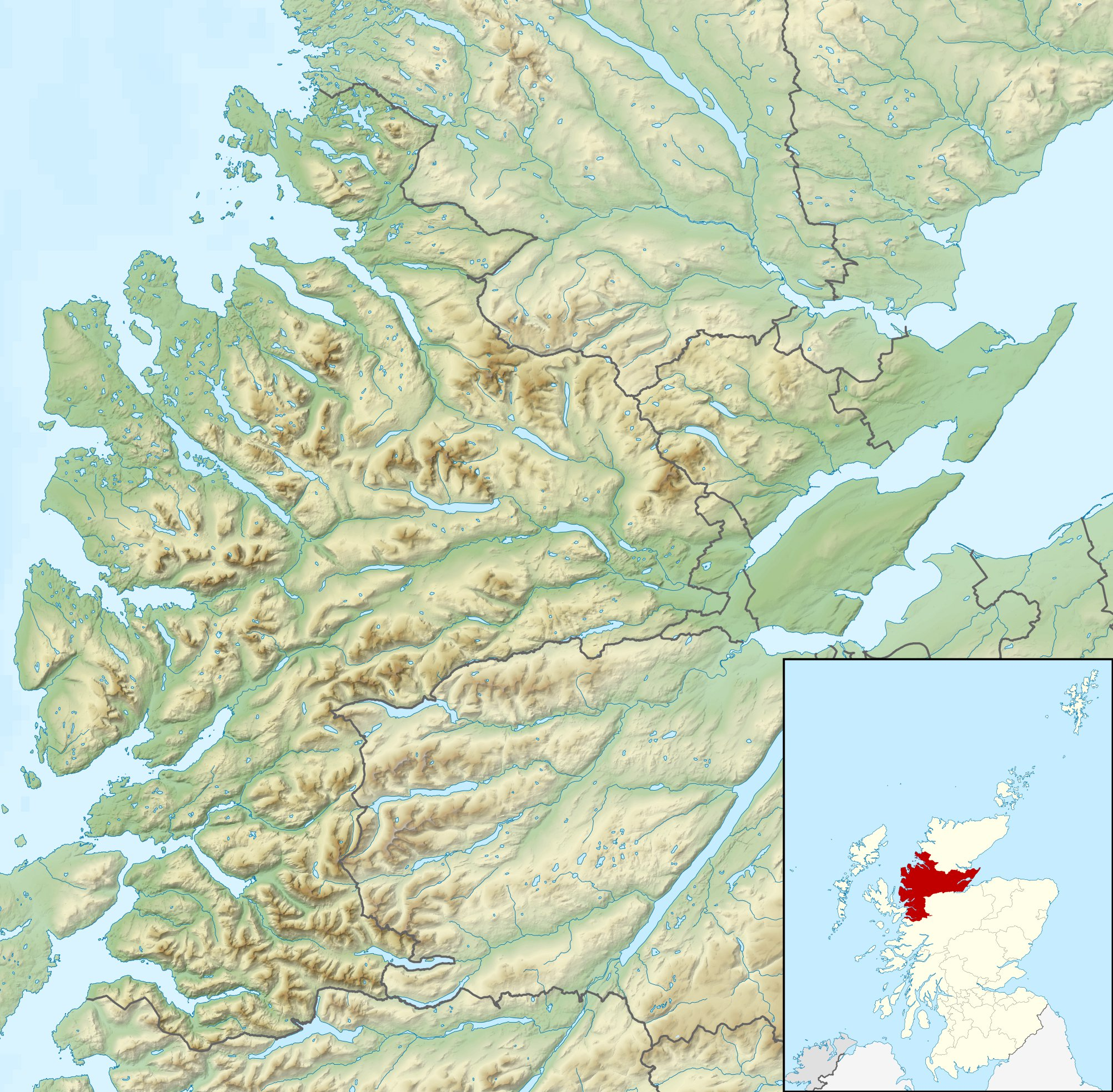
Location within Ross and Cromarty

The Black Isle (Scottish Gaelic: an t-Eilean Dubh, pronounced [ən̪ˠ ˈtʲʰelan ˈt̪uh]) is a peninsula within Ross and Cromarty, in the Scottish Highlands. It includes the towns of Cromarty and Fortrose, and the villages of Culbokie, Resolis, Jemimaville, Rosemarkie, Avoch, Munlochy, Tore, and North Kessock, as well as numerous smaller settlements. About 12,000 people live on the Black Isle, depending on the definition.

It contains the civil parishes of Killearnan, Knockbain, Avoch, Rosemarkie, Cromarty, Resolis, and Urquhart. These parishes had a total population of 12,302 at the 2011 census.

The northern slopes of the Black Isle offer fine views of Dingwall, Ben Wyvis, Fyrish and the deepwater anchorage at Invergordon. To the south, Inverness and the Monadhliath Mountains can be seen.

== Description ==
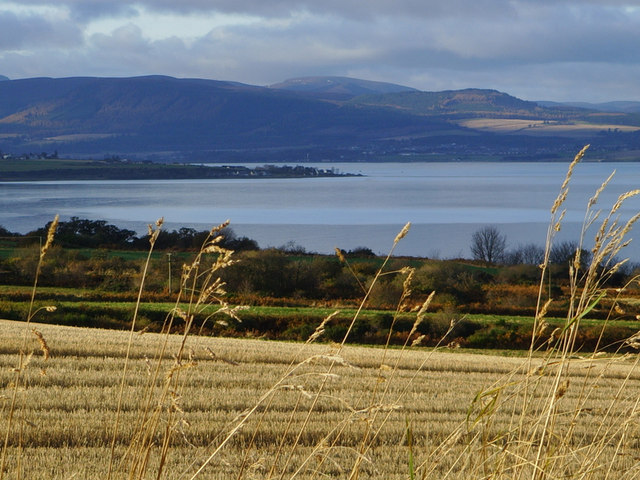
Looking northwest across Newhall Point from a stubble field near Allerton, Black Isle, 4 km from Cromarty

Despite its name, the Black Isle is not an island but a peninsula, surrounded on three sides by the sea – the Cromarty Firth to the north, the Beauly Firth to the south, and the Moray Firth to the east.

On the fourth, western side, its boundary is broadly delineated by rivers. The River Conon, which divides Maryburgh from Conon Bridge, defines the border in the north-west. The south-western boundary is considered by some to be a minor tributary of the River Beauly separating Beauly (in Inverness-shire) and Muir of Ord (on the Black Isle in Ross and Cromarty), dividing the two counties and also delineating the start of the Black Isle. Alternatively, the River Beauly itself is also considered to be the border, thus including Beauly in the Black Isle despite its official placement in Inverness-shire.

There are modern road bridges across the Cromarty and Beauly Firths, which carry the A9 trunk road across the heart of the Black Isle. The last remaining ferry is a summer service from Cromarty to Nigg. The North Coast 500 scenic route crosses the base of the peninsula.

The Black Isle is close to railway stations at Inverness and along the Far North Line to Dingwall, as well as Inverness Airport and the cruise ship terminal at Invergordon. There are a number of hotels and B&Bs on the Black Isle itself, with many more nearby.

Land use is primarily arable farming and forestry. Since the Kessock Ferry across the Beauly Firth was replaced by the bridge, the Black Isle has become something of a commuter zone for Inverness.

The whole of the Black Isle is part of the Presbytery of Ross.

The Black Isle has a wide variety of wildlife including several legally protected areas. It is particularly known for the chance to see bottlenose dolphins at close range, either from wildlife boat operators in Avoch and Cromarty or from the beach at Chanonry Point between Rosemarkie and Fortrose.

== Castles ==
Castles on the Black Isle (whether ruins, or otherwise) include Castlecraig, Redcastle, and Kilcoy Castle. Cromarty House stands on the site of former Cromarty Castle and is built in part from its reclaimed stone and timbers. The tower house, Kinkell Castle was restored in the late 1960s by the well- known sculptor, Gerald Laing. Former castles of the Black Isle for which there are no physical remains include Tarradale Castle, Chanonry Castle and a mound indicating the former site of Ormond Castle.

== History ==
Conventional middle to modern Black Isle history is well documented at a number of visitor centres and cottage museums sprinkled across the peninsula. According to the Encyclopædia Britannica Eleventh Edition, it was originally called Ardmeanach (Scottish Gaelic: ard, 'height'; maniach, 'monk', from an old religious house on the wooded ridge of Mulbuie), and it derived its customary name from the fact that, since snow does not lie in winter, the promontory looks black while the surrounding country is white. However, that is only one theory amongst many.

Rosehaugh, near Avoch, belonged to Sir George Mackenzie, founder of the Advocates' Library in Edinburgh, who earned the sobriquet of "Bloody" from his persecution of the Covenanters. Redcastle, on the shore, near Killearnan church, dates from 1179 and is said to have been the earliest inhabited house in the north of Scotland. On the forfeiture of the earldom of Ross it became a royal castle (being visited by Mary, Queen of Scots), and afterwards passed for a period into the hands of the Mackenzies of Gairloch. Previously, the Black Isle had been Munro country.

The Black Isle was one of the earliest parts of the northern Highlands to experience the clearances and was settled with many Lowland shepherds and farmers, especially from the north east.

Hugh Miller, self-taught geologist and writer, was born in Cromarty where his cottage is now a National Trust for Scotland museum.

Alexander Mackenzie, who crossed Canada overland in 1793 and gave his name to the Mackenzie River, is buried near Avoch.

Between 1989 and 1994, 93 red kites of Swedish origin were reintroduced to the Black Isle.

From 1894 until 1960 the Black Isle Railway, known officially as the Fortrose Branch, ran from Muir of Ord to Fortrose.

== Education ==
The principal secondary school on the Black Isle is Fortrose Academy which currently has around 658 pupils. As of 2023, Fortrose Academy is one of the top 100 secondary schools in Scotland. There are a number of primary schools (listed below), most of whom transfer pupils to Fortrose Academy when they become of age, whilst the others transfer pupils to Dingwall or Charleston Academies.

- Avoch Primary School
- Beauly Primary School (Feeds to Charleston Academy)
- Ben Wyvis Primary School (Feeds to Dingwall Academy)
- Cromarty Primary School
- Culbokie Primary School
- Ferintosh Primary School (Feeds to Dingwall Academy)
- Mulbuie Primary School (Feeds to Dingwall Academy)
- Munlochy Primary School
- North Kessock Primary School
- Resolis Primary School
- Tarradale Primary School (Feeds to Dingwall Academy)
- Tore Primary School

== Culture ==
In addition to its Gaelic heritage, the Black Isle had its own dialect of North Northern Scots, used mainly among fisherfolk in Avoch and Cromarty, where it became extinct in October 2012, upon the death of Bobby Hogg, the last native speaker.

Now barely used, there are Clootie well sites at Munlochy, Jemimaville and Avoch.

The prophet the Brahan Seer was, according to legend, murdered at Chanonry Point after his predictions revealed a scandalous affair.

Anne MacLeod, the writer, lives on the Black Isle.

Composer/musician Neil Grant is originally from Culbokie.

Harpist and singer Corrina Hewat grew up on the Black Isle.

Fashion designer Siobhan Mackenzie grew up on the Black Isle.

== See also ==
- Easter Ross
- Ross-shire
- Cromartyshire
- Ross and Cromarty
- Rosehaugh House
