= Neil Grant (musician) =

Scottish musician

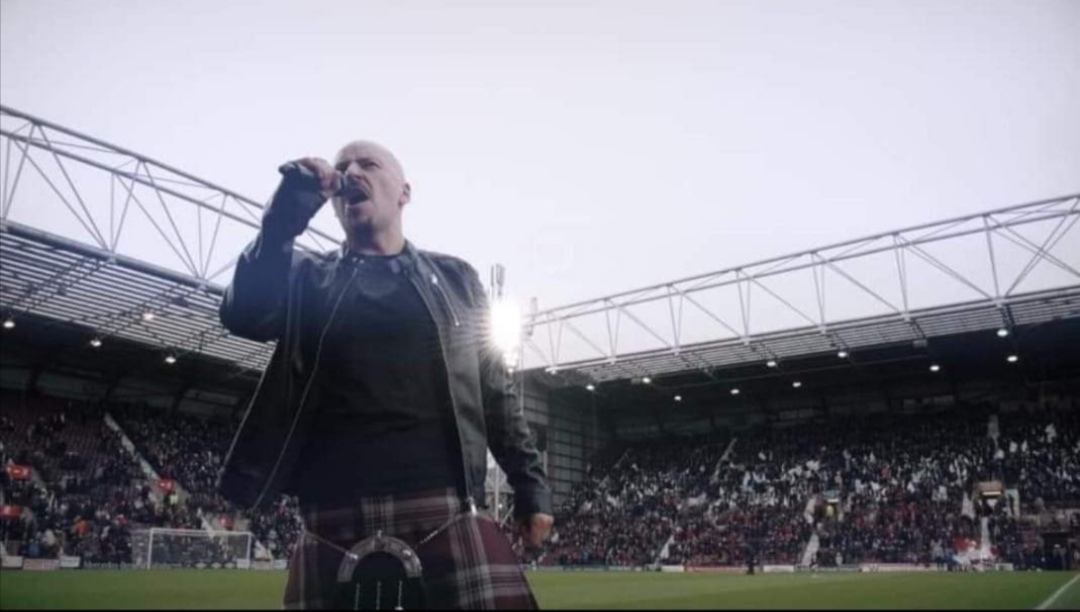
Neil Grant

Neil Grant is a Scottish musician best known for his work composing football anthems. He is originally from the Scottish highland village of Culbokie in The Black Isle.

== Career ==
Grant's most recognisable work is the folk-anthem he composed for Heart of Midlothian Football Club, which was performed live before the kickoff of the Edinburgh derby at Tynecastle Park at the request of the club.

He has also written anthems for Ross County, St Johnstone, St Mirren F.C., and Cowdenbeath.

Grant's background is mainly in heavy metal music, and he recorded and toured as a drummer with RAAR and End of level boss,
