= Angus Beaton =

Angus Beaton CMG VD
- Born: Angus John Beaton; 1858; Munlochy, Scotland, UK
- Died: 29 September 1945 (aged 86–87); London, England, UK
- Occupations: Railway engineer and soldier
- Military career
- Allegiance: United Kingdom
- Branch: Volunteer Force
- Service years: 1897–1918
- Rank: Lieutenant colonel

Angus John Beaton CMG VD (1858–1945) was a Scottish engineer best known for his contribution to the development of railways in South Africa. He served on the Field Intelligence Staff in the South African Field Force, 7th Dragoon Guards in the Anglo-Boer War from October 1900 to May 1902.

== Early life ==
Beaton was born at Munlochy, Scotland. He was the eldest son of John Beaton. He was educated at the Munlochy Public School, Inverness Royal Academy and Owens College, Manchester. He was articled to James Fraser, a consulting engineer of Inverness. In 1884 he joined the London and North Western Railway at Bangor, Wales. He stayed with the company for 16 years. Major duties included general maintenance and work on the Standedge New Tunnel (1890–1894), widening 24 kilometres (15 mi) of railway including the Severn Viaduct (1894–1897) and enlargement of Shrewsbury railway station.

In 1900 he had joined the Institution of Civil Engineers, was a Fellow of the Society of Antiquaries of Scotland and engaged for six months by the Military School of Instruction at Chelsea Barracks.

== Military service ==
Beaton was a committed member of the Volunteer Force having been appointed Second Lieutenant (Supernumary) in the 1st (Ross Highland) Volunteer Battalion, Seaforth Highlanders in March 1897, and then promoted to Lieutenant three years later in June 1900.

From, October 1900 until May 1902, Beaton served in the Boer War as an agent with the Field Intelligence Department attached to the 7th (Princess Royal's) Dragoon Guards and was awarded the Queen's South Africa medal with Cape Colony clasp

After the war, Beaton's volunteer service continued in South Africa and he was granted the honorary rank of Captain in 1905. Some of his exploits in South Africa were colorfully described in a local newspaper.

During World War I, Beaton served with the rank of major in German South West Africa then as lieutenant colonel in East Africa.

Towards the end of WWI, in 1918, he was appointed Companion of the Order of Saint Michael and Saint George "for services rendered in connection with military operations in German South-West Africa". At the time, he was a member of the South African Engineer Corps.

== Civilian service in South Africa ==
In May 1902, Beaton joined Cape Government Railways and from January 1903 was in charge of all new works on Central South African Railways. After the union of South Africa in 1910 he became Assistant Engineer-in-Chief of South African Railways and Harbours Administration.

Beaton was a member of the South African Association for the Advancement of Science and the South African Society of Civil Engineers, including as president in 1923.

He was appointed a Companion of the Order of St Michael and St George in 1918 "for services rendered in connection with military operations in German South-West Africa."

== Personal life ==
Beaton married Florence Caroline Bredell in Johannesburg in 1908. They had two sons and a daughter. Following his retirement in South Africa, Beaton returned to the United Kingdom and lived at Cheltenham, Gloucestershire and later in London.

Beaton died on 29 September 1945 in Norwood and District Cottage Hospital, Norwood, London aged 87.

== See also ==
- Angus John Beaton, Illustrated Guide to Fortrose and Vicinity (Inverness, W. Mackay, 1885)
