= Anne MacLeod =

Scottish writer

Anne MacLeod (born 1951) is a Scottish writer.

She was born in Aberfeldy and grew up in Inverness. MacLeod studied medicine at the University of Aberdeen and works as a dermatologist. She is the mother of four children. MacLeod lives on the Black Isle.

She has published two collections of poetry:

- Standing by Thistles (1997)
- Just the Caravaggio (1999)

both of which were well-received by critics. She has also published two novels The Dark Ship (2001) and The Blue Moon Book (2004).
