= Resolis =

Coordinates: 57.656682°N 4.2355459°W

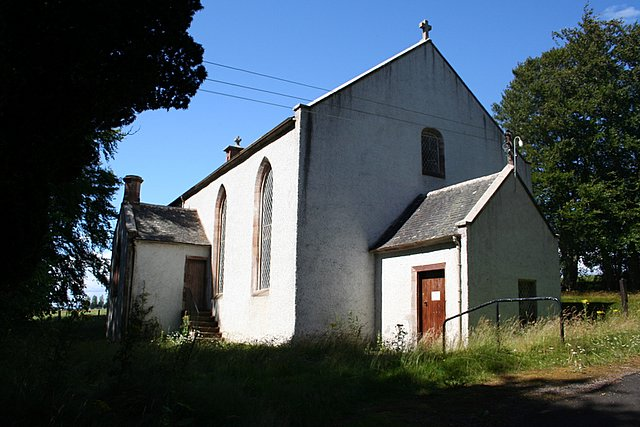

- Location within the Highland council area
- Population: 362 (2011)
- OS grid reference: NH6754365614
- Civil parish: Resolis
- Council area: Highland
- Lieutenancy area: Ross and Cromarty
- Country: Scotland
- Sovereign state: United Kingdom
- Police: Scotland
- Fire: Scottish
- Ambulance: Scottish

Resolis (from the Scottish Gaelic Ruigh Sholais meaning Bright Slope) is a village and parish on the B9163 road, in the Black Isle in Scotland. It is part of the Presbytery of Ross. In 2011 it had a population of 362.

At the 2011 census, the population of the civil parish was 911. The area of the parish is 12,472 acres. Resolis parish is also a community council area.

Resolis has a fairly large hall nearby "Resolis Community Hall" which is used by "Resolis Community Arts" and available for booking. This is often used by Scouts in order to set up camps. In 2025, it was used as a filming location on Episode 8 of the first series of The Celebrity Traitors.

The area has a school, "Resolis Primary School" which is associated with "Fortrose Academy." The school has approximately 60 pupils and also has pre-school education. They also offer Gaelic teachings, leading up to "Gaelic Medium"

== Notable people ==
- Rev Hector Cameron born and raised here.
