= Wilweorthunga =

Old English practice of fountain or well worship

Ƿilƿeorþunga is the Old English practice of fountain or well worship. This belief was banned in the 16th Canon Law enacted under King Edgar of England (939–946) in the tenth century.

== See also ==
- Clootie well
- Well dressing
