= Clootie well =

Holy well or spring, usually with tree

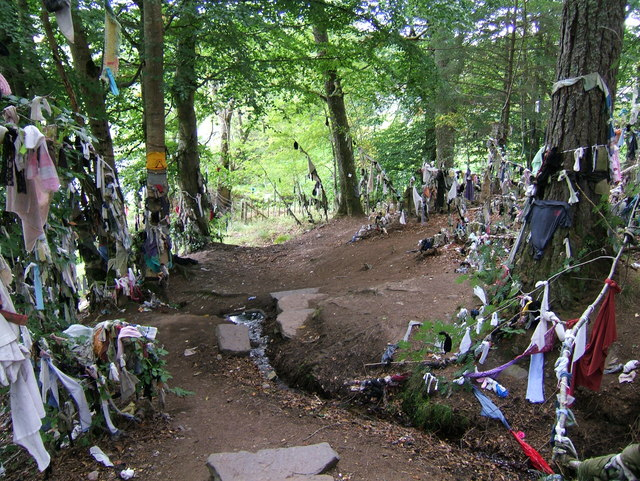
The clootie well near Munlochy, on the Black Isle, Scotland

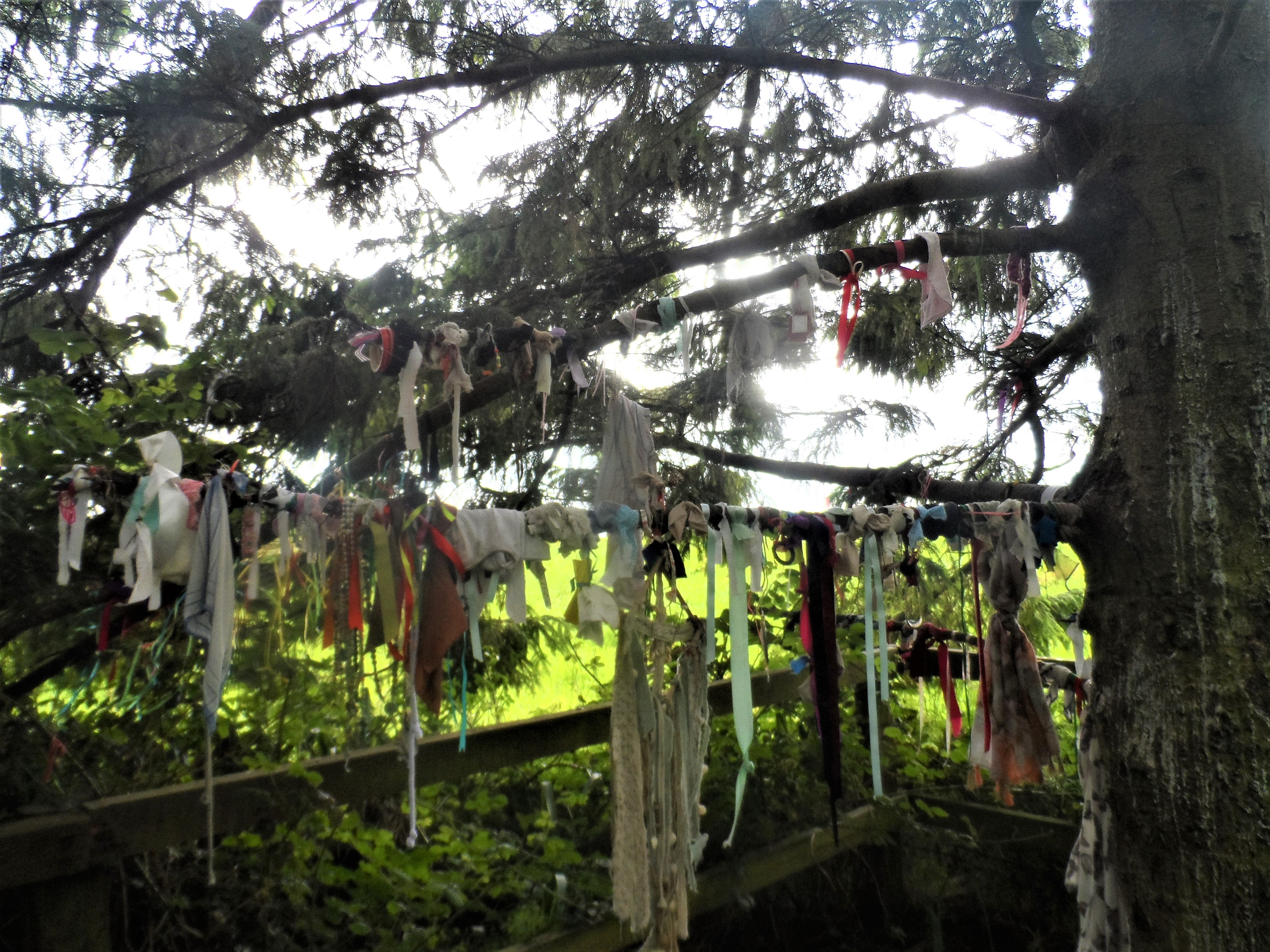
Clootie tree next to St Brigid's Well, Kildare, Ireland

A clootie well is a holy well (or sacred spring), almost always with a tree growing beside it, where small strips of cloth or ribbons are left as part of a healing ritual, usually by tying them to branches of the tree (called a clootie tree or rag tree). Clootie wells are places of pilgrimage usually found in Celtic areas. It is believed that the tradition comes from the ancient custom of leaving votive offerings in water. In Scots, a clootie or cloot is a strip of cloth or rag.

== Practices ==
When used at the clootie wells in Scotland, Ireland, and the Isle of Man, the pieces of cloth are generally dipped in the water of the holy well and then tied to a branch while a prayer of supplication is said to the spirit of the well – in modern times usually a saint, but in pre-Christian times a goddess or local nature spirit. This is most often done by those seeking healing, though some may do it simply to honour the spirit of the well. In either case, many see this as a probable continuation of the ancient Celtic practice of leaving votive offerings in wells or pits.

There are local variations to the practice. At some wells the tradition is to wash the affected part of the body with the wet rag and then tie the washing-rag on the branch; as the rag disintegrates over time, the ailment is supposed to fade away as well. At some wells the clooties are definitely "rags" and discards, at others, brightly coloured strips of fine cloth. In some locations the ceremony may also include circumambulation (or circling) of the well a set number of times and making an offering of a coin, pin, or stone. Additional votive offerings hung on the branches or deposited in the wells may include rosaries, religious medals, crosses, religious icons and other symbols of faith.

At clootie wells where the operative principle is to shed the ailment, and the clootie is thought to represent the ailment, the "offerings" may be grotesque castoffs. Those that instead view the clootie as an offering to the spirit, saint or deity are more likely to tie an attractive, clean piece of cloth or ribbon.

The sacred trees at clootie wells are usually hawthorn trees, though ash trees are also common.

The most popular times for pilgrimages to clootie wells, like other holy wells, are on the feast days of Saints, the Pattern or Patron day, or on the old Gaelic festival days of Imbolc (1 February), Beltane (1 May), Lughnasadh (1 August), or Samhain (1 November).

== Locations ==
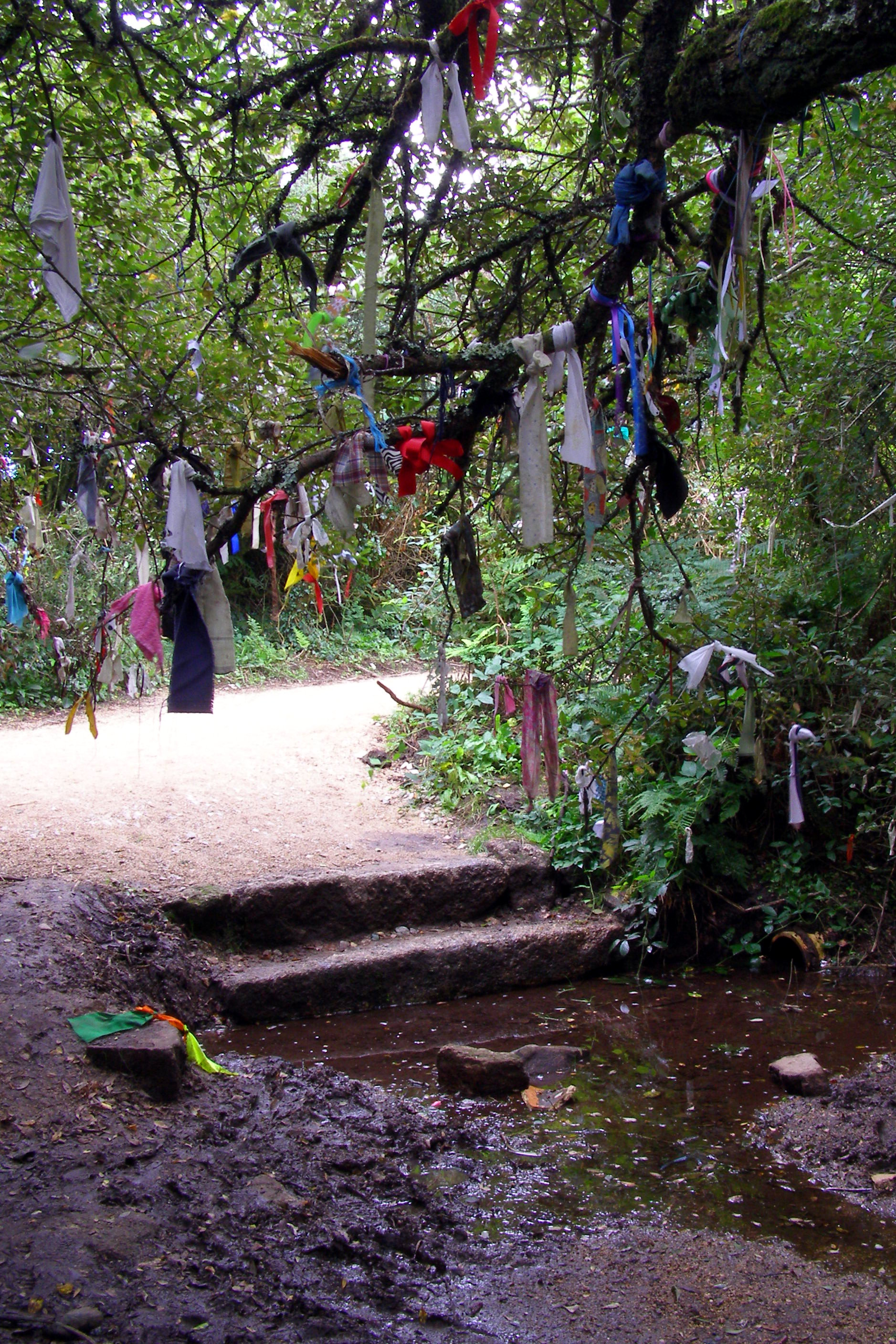
Cloths tied to a tree near Madron Well in Cornwall

In Scotland, by the village of Munlochy on the A832, is a clootie well (called in Scottish Gaelic: Tobar Churadain) at an ancient spring dedicated to Saint Curetán, where rags are still hung on the surrounding bushes and trees. Here the well was once thought to have had the power to cure sick children who were left there overnight. The site sometimes needs to be cleared of non-biodegradable materials and rubbish such as electrical items and a venetian blind.

In the heart of Culloden woods near the battlefield is a walled clootie well also known as St Mary's well. This well was traditionally visited on the first Sunday in May. Until recently, it was a popular holiday, with an ice-cream van situated in the car park. However, this tradition is now in decline although still marked. Craigie Well at Avoch on the Black Isle has both offerings of coins and clooties. Rags, wool and human hair were also used as charms against sorcery, and as tokens of penance or fulfilment of a vow. A clootie well once existed at Kilallan near Kilmacolm in Renfrewshire. This holy well was dedicated to St Fillan and cloth was tied to overhanging shrub branches.

In Cornwall, at Madron Well (SW446328) the practice is to tie the cloth and as it rots the ailment is believed to disappear. In 1894 Madron Well was said to be the only Cornish well where rags were traditionally tied. Rags have only appeared at other Cornish wells such as Alsia Well (SW393251) and Sancreed Well (SW417293) in about the last 30 years. Christ's Well at Mentieth was described in 1618 "as all tapestried about with old rags".

In Ireland at Loughcrew, Oldcastle, County Meath (53°44′36″N 7°08′03″W) there is a wishing tree, where visitors to the passage tombs tie ribbons to the branch of a hawthorn tree. Loughcrew is a site of considerable historical importance in Ireland. It is the site of megalithic burial grounds dating back to approximately 3500 and 3300 BC, situated near the summit of Sliabh na Caillí and on surrounding hills and valleys.

== Popular culture ==
In 2002, the folklorist Marion Bowman observed that the number of clootie wells had "increased markedly" both at existing and new locations in recent years. She added that those engaged in the practice often conceived of it as an ancient "Celtic" activity which they were perpetuating.

A fictional clootie well at Auchterarder features in the 2006 novel The Naming of the Dead by Ian Rankin, who visited the clootie well at Munlochy on Black Isle before writing the book.

The 2018 film The Party's Just Beginning, written and directed by Inverness-born filmmaker Karen Gillan, features the Munlochy clootie well.

The 2022 film The Wonder, starring Florence Pugh and Kíla Lord Cassidy, contains two scenes involving a local clootie tree and well (called "the holy well") with a brief explanation of the ritual

== See also ==
- Culloden, Scotland
- Sacred grove
- Well dressing
- Wilweorthunga
- Wish tree
- Nuragic holy well
