= Siobhan Mackenzie =

Scottish fashion designer

Siobhan Mackenzie is a fashion designer from the Scottish Highlands. She is known for her sustainable practices and her use of tartan. Mackenzie has made outfits for Team Scotland to wear in the Commonwealth Games. Her work has also been worn on the television franchise The Traitors.

== Early life and education ==
Siobhan Mackenzie was born on the Black Isle in the Scottish Highlands. Her father was an environment officer. She was educated at Fortrose Academy.

Mackenzie's interest in fashion came from her great-grandmother, a professional seamstress. She bought her first sewing machine when she was 13-years-old, and she was taught to sew by a home economics teacher.

She earned a First Class Honours degree in Fashion Design & Production in a joint programme organised by Manchester Metropolitan University and Glasgow Kelvin College. She also worked an internship with Glenisla Kilts, a kiltmaking company in Motherwell.

== Career ==
Mackenzie launched her fashion label five days after graduating with her Fashion Design & Production degree. Her early career was supported by a £4000 loan from the Prince's Trust.

Mackenzie has worked with brands including Ferrari, LVMH Group and Barbour. She has created clothes for celebrities including:

- Greg James
- Arielle Free
- Self Esteem
- Nadia El-Nakla
- Harriet Slater
- Sam Heughan
- Jamie Roy
- Jared Leto
- Justin Bieber
- Judy Murray
- Shania Twain

In 2023, she was commissioned to create a custom silk scarf for King Charles III: he was reportedly "delighted" by it. She has designed outfits worn in The Traitors UK and US. Mackenzie alleged that one of her designs made for Alan Cumming to wear while hosting the American edition of the show was later stolen by NBC and reproduced as merchandise without her consent. NBC removed these items from its merchandise store.

Mackenzie's designs are known for the use of tartan. On tartan, Mackenzie has said, "I love to take its heritage and express it in silhouettes and textures that feel current." Mackenzie also considers sustainability to be important to her work.

Mackenzie has been awarded a place on The King Foundations' 35 under 35 list, and she was recognised as Best New Scottish Designer 2016 at the Scottish Variety Awards. She has received recognition from the International Design Awards, and she is one of two Scottish designers with garments sold in the New York department store Bergdorf Goodman. Her work has been shown at Paris Fashion Week.

In 2025, Mackenzie designed the official tartan for the 2026 Commonwealth Games, which will be hosted in Glasgow. The steel-coloured base of this tartan was inspired by Glasgow's industrial history. Additionally, she designed unique Opening Ceremony outfits to be used by Team Scotland. When these outfits were unveiled, members of the public criticised that Mackenzie's designs featured a mini-skirt, which was perceived as misogynistic. Mackenzie defended the design by saying that the skirt comes in three lengths for athletes to pick from and that "[t]he mini style has historically been the most popular choice" among them. She also condemned the racism directed towards the models (Adam Belarbi and Victoria Epia) who wore her designs in promotional photoshoots. Mackenzie previously worked as a tailoring technician in the 2014 Commonwealth Games, and designed outfits for Team Scotland in the 2018 and 2022 Commonwealth Games.

Also in 2025, Mackenzie became the first designer in residence at Kimpton Blythswood Square Hotel and Spa, Glasgow's only five-star hotel. 25 of her designs were showcased within the hotel in an exhibition entitled A Journey Through Creation, and she created a custom tartan for the hotel, which will be used in its interior design.

== Personal life ==
Mackenzie is an ambassador for the mental health charity Mikeysline. In 2026, she plans to hike 58 km across Iceland to raise money for Mikeysline. She has previously attended a Burns Supper that also fundraised for Mikeysline.

In 2026, Mackenzie's pet dog (a Biewer terrier named Gigi) was fatally attacked by another dog in Fortrose. The attack was subject to a Police Scotland investigation.
