= James Mackenzie, Lord Royston =

Scottish judge

James Mackenzie, Lord Royston (1671–1744) was a Scottish judge and Senator of the College of Justice.

== Life ==
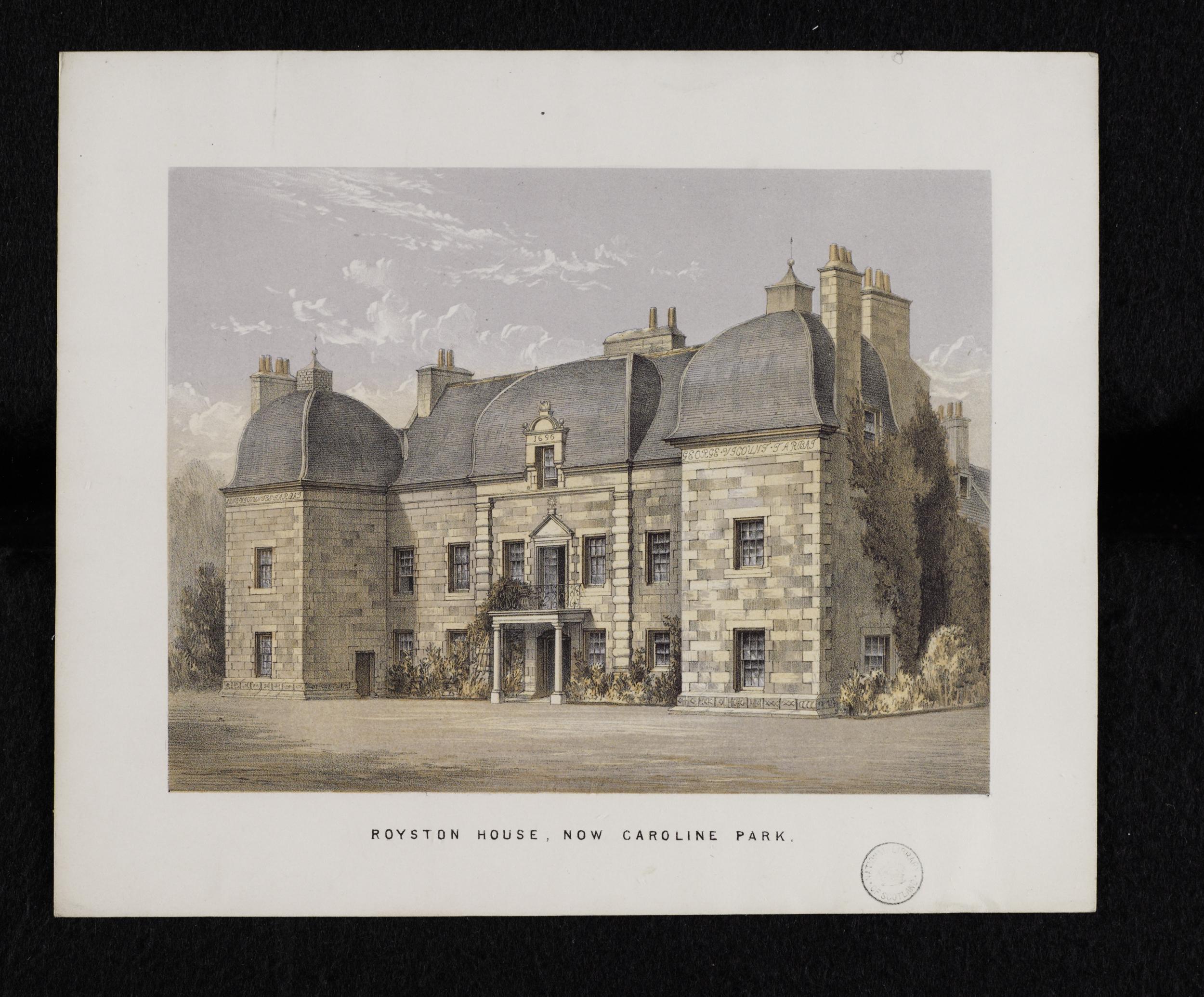
Royston House, now known as Caroline Park House

He was born in 1671 the son of George Mackenzie, 1st Earl of Cromartie by his first wife.

In 1683 his father built "Royston House" a mansion north of Edinburgh. The house was designed by Robert Mylne.

On 7 June 1710 he was created a Senator of the College of Justice taking the title Lord Royston, in place of his paternal uncle Roderick Mackenzie, Lord Prestonhall who resigned due to ill health.

In 1714 he inherited Royston House on the death of his father. In 1739 he sold the house to John Campbell, 2nd Duke of Argyll.

He died on 9 November 1744.

== Family ==
He married a distant cousin, Elizabeth MacKenzie daughter of Sir George Mackenzie of Rosehaugh and widow of Sir Archibald Cockburn of Langton.

Anne Dick was his daughter.
