= Rosehaugh House =

Heritage site in Scotland

Designations

Inventory of Gardens and Designed Landscapes in Scotland
- Official name: Rosehaugh
- Designated: 30 March 2003
- Reference no.: GDL00326

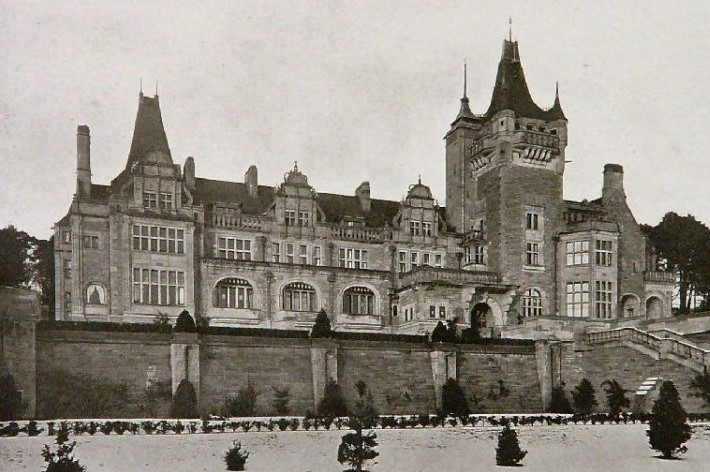
Rosehaugh House, view from the south-west, around 1910

Rosehaugh House was an estate located near the village of Avoch in the Highland council area of Scotland. It consisted of a manor house, gardens, parkland, agricultural land, and several outlying buildings. The property has been documented since the 14th century and was one of the estates of the regionally dominant Mackenzies. In the 17th century, the lawyer and later Lord Advocate George Mackenzie of Rosehaugh resided there, known for his role in witch trials. He built the earliest documented manor house there. The Mackenzie family inherited Rosehaugh as their seat. James Fletcher, a merchant, acquired Rosehaugh in the 1860s after the insolvency of James Mackenzie, 6th Baronet. Fletcher modernised and expanded agricultural and livestock activities at Rosehaugh. In 1953, following the death of his son's widow, an insurance company purchased the estate for commercial purposes.

After the Fletchers' extensive additions and remodelling, Rosehaugh House was considered the epitome of opulent late Victorian architecture. In the 1950s, the cost of maintaining the manor house was deemed economically unviable by the owner, leading to its demolition in 1959. Only several exterior buildings remain, which are currently being restored and rented out as living spaces or holiday homes. Fifteen of the surviving outbuildings are classified as category "B" or "C" monuments in the Scottish heritage lists. The former dairy is of particular note, as it is protected as a category "A" listed building. The estate, along with its former park and gardens, is considered particularly significant by Historic Environment Scotland, which has awarded it the highest rating of "outstanding" in two of six categories.

== History ==
The estate dates back to the 14th century and has had several names over time, including Petconachy (1456), Petquhonochty (1458), Pettenochy (1527), Pittanicty (1745–1750; Roy's Map of Scotland), and finally Pittanochtie. Its name may have originated from the Gaelic Pit Dhonnachaidh, meaning "Duncan's place" or "Duncan's court". Rosehaugh, on the other hand, indicated the land adjacent to Pittanochtie. The name Rosehaugh is derived from the words "rose" and "haugh". "Rose" may refer to the vine rose or Gaelic "ros(s)" meaning "(rock) ledge". "Haugh" is an obsolete term for river meadow. Therefore, Rosehaugh means either "rose meadow" or "meadow at the (rock) ledge". The stream Rosehaugh Burn originates on the estate and flows into Avoch Bay on the Moray Firth as Avoch Burn.

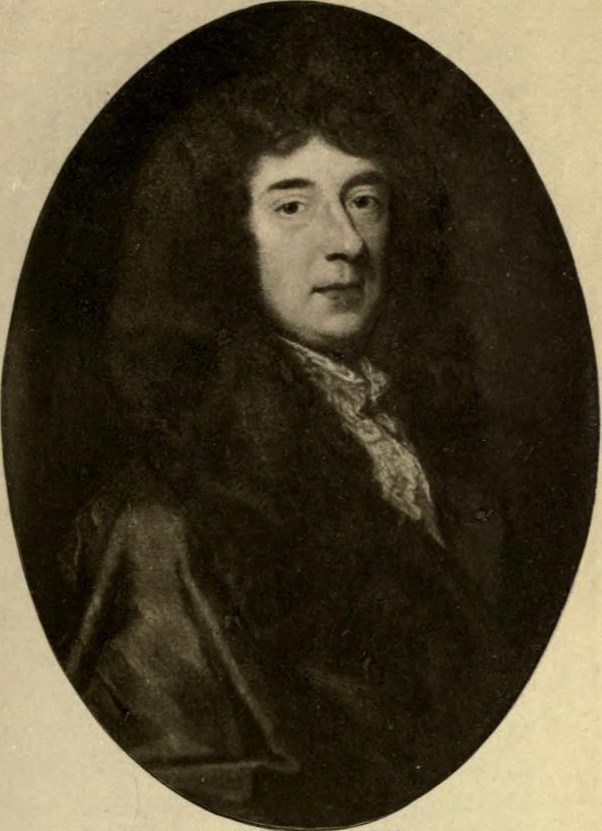
George Mackenzie of Rosehaugh, painting by Godfrey Kneller

=== Mackenzie era ===
The estates of Pittanochtie and Rosehaugh in the historical county of Ross-shire belonged to the Mackenzies, the dominant clan in the Easter Ross region. A house with an L-shaped floor plan and modest dimensions is documented there from 1662. In the late 1660s, George Mackenzie, a native of Dundee, acquired the property. He was the son of Simon Mackenzie of Lochslin Castle and cousin of Kenneth Mackenzie, 3rd Earl of Seaforth. The Earls of Seaforth were one of the four most influential noble lines in the Highlands at that time, alongside the Dukes of Argyll, Atholl, and Gordon. George Mackenzie was a prominent Scottish lawyer who served as Lord Advocate in 1677 and was a member of the Privy Council of Scotland, which advised the Scottish king. Mackenzie is known for his involvement in witch trials and the persecution of the Covenanters, a reformed movement that opposed the re-Catholicisation of Scotland under Charles II. This earned him the nickname "Bloody Mackenzie". His book, Laws and Customs of Scotland in Matters Criminal, is considered the first book on Scottish criminal law. Upon being knighted in 1674, George Mackenzie chose the name Sir George Mackenzie of Rosehaugh. In 1688, just three years before his death, George Mackenzie sold the Pittanochtie estate to Kenneth Mackenzie, a politician who was later made a baronet in 1702/3. Despite this sale, Rosehaugh continued to employ George Mackenzie for his heirs.

Rosehaugh was inherited by the Mackenzie baronets. The estate was eventually sold to George Ross of Pitkerrie. The first steps in the development of the estate's landscape appear to date from around this time. Roderick Mackenzie, the 4th Baronet, reunited Rosehaugh and Pittanochtie. He had the first documented manor house built there in 1798, which he called Rosehaugh House. The newer house was constructed above the older one, providing an additional panoramic view of the grounds. According to an estimate, it cost between £3000 and £4000 to build. In 1811, Roderick Mackenzie's second son, James Wemyss Mackenzie, 5th Baronet, inherited the estate. Through his marriage to Henrietta of Suddie, who was set to inherit the neighbouring Suddie estate to the west, Rosehaugh was expanded. James Mackenzie developed the estate by constructing a farmhouse and other agricultural buildings in the 1810s. In 1820, construction of the state road section between Munlochy and Avoch (now the A832) progressed. The road cut through the estate, prompting a complete redesign of the main driveway, which was then oriented southwest towards the new road.

Far-reaching developments began under James John Randoll Mackenzie, 6th Baronet, who inherited Rosehaugh on the death of his father in 1843. He significantly extended the manor house and the estate and commissioned Edinburgh-based landscape architect C.H.J. Smith to develop the gardens. Various outbuildings and quarters for the estate servants were also constructed, and Smith designed terraced gardens that extend down the slope to the south of the manor house. The 2.4 hectare gardens to the southeast of Rosehaugh House were created between 1844 and 1850, although Smith's design was not realised. During this phase, other areas of the estate were also formalised, and paths were laid out. By 1850, the estate had seven gates for access. In the 1850s, Mackenzie was able to service his ongoing loans through the sale of land. However, he became insolvent in 1862 and left Scotland for France, where he died in 1884. During the era of the Mackenzie lairds, Donald Cameron, a bagpiper, composed the Rosehaugh House march.

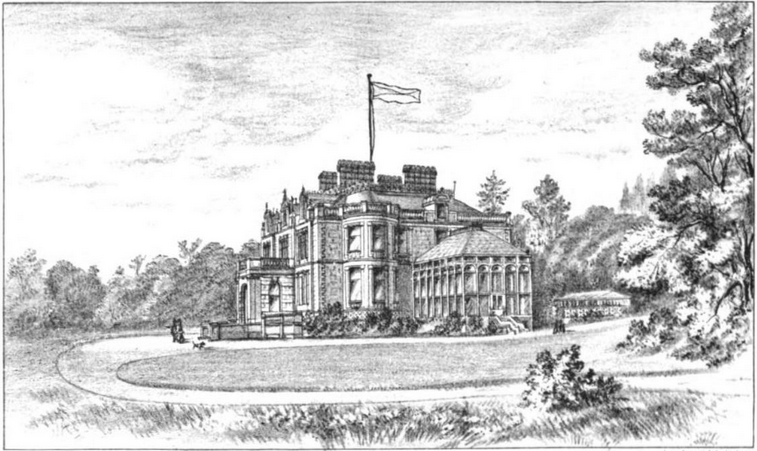
Rosehaugh House, circa 1885

=== Fletcher era ===
Following Mackenzie's bankruptcy, James Fletcher purchased the 25.9 square kilometres of Rosehaugh for £145,000. Despite being born and raised in Elgin, Moray, Fletcher's family hailed from Avoch. Fletcher amassed his wealth as a merchant in Liverpool, where he established the import firm Jack Bros. with his brother. The company was among the largest British organisations in maritime trade with Peru. Fletcher personally managed the branch in Arequipa, Peru, until 1845. The trade goods that were most important to the region included wool from llamas, alpacas, and vicuñas, which was necessary for the textile industry. Fletcher rapidly expanded Rosehaugh's area to 42.9 km^{2} through acquisitions. In addition to his duties as a company director, Fletcher managed two agricultural estates in Forfarshire and invested in mines and railway companies. However, he devoted a significant amount of energy to further developing Rosehaugh. The focus of Fletcher's efforts was on restructuring the estate's agriculture and reclaiming previously unused land. To achieve this, he had 1335 hectares of fallow land ploughed and further areas developed by draining moors. Further on, he drained Loch Scadden near Avoch, covering 24 hectares, by creating a system of 4.5-metre-deep canals. To structure the activities in the growing areas, the farms were bundled into organizational units, each farming 400 to 600 hectares. The central estate managed an area of around 2000 hectares. Alexander Ross, a prominent Highland architect, was entrusted by Fletcher with the structural development of Rosehaugh, which included the extension and remodelling of Rosehaugh House, as well as the construction and revision of numerous external buildings. The terraces on the south side and the adjoining greenhouses to the east were constructed during this period. The precise extent of Ross's contribution is uncertain.

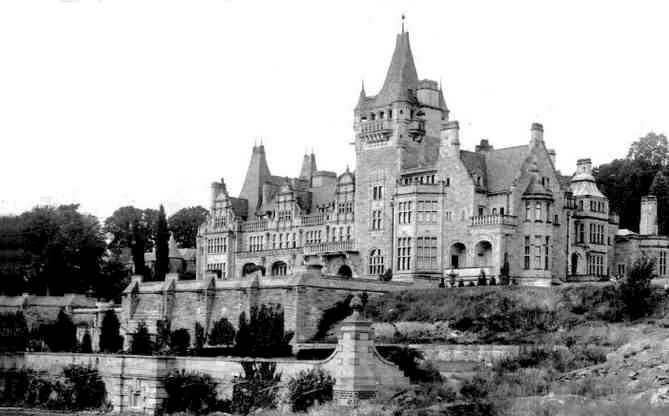
East view, around 1910

In 1885, James Fletcher died, leaving his possessions and a large sum of money to James Douglas Fletcher. The latter was involved in the tea and rubber trade in Ceylon, where he managed plantations covering 11.8 km^{2} and 4.1 km^{2} respectively. Fletcher's Rosehaugh Tea & Rubber Company was acquired in 1978 and operated as a property developer, Rosehaugh, in London before being wound up in 1992. It was during his tenure that the estate underwent its most significant developments. By 1903, Fletcher had spent approximately £250,000 on Rosehaugh House, making it the most expensive private building project in the UK at the time. The architect William Flockhart from Glasgow, who operated his office in London, was commissioned for the planning. The project involved constructing an artificial lake with an island, damming the Killen Burn (which required relocating several families), and redirecting the water to flow over a cascading waterfall (known as Horseshoe Falls) to generate electricity. Additionally, extensive greenhouses were installed, and terraced gardens were created to the south of the manor house. By 1893, the interior of Rosehaugh House had been modernised. After Flockhart completed his work, Fletcher commissioned the architect to carry out another substantial extension to the manor house. This extension was carried out between 1898 and 1903. Stylistically, Rosehaugh House, which was largely designed by Ross, did not correspond in any way to Flockhart's work. During the extension, it was decided to carry out a comprehensive overhaul in the French Neo-Renaissance style. Since 1885, citizens have had the right to access the estate and hold events there. Additionally, Avoch benefited from the developments at Rosehaugh House, including the installation of water pipes and sewers, which greatly improved the village's hygienic conditions. Fletcher also had buildings erected for the residents and was involved in local sports and church decision-making bodies.

=== Fletcher's heirs ===
James Douglas Fletcher died in 1927 without any descendants. His widow, Lilian Maud Stephen, inherited the estate. She commissioned the renowned architect Edwin Lutyens to create a monumental tomb and memorial for her late husband. In 1943, she put Rosehaugh up for sale but then took it off the market again. After Stephen died in 1953, the estate passed to her niece, Shaw-Mackenzie of Newhall, who sold it the following year. Previously, she donated various items from the interior and exterior to museums. The acquiring Eagle Star Insurance Co.'s main interest was Rosehaugh's farmland, which they wanted to continue to operate commercially or sell as parcelled land. At the time, considerable sums would have had to be invested to maintain the manor house. The clay tile roofing, which was not sufficiently resistant to the Scottish winters, instead of the usual slate roofing, would have been a significant and costly element of restoration. The manor house was demolished in 1959 as no buyer was found and the owners had no interest in preserving it. Before the demolition, an on-site auction was held to sell the inventory and items from the exterior of the property. The auction, organised by Thomas Love and Sons from Perth, was the largest ever held on the Black Isle. The items for sale included "valuable English, Continental, Eastern and other furniture and furnishings". Interior details, such as stucco ornaments and library shelves, were transferred to Novar House. Today, a modern villa stands on the site.

Broadland Properties Ltd currently owns Rosehaugh with the aim of converting the preserved buildings into living, office, and retail space, as well as a kindergarten. The local population has been using the parkland for recreational purposes for years. Several outbuildings have been restored and are now rented out as private or holiday houses. In 2022, the local council approved the separation of 39 plots of land near Avoch for residential development.

== Manor house ==
The manor house is situated 2.5 kilometres northwest of Avoch and 5 kilometres west of the harbour town of Fortrose. Inverness, known as the capital of the Highlands, is located 10 kilometres to the south. To the east, Rosehaugh once bordered the Avoch House estate, which was destroyed by a fire in 1833. The neo-Renaissance building exemplifies the magnificent architecture of the late Victorian era, with opulent and high-quality interior design that has been highly praised.

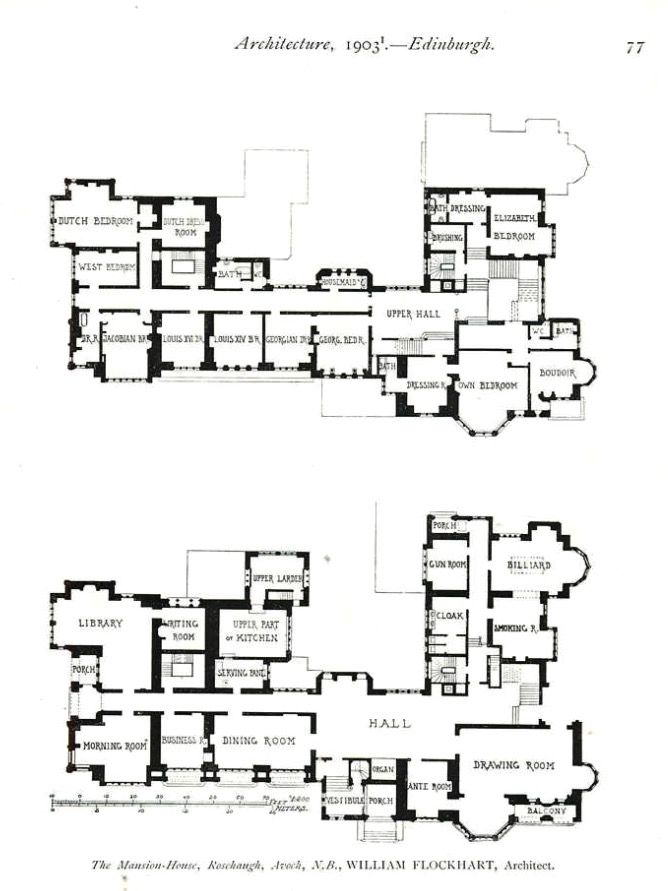
Floor plan 1903

The literature only provides fragmentary descriptions of the architectural details of Flockart's Rosehaugh House. Flockart presented his designs to the Royal Academy of Arts after finalising the plans. The mansion was later featured in the trade journal The British Architect, despite being only an extension and reworking of an existing building. Despite this, the scale of Flockhart's commission was equivalent to that of a new building. The construction costs for the manor house itself amounted to around £60,000. S. D. Adshead was initially in charge of the work on site. However, he was replaced in 1901 by Flockhart's son-in-law, Leonard Rome Guthrie, who later achieved some prominence as an architect. Foster and Dicksee from Rugby, England, carried out the building work. Rosehaugh House is considered Flockhart's most extensive work.

The masonry consists of red sandstone blocks from a nearby quarry, while the grey granite used for accentuation was quarried on the estate. The building features numerous towers and balconies, including a striking main tower on the south façade topped with a leaden weather vane depicting a 1.8-metre long galleon with billowing sails.

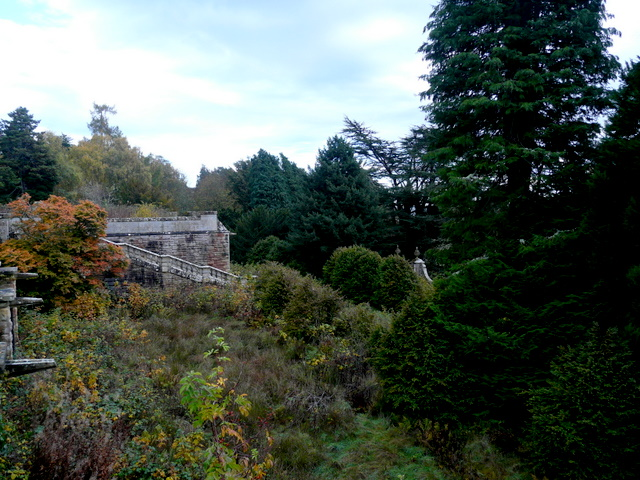
Retaining wall of the terrace

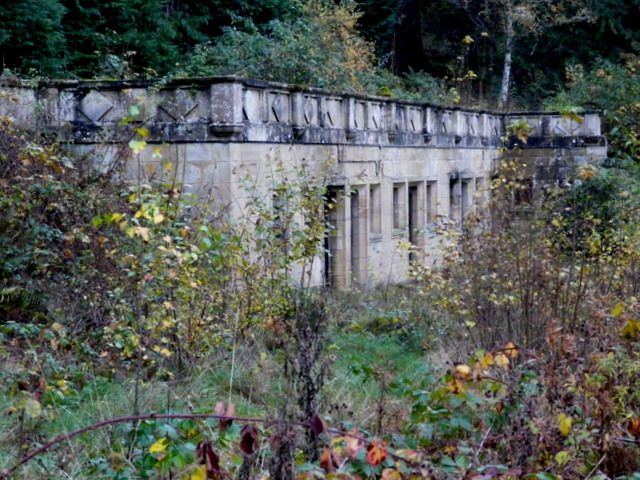
The former wine cellar

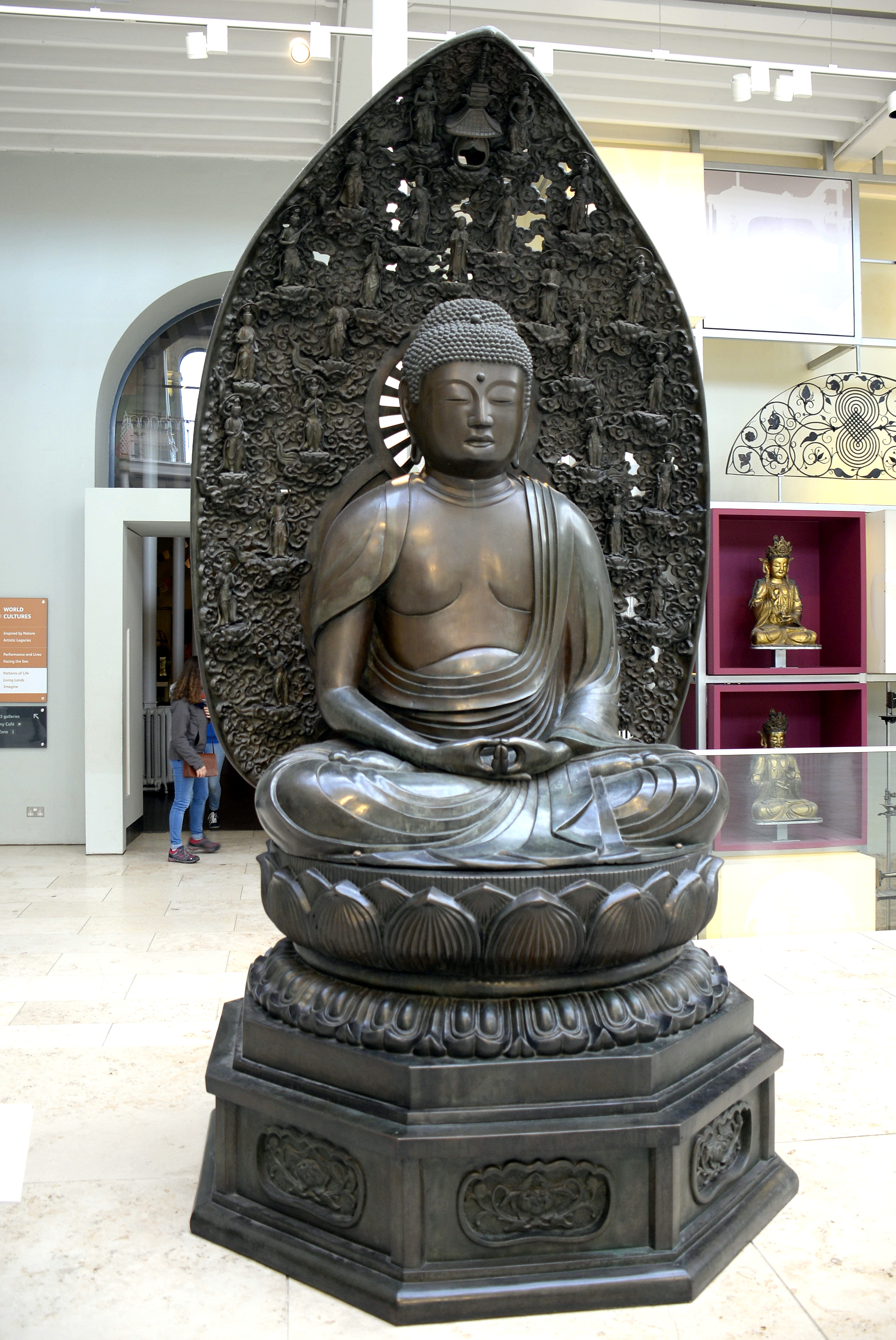
Japanese Buddha statue from Rosehaugh House, 1st half of the 19th century, National Museum of Scotland

During Flockhart's extensive work, only high-quality building materials were used. The ground floor was renovated to include a new vestibule, smoking room, and billiard parlour. In the basement, a bathing area was created under a blue dome, lined with blue Persian tiles, and featuring a heated swimming pool, Victorian Turkish baths, and an Italian drinking fountain. The interior of Rosehaugh House is characterized by mahogany and teak woodwork. The door frames and open fireplaces were ornate. An early central heating system was installed to control the temperature. It had a coal burner that heated the air, which was then blown into the various rooms through grilled outlets. The system consumed up to one tonne of coal per day. The manor house employed 28 servants to maintain operations, with additional labourers working in the estate's outdoor areas. The only remaining structure that was directly connected to Rosehaugh House is the former wine cellar (located at 57°34′21″N 4°12′42.2″W) which is now marked by the retaining wall on the slope of the terrace. This Tudor-Gothic building, dating from the late 19th century, is constructed into the hillside north of the manor house in the style of an ice cellar. Its masonry is made of polished ashlars, which also form the diamond-ornamented parapet of the flat roof. The five oak exterior doors are ornamented with St Andrew's crosses in the style of the Arts and Crafts movement.

== Gardens and parks ==
The gardens and parks at Rosehaugh suggest that George Mackenzie had driveways and service roads constructed around the manor house. However, there are few records of Rosehaugh's 17th and 18th century parks. James Fletcher was responsible for their extensive formalisation and further development. Ultimately, Rosehaugh House was surrounded by an elaborate landscape of formalised gardens and essentially wooded parkland. The regional natural environment is significantly enhanced by these features, which are a striking aspect of it. Historic Scotland has categorised Rosehaugh as an estate of outstanding landscape interest, reflecting this. The property is enclosed by a wall on three sides, with only the north side excluded, which is closed off topographically and by the moorland landscape of Shannon Wood. The formalised areas mainly extend to the south and north-west of the former manor house site. The downslope areas to the south are partly structured by stepping and terracing. The parks consist of various species, some natural and some afforested. The increasing diversity of species near Rosehaugh House is striking.

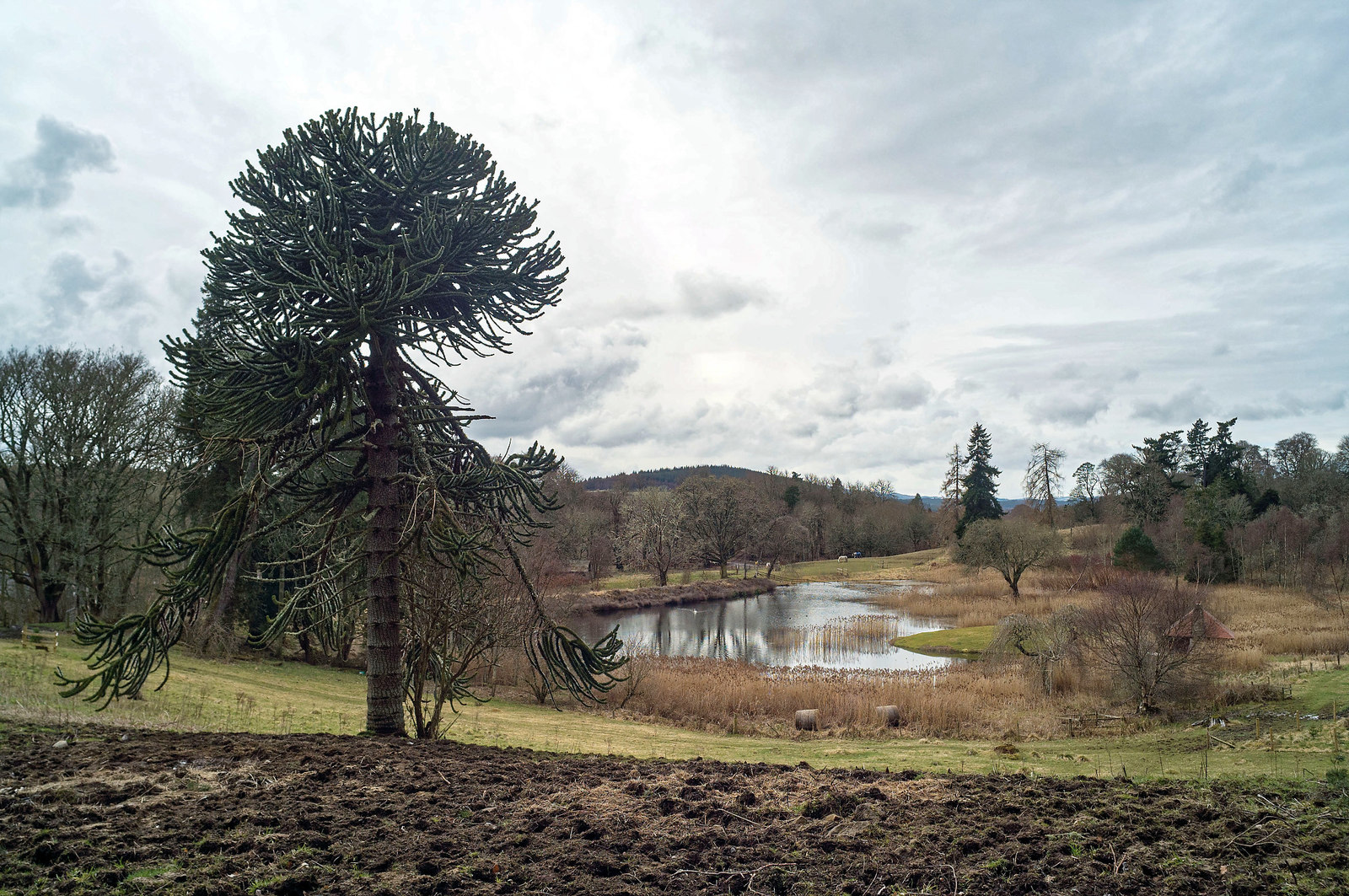
Artificial lake, partly overgrown with reeds

The ornamental centrepiece of the complex is an artificial lake of 2.4 hectares in the southern part, the surface of which is now reduced by the growth of reeds (position: 57°34′14.1″N 4°12′32.9″W). Its boathouse, built around 1900 (location: 57°34′15.3″N 4°12′32.2″W), has since been restored. Wood panelling covers much of the fieldstone masonry.The former pantiled roof is now covered with flat tiles. The fireplace and interior panelling survive. It is not known who designed the boathouse. However, it dates from Flockart's time. Another boathouse (West Lake Boathouse or Duck Lake Boathouse), also built around 1900, stands on the reservoir south-west of Rosehaugh House (location: 57°34′14″N 4°13′10.8″W). Its fieldstone walls are also largely timber-framed. The lounge on the upper floor has a wooden balcony on supporting beams extending along three sides. In the early 21st century the building, which had fallen into disrepair, was restored, extended and converted for residential use. The cross-gable added during this process is in keeping with the original style. The lake created by damming the Killen Burn was mainly used for hydroelectric power generation. The former generator house, which supplied electricity to the estate, is located below (at 57°34′10.1″N 4°12′58.2″W). After a dam burst in 1945 or 1946, the height of the dam and the area of the lake were reduced, which is reflected in the elevated position of the boathouse, which once stood directly on the lakeshore. Stylistic details suggest that Flockhart did not design the generator house, which was built around 1900. It has a roughly L-shaped floor plan. Polished and rusticated details contrast with the bossaged natural stone masonry. Various openings are closed by Tudor arches. Ventilation openings have been incorporated into the pyramidal roof of the southern arm. Water from the reservoir was channelled underground beneath the generator house, which has been converted into a holiday home as part of the restoration.

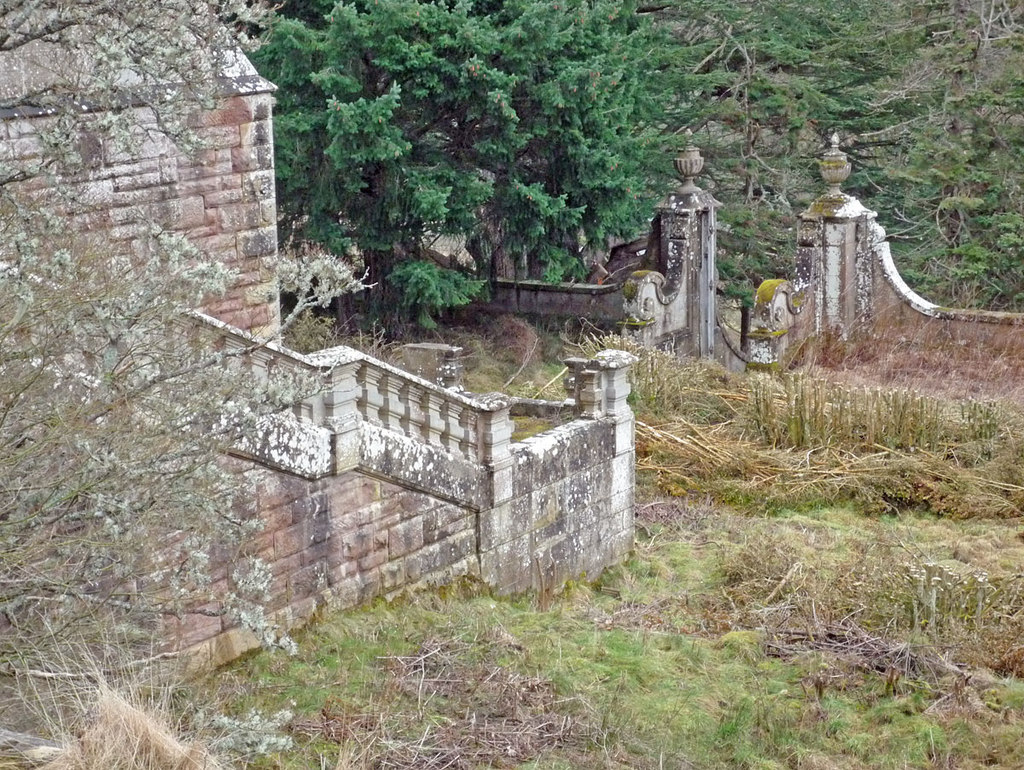
Access to the gardens

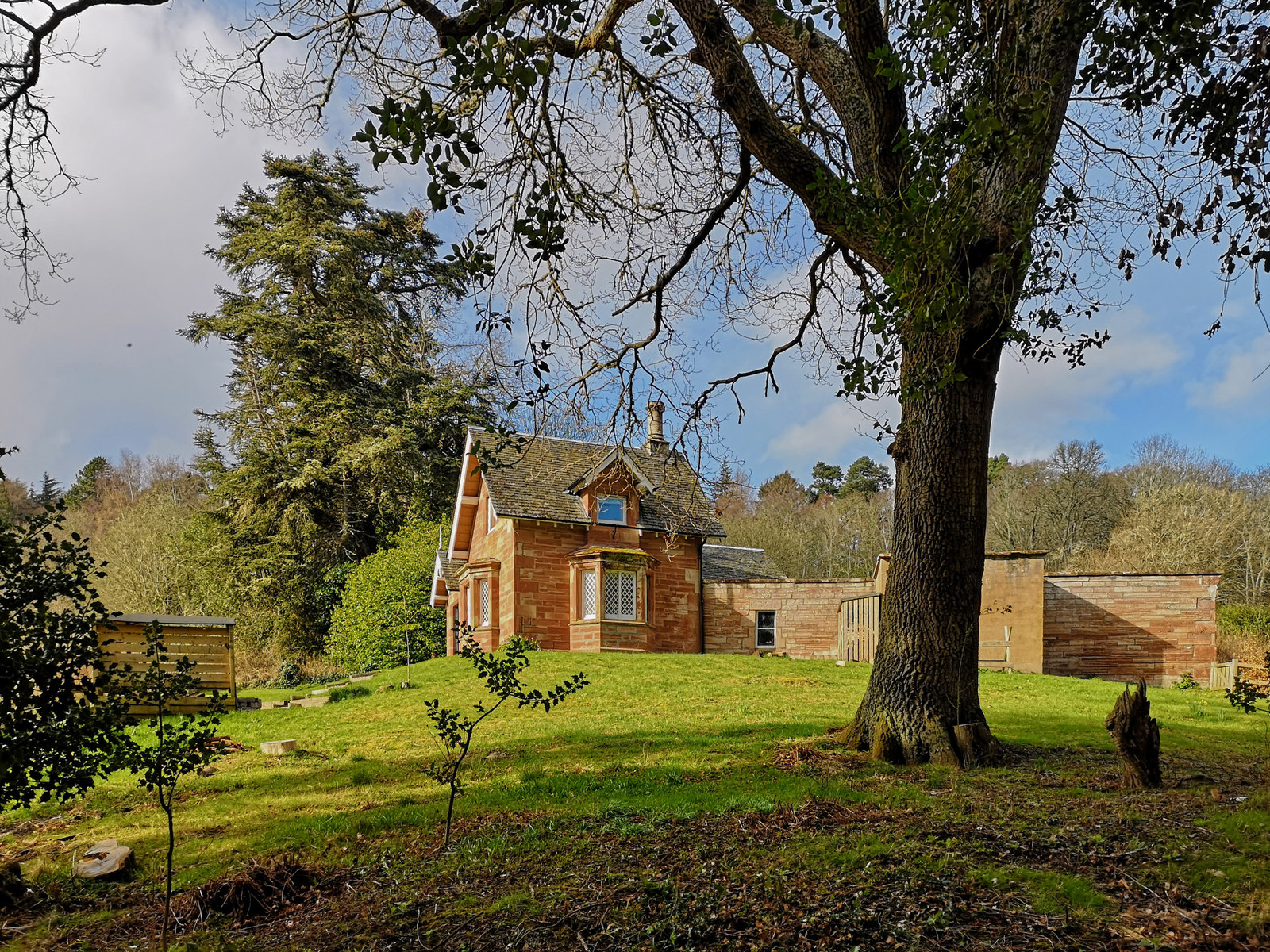
Gardener's house

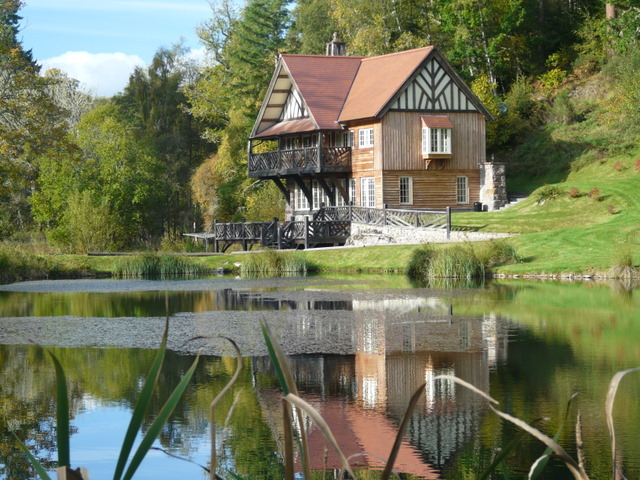
North shore of the reservoir with the Duck Lake Boathouse

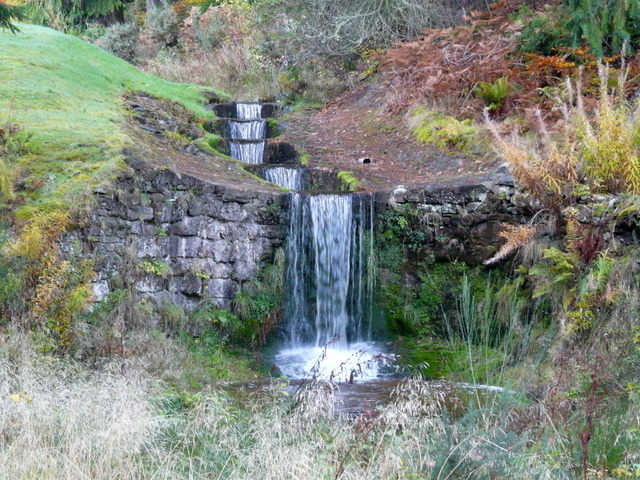
Ornamental waterfall at the Killen Burn

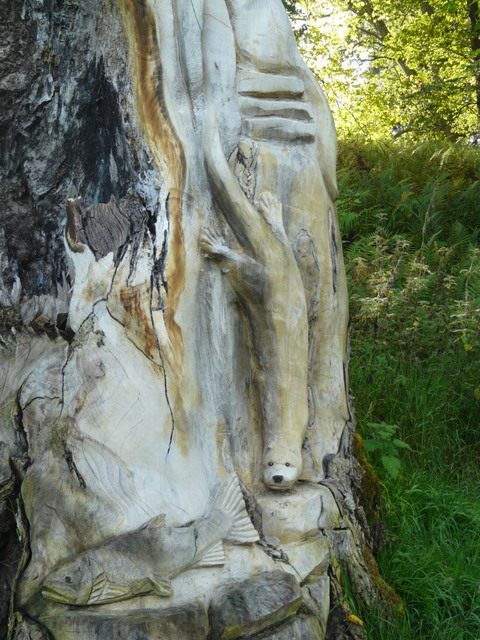
Tree stump with decorative carving

In the 1840s, James John Randoll Mackenzie had gardens laid out to the south-east of Rosehaugh House. Later, they were redesigned by Ross and Flockhart. The 2.4-hectare gardens are divided into two terraces. Ornamental gates are set into the surrounding quarry stone wall with concrete coping. The southern retaining wall seems to have been built in two phases. Flockhart provided supporting pillars and walled it up to a total height of three metres. The pilastered gates may have been decorated with old fragments from the manor house's remodelling. Photographs have preserved the layout of the gardens. A larger garden was situated to the east of the manor house, with heated greenhouses stretching along its entire northern wall (around 200 metres in length). A fernery, built during the end of the Pteridomania, was also included. The glasshouses' wooden framework was made of teak with bronze fittings, and the floors were decorated with mosaics. Mackenzie & Moncur, the manufacturer, used photographs of the greenhouses as representative models in its sales brochures. A row of cypress trees that once served as a hedge has been preserved at the southern end. The garden is now overgrown and provides little information about its former layout. A path separates the southern third, north of the dairy. The gardener's house, built around 1845 (location: 57°34′23.3″N 4°12′15.1″W), is situated to the east of the garden. The single-storey building is asymmetrically constructed with red stone blocks. The main entrance, located at an internal angle, has a simple bargeboard, just as the dormers, and a bevelled bay window protruding from the façade. An extension was later added on the southeast side, which has a slate roof.

== Pathways and infrastructure ==
A network of paths has been established over the centuries, connecting Rosehaugh House with various gates and outbuildings. The completion of the new state road (now the A832) in 1820 created a new main access route to the southwest. West Lodge, located off the road beyond the southwest gate, is approximately 1.3 kilometres south of Rosehaugh House (location: 57°33′41.8″N 4°13′5″W). The building was constructed in 1870 based on a design by Alexander Ross in the Italianate style. On the east side, there is a round-arched portal with an ornamental keystone on a projecting section. To the left of the portal, there are pilasters that flank a twin window with a baluster apron. The frieze below the corbels of the eaves cornice is decorated with triglyphs. The gable roof of the building is covered in slate. The gateway features four ornamented, urn-shaped pillars that border the central main path and the flanking pedestrian gates. Only the single-leaf flanking cast iron gates have survived. Fences on both sides are continued on low walls, corresponding to the design of the gates. To the west of the manor house, the path crosses the Killen Burn via a single-arch bridge (at 57°34′7.9″N 4°12′37.9″W). The fieldstone parapet of the building features polished natural stone details that curve on both sides. Additionally, the spandrels are rusticated.

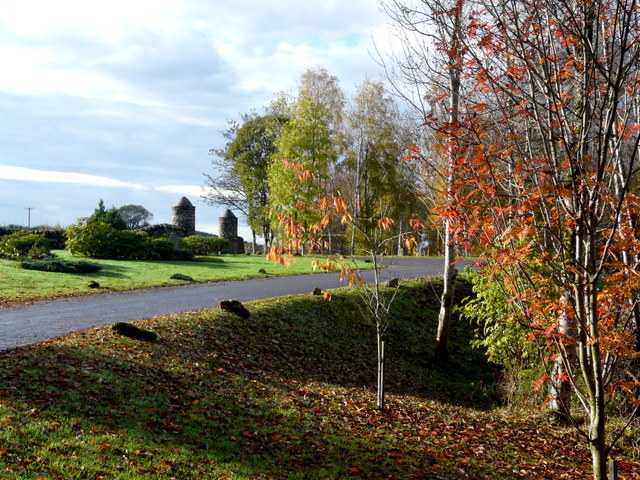
Main path with gate near the A832 motorway

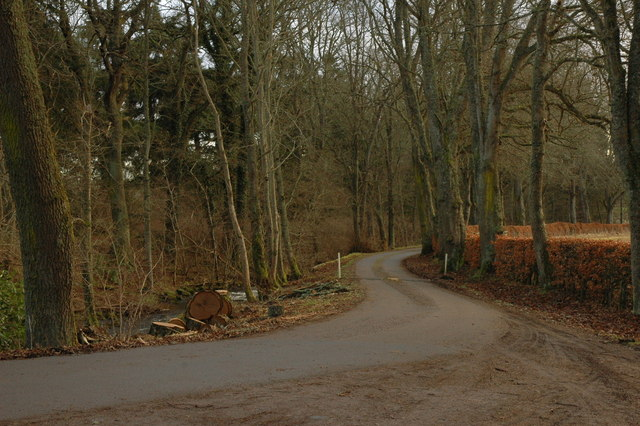
Main path near the crossing of the Killen Burn

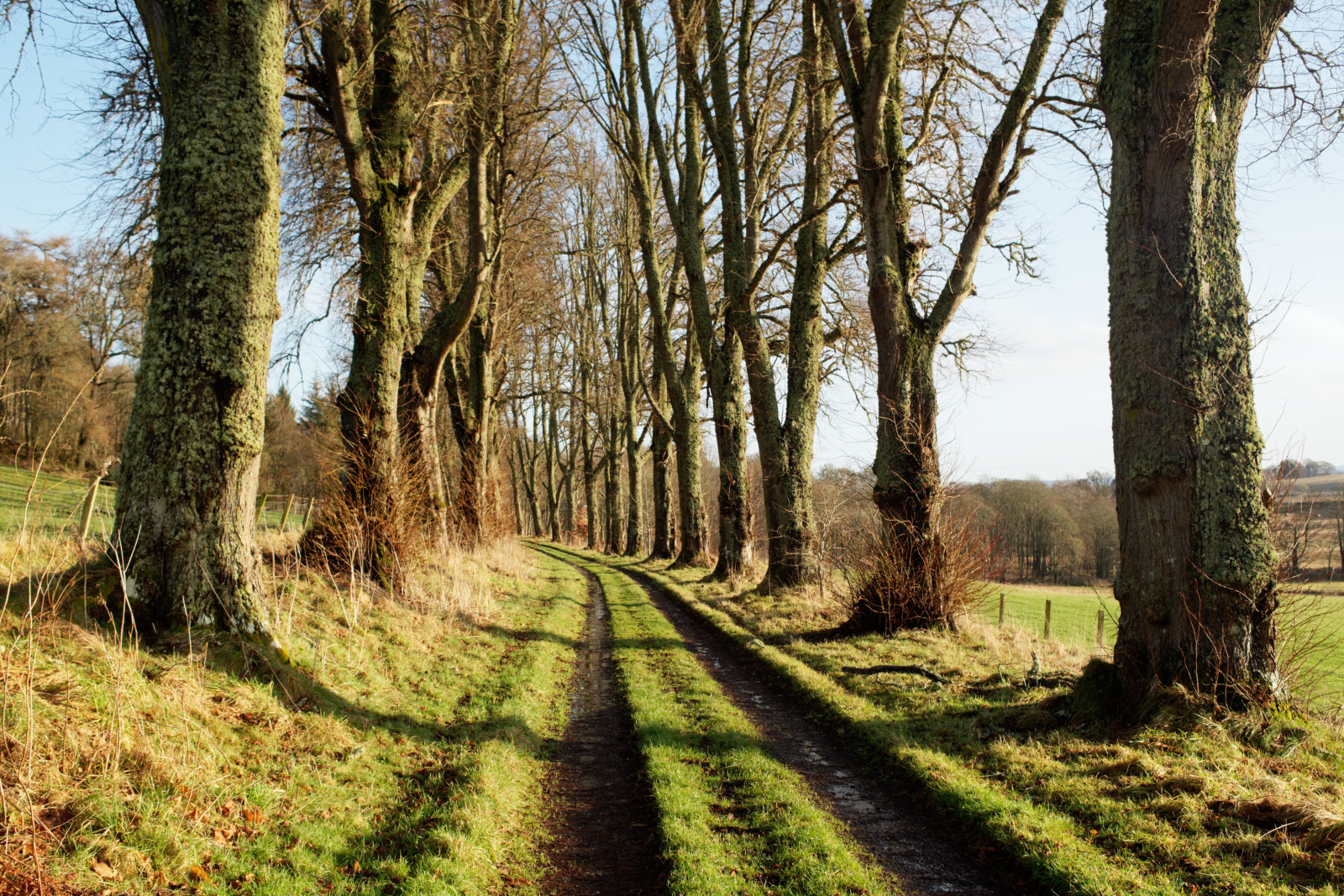
Section of the more southerly of the two east–west connections

The estate's infrastructure relies heavily on two main paths that run east–west. One path runs between the lake and the manor house, while the other passes the southern flank of the former manor house via the burnt-down Avoch House. Both paths end at Avoch. Due to acquisitions on the eastern flank, the east gate with East Lodge had to be relocated in 1871 to mark the new outer boundary of the estate. The new location was along the more southerly of the two paths (current location: 57°34′20.9″N 4°11′22.4″W). Alexander Ross planned the East Lodge, which was built in 1873 and remodelled by him three years later. On the more northerly path, Burnthouse (location: 57°34′23.2″N 4°10′59.4″W) stands out as a special feature. It was originally a wing of Avoch House, specifically the early 19th century farm wing that survived the devastating fire. The two-storey, three-axis wide building with corner risalits has harling plastered facades. To the right, a segmental arched gateway leads to the somewhat younger house behind it. The path crosses a water-bearing ditch near the gardener's house. The bridge (location: 57°34′22.1″N 4°12′9.9″W), which has a single arch, was constructed in the late 19th century and was later reworked by Alexander Ross in 1876 as part of the relocation of East Lodge. A decorative band surrounds the bridge's segmental brick arch, and its parapets curve outwards on both sides.

James Douglas Fletcher was the director of the Highland Railway for several years. During this period, a private halt was built along the branch line between Muir of Ord and Fortrose, located on the north side of the line to the south-west of Rosehaugh House. Passenger services on this line ceased in 1951, and freight services stopped in 1960.

== Agriculture and livestock ==
During the Mackenzie era, Rosehaugh had agricultural and livestock facilities that were typical for the region. In 1871, under James Fletcher's management, but before the significant expansion of agricultural activities, Rosehaugh House farmed 356 acres, generating £105 in revenue. James Douglas Fletcher reorganised and significantly expanded the economic activities, pursuing a subsistence farming approach to make the estate self-sufficient in all the food it needed. He furthered the development of farming methods and introduced non-native crops and livestock breeds. He also secured Rosehaugh's electricity supply by using water power. King George V's favourite horse, the highland pony Jock from Fletcher's stud, accompanied the royal coffin during his funeral procession. Rosehaugh's agriculture was recently valued highly. Eagle Star Insurance Co. purchased it, mainly for the agricultural facilities.

=== Farmstead ===
The former farmstead is located near the bridge over the Killen Burn and the artificial lake, off the southern main road (coordinates: 57°34′9.4″N 4°12′24″W). around 1811. It was extended in the 1830s and 1840s, but unfortunately, a devastating fire in the 1960s destroyed most of the neoclassical complex, leaving only the eastern part preserved. Although it is not a listed building, it is included in the Buildings at Risk register. The former farmhouse was classified as being in poor condition and at moderate risk in 2013. In addition to living quarters, it had separate stable areas for horses, pigs, and dairy cows, as well as lamb rearing facilities. The complex also included general storage areas, feed barns, an engine house, and a heavy-duty weighbridge. The estate's gable roofs are covered with corrugated iron.

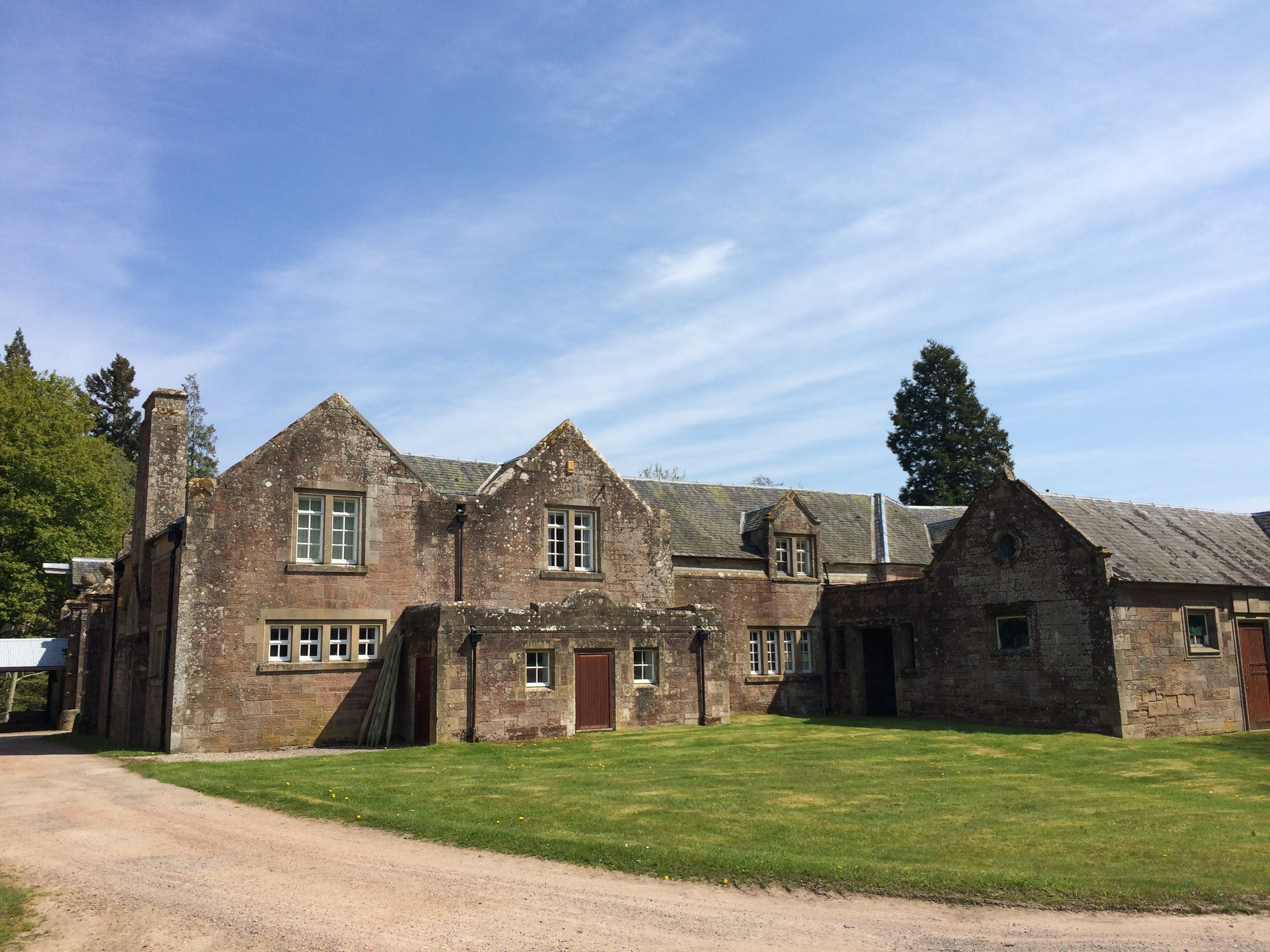
The stables viewed from the west

=== Stables ===
The first stables on the estate, located a short distance to the west of Rosehaugh House, were probably built around 1810 by James Wemyss Mackenzie (location: 57°34′20.2″N 4°12′48.9″W). Over the following decades, they were extended and remodelled several times. In the mid-19th century, James John Randoll Mackenzie commissioned a significant extension to the complex. Another extension was carried out in 1874 according to plans by Alexander Ross. A modernisation was also carried out, last revised by Flockhart around 1900. Under Mackenzie, a U-shaped complex was created, with elongated buildings enclosing an inner courtyard on three sides, while the north-west facing front remained open. Today, only the eastern wing dates from this construction phase, while the western and northern parts of the building and the external western extension were either completed in 1874 or massively reworked. The complex now houses a series of workshops.

The buildings' brickwork is made up of uneven reddish stone blocks with polished surrounds and cornerstones. The newer side walls have various domed windows with stone mullions, while some of the older window openings on the eastern side have been closed with quarry stone masonry. On the south side, a risalit with a cross gable emerges from the seven-axis wide, but asymmetrically constructed structure, which ends on the right with a round tower with a conical roof. The northern flank of the building features a slate roof with dormers and a large chimney. The ornamentation includes motifs from the Arts and Crafts movement, which originated from Flockhart's reworking. The inner courtyard is covered by a modern roof.

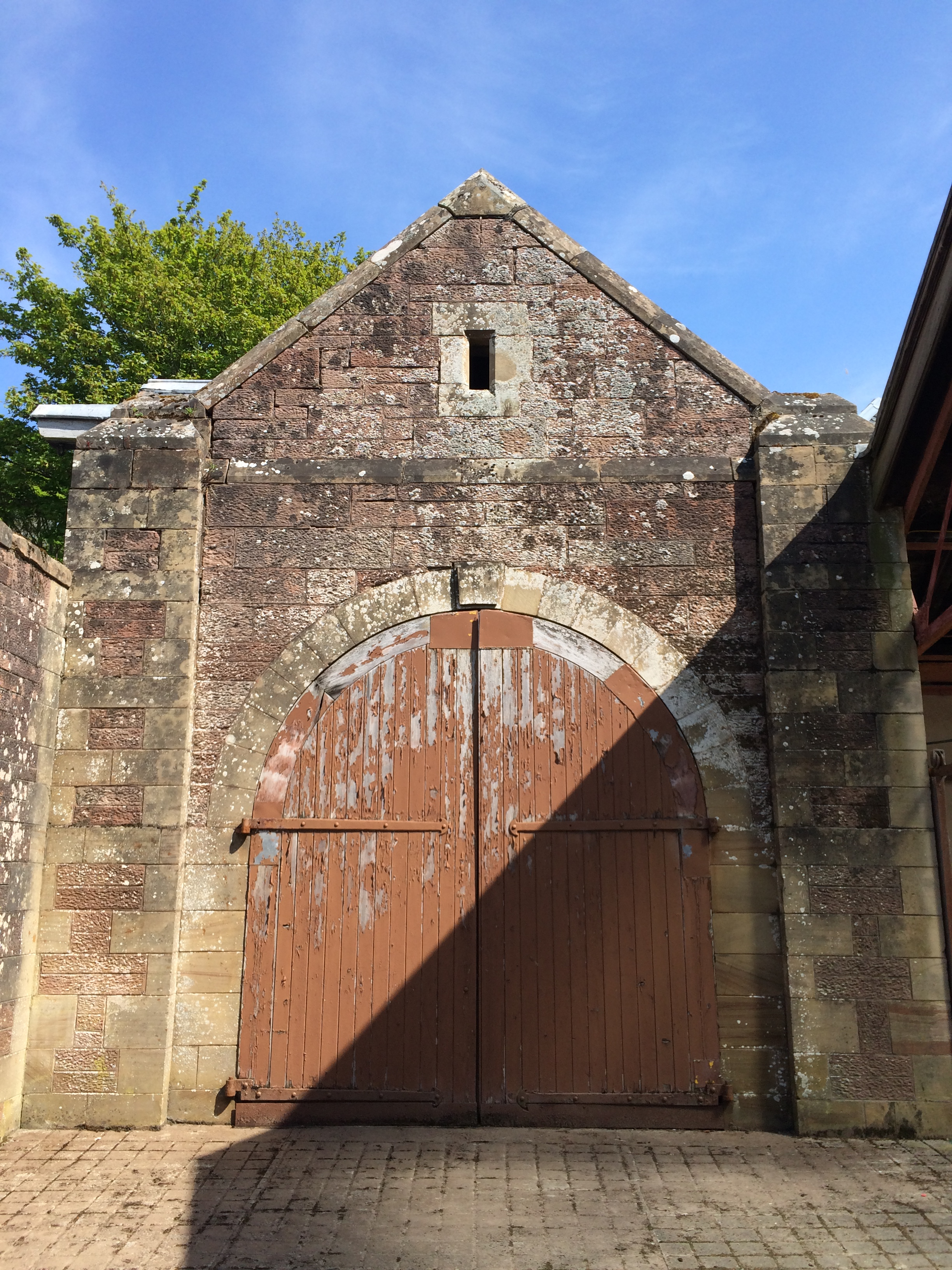
Gate on the west side

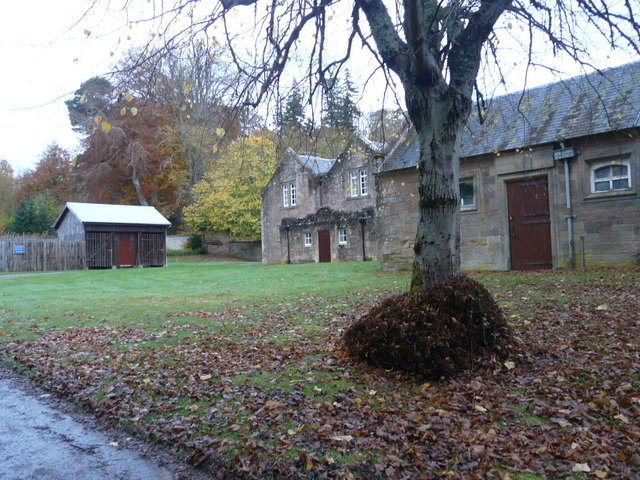
On the right, the external building on the west side

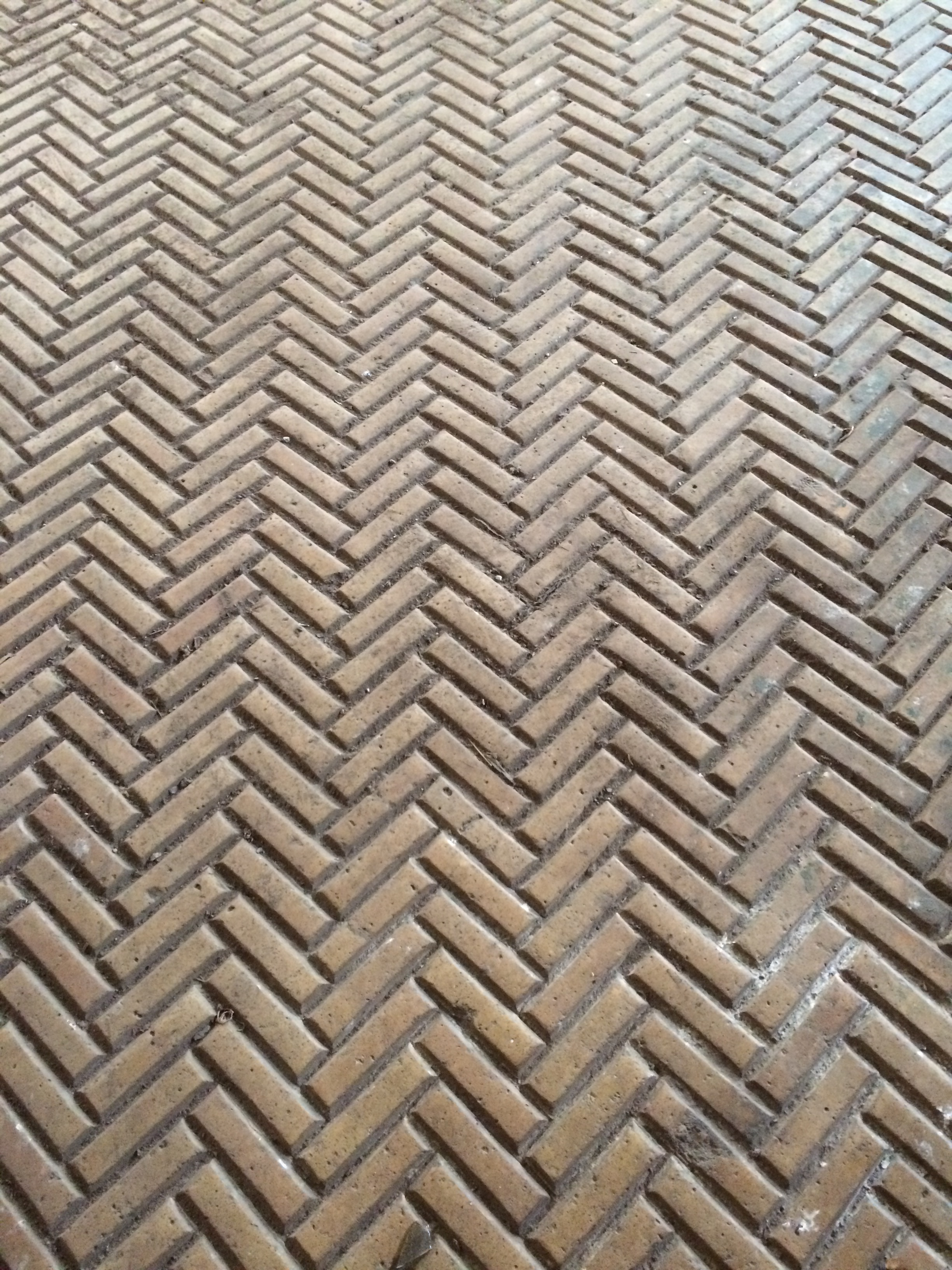
Floor of the stables

The farmstead features a single-storey cottage from the mid-19th century, located south of the complex (position: 57°34′19.2″N 4°12′48.9″W). The south-facing main façade has three axes, with quatrefoils on either side of the central recessed entrance door. An unadorned cornice tops the entrance, resembling the architrave of an entablature. There were originally twelve-lite windows, but only partial remnants remain. The hip roof is covered with slate.

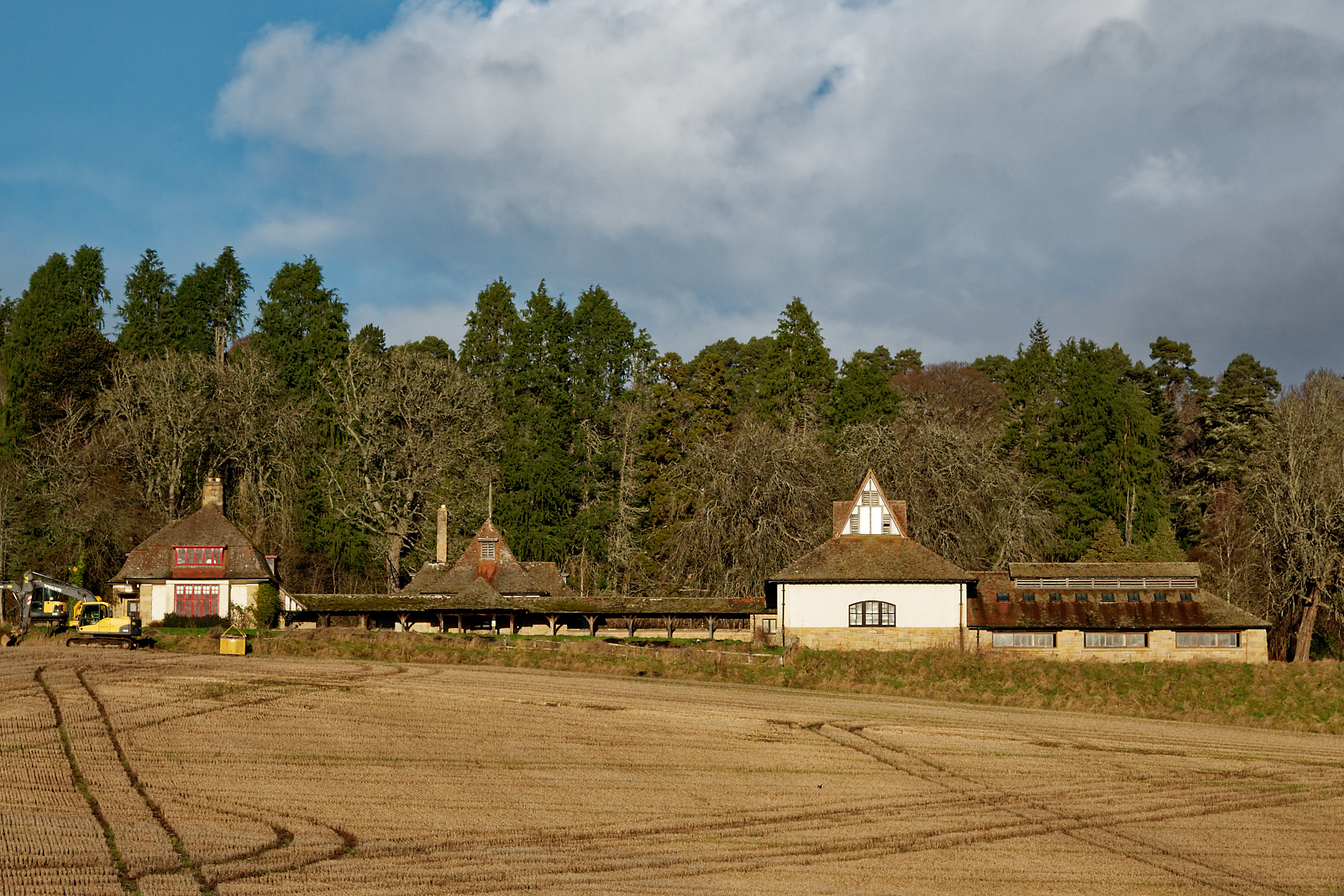
Panoramic view of the south side

=== The Dairy ===
The dairy is the most recent addition to Rosehaugh's buildings (located at 57°34′18.8″N 4°12′18.8″W). It was designed by Flockhart and constructed in 1907. The complex was solely dedicated to supplying the estate with dairy products and operated independently from the farmstead. The dairy had its own herd of Jersey cattle for milk production and carried out all steps involved in producing milk, butter, and cheese within the complex. During wartime, milk products were distributed to the population, although they were only intended to cover the needs of the estate. The dairy is the only building in Rosehaugh classified as a category A monument.

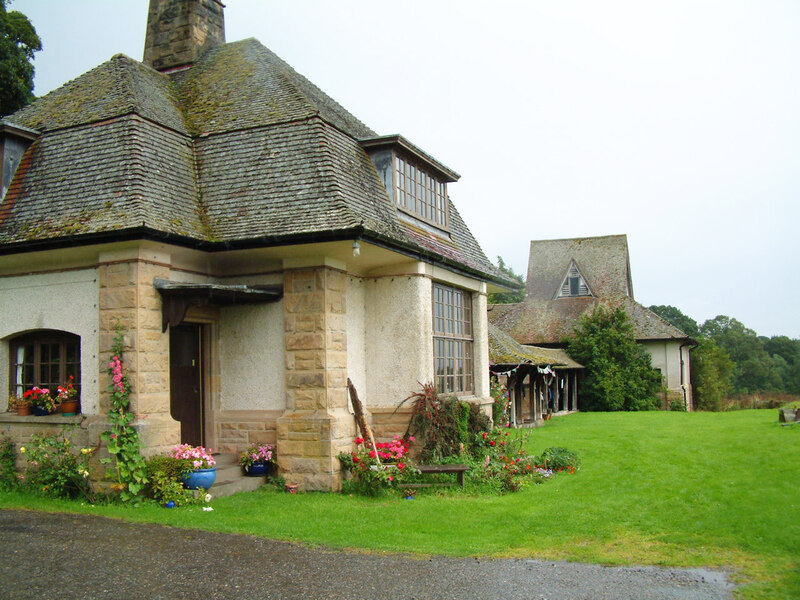
Close-up view from southwest

The complex is situated approximately 150 metres northeast of the lake, off the main road. The elongated building complex is designed in the spirit of the Arts and Crafts movement, featuring traditional architecture that is deliberately asymmetrical. It consists of one and two-story buildings that are subdivided into commercial and residential areas. Some of the building facades are harling plastered. The two cottages are connected by a colonnade of roughly hewn oak pillars, which is interrupted by a naïve portico. The plinths are designed with bossage work and the roofs are covered with red flat tiles.

== Further external structures ==
=== Gray's Cottage ===
Gray's Cottage (location: 57°34′25.5″N 4°12′52.4″W) is located approximately 200 metres north-west of the site of Rosehaugh House, north of the stables. It was built by Fletcher around 1900 as his servant's residence. The cottage is designed in the traditional English architectural style and decorated with Arts and Crafts motifs, by William Flockhart. The building has a striking flat tile and slate-covered gambrel roof with a wrought iron weather vane and a massive ridge chimney at the end of a flat cross gable. The eastern gable of the two-storey asymmetrically constructed building is adorned with a simple post-and-beam framework. The entrance door features a Tudor arch. The newer extensions at the rear of the building have been stylistically adapted to the existing architecture.

=== Kennels Cottage ===
Kennels Cottage is the residential building of the huntsman (located at 57°34′29.7″N 4°12′43.2″W). It was built in the mid-19th century during the time of James John Randoll Mackenzie and is situated approximately 250 metres north of Rosehaugh House, in the wooded northern half of the estate. The Tudor-Gothic cottage was rebuilt around 1900 and has a single-storey L-shaped floor plan with a mansard roof. The cottage's fieldstone masonry features offset natural stone surrounds. The main section of the cottage has a higher elevation and is topped with a curved, slate-covered hipped roof with large hipped dormers. A veranda spans the rear inner corner diagonally, which may have been added later. Additionally, there is an octagonal outer building that was used to mature the game.

=== The Laundry ===
The former laundry, designed in the Arts and Crafts style with a bossaged plinth, is located approximately 500 metres west of the site of Rosehaugh House (coordinates: 57°34′22.8″N 4°13′14.4″W). The Ordnance Survey map from 1905 confirms its earlier date. Built around 1900 according to a design by Flockhart, the single-storey building with a mansard floor is asymmetrically constructed. The building is distinguished by its projecting gablet roof with truss gables and segmental-arched barrel dormers, extending like a catslide roof over the front door, serving as a canopy. A weather vane rises between the blind miniature cross gables. There is a small extension with a hipped roof attached to the north side. The building has been restored and, like the former boathouse, is now rented out as a holiday home.

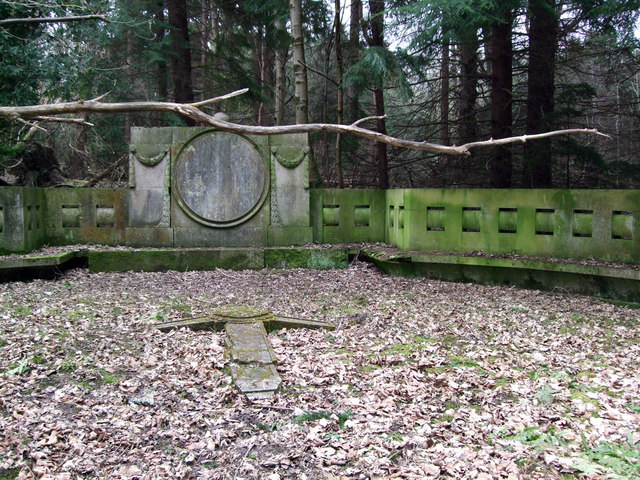
Fletcher Burial Enclosure

=== Fletcher Burial Enclosure ===
Following his death in 1927, Fletcher's widow commissioned the construction of a tomb for both of them. The British architect Edwin Lutyens was entrusted with the design. The site, located approximately 350 metres northeast of Rosehaugh House on the edge of the former gardens (position: 57°34′29.4″N 4°12′28.8″W), is considered to be the northernmost of Lutyens' surviving buildings in the British Isles. The monument comprises a circular area enclosed by an ornamented wall. The interior is surrounded by a large stone balustrade that supports a stone bench running the length of the ring. The gateway, which breaks through the ring, features simple stone pillars, a double-leaf gate, and a wrought-iron arch decorated with rose ornaments and the initials JD and LF. On the opposite side, the tomb monument consists of a simple stone block with laurel bands. The centre of the plaque features a large circle with the inscription "James Douglas Fletcher August 30, 1927 and Lilian Maud Augusta Stephen October 30, 1955".
