= George Mackenzie of Rosehaugh =

Scottish lawyer, Lord Advocate, essayist and legal writer

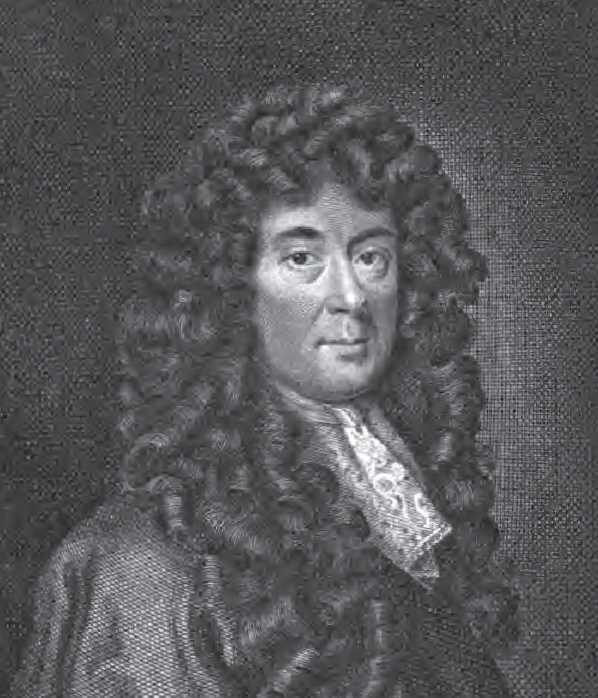
Sir George Mackenzie

Sir George Mackenzie of Rosehaugh (1636 – May 8, 1691) was a Scottish lawyer, Lord Advocate, essayist and legal writer. He was nicknamed Bloody Mackenzie.

== Early life ==
Mackenzie, who was born in Dundee, was the son of Sir Simon Mackenzie of Lochslin (died c. 1666) and Elizabeth Bruce, daughter of the Reverend Peter Bruce, minister of St Leonard's, and Principal of St Leonard's Hall in the University of St Andrews. He was a grandson of Kenneth, Lord Mackenzie of Kintail and a nephew of George Mackenzie, 2nd Earl of Seaforth.

He was educated at the King's College, University of Aberdeen (which he entered in 1650), the University of St Andrews, and the University of Bourges in France.

== Career ==
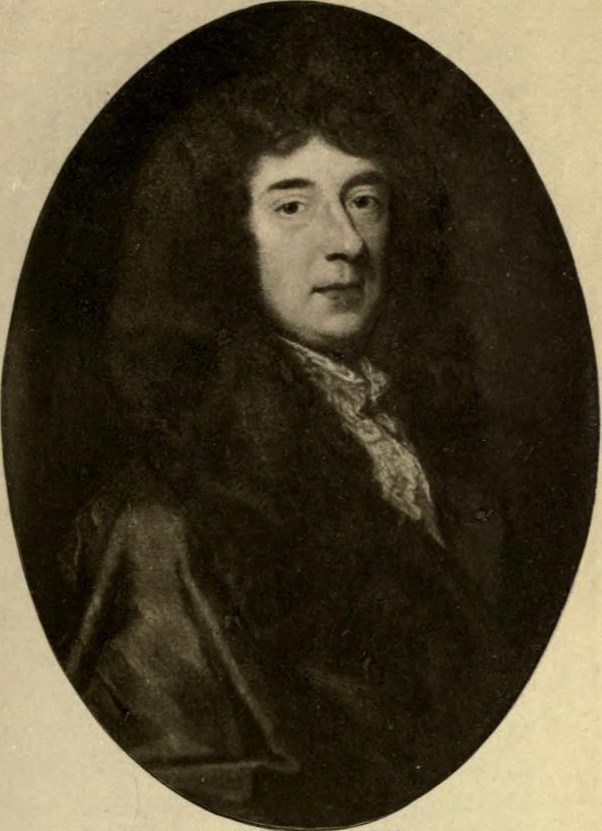
Sir George Mackenzie, by Sir Godfrey Kneller

Mackenzie was elected to the Faculty of Advocates in 1659, and spoke in defence at the trial of Archibald Campbell, Marquis of Argyll in 1661. He acted as justice-depute from 1661 to 1663, a post that involved him in extensive witch trials.

Mackenzie was knighted, and was a member of the Scottish Parliament for the County of Ross from 1669 to 1674. In 1677 he became Lord Advocate, and a member of the Privy Council of Scotland.

As Lord Advocate he was the minister responsible for the persecuting policy of Charles II in Scotland against the Presbyterian Covenanters. After the Battle of Bothwell Bridge in 1679 Mackenzie imprisoned up to 400 Covenanters in a field next to Greyfriars Kirkyard. Some were executed, and hundreds died of maltreatment. His treatment of Covenanters gained him the nickname "Bluidy Mackenzie". It has been argued that both he and Claverhouse kept to the letter of the law. It is unclear whether or not the epithet "Bluidy" is contemporary; it appears in The Heart of Midlothian (1818), given to Davie Deans. The language of blood prevails in the published testimony of Marion Harvey, hanged in 1681, who calls her blood onto Mackenzie: "that excommunicate tyrant, George Mackenzie, the advocate", among others.

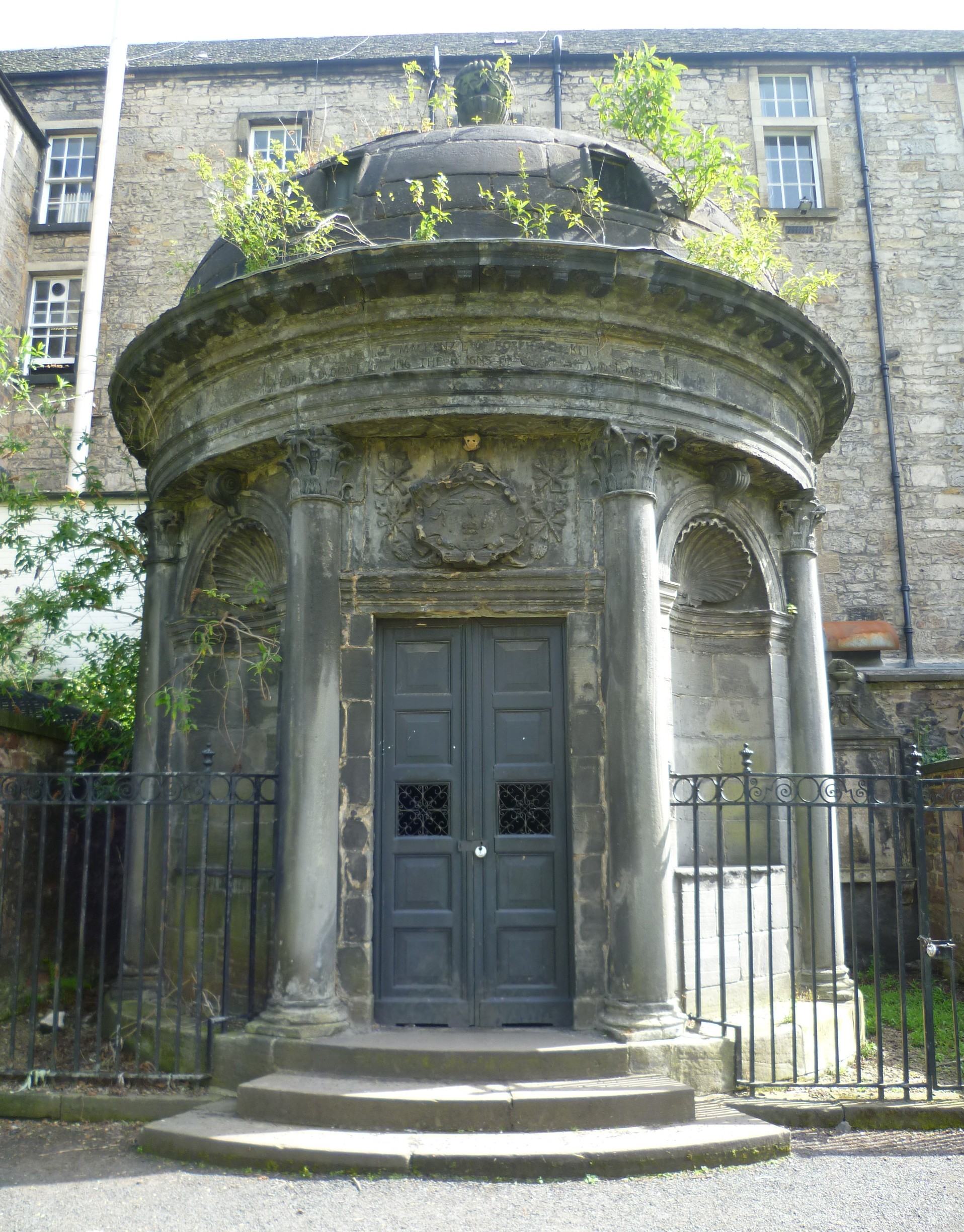
Mackenzie mausoleum in Greyfriars, Edinburgh

Mackenzie resigned for a short time in 1686, before taking up office again in 1688 and serving as shire commissioner for Forfarshire from 1688 to his death. He opposed the dethronement of James II, and to escape the consequences he retired from public life.

== Last years ==
For most of his middle life Mackenzie lived in a mansion on Rosehaugh Close (later called Melrose Close) off the Royal Mile and only a short distance from the Scottish Parliament and Law Courts.

Mackenzie retired at the Glorious Revolution to Oxford. In London on 9 March 1690 he dined with William Lloyd and John Evelyn, two literary opponents from the past. He died at Westminster on 8 May 1691 and is buried in Greyfriars Kirkyard in Edinburgh, his mausoleum being designed by James Smith.

== Works ==
In private life Mackenzie was a cultivated and learned gentleman with literary tendencies. He published in 1660 Aretina, which has been called the first Scottish novel. He is remembered as the author of various graceful essays. A contemporary antiquarian, Alexander Nisbet, calls him "learned" and "renowned".

Mackenzie wrote legal, political, and antiquarian books, including:

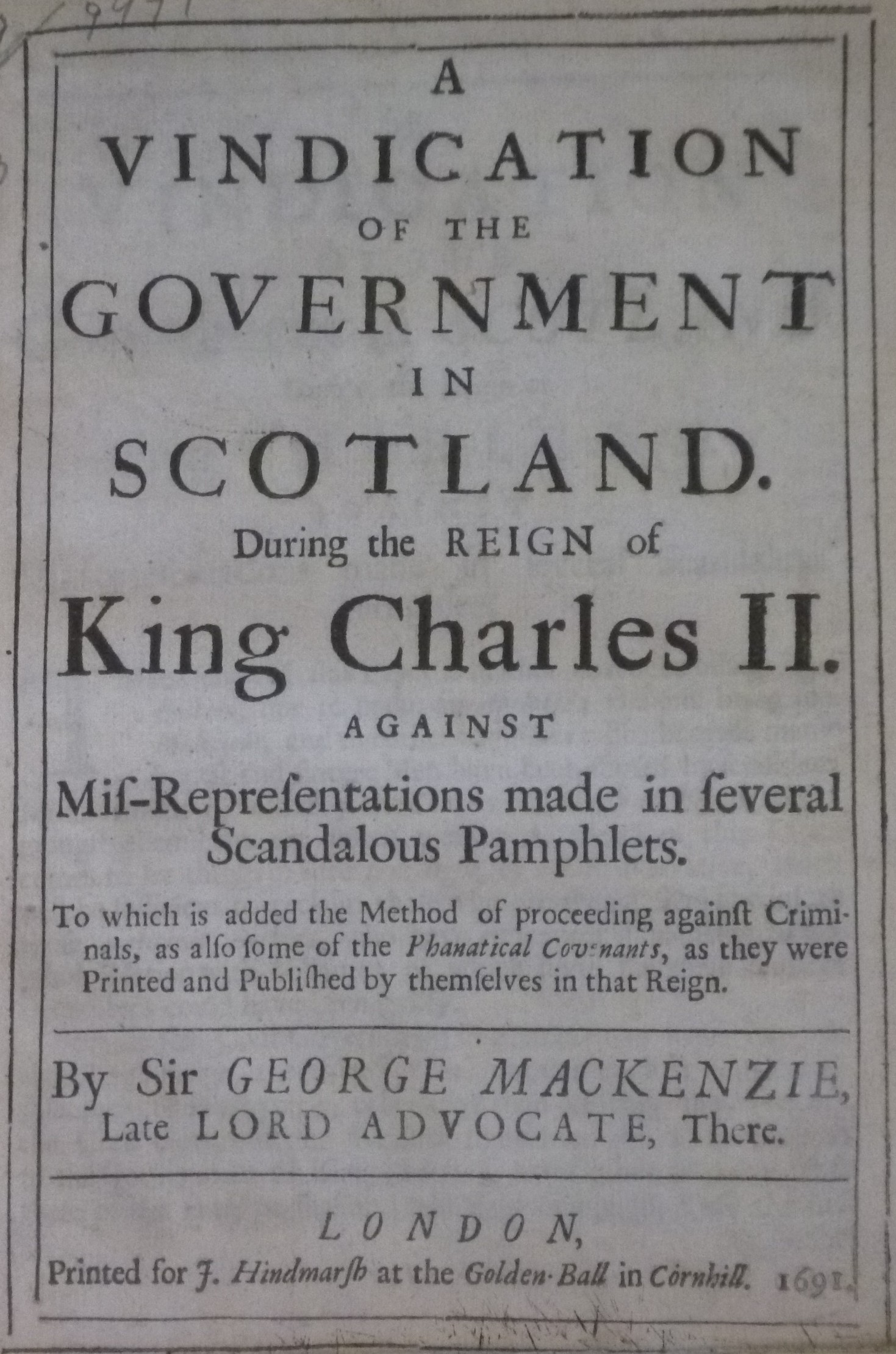
Title page of Mackenzie's 'Vindication', published in 1691

- The Science of Heraldry, Treated as a Part of the Civil Law of Nations: Wherein Reasons are Given for its Principles, and Etymologies of its Harder Terms (1680);
- Institutions of the Law of Scotland (1684);
- Jus Regium: Or the Just and Solid Foundations of Monarchy in General, and More Especially of the Monarchy of Scotland: Maintain'd Against Buchannan, Naphtali, Dolman, Milton, &c. (1684), a major royalist tract;
- A Vindication of the Government in Scotland (1691);
- Antiquity of the Royal Line of Scotland (1686);
- Memoirs of the Affairs of Scotland from the Restoration of Charles II (1821).

Mackenzie took part in the Midlothian trials for witchcraft in 1661, and defended the alleged witch Maevia. He later wrote at length of his experience with witchcraft trials. He did not endorse the sceptical position, but stated that witches were fewer than common belief made out. He attributed confessions to the use of torture.

His Laws and Customs of Scotland in Matters Criminal (1678) was the first textbook of Scottish criminal law. In it Mackenzie defended the use of judicial torture in Scotland as legal. He said it was seldom used. In the aftermath of the Rye House Plot Charles II authorised the use of torture against William Spence, secretary to Archibald, Earl of Agyll, who was moved to Scotland. The Scottish privy council was reluctant, but eventually went beyond Scottish law in torturing Spence. Mackenzie visited William Carstares in prison in London, caught up in the same investigation, to warn him of the consequences of stubborn behaviour under questioning.

Other works were:

- Religio Stoici (1663);
- A Moral Essay preferring Solitude to Public Employment (1665);
- Moral Gallantry (1667); and
- The Moral History of Frugality (1691).

== Legacy ==
Mackenzie was the founder of the Advocates Library in Edinburgh. His inaugural oration there is dated 15 March 1689, so just before his departure south; but the evidence is that the oration was written some years before, and the library itself was operational from the early 1680s. The initiative followed Mackenzie's appointment as Dean of the Faculty of Advocates, in 1682.

== In Fiction ==
George Mackenzie of Rosehaugh features as a character in John Galt's novel Ringan Gilhaize, or The Covenanters (1823).

== Family ==
In 1662 Mackenzie married Elizabeth Dickson, daughter of John Dickson, Lord Hartree, a Senator of the College of Justice. They had:

- John (died young)
- Simon (died young)
- George (died young)
- Agnes, who married James Stuart, later 1st Earl of Bute
- Elizabeth, who married first Sir Archibald Cockburn of Langton and secondly the Sir James Mackenzie, Lord Royston

His first wife died not later than 1667-1668 and in 1670 he married secondly Margaret, daughter of Haliburton of Pitcur. They had a son and two daughters:

- George, who married but died, without male issue, before his father
- Anne, who married Sir William Dick of Prestonfield
- Elizabeth, who married Sir John Stuart of Grandtully

== See also ==
- Rosehaugh House
