= Presbytery of Ross =

Presbytery of the Church of Scotland

The Presbytery of Ross is one of the forty-six presbyteries of the Church of Scotland, served by the local presbytery for Ross and Cromarty. It was part of the Synod of Ross, Sutherland and Caithness until synods were abolished in the early 1990s.

The Presbytery represents and supervises 21 Church of Scotland congregations within the area, a significant increase since 1693, when the Presbytery of Ross and Sutherland had only four Presbyterian ministers. It meets monthly and comprises Ministers and Elders of the member churches. Records of the Presbytery of Ross go back to at least 1693.

In its modern incarnation, the Presbytery of Ross was the result of the mergers of the Presbytery of Tain (which may have been in existence as early as 1588, although its own records are extant only from 1706) and the Presbytery of Chanonry and Dingwall in 1981.

In 2016, the Presbytery made history when a husband and wife were simultaneously ordained as ministers, a first for the Church of Scotland.

Derek Browning, the Moderator of the General Assembly of the Church of Scotland, visited a number of the parishes in the Presbytery in 2018 as part of his duties.

== Congregations ==
Parish	Church location	Minister	Details
Kiltearn	Evanton	Rev Donald MacSween	
Resolis			
Lochbroom & Ullapool	Ullapool		
Fodderty & Strathpeffer	Strathpeffer	Interim Moderator Mr K.MacKay	
This list is incomplete. You can help by using the References below to add entries.

== See also ==
- List of Church of Scotland synods and presbyteries
