= Munlochy =

Coordinates: 57.549932°N 4.26228°W

Munlochy: Scottish Gaelic: Poll Lochaidh
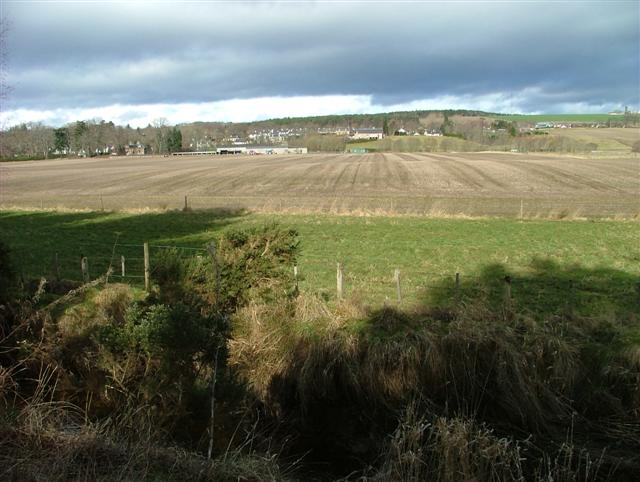
- Fields beside Bayhead Wood Looking towards Munlochy.

- Location within the Ross and Cromarty area
- OS grid reference: NH647533
- Council area: Highland
- Country: Scotland
- Sovereign state: United Kingdom
- Post town: MUNLOCHY
- Postcode district: IV8
- Police: Scotland
- Fire: Scottish
- Ambulance: Scottish

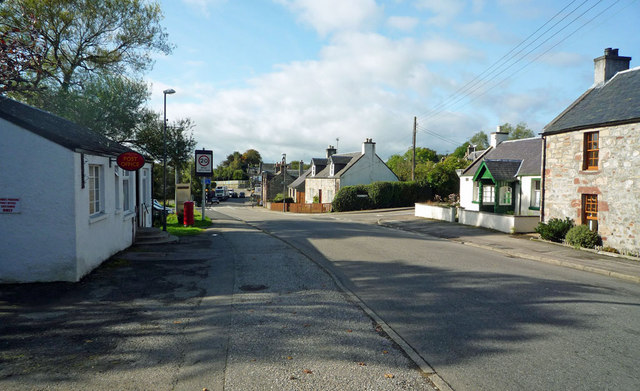
Munlochy main street

Munlochy (/mənˈlɒxi/ mən-LOKH-ee; Scottish Gaelic: Poll Lochaidh) is a small village, lying at the head of Munlochy Bay (Ob Poll Lochaidh), in the Black Isle in Ross and Cromarty, in northern Scotland.

There are few early records of a settlement, but it seems likely that Munlochy expanded in the 1760s due to quarry workers extracting stone nearby to build Fort George on the far side of the Moray Firth.

== Geography ==
Munlochy sits at the top of the tidal inlet of Munlochy Bay, that is itself an opening of the Moray Firth.

== Munlochy Bridge ==
This is the name of popular pipe tune, a two line, three part Strathspey, which is often played for dancing.

== See also ==
- Clootie well
- Black Isle
