= Culbokie =

Coordinates: 57°36′06″N 4°20′20″W

Culbokie: Scottish Gaelic: An Cùil Bhàicidh
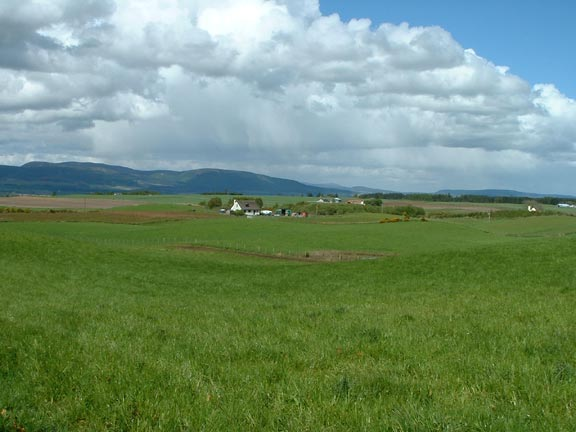
- Culbokie area with green pasture

- Location within the Ross and Cromarty area
- Area: 33 sq mi (85 km^{2})
- Population: 1,179
  - Density: 36/sq mi (14/km^{2})
- OS grid reference: NH 6033 5925
  - Edinburgh: 122 mi (196 km)
  - London: 454 mi (731 km)
- Community council: Black Isle (ward)
- District: Ross Shire
- Council area: Highland
- Lieutenancy area: Ross and Cromarty (lieutenancy area)
- Country: Scotland
- Sovereign state: United Kingdom
- Post town: Dingwall
- Postcode district: IV7
- Dialling code: 01349
- Police: Scotland
- Fire: Scottish
- Ambulance: Scottish
- UK Parliament: Caithness, Sutherland and Easter Ross
- Scottish Parliament: Skye, Lochaber and Badenoch (Scottish Parliament constituency)

Culbokie (An Cùil Bhàicidh in Gaelic, meaning 'the haunted nook') is a small village in Ross and Cromarty, Scottish Highlands, Scotland. It is located on the north side of the Black Isle. The village is 3 miles (5 km) south-east of Dingwall and about 9 miles (14 km) north of Inverness.

== Village ==
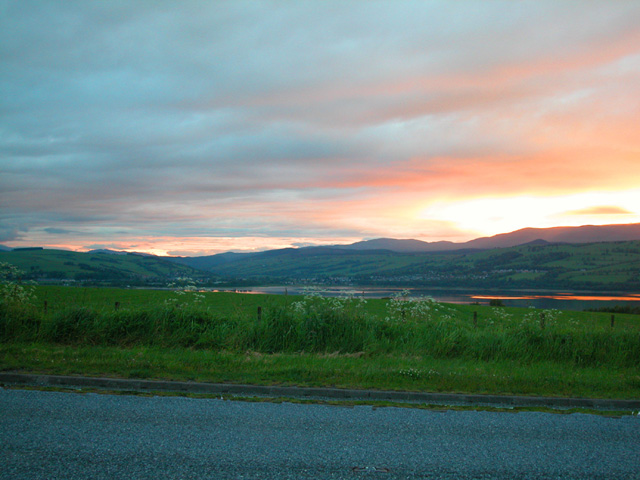
View towards Dingwall from Culbokie

There is one school, a shop/post office, a public house (the Culbokie Inn) and Findon Hall Community Centre. Culbokie has a range of community and youth groups, including Beavers, Cubs, Scouts, Badminton, Playgroup, Football and a Senior Citizens club.

It is known for its spectacular scenery and its old world ambiance including an authentic water pump from the early 19th century.

Since the mid-2000s, the village has expanded significantly and this has resulted in a mismatch of developments. It is unusual in that there is agricultural land separating the east from the west end of the village, in effect making it two entities.

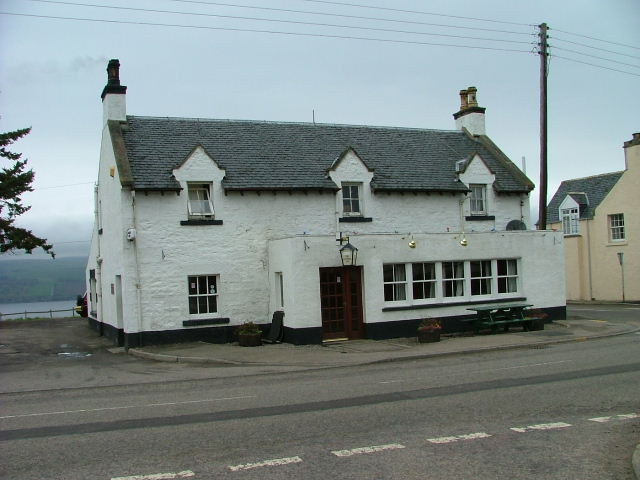
The Culbokie Inn

The village is a commuter location for people who work in Inverness. The new Culbokie Primary School opened at Easter 2007.

== Community Trust ==
In 2014, The Culbokie Community Trust was formed following a consultation with the villagers. The village has seen a rapid growth in population due to new housing developments. Despite this, there were no extra facilities built. A major issue that was raised was that there is no health centre nearby for the village and surrounding area.

In 2015, The Trust purchased 0.5 hectares (1.2 acres) of land adjacent to the current village shop and post office. The first phase of development is planned to include the building of a new community hub. The new hub intends to house a cafe, meeting rooms and a healthcare room.

Part of the land is earmarked for affordable housing and as of late-2018 plans have been submitted to the Highland Council for consideration.

Other projects begun by the Trust include; a monthly community market, which sells everything from fresh food to art, and projects in the nearby Culbokie Woods.
