= 78th (Highlanders) Regiment of Foot =

78th Highland Regiment
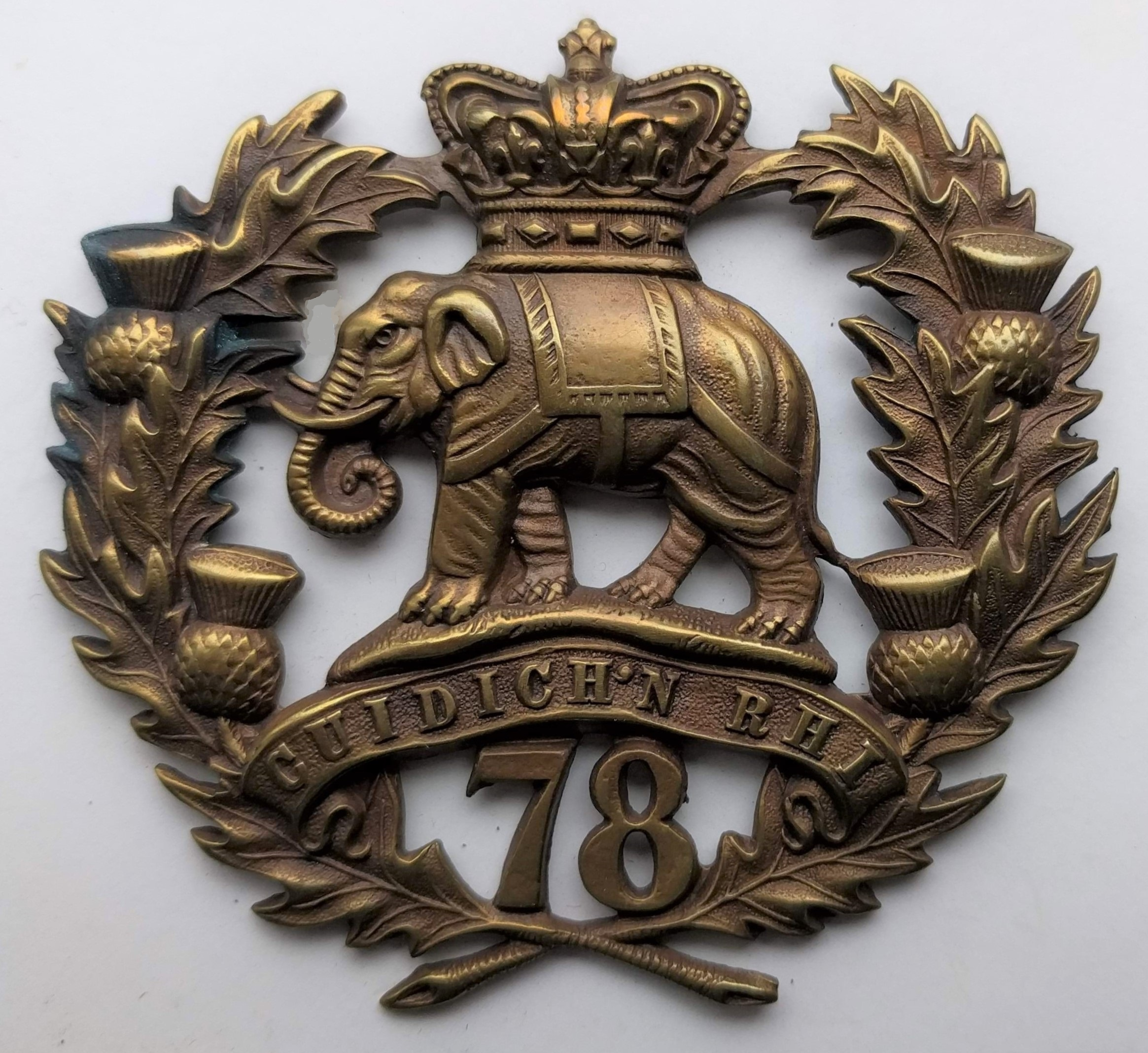
- Bonnet badge
- Active: 1793–1881
- Country: Kingdom of Great Britain (1793–1800); United Kingdom (1801–81)
- Branch: British Army
- Type: Infantry Regiment
- Size: One battalion (two battalions, 1794–96 and 1804–16)
- Garrison/HQ: Fort George, near Inverness (1873–81)
- Nickname: The King's Men
- Mascot: Elephant
- Engagements: French Revolutionary Wars; Second Maratha War; Napoleonic Wars; Anglo-Persian War; Indian Rebellion; Second Afghan War

Insignia
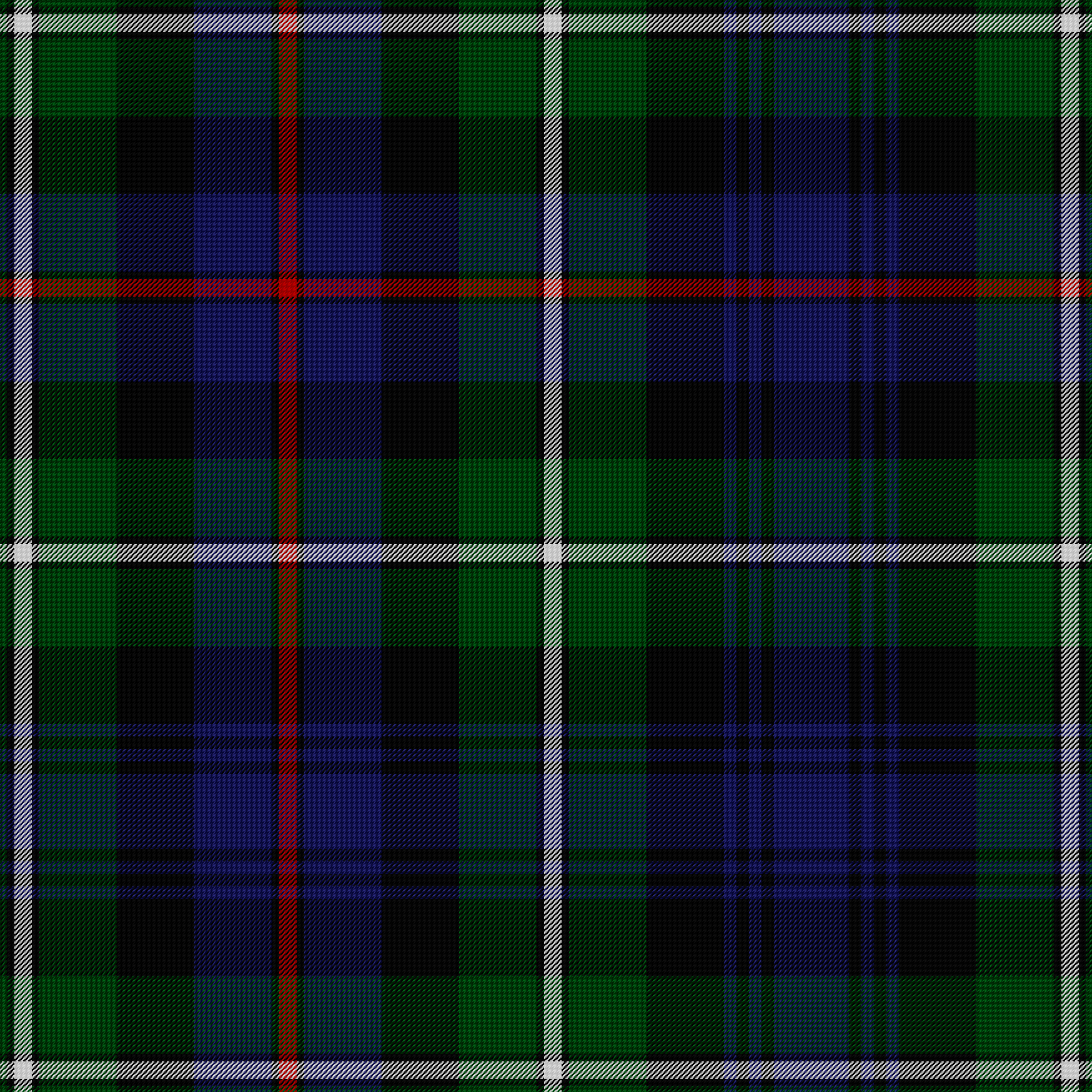
- Tartan: Regimental tartan (dark version of what later became Clan Mackenzie pattern)

Colours of the regiment

The 78th (Highlanders) Regiment of Foot was a Highland Infantry Regiment of the Line, raised in 1793. Under the Childers Reforms it amalgamated with 72nd Regiment, Duke of Albany's Own Highlanders to form the Seaforth Highlanders in 1881.

== History ==
=== Early history ===
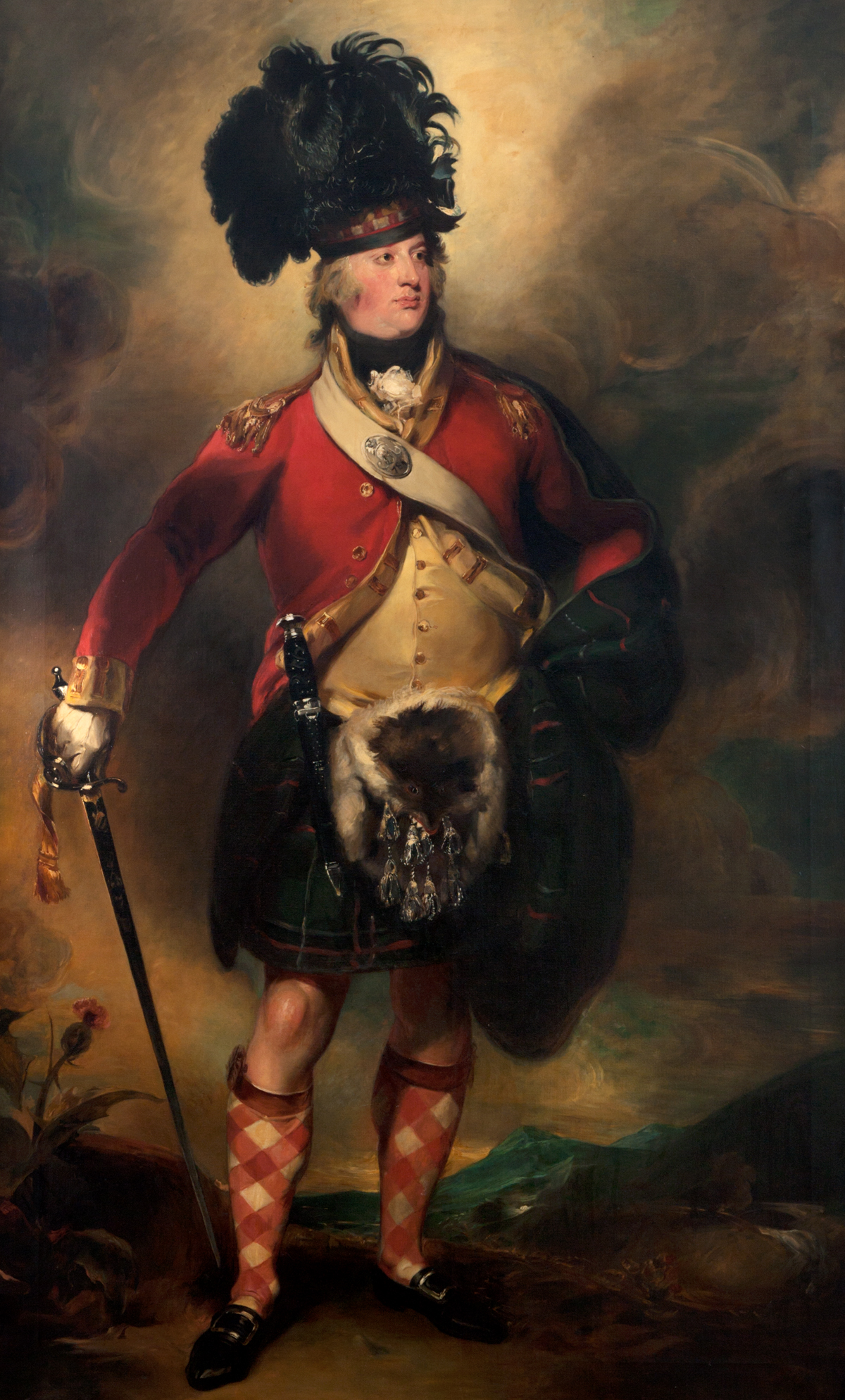
Francis Humberston MacKenzie, founder of the regiment, by Sir Thomas Lawrence

The regiment was raised by Francis Humberston MacKenzie, Chief of the Clan Mackenzie and later Lord Seaforth, as the 78th (Highlanders) Regiment of Foot (or The Ross-shire Buffs) on 8 March 1793. First assembled at Fort George in July 1793, the regiment moved to the Channel Islands in August 1793, and embarked for Holland in September 1794 for service in the French Revolutionary Wars. It saw action at the defence of Nijmegen in November 1794. In a bayonet attack there the regiment lost one officer and seven men; a further four officers and 60 men were wounded. The regiment moved to England in April 1795 and then sailed to France for the Battle of Quiberon Bay in June 1795 and the landing at Île d'Yeu, off the Brittany coast, in September 1795, after which it was stationed in England.

In 1794 the 78th raised a second battalion which, in July 1795, sailed for South Africa. Here it took part in the successful attack by a British fleet under Sir George Elphinstone on the Dutch Cape Colony, then held by the forces of the Batavian Republic: the attack led to the capitulation by the Dutch Navy at Saldanha Bay and the capture of the colony by British forces in September 1796.

In March 1796 the 1st battalion sailed from England to South Africa where, in June that year it amalgamated with the 2nd battalion. In November the newly merged regiment left South Africa for India. here it saw action at the Battle of Assaye in September 1803, during the Second Anglo-Maratha War. During the battle the regiment were tasked with retaking the Maratha gun line. For their part in this decisive victory, the 78th was presented with a special third colour by the East India Company, with the elephant symbol borne on the colour worn as a regimental badge. Later, when stationed in Ceylon, the 78th acquired a baby elephant as a regimental mascot. It returned to Scotland with the regiment, and was finally presented to Edinburgh Zoo.

=== Napoleonic Wars ===
The regiment remained in India until it joined the Invasion of Java and the capture of Fort Cornelis in August 1811. In June 1812, the regiment took part in the siege and ensuing sack of Yogyakarta. 100 men of the regiment took part in a 1812 punitive expedition against the Sultanate of Sambas, but the expedition was forced to return upon encountering shore batteries, with the complement insufficient to take the defenses by storm. A second expedition, involving the 14th Regiment and Sepoy troops, would be launched in 1813 with success. Also in 1813, part of the regiment would be engaged in the suppression of a peasant rebellion in East Java, which had seen two officers of the regiment killed.

Leaving Java in September 1816, the vessel the battalion was travelling on, Frances Charlotte, was wrecked off Preparis, Burma, on 5 November on the way to Bengal. There were relatively few deaths and the Prince Blucher rescued most of the survivors, who it carried to Calcutta; cruisers from the British East India Company rescued the remainder. Prince Blucher carried a part of the battalion on to England, arriving at Portsmouth in June 1817.

A second battalion was again raised in May 1804. In late 1805 this embarked for Gibraltar, before sailing to Italy and participating in the Battle of Maida in July 1806. It also took part in the Alexandria Expedition in spring 1807. Three companies of the regiment were captured at Al Hamed near Rosetta: among the prisoners was Thomas Keith who converted to Islam and entered Ottoman service. Returning home in January 1808, a draft from the battalion were present at the disastrous Dutch Walcheren Campaign in autumn 1809, which suffered substantial losses due to malaria. Although under strength, the battalion embarked for Holland in January 1814, and routed a larger French force during a skirmish at Merksem, near Antwerp. Remaining in Belgium on garrison duty, the battalion was in reserve at Nieuwpoort during the Waterloo campaign, returning home in February 1816.

By 1817 both the 1st and 2nd battalions were stationed in Scotland, where they were amalgamated the same year. The regiment was then posted to Ireland until 1826.

=== The Victorian era ===
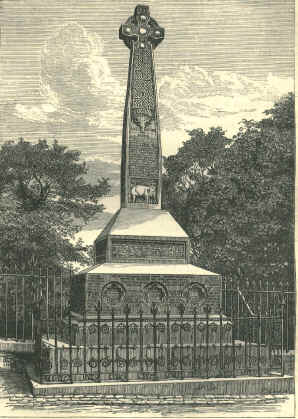
78 Highlanders Indian Rebellion Monument, Edinburgh Castle

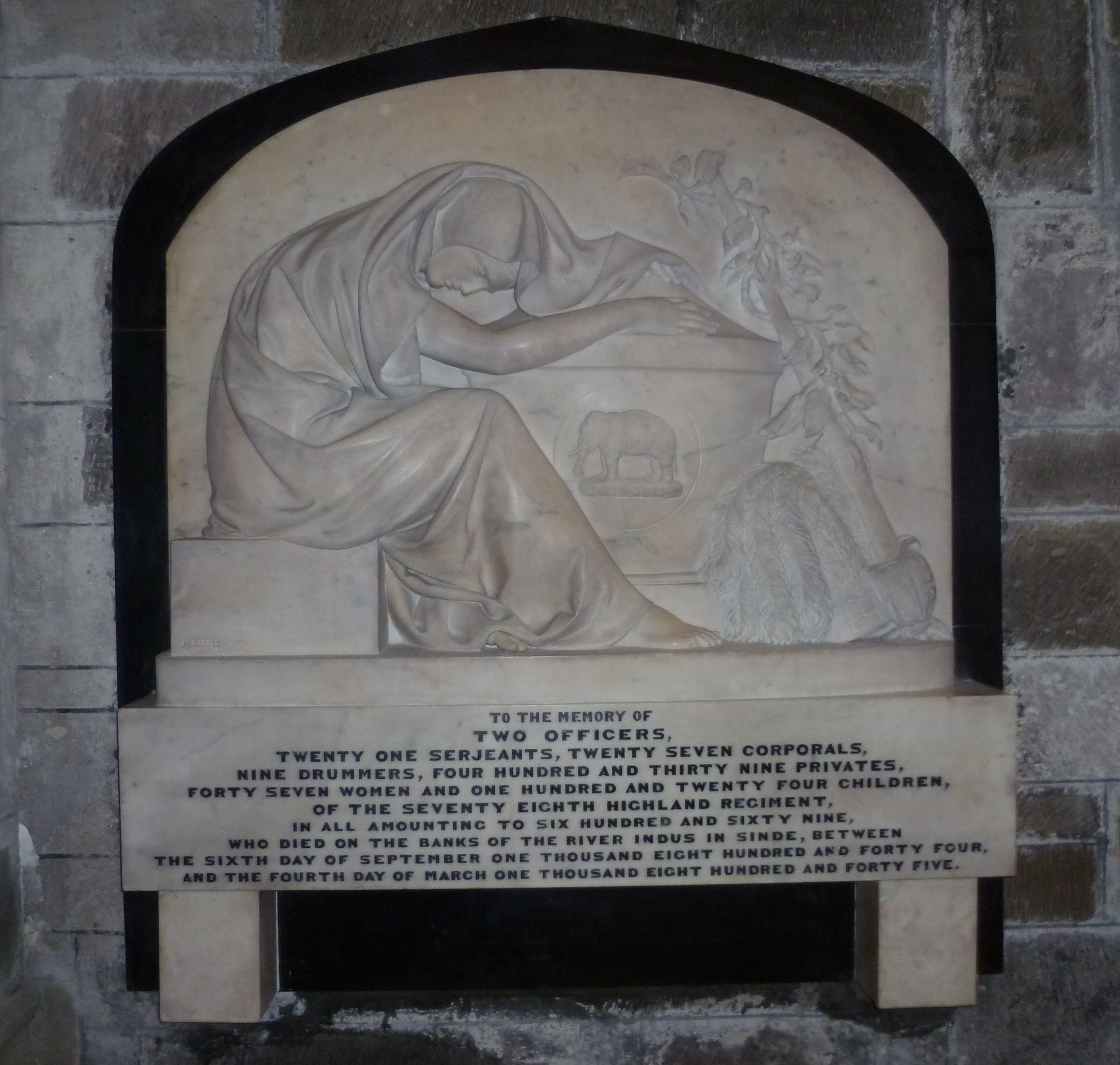
Sindh memorial to the 78th Highlanders in St Giles' Cathedral, Edinburgh

The regiment embarked for a tour in Ceylon in April 1826 and did not return home until February 1838. In 1831 Major Jonathan Forbes, while returning on horseback from a trip to Pollonnuruwa, encountered the "bush covered summit of Sigiriya". After home service that included responding to industrial riots in Lancashire in 1840, the 78th travelled to India in April 1842, to replace forces lost during the First Anglo-Afghan War. While at Sindh, largely due to cholera, the regiment lost two officers, 496 soldiers and 171 women and children between September 1844 and March 1845. To make up for the losses, replacements were recruited from across the United Kingdom, reducing the proportion of Scots in the regiment from 91% to under half. After service in India and Aden, the 78th moved to Persia in January 1857, and took part in the Battle of Khushab in February 1857 during the brief Anglo-Persian War.

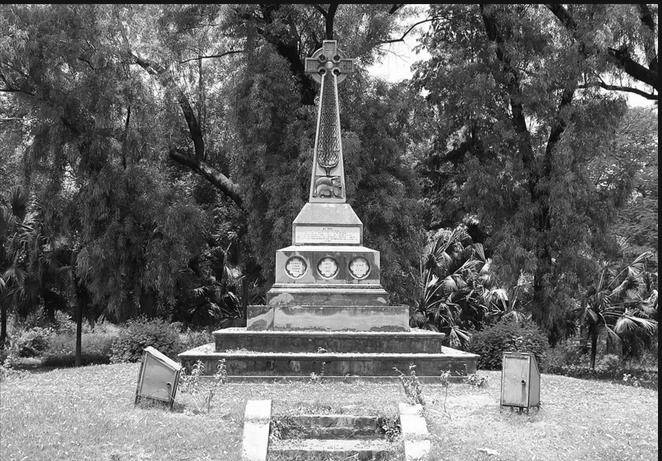
78 Highlanders Monument, Lucknow

The regiment returned to India in May 1857 to help suppress the Indian Rebellion. It took part in the recapture of Cawnpore in July 1857 and then took part in the reinforcement of Lucknow, strongly defending the residency until it was relieved in November 1857. The regiment won eight Victoria Crosses during the campaign and was hailed as the 'saviour of British India' and feted for its conduct at Lucknow. This included being commemorated by poets such as John Greenleaf Whittier and Alfred, Lord Tennyson. The regiment returned home in September 1859.

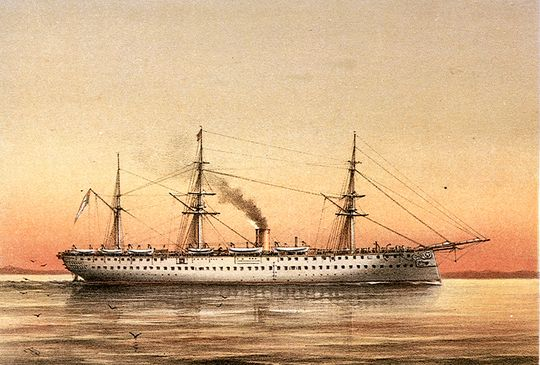
HMS Crocodile - transported the 78th to Halifax

The regiment embarked for Gibraltar in 1865, and then in May 1869 sailed on the troopship HMS Crocodile to Halifax in Nova Scotia, arriving on 14 May 1869. Each summer, men from the regiment camped at Bedford to practise musketry at the military range. On their departure in 1871, a farewell ball was hosted by the Grandmaster of the Masonic Lodge of Nova Scotia, Alexander Keith. The regiment, together with 17 young local women who had married soldiers, embarked for Ireland in the troopship HMS Orontes in November 1871.

In 1871 the regiment moved to Ireland, where it helped to keep order during sectarian rioting, before a number of postings in Scotland and England. In March 1879 the 78th arrived in India, moving to Afghanistan to undertake garrison duty at Kandahar over the winter of 1880–81 at the end of the Second Afghan War.

As part of the Cardwell Reforms of the 1870s, single-battalion regiments were linked together to share a single depot and recruiting district. The 78th was linked with the 71st (Highland) Regiment of Foot, and assigned to district no. 55, with its depot at Fort George, near Inverness. On 1 July 1881 the Childers Reforms came into effect, and the regiment ended its link with the 71st, and amalgamated with the 72nd Regiment, Duke of Albany's Own Highlanders to form the Seaforth Highlanders, with the 78th becoming the second battalion.

== Legacy ==
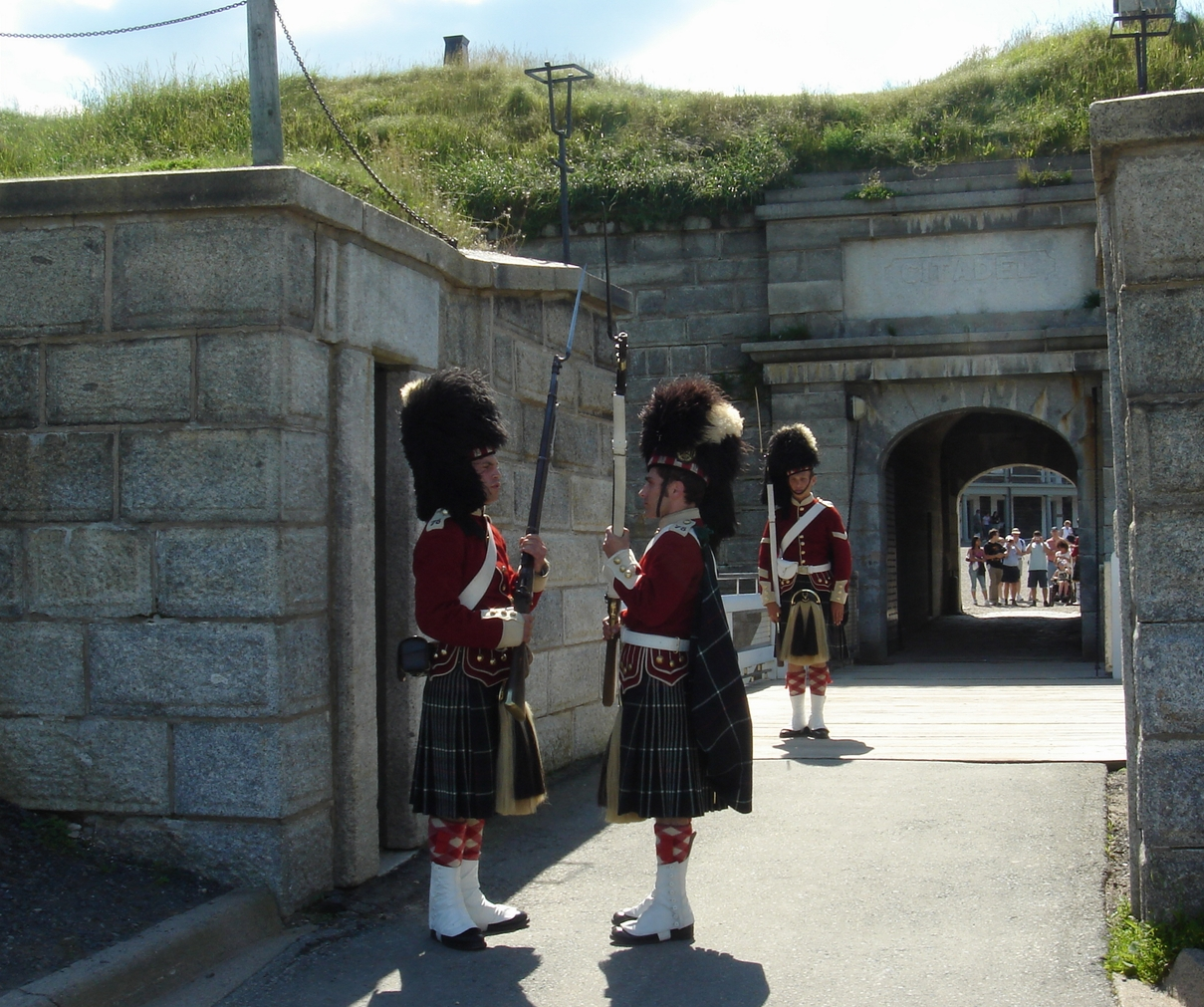
Re-enactors depicting soldiers of the 78th Highland Regiment

The regiment's legacy is retained through Nova Scotian institutions such as Citadel Hill, which features a living history program with reenactors portraying the 78th Highland Regiment and controls the 78th Highlanders (Halifax Citadel) Pipe Band, a grade one pipe band formed in 1983.

The regiment's modern-day successor in the British Army is the Highlanders (Seaforth, Gordons and Camerons), the 4th Battalion of the Royal Scottish Regiment.

== Battle honours ==
Battle honours won by the regiment were:

- Second Anglo-Maratha War: Assaye
- Napoleonic Wars: Maida, Java
- Anglo–Persian War: Persia, Koosh-Ab
- Indian Rebellion of 1857: Lucknow
- Second Anglo-Afghan War: Afghanistan. 1879–80

== Victoria Cross recipients ==
All Victoria Crosses received by the regiment were for service during the Indian Rebellion of 1857:

- Lieutenant Andrew Cathcart Bogle (29 July 1857)
- Lieutenant Joseph Petrus Hendrik Crowe (12 August 1857)
- Private James Hollowell (26 September 1857)
- Surgeon Joseph Jee (25 September 1857)
- Lieutenant Herbert Taylor Macpherson (25 September 1857)
- Assistant surgeon Valentine Munbee McMaster (25 September 1857)
- Colour Sergeant Stewart McPherson (26 September 1857)
- Private Henry Ward (25 September 1857)

== Colonels of the Regiment ==
Colonels of the Regiment were:

78th (Highlanders) Regiment of Foot (or The Ross-shire Buffs)

- 1793–1796: Lt-Gen. Francis Humberston Mackenzie, Lord Seaforth
- 1796–1809: Lt-Gen. Alexander Mackenzie Fraser
- 1809–1812: Gen. Sir James Henry Craig, KB
- 1812–1822: Lt-Gen. Sir Samuel Auchmuty, GCB
- 1822–1834: Lt-Gen. Sir Edward Barnes, GCB
- 1834–1837: Lt-Gen. Sir Lionel Smith, Bt., GCB, GCH
- 1837–1851: Gen. Paul Anderson, CB, KC
- 1851–1853: Lt-Gen. Sir Neil Douglas, KCB, KCH
- 1853–1860: Lt-Gen. Sir William Chalmers, CB, KCH
- 1860–1863: Gen. Roderick Macneil
- 1863–1881: F.M. Sir Patrick Grant, GCB, GCMG

== Sources ==
- Brander, Michael (1971). The Scottish Highlanders and their Regi-ments. Seeley, Service & Co, London. ISBN 0-85422-012-7.
- Fairrie, Lieutenant Colonel Angus (1998). "Cuidich'n Righ": A History of the Queen's Own Highlanders (Seaforth and Camerons). Inverness: Regimental Headquarters, Queen's Own Highlanders. ISBN 0-9508986-0-0.
- MacVeigh, James (1887). The Jubilee Memorial. The Historical Records of The 78th Highlanders Or Ross-shire Buffs, (Now 2nd Battalion Seaforth Highlanders) From 1793 to 1887. From Official and Authentic Sources. Dumfries. OCLC 562414733.
- Millar, Simon (2006), Assaye 1803: Wellington's First and 'Bloodiest' Victory, Oxford: Osprey Publishing, ISBN 1-84603-001-3
- Pollock, Alsager (1837). The United Service Magazine, Notes of an Expedition to Alexandria of the year 1807. H. Colburn.
- Sym, John M. (1962). Seaforth Highlanders. Gale & Polden, Aldershot. OCLC 1059816697.
