= Herbert Macpherson =

British general and recipient of the Victoria Cross

Lieutenant-General Sir Herbert Macpherson VC KCB KCSI
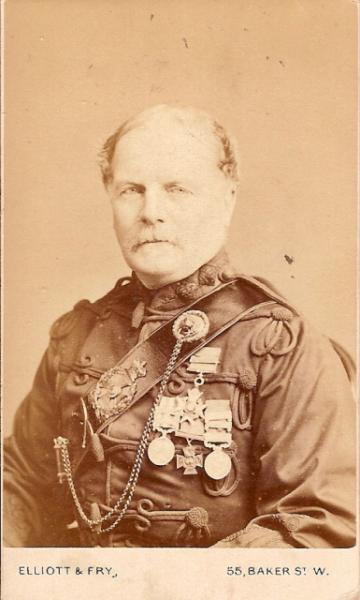
- Born: 22 January 1827; Ardersier, Inverness-shire
- Died: 20 October 1886 (aged 59); Prone, Burma
- Military career
- Allegiance: United Kingdom
- Branch: British Army; British Indian Army
- Rank: Lieutenant-General
- Units: 78th Highlanders; Bengal Staff Corps
- Commands: Madras Army
- Conflicts: Anglo-Persian War; Indian Mutiny; Lushai Expedition; Jowaki Expedition; Second Anglo-Afghan War; 1882 Anglo-Egyptian War; Third Anglo-Burmese War
- Awards: Victoria Cross; Order of the Bath; Order of the Star of India; Order of the Medjidie (Turkey)

Lieutenant-General Sir Herbert Taylor Macpherson VC KCB KCSI (22 January 1827 – 20 October 1886) was a British Army and Indian Army officer and a Scottish recipient of the Victoria Cross, the highest and most prestigious award for gallantry in the face of the enemy that can be awarded to British and Commonwealth forces.

== Early life ==
Macpherson, was born at Ardersier, near Fort George in Scotland, the son of an officer in the 78th Highlanders. In 1845 he was commissioned ensign in his father's former regiment. Travelling with the regiment to India, he served in the Persian campaign of 1857 and in the Indian Mutiny the following year.

== Victoria Cross ==
He was 30 years old, and a lieutenant in the 78th Highlanders (later The Seaforth Highlanders) British Army, during the Indian Mutiny when the following deed took place on 25 September 1857 at siege of Lucknow for which he was awarded the VC:

For distinguished conduct at Lucknow, on the 25th September, 1857, in setting an example of heroic gallantry to the men of the regiment, at the period of the action, in which they captured two brass nine-pounders at the point of the bayonet.

— Field Force Orders of the late Major-General Havelock, 17 October 1857

Promoted captain in October 1857, he served at the defence of the Alambagh, and as brigade major during the final capture of Lucknow, where he was wounded. He was also promoted brevet major.

== Later career ==
After the Indian Mutiny, Macpherson transferred to the Indian Army. He served on the North-West Frontier in the Black Mountain campaign of 1868, the Lushai Expedition in 1871–72, and the Jowaki Expedition of 1877. During the Second Anglo-Afghan War he commanded a brigade that advanced up to Khyber Pass in 1878–79 and, during the second phase of the war in 1879–80, a brigade of the Kabul Field Force. For his service in Afghanistan, he was given the local rank of major-general in October 1880, and made a knight commander of the Order of the Bath (KCB) in March 1881.

In July 1882 Macpherson was promoted to lieutenant-general, and given command of the Indian contingent that served in the Egypt campaign, including the battle of Tell El Kebir. For this, he was made a knight commander of the Order of the Star of India (KCSI) in November 1882, and the Turkish Order of the Medjidie, second class.

Returning to India, in March 1886 he became Commander-in-Chief of the Madras Army and, after travelling to Burma to take command during the Third Anglo-Burmese War, he died of fever on the steamer Irrawaddy, on 20 October 1886.

== Family ==
Herbert's father was Col Duncan MacPherson of the 78th Regt. Herbert had 10 siblings all apparently without a mother. His elder brother was Maj Gen Sir James Duncan MacPherson KCB. In 1859, Herbert married Maria Eckford, daughter of Lieutenant-general James Eckford, C.B. - they had three children, a daughter and two sons, both his sons served as officers in the Army

== The medal ==
Macpherson's awards, including his Victoria Cross, are displayed at the Regimental Museum of Queen's Own Highlanders at Fort George, Inverness-shire, Scotland.

Military offices
Preceded by Sir Frederick Roberts	C-in-C, Madras Army; 1886	Succeeded by Sir Charles Arbuthnot
