= James Hollowell =

Recipient of the Victoria Cross

James Hollowell VC
- Born: 1823; Lambeth, London
- Died: 4 April 1876 (aged 52–53); Holborn, London
- Burial place: Brookwood Cemetery
- Military career
- Allegiance: United Kingdom
- Branch: British Army
- Rank: Lance-Corporal
- Units: 78th Regiment of Foot
- Conflicts: Anglo-Persian War; Indian Mutiny
- Awards: Victoria Cross

James Hollowell VC (1823 – 4 April 1876) was a British recipient of the Victoria Cross, the highest and most prestigious award for gallantry in the face of the enemy that can be awarded to British and Commonwealth forces.

== Details ==
Hollowell was about 34 years old, and a private in the 78th Regiment of Foot (later The Seaforth Highlanders (Ross-shire Buffs, Duke of Albany's)), British Army during the Indian Mutiny when the following deed took place on 26 September 1857 at the Siege of Lucknow, India for which he was awarded the VC:

78th Regiment Private James Hollowell

Date of Act of Bravery, 26th September, 1857

A party, on the 26th of September, 1857, was shut up and besieged in a house in the city of Lucknow, by the rebel sepoys. Private James Hollowell, one of the party, behaved, throughout the day, in the most admirable manner; he directed, encouraged, and led the others, exposing himself fearlessly, and by his talent in persuading and cheering, prevailed on nine dispirited men to make a successful defence, in a burning house, with the enemy, firing through four windows. (Extract from Divisional Orders of Major-General Sir James Outran, G.C.B., dated 14th October, 1857.)

He later achieved the rank of lance-corporal. He joined the Corps of Commissionaires and is buried in an unmarked grave in their plot in Brookwood Cemetery.

== The Medal ==
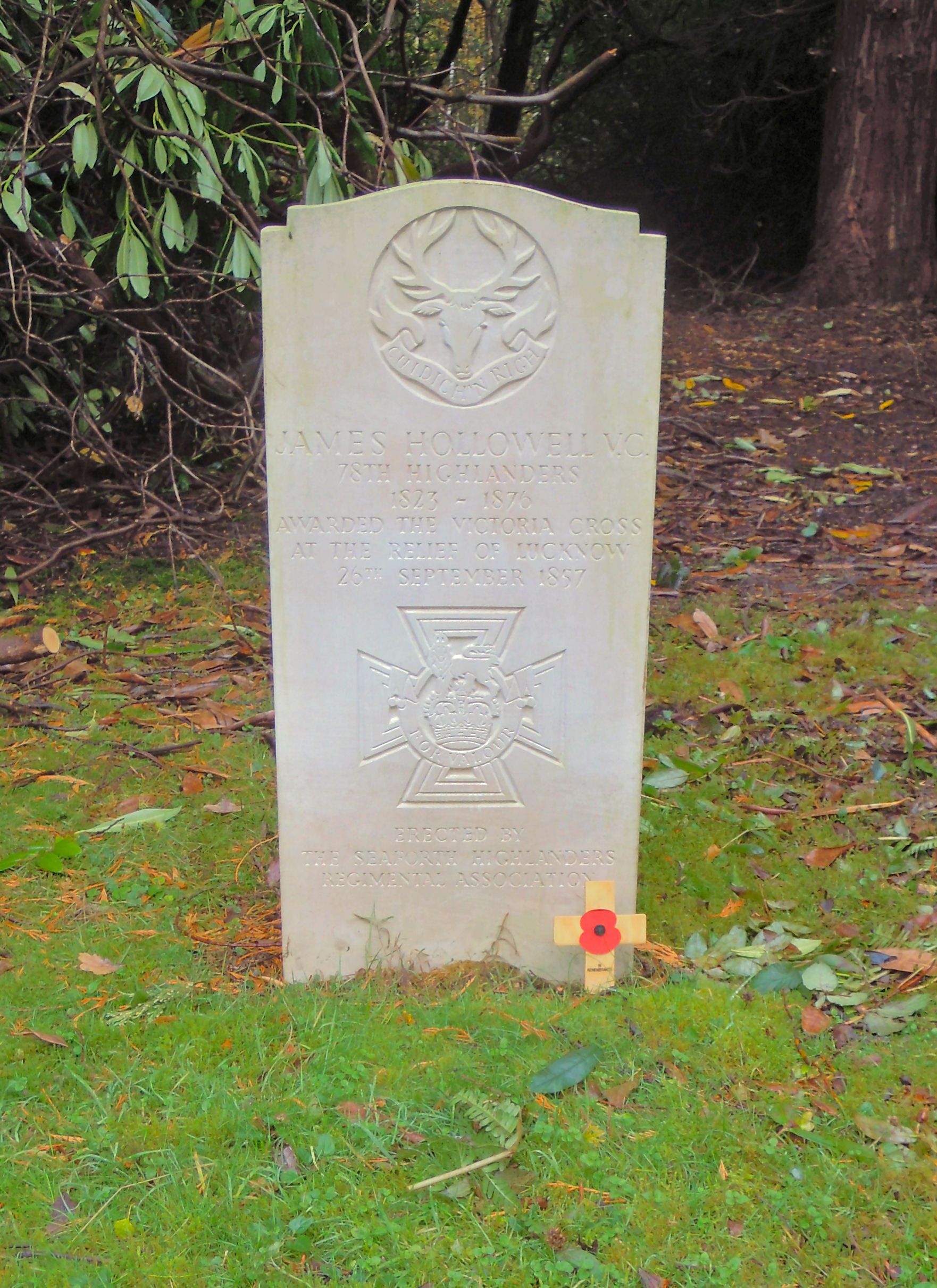
Hollowell's grave marker in Brookwood Cemetery

His Victoria Cross is displayed at the Regimental Museum of Queens Own Highlanders, Fort George, Inverness-shire, Scotland.
