= Stewart McPherson =

Stewart McPherson may refer to:

- Stewart McPherson (VC) (1822–1892), Scottish soldier in India and recipient of the Victoria Cross
- Stewart McPherson (geographer) (born 1983), British geographer

== See also ==
- Stewart Macpherson (1865–1941), British musician and composer
- Stewart MacPherson (broadcaster) (1908–1995), Canadian broadcaster
