= Henry Ward (VC) =

Recipient of the Victoria Cross

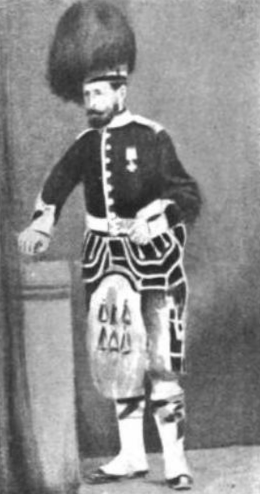
- Born: c. 1823; Harleston, Norfolk
- Died: 12 September 1867 (aged 43–44); Malvern, Worcestershire
- Burial place: Great Malvern Cemetery
- Military career
- Allegiance: United Kingdom
- Branch: British Army
- Service years: 1845–1865
- Rank: Quartermaster-Sergeant
- Units: 78th Regiment of Foot
- Conflicts: Anglo-Persian War; Indian Mutiny
- Awards: Victoria Cross

Henry Ward VC (c. 1823 – 12 September 1867) was an English soldier and a recipient of the Victoria Cross, the highest and most prestigious award for gallantry in the face of the enemy that can be awarded to British and Commonwealth forces. He was born in Harleston, Norfolk, and died in Malvern, Worcestershire.

== Details ==
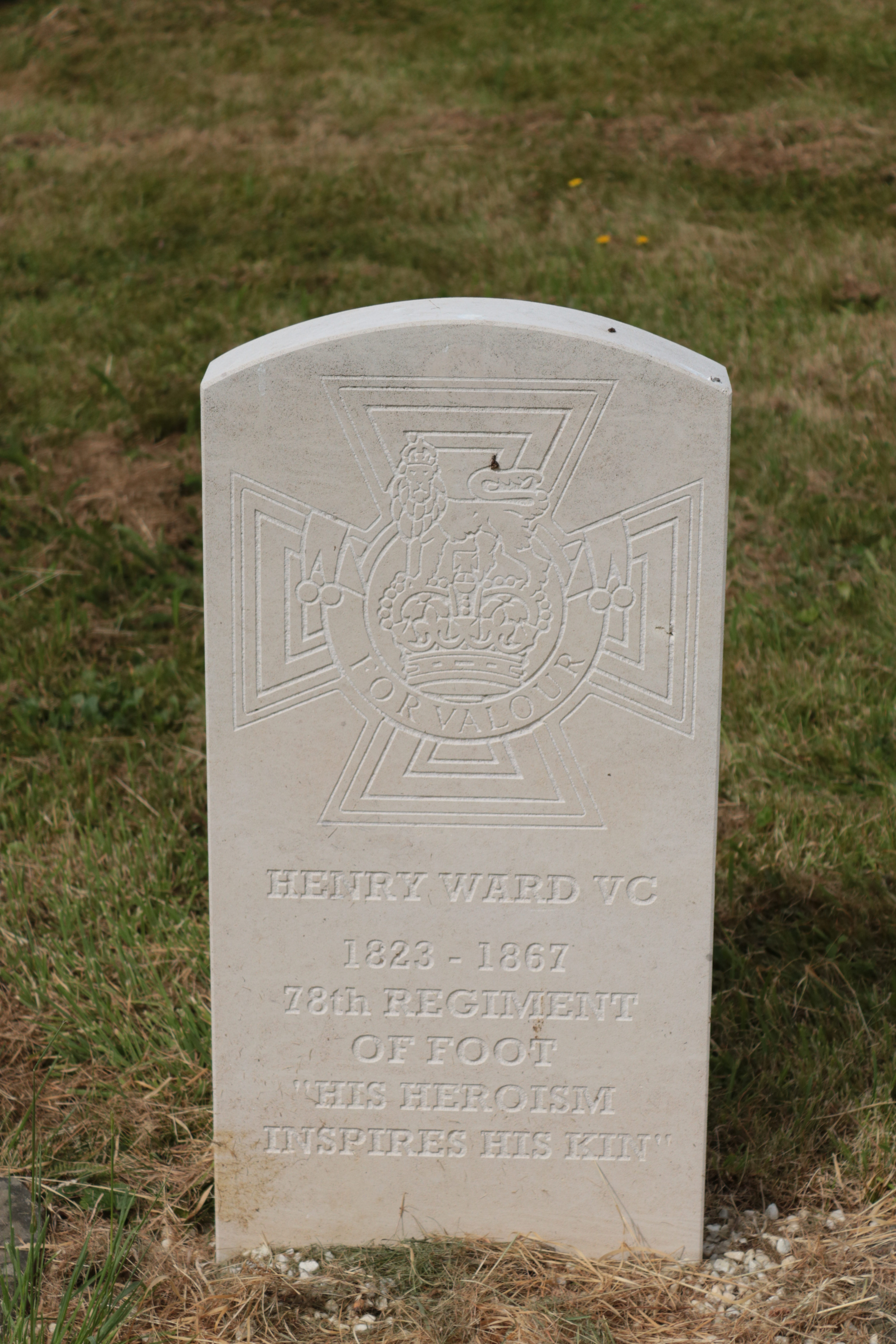
Headstone of Henry Ward VC, Great Malvern Cemetery, Great Malvern, United Kingdom

Ward was approximately 34 years old, and a private in the 78th Regiment of Foot (later The Seaforth Highlanders Ross-shire Buffs, Duke of Albany's), British Army during the Indian Mutiny when the following deed took place on 25 and 26 September 1857 in Lucknow, British India, for which he was awarded the VC:

For his gallant and devoted conduct in having on the night of the 25th, and morning of the 26th of September, 1857, remained by the dooly of Captain H. M. Havelock, 10th Regiment, Deputy Assistant-Adjutant-General, Field Force, who was severely wounded, and on the morning of the 26th of September, escorted that Officer and Private Thomas Pilkington, 78th Highlanders, who was also wounded, and had taken refuge in the same dooly, through a very heavy cross fire of ordnance and musketry. This soldier remained by the side of the dooly, and by his example and exertions kept the dooly bearers from dropping their double load, throughout the heavy fire, with the same steadiness as if on parade, thus saving the lives of both, and bringing them in safety to the Baillie Guard.

— Extract from Divisional Orders of Major-General Sir James Outram, G.C.B., dated 27 October 1857.

Ward later became the personal servant of Sir Henry Havelock whose life was saved by Ward in his VC action and later achieved the rank of quartermaster-sergeant. His Victoria Cross is displayed at the Regimental Museum of Queens Own Highlanders in Fort George, Inverness-shire, Scotland. Ward was buried in a pauper's grave in Malvern, Worcestershire. By 2014, his grave was in a poor state of repair and the local council proposed to repair in association with the Victoria Cross Trust.
