= Thomas Keith (soldier) =

Scottish soldier (died 1815)

Thomas Keith (c. 1785 – died; 1815) was a Scottish soldier, captured in Egypt while fighting for the United Kingdom. As a prisoner of war, he converted to Islam and joined the Egyptian military. He died in 1815 as governor of Medina while fighting the Saudi Emirate of Diriyah.

Born in Edinburgh, Keith enlisted in the 78th (Highlanders) Regiment of Foot on 4 August 1804. He went with the 2nd battalion of the regiment to join John Stuart in the British campaign to Sicily 1806. Soon after, Keith was sent as part of the Alexandria expedition of 1807.

After being captured at Al Hamed near Rosetta on 21 April 1807, Keith and a drummer in his regiment, William Thompson, were purchased by Ahmad Aga (nicknamed Ahmad Bonaparte). During this time the two Scots resolved to convert to Islam and change their names: Keith becoming Ibrahim Aga and Thompson becoming Osman. Keith had a quarrel with one of Ahmad's Mamluks, ironically a Sicilian. The Sicilian was killed in their duel and the Scot then sought the aid of the wife of Muhammad Ali Pasha, wali of Egypt. She sent Keith to the service of her son Tusun Pasha. In 1811, Keith joined Tusun's expedition against the Wahhabis of Arabia. After a successful campaign, Keith was made acting governor of Medina in 1815 in Tusun's absence. He was killed in a Wahhabi ambush later that year. He is buried in Cairo.

Thomas Keith is the subject of the novel Blood and Sand (1987) by Rosemary Sutcliff.
