= Andrew Cathcart Bogle =

Recipient of the Victoria Cross

- Major Bogle
- Born: 20 January 1829; Glasgow, Scotland
- Died: 11 December 1890 (aged 61); Sherborne, Dorset
- Burial place: St Lawrence's Churchyard, Effingham, Surrey
- Military career
- Allegiance: United Kingdom
- Branch: British Army
- Rank: Major
- Units: 72nd Highlanders; 78th Highlanders; 13th Regiment of Foot; 10th Regiment of Foot; 23rd Regiment of Foot
- Conflicts: Anglo-Persian War; Indian Mutiny
- Awards: Victoria Cross

Andrew Cathcart Bogle VC (20 January 1829 – 11 December 1890) was a Scottish recipient of the Victoria Cross (VC), the highest and most prestigious award for gallantry in the face of the enemy that can be awarded to British and Commonwealth forces.

== Life ==
Glasgow-born Bogle was educated at Cheltenham College. In December 1849 he joined the 78th Highlanders as an Ensign, and was promoted to Lieutenant in March 1853. He served with the 78th during the Persian War in 1857, before returning with his regiment to India at the beginning of the Indian Mutiny. Here, the 78th joined General Havelock's column that advanced to relieve the siege of Lucknow. It was during this advance that Bogle earned the VC.

=== VC action ===
Bogle was a 28-year-old lieutenant in the 78th (Highlanders) Regiment of Foot (later The Seaforth Highlanders), British Army during the Indian Mutiny when the following deed took place on 29 July 1857 in the attack on Oonao, India, for which he was awarded the VC:

Lieutenant (now Captain) Andrew Cathcart Bogle. 78th Regiment (now of the 2nd Battalion 13th Regiment)
Date of Act of Bravery, 29th July, 1857.
For conspicuous gallantry on the 29th July, 1857, in the attack at Oonao, in leading the way into a loop-holed house, strongly occupied by the enemy, from which a heavy fire harassed the advance of his regiment. Captain Bogle was severely wounded in this important service.

Bogle was presented with his VC by Queen Victoria on 4 January 1860 at Windsor Castle.

=== Later career ===
In February 1858 Bogle was appointed adjutant of the 78th Highlanders, and continued to serve with the regiment in the later stages of the Mutiny, including the final capture of Lucknow and the action at Bareilly. In August 1858 he was promoted captain and transferred to the 13th Foot, moving to the 10th Foot in August 1859. In April 1865 he was promoted major and transferred to the 23rd Foot in August 1868, before retiring shortly afterwards.

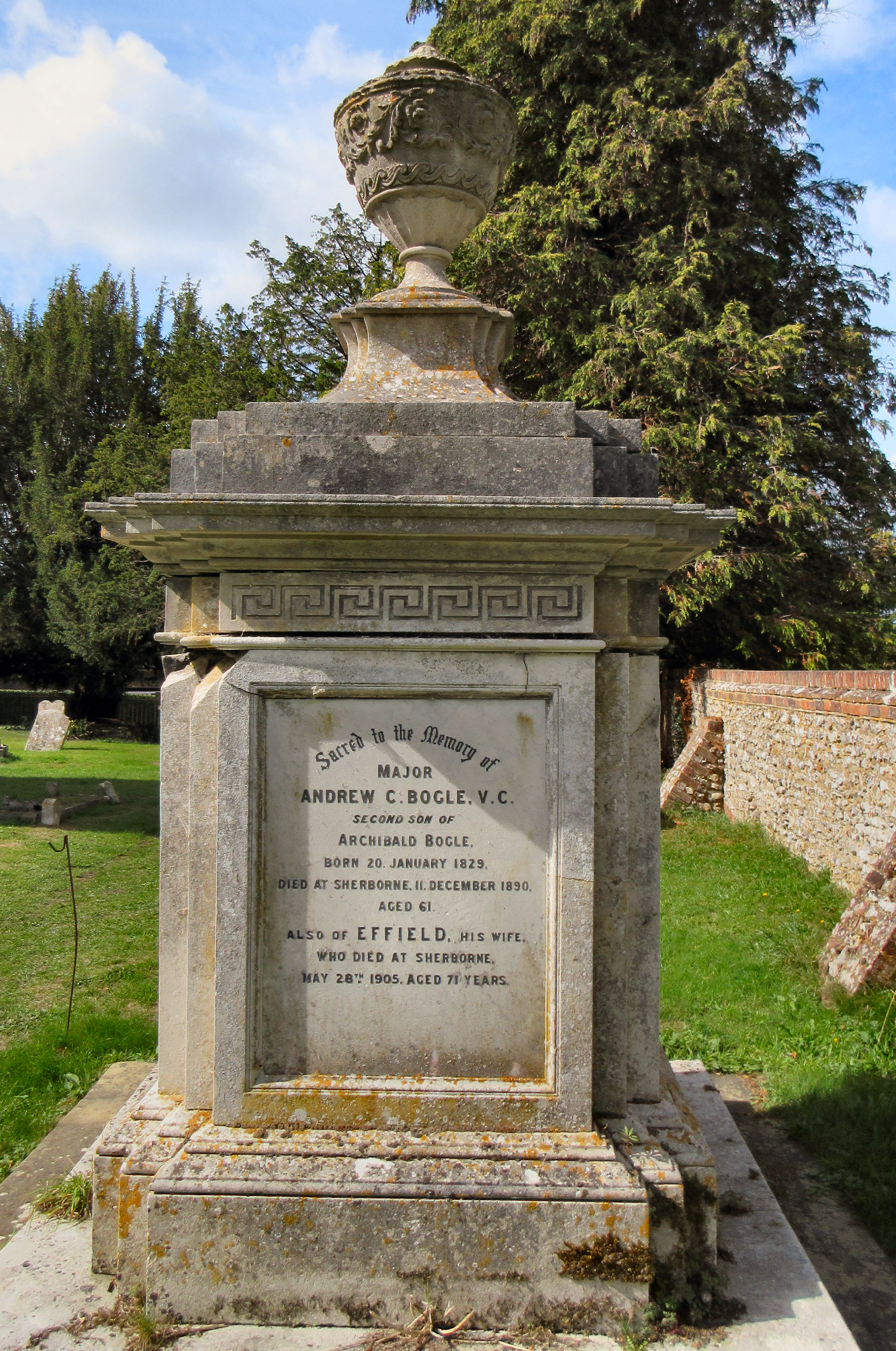
Memorial at St Lawrence's church, Effingham

In retirement Bogle lived in Sherborne House, Dorset, where he died after a long illness on 11 December 1890 aged 61. He was cremated at Woking Crematorium, Surrey, and his ashes interred in St Lawrence's Churchyard, Effingham, Surrey.

== The medal ==
His Victoria Cross is displayed at The Highlanders Museum at Fort George, Inverness-shire in Scotland.
