= Seaforth Highlanders =

British military unit

- Cap badge of the Seaforth Highlanders.
- Active: 1881–1961
- Country: United Kingdom
- Branch: British Army
- Type: Line Infantry
- Part of: Highland Brigade
- Garrison/HQ: Fort George, Inverness
- Motto: Cuidich 'n Righ (Aid the King)
- Battle honours: See below

Commanders
- Colonel of the Regiment: Edward, Prince of Wales (1920–36)

Insignia
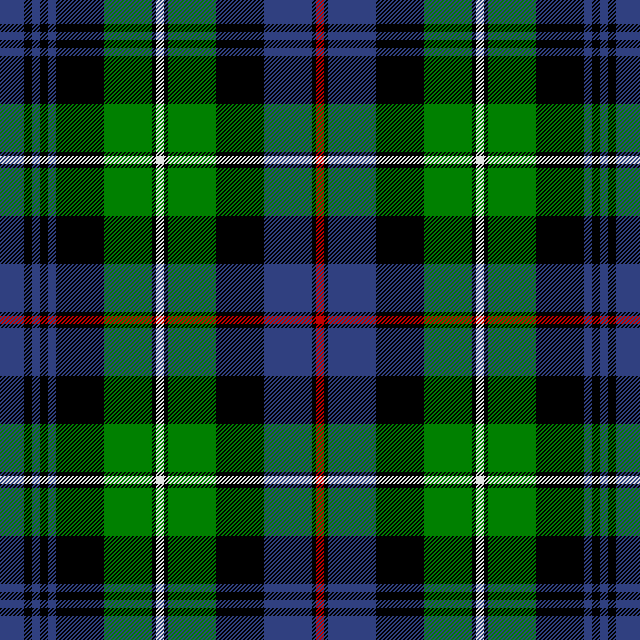
- Tartan (Mackenzie)

The Seaforth Highlanders (Ross-shire Buffs, the Duke of Albany's) was a line infantry regiment of the British Army, mainly associated with large areas of the northern Highlands of Scotland. The regiment existed from 1881 to 1961, and saw service in World War I and World War II, along with many smaller conflicts. In 1961 the regiment was amalgamated with the Queen's Own Cameron Highlanders to form the Queen's Own Highlanders (Seaforth and Camerons), which merged, in 1994, with the Gordon Highlanders to form the Highlanders (Seaforth, Gordons and Camerons). This later joined the Royal Scots Borderers, the Black Watch, the Royal Highland Fusiliers and the Argyll and Sutherland Highlanders to create the present Royal Regiment of Scotland.

== History ==
=== Formation ===
The regiment was created in 1881 through the amalgamation of the 72nd (Duke of Albany's Own Highlanders) Regiment of Foot and the 78th (Highlanders) (Ross-shire Buffs) Regiment of Foot, which became the 1st and 2nd battalions of the new regiment, and was part of the Childers Reforms of the British Army. It was named after Kenneth Mackenzie, 1st Earl of Seaforth, and his cousin Francis Mackenzie, 1st Baron Seaforth, who originally raised respectively the 72nd and 78th regiments. Originally named "Seaforth Highlanders (Ross-shire Buffs)", on 22 November 1881 Queen Victoria approved the regiment's style as "Seaforth Highlanders (Ross-shire Buffs, The Duke of Albany's)". The Highland Rifle Militia (which had been raised in Ross-shire by Lord Seaforth in 1798) became the 3rd Battalion, and the Rifle Volunteers in Ross & Cromarty, Sutherland & Caithness, and Morayshire, became the 1st–3rd Volunteer Battalions.

The 1st battalion saw action at the Battle of Tel el-Kebir in September 1882 during the Anglo-Egyptian War. After returning home, the battalion again went abroad in 1896, taking part in the International Occupation of Crete in 1897 and the reconquest of the Sudan, being present at the Battle of Atbara in April and the Battle of Omdurman in September 1898. It then moved to Cairo, and from late 1902 was posted to India, where it was stationed at Nasirabad, Ajmer.

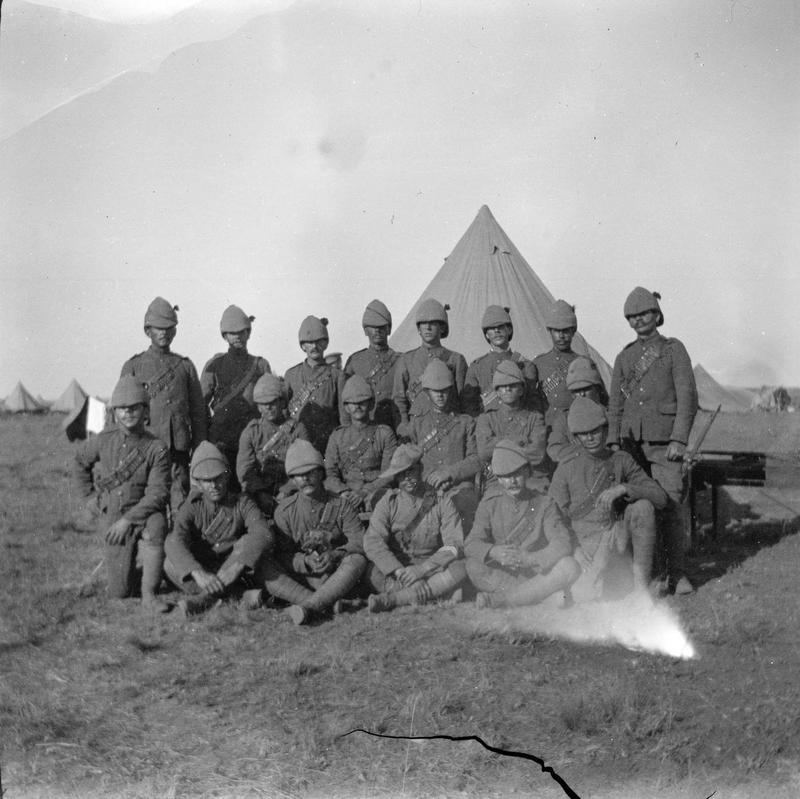
Non-commissioned officers of the Seaforth Highlanders during the Second Boer War.

In 1881, the 2nd battalion was stationed in India. It saw service on the North West Frontier, taking part in the Hazara Expeditions in the summer 1888 and the spring of 1891, and the Chitral Expedition in spring 1895. Returning home in 1897, the outbreak of the Second Boer War saw the 2nd Battalion travel to South Africa in November 1899, suffering heavy losses at the Battle of Magersfontein in December 1899 and at the Battle of Paardeberg in February 1900. They stayed in South Africa throughout the war, which ended in June 1902. 420 officers and men of the battalion returned home on the SS Lake Manitoba in February 1903.

The 3rd (Highland Rifle Militia) battalion was embodied in late 1899, and embarked in February 1900 for service in Egypt alongside the 1st battalion.

In 1908, the Volunteer Force and Militia were reorganised nationally, with the former becoming the Territorial Force and the latter the Special Reserve; the regiment now had one Reserve and three Territorial battalions. In 1909, a former member Clement Mitchell was tried in Bradford for fraud and desertion. Mitchell appeared in court in women's clothing and had been living as a woman after leaving the army.

=== First World War ===
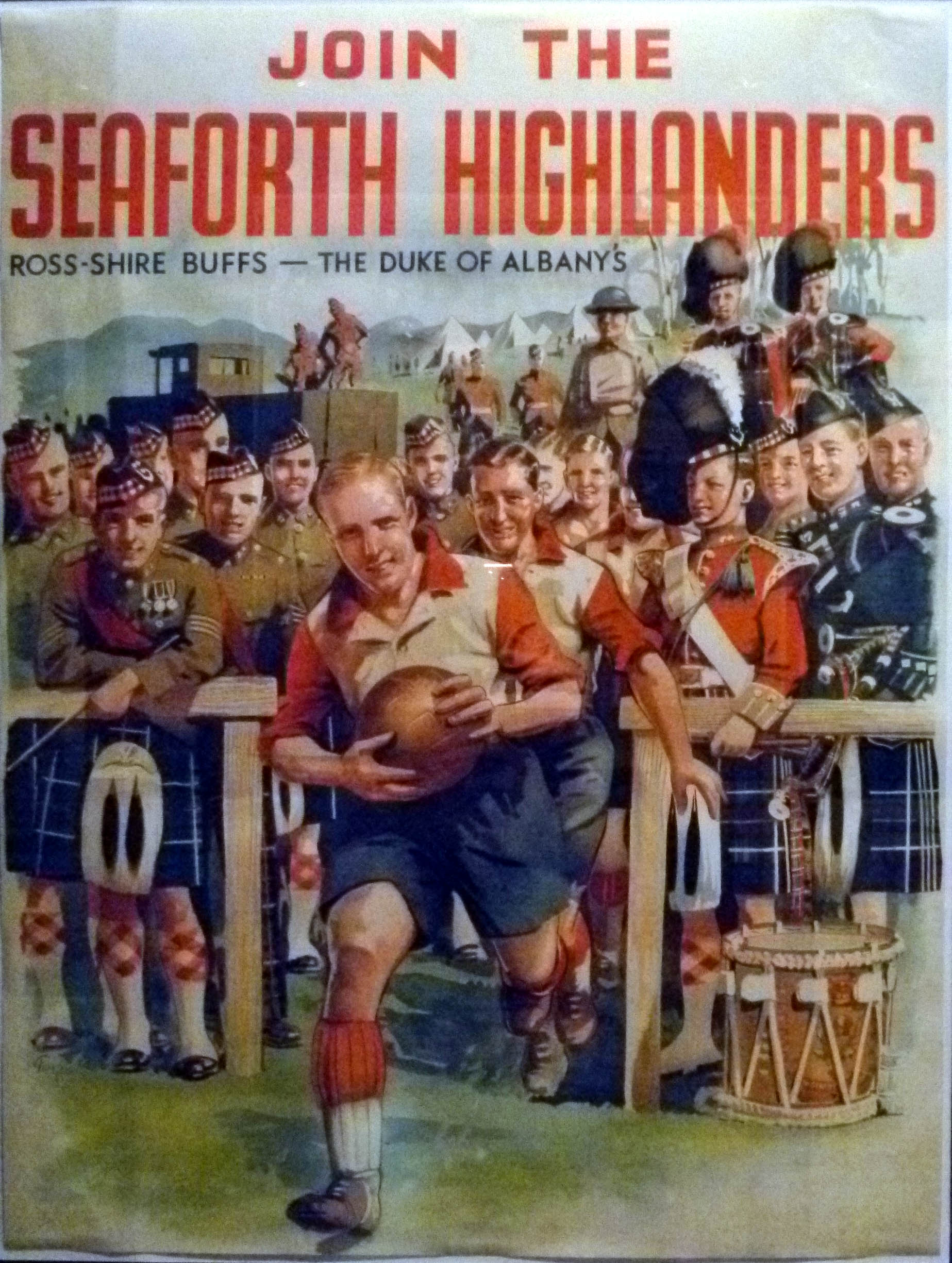
Seaforth Highlanders recruiting poster

==== Regular Army ====
Commanded by Archibald Ritchie, the 1st Battalion, which had been serving in India, landed at Marseille as part of the Dehra Dun Brigade in the Meerut Division in October 1914 for service on the Western Front. It saw action at the Battle of Aubers Ridge in May 1915. The battalion then moved to Mesopotamia in December 1915, where it took part in the Siege of Kut later that month and the Fall of Baghdad in March 1917, before moving to Palestine in January 1918.

The 2nd Battalion, which had been stationed at Shorncliffe Camp, landed at Boulogne-sur-Mer as part of the 10th Brigade in the 4th Division in August 1914. It took part in the retreat from Le Cateau later that month, the Battle of the Marne in September 1914, the Battle of the Aisne also in September 1914 and the Battle of Messines in October 1914. It went on to fight in the Second Battle of Ypres in April 1915, the Battle of the Somme in Autumn 1916 and the Battle of Arras in April 1917. The battalion also saw action at the Battle of Passchendaele in Autumn 1917, the Battle of the Lys in April 1918, the battles of the Hindenburg Line and the final advance in Picardy.

==== Special Reserve ====
The 3rd (Reserve) Battalion served in the Cromarty Garrison for the duration of the war, training reinforcement drafts for the Regular battalions overseas. It also formed 10th (Reserve) Battalion, which carried out the same role for the New Army battalions.

==== Territorial Force ====
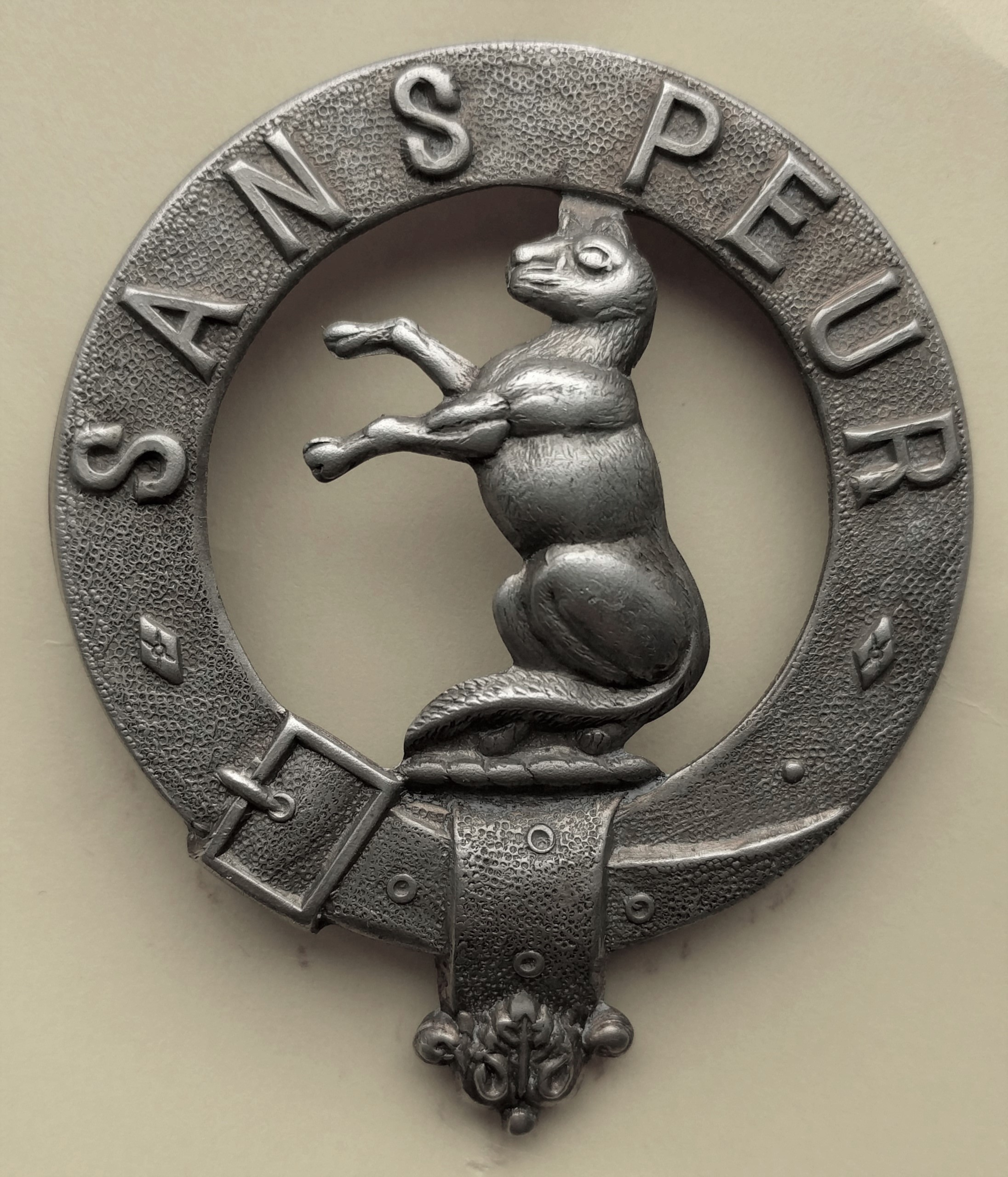
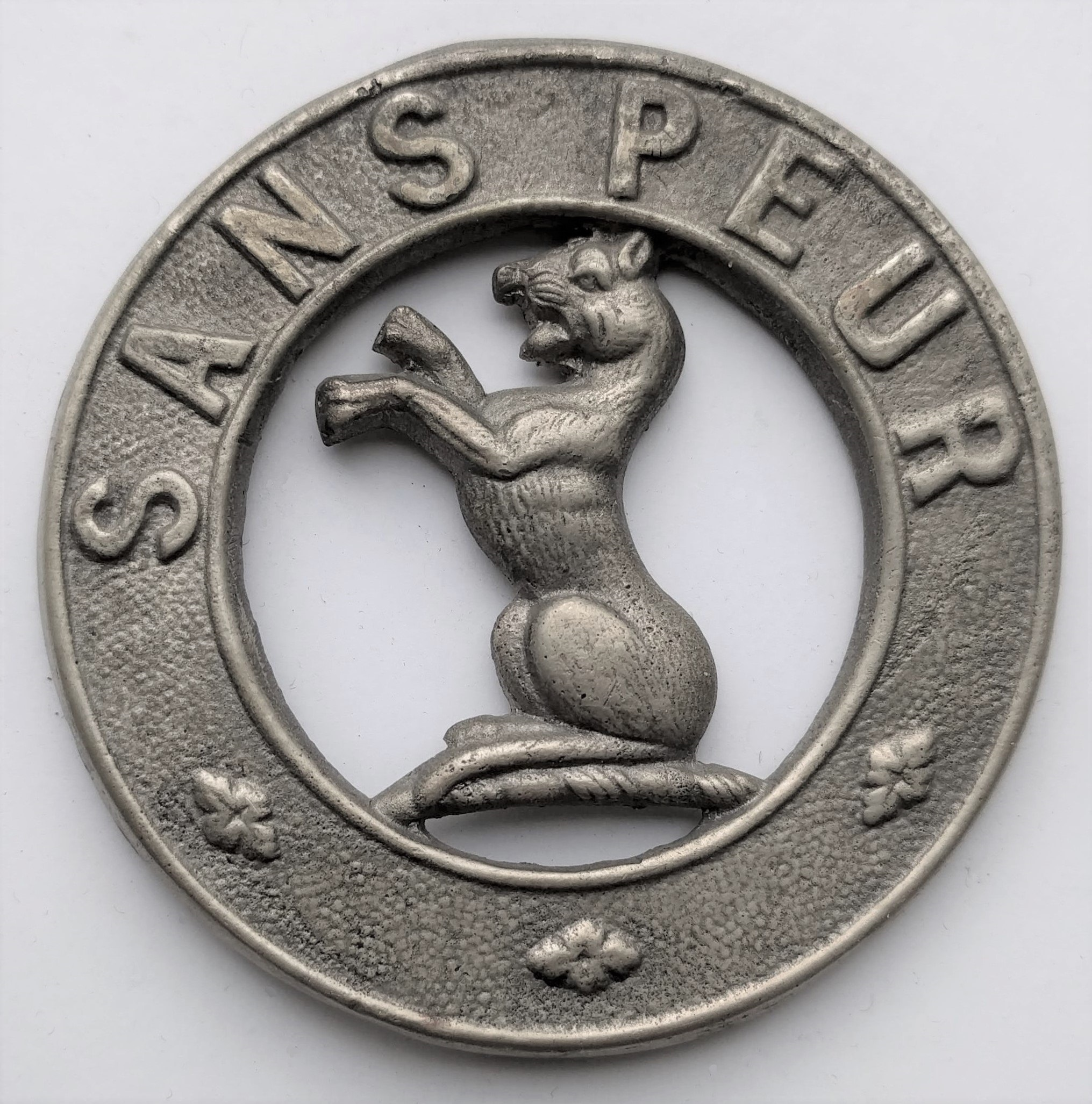
5th (Sutherland and Caithness) Battalion had its own badge: other ranks type: 1908–20; 1921–46

The 1/4th (Ross Highland) Battalion landed at Le Havre as part of the 152nd Brigade in the 51st (Highland) Division in November 1914. The 1/5th (Sutherland and Caithness) Battalion and the 1/6th (Morayshire) Battalion both landed in France as part of the 152nd Brigade in the 51st (Highland) Division in May 1915. All three battalions continued to serve on the Western Front until the end of the war.

==== New Armies ====
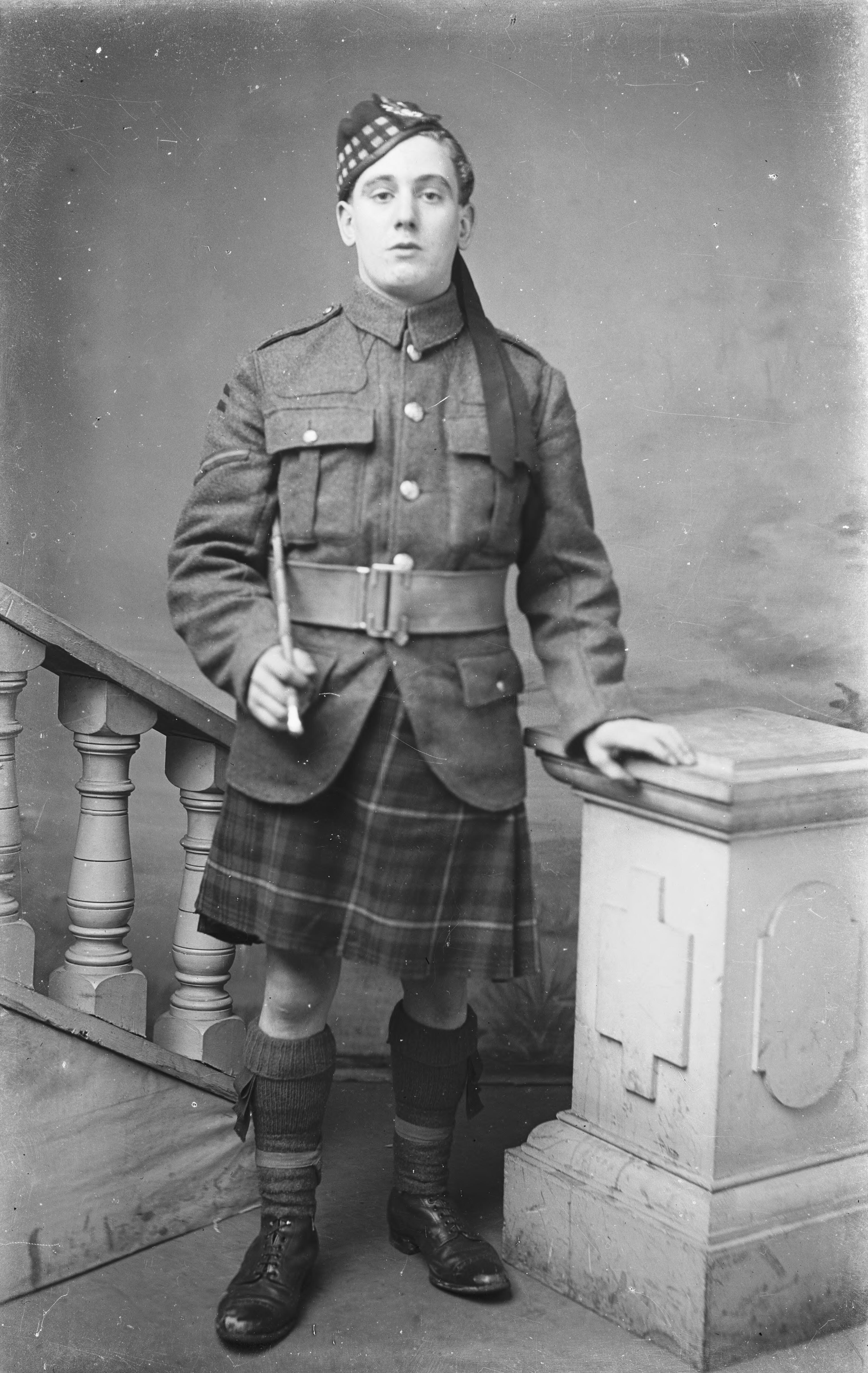
A Seaforth highlander in a Glengarry bonnet during WWI

The 7th (Service) Battalion landed at Boulogne-sur-Mer as part of the 26th Brigade in the 9th (Scottish) Division in May 1915. The 8th (Service) Battalion landed at Boulogne-sur-Mer as part of the 44th Brigade in the 15th (Scottish) Division in July 1915. The 9th (Service) Battalion landed at Boulogne-sur-Mer as part of the pioneer battalion for the 9th (Scottish) Division in May 1915. All three battalions continued to serve on the Western Front until the end of the war.

The 1st Garrison Battalion landed in Salonika as part of the 228th Brigade in the 28th Division in August 1916 for service on the Salonika front.

=== Interwar years ===
The 1st Battalion returned from Egypt in 1919, and in 1921 was deployed to Cowdenbeath and to Bridge of Allan to maintain order during strike action by the miners. It moved to Palestine in 1933 and to Hong Kong in 1937. In March 1938, the 1st Battalion was deployed to Shanghai. Meanwhile, the 2nd Battalion went to India in 1918 and saw action on the North-West Frontier in 1930–31 before moving to Palestine in 1932 and returning to Britain in 1934.

In 1921, the Seaforth's contribution to the Territorial Army was reorganised to comprise a now amalgamated 4/5 battalion, and the 6th battalion. The increase in the size of the Territorials in 1939 led to an expansion to four Seaforth units – the 4th, 5th, 6th and 7th Territorial battalions.

=== Second World War ===
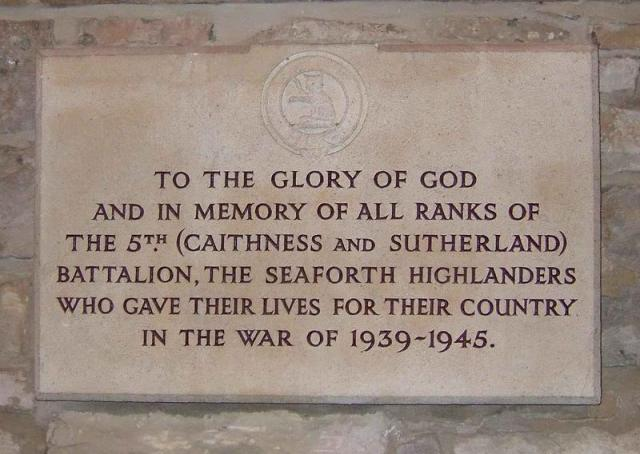
5th Battalion, Seaforth Highlanders plaque. Dornoch Cathedral, Sutherland

The 1st Battalion, which was stationed in Shanghai when war broke out, was deployed to Malaya in November 1940, and then to India. It joined the 1st Indian Brigade in the 23rd Indian Division in May 1942, and served in the Burma Campaign until 1945.

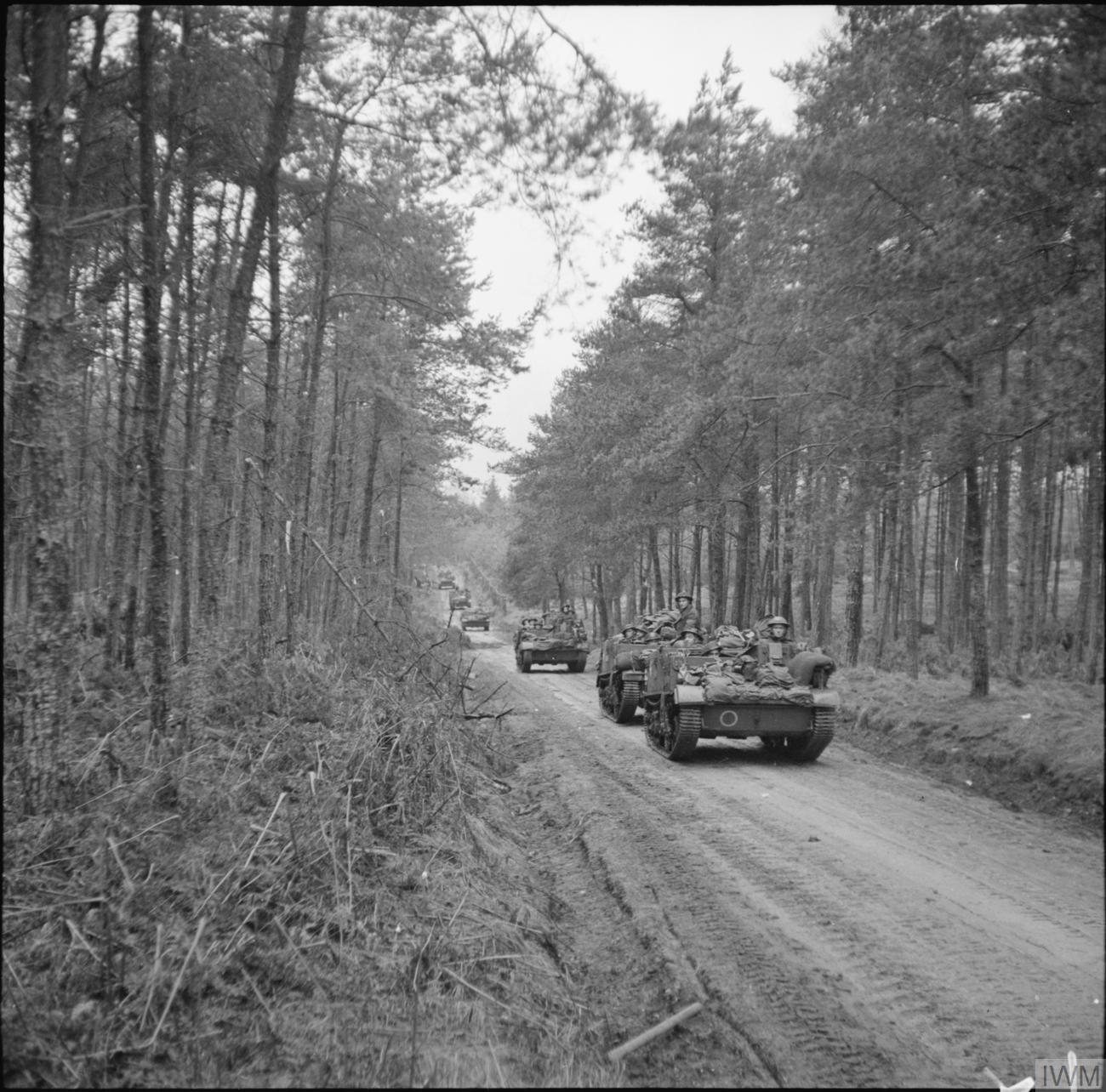
Universal Carriers of the 2nd Battalion, Seaforth Highlanders during Operation Veritable in the Reichswald forest, Germany, 10 February 1945

The 2nd Battalion went to France as part of the 152nd Brigade in the 51st Highland Division with the British Expeditionary Force (BEF) in October 1939 but was captured at Saint-Valery-en-Caux during the Battle of France in June 1940. The 2nd Battalion was reconstituted, as part of the reconstituted 152nd Brigade, 51st (Highland) Infantry Division, and served in the Middle East, fighting in the Second Battle of El Alamein, and the subsequent Tunisia Campaign, and in the Allied invasion of Sicily. In late 1943 the 51st (Highland) Infantry Division returned to the United Kingdom and then took part in Operation Overlord, the Allied invasion of Normandy, taking part in Operation Totalize and Operation Astonia, the capture of the French port of Le Havre. The battalion later participated in Operation Veritable, Operation Plunder and the invasion of Germany.

The 4th Battalion also went to France as part of the 152nd Brigade in the 51st Highland Infantry Division with the BEF in January 1940 and was captured at Saint-Valery-en-Caux in June 1940.

After home service with the 9th (Highland) Infantry Division, in 1940 the 5th Battalion joined the reconstituted 152nd Brigade, 51st Highland Division, and served in the Middle East, in the Allied invasion of Sicily in July 1943, in the Allied invasion of Italy in September 1943 and then in North-West Europe.

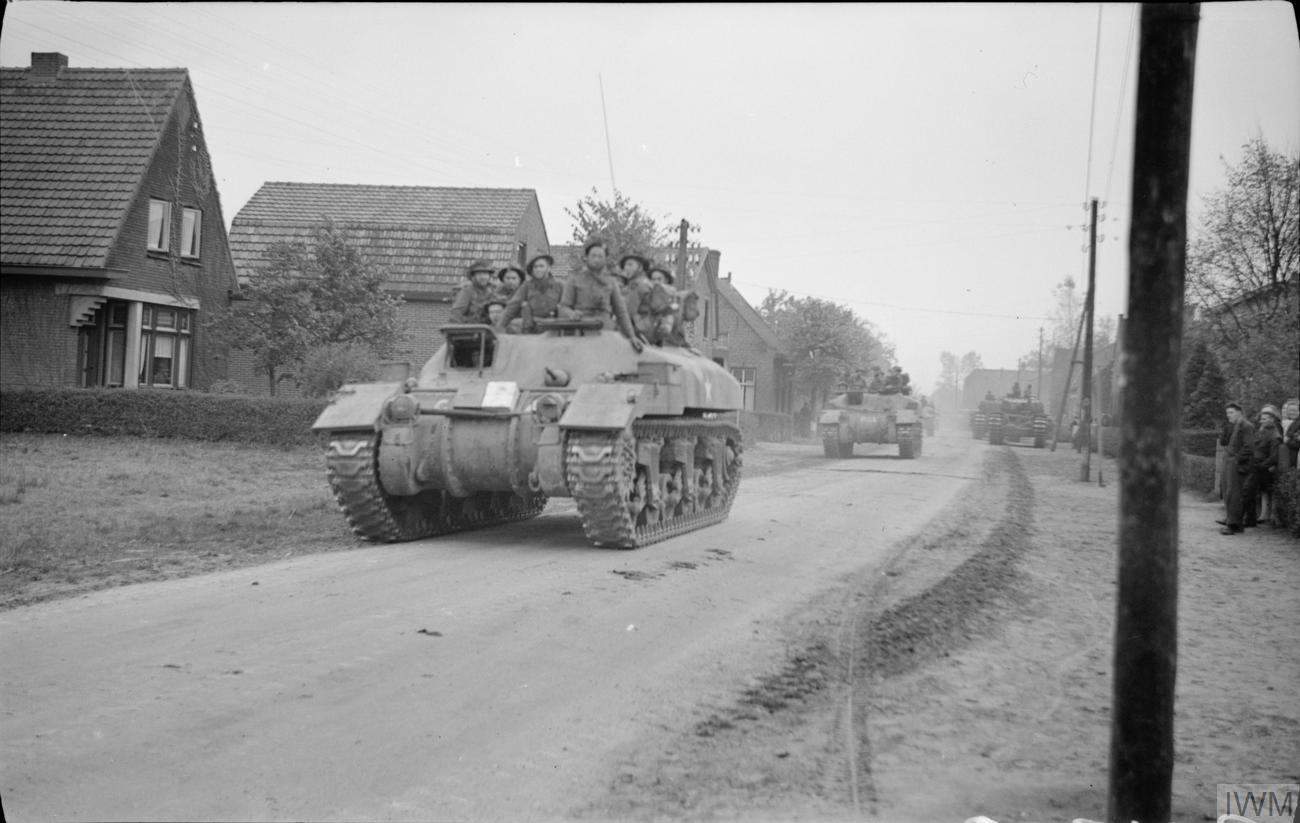
Kangaroos carrying men of the 7th Battalion, Seaforth Highlanders in Moergestel, Netherlands, 26 October 1944.

The 6th Battalion was a 2nd Line TA unit that was transferred to the 17th Infantry Brigade, part of the 5th Infantry Division. It served with the division throughout the war in Sicily, Italy, and finally in Northwest Europe.

The 7th Battalion was a 2nd Line TA unit that originally served with the 26th Infantry Brigade, part of the 9th (Highland) Infantry Division, and later transferred to the 46th (Highland) Infantry Brigade in the 15th (Scottish) Infantry Division and deployed to France in June 1944: it saw action in Operation Epsom and then served in North-West Europe.

The 8th and 9th battalions were raised early in the war, and served in a home defence and reserve role. In December 1941, the 8th was redesignated the 30th battalion, Seaforth Highlanders.

=== Post-war and amalgamation ===
After the end of war, the 1st battalion served in Java before moving to Malaya where, from 1948 until 1951, it took part in internal security operations during the Malayan Emergency. The battalion's postings then included Edinburgh (1951–2), Germany (1952–4), Suez Canal Zone, then Aden (1954–5), Gibraltar (1955–7), and Germany (1957–61).

In 1946 the 2nd battalion moved from Germany to England, where in 1948 it was disbanded, its personnel joining the 1st Battalion.

Post-war, the regiment had one Territorial Army (TA) unit – the 11th battalion, Seaforth Highlanders.

The 1st battalions of the Seaforth and Queen's Own Cameron Highlanders were amalgamated on 7 February 1961 at Redford Barracks to form the 1st battalion Queen's Own Highlanders (Seaforth and Camerons). The TA battalions of both regiments amalgamated in 1967 to form the 3rd (Territorial) battalion Queen's Own Highlanders.

== Battle honours ==
These are the battle honours awarded to the Seaforth Highlanders, together with those of the 72nd and 78th Highlanders. Those borne on the Colours are in bold type.

- 72nd Highlanders: **Carnatic**, **Hindoostan**, **Mysore**, **Cape of Good Hope (1806)**, **South Africa 1835**, **Sevastopol**, **Central India**, **Peiwar Kotal**, **Charasiah**, **Kabul 1879**, **Kandahar 1880**, **Afghanistan 1878–80**
- 78th Highlanders: **Assaye**, **Maida**, **Java**, **Koosh-Ab**, **Persia**, **Lucknow**, **Afghanistan. 1879–80**
- Seaforth Highlanders (1881–1902): **Tel-El-Kebir**, **Egypt 1882**, **Chitral**, **Atbara**, **Khartoum**, **Paardeberg**, **South Africa 1899–1902**
- 3rd (Highland Rifle Militia) Battalion: **Mediterranean 1900–01** (rescinded when it became Special Reserve in 1908)
- The Great War: Le Cateau, Retreat from Mons, **Marne 1914 '18**, Aisne 1914, La Bassée 1914, Armentières 1914, Festubert 1914 '15, Givenchy 1914, Neuve Chapelle, **Ypres 1915 '17 '18**, St. Julien, Frezenberg, Bellewaarde, Aubers, **Loos**, **Somme 1916 '18**, Albert 1916, Bazentin, Delville Wood, Pozières, Flers-Courcelette, Le Transloy, Ancre Heights, Ancre 1916, **Arras 1917 '18**, **Vimy 1917**, Scarpe 1917 '18, Arleux, Pilckem, Menin Road, Polygon Wood, Broodseinde, Poelcapelle, Passchendaele, **Cambrai 1917 '18,** St. Quentin, Bapaume 1918, Lys, Estaires, Messines 1918, Hazebrouck, Bailleul, Kemmel, Béthune, Soissonnais-Ourcq, Tardenois, Drocourt-Quéant, Hindenburg Line, Courtrai, Selle, **Valenciennes**, France and Flanders 1914–18, Macedonia 1917–18, Megiddo, Sharon, **Palestine 1918**, Tigris 1916, Kut al Amara 1917, **Baghdad**, Mesopotamia 1915–18
- The Second World War: Ypres-Comines Canal, Somme 1940, Withdrawal to Seine, **St. Valery-en-Caux**, Odon, Cheux, **Caen**, Troarn, Mont Pincon, Quarry Hill, Falaise, Falaise Road, Dives Crossing, La Vie Crossing, Lisieux, Nederrijn, Best, Le Havre, Lower Maas, Meijel, Venlo Pocket, Ourthe, **Rhineland**, Reichswald, Goch, Moyland, Rhine, Uelzen, Artlenberg, North-West Europe 1940 '44–45, **El Alamein**, Advance to Tripoli, Mareth, Wadi Zigzaou, **Akarit**, Djebel Roumana, North Africa 1942–43, Landing in Sicily, Augusta, Francoforte, Adrano, Sferro Hills, **Sicily 1943**, Garigliano Crossing, **Anzio**, Italy 1943–44, **Madagascar**, Middle East 1942, **Imphal**, Shenam Pass, Litan, Tengnoupal, **Burma 1942–44**

== Victoria Cross recipients ==
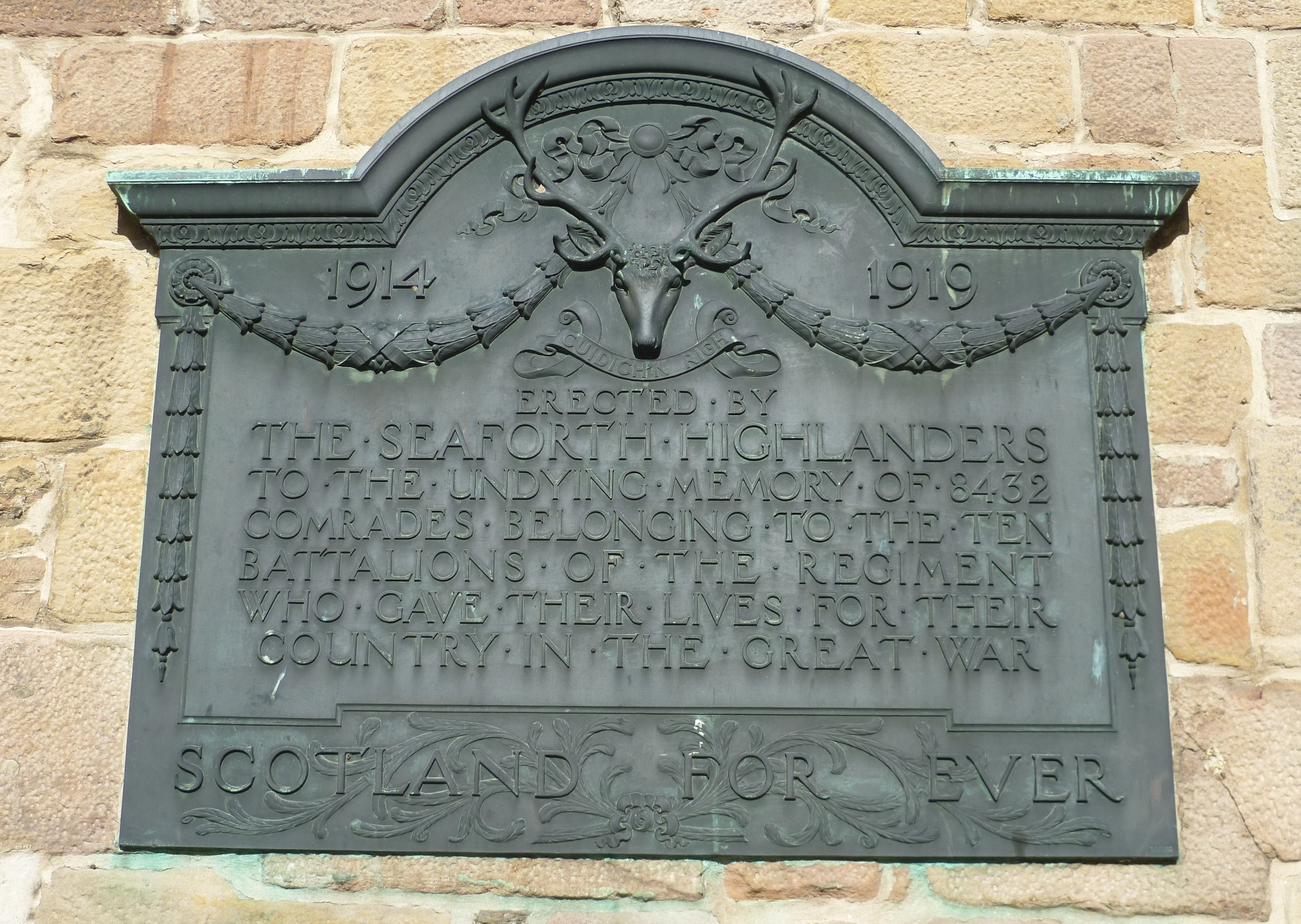
Seaforth Highlanders Great War Memorial plaque in Tain. There are identical plaques above the entrance to the Courthouse in Dornoch, the regiment's former depot at Fort George near Inverness, and the former Territorial Army centre in Elgin, Moray.

The following servicemen from the Seaforth Highlanders were awarded the Victoria Cross:

78th Highlanders

- Andrew Bogle, 1857, Indian Mutiny
- Joseph Crowe, 1857, Indian Mutiny
- Herbert Macpherson, 1857, Indian Mutiny
- Joseph Jee, 1857, Indian Mutiny
- Valentine McMaster, 1857, Indian Mutiny
- Stewart McPherson, 1857, Indian Mutiny
- Henry Ward, 1857, Indian Mutiny
- James Hollowell, 1857, Indian Mutiny

72nd Duke of Albany's Own Highlanders

- Aylmer Cameron, 1858, Indian Mutiny
- George Sellar, 1879, Afghanistan

Seaforth Highlanders

- John MacKenzie, 1900, Ashanti
- Sidney Ware, 1st Battalion, 1916, First World War
- Walter Ritchie, 2nd Battalion, 1916, First World War
- Thomas Steele, 1st Battalion, 1917, First World War
- Donald MacKintosh, 2nd Battalion, 1917, First World War
- Alexander Edwards, 6th Battalion, 1917, First World War
- Robert McBeath, 5th Battalion, 1917, First World War
- John Meikle, MM.4th Battalion, 1918, First World War

== Colonels-in-Chief ==
Colonels-in-chief of the Regiment were:

- 1881–1884: Prince Leopold, Duke of Albany, KG, KT, GCSI, GCMG, KJStJ
- 1905–1917: Prince Charles Edward, Duke of Albany, KG, GCVO (terminated 1917)
- 1920–1936: King Edward VIII (until abdication in 1936)

== Regimental colonels ==
Colonels of the Regiment were:

- 1881–1893 (1st Battalion): Gen. Sir Edward Selby Smyth, KCMG (ex 72nd Foot)
- 1881–1885 (2nd Battalion): F.M. Sir Patrick Grant, GCB, GCMG (ex 78th Foot)
- 1893–1897: Gen. Sir William Parke, KCB
- 1897–1907: Gen. Sir Archibald Alison, Bt., GCB
- 1907–1911: Lt-Gen. Mostyn de la Poer Beresford
- 1911–1914: Gen. Sir George Digby Barker, GCB
- 1914–1924: Maj-Gen. Robert Hunter Murray, CB, CMG
- 1924–1931: Maj-Gen. Sir Colin Mackenzie, KCB
- 1931–1939: Maj-Gen. Sir Archibald Ritchie, KBE, CB, CMG
- 1939–1947: Lt-Gen. Sir William Montgomerie Thomson, KCMG, CB, MC
- 1947–1957: Maj-Gen. Sir John Laurie, 6th Baronet, CBE, DSO
- 1957–1961: F.M. Sir James Cassels, GCB, KBE, DSO (to Queen's Own Highlanders)
- 1961 Regiment amalgamated with The Queen's Own Cameron Highlanders to form the Queen's Own Highlanders (Seaforth and Camerons)

== Sources ==
- Fairrie, Angus (1983). "Cuidich'n Righ": A History of the Queen's Own Highlanders (Seaforth and Camerons). Regimental HQ, Queen's Own Highlanders. ISBN 0950898600.
- J.B.M. Frederick, Lineage Book of British Land Forces 1660–1978, Vol I, Wakefield: Microform Academic, 1984, ISBN 1-85117-007-3.
- Col George Jackson Hay, An Epitomized History of the Militia (The Constitutional Force), London: United Service Gazette, 1905/Ray Westlake Military Books, 1987, ISBN 0-9508530-7-0/Uckfield: Naval & Military Press, 2015 ISBN 978-1-78331-171-2.
- Brig E.A. James, British Regiments 1914–18, London: Samson Books, 1978, ISBN 0-906304-03-2/Uckfield: Naval & Military Press, 2001, ISBN 978-1-84342-197-9.
- Royle, Trevor (2007). Queen's Own Highlanders. A concise history. Mainstream Publishing. ISBN 9781845960926.
- Sym, John M. (1962). Seaforth Highlanders. Gale & Polden. OCLC 1059816697.
- Ray Westlake, Tracing the Rifle Volunteers, Barnsley: Pen and Sword, 2010, ISBN 978-1-84884-211-3.
