= Stewart McPherson (VC) =

Recipient of the Victoria Cross

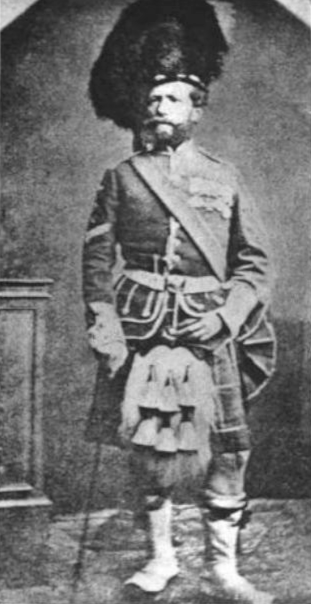
- Born: 1819; Culross, Fife
- Died: 7 December 1892 (aged 72–73); Culross, Fife
- Burial place: Culross Abbey Cemetery
- Military career
- Allegiance: United Kingdom
- Branch: British Army
- Rank: Colour-Sergeant
- Units: 78th Highlanders
- Conflicts: Anglo-Persian War; Indian Mutiny
- Awards: Victoria Cross

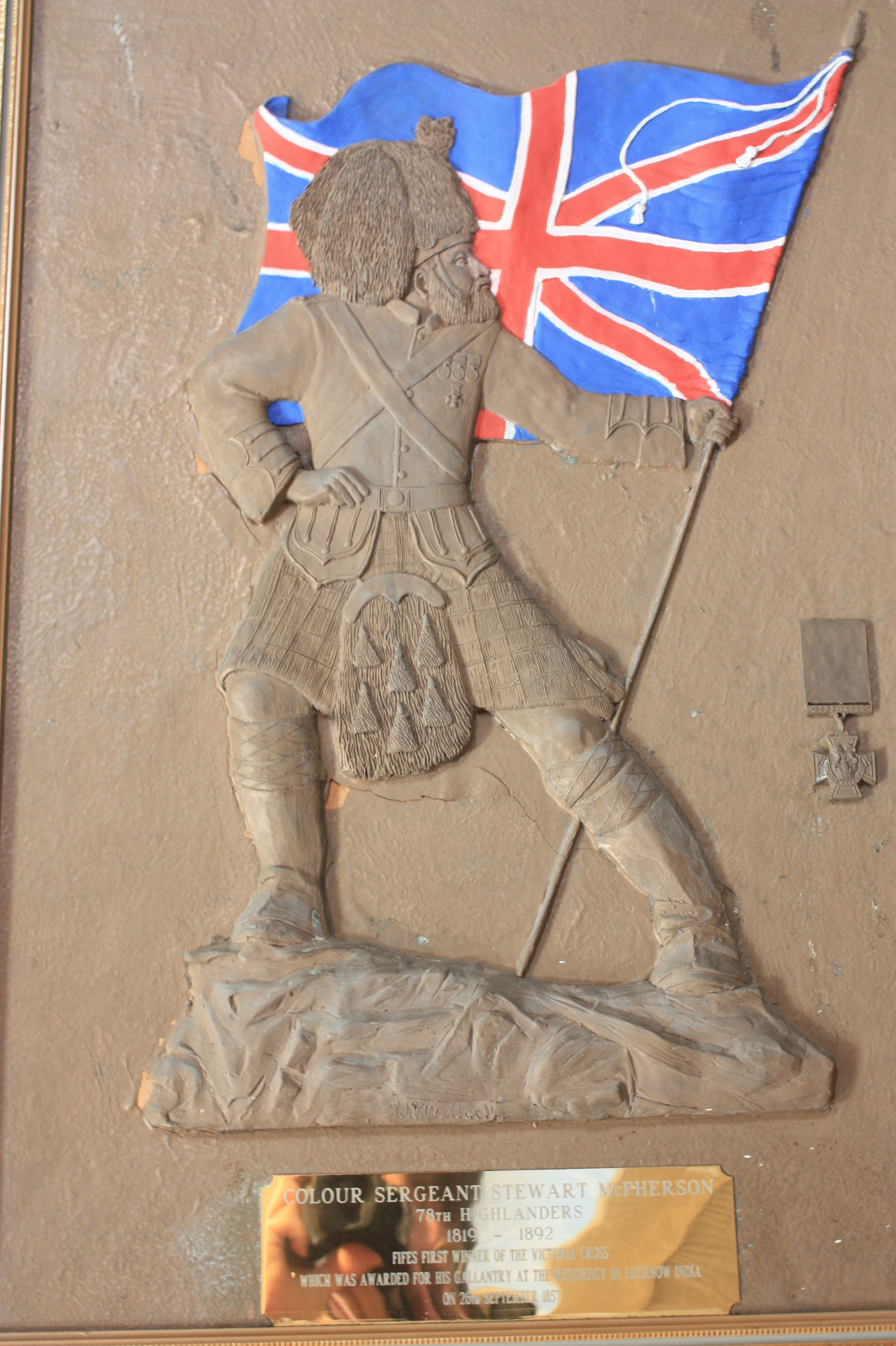
Plaque to Stewart McPherson VC, Culross Parish Church

Stewart McPherson VC (1819 – 7 December 1892) was a Scottish soldier in India and a recipient of the Victoria Cross, the highest and most prestigious award for gallantry in the face of the enemy that can be awarded to British and Commonwealth military forces.

== Life ==
Stewart McPherson was born in Culross in 1819, the son of Mungo McPherson and Mary Smith. He left Geddes Public School in the village at 15 and became an apprentice weaver in nearby Dunfermline, but he was soon lured by adventure and foreign travel. In December 1839, he walked to Stirling to join the British Army's 78th Highlanders, which were later known as the Seaforth Highlanders Ross-shire Buffs, Duke of Albany's.

He married a Culross girl, Elizabeth Haig, in 1848, and the couple went on to have six children - Stewart, Sarah, Eliza, Robina, Ferguson, and McGregor.

McPherson saw action in Persia, India and Ireland before arriving in Bengal, India. He was approximately 38 years old, and now a colour-sergeant. During his time here, his actions during the Siege of Lucknow in the Indian Mutiny earned him the Victoria Cross. His citation reads:

For daring gallantry in the Lucknow Residency on the 26th September, 1857, in having rescued, at great personal risk, a wounded Private of his Company, who was lying in a most exposed situation, under a very heavy fire. Colour-Serjeant McPherson was also distinguished on many occasions by his coolness and gallantry in action.

McPherson was presented with his award by Queen Victoria in December 1880, at Windsor Castle. Only three weeks after receiving his award, he discharged himself from the army and returned to Scotland, where he was appointed superintendent of the Glasgow Industrial Schools based in Bailieston.

A decade later, the family moved again to Culross where they bought a house in Low Valleyfield. As a reminder of his time in India, it was named Lucknow Villa and it was there that he died, aged 70, in 1892.

== Burial ==
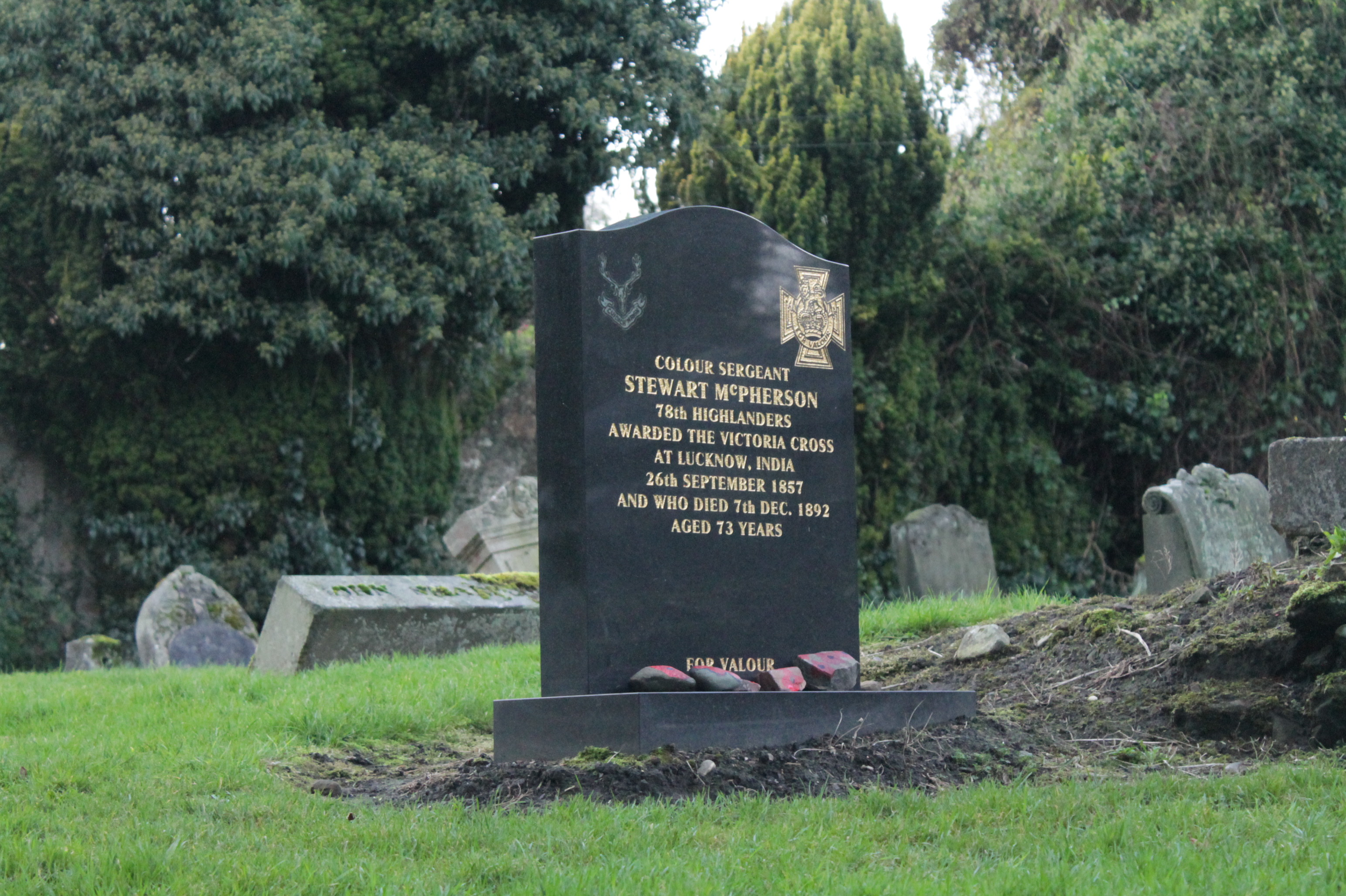
The grave of Stewart McPherson VC, Culross graveyard

McPherson was laid to rest in his town near Dunfermline. He was buried in the Fife County Cemetery, in the shadow of Culross Abbey, but his grave became overgrown. About 143 years after being awarded the Victoria Cross a local woman, Janis Ellis, showed businessman Alan Johnson the war hero's last resting place and he decided his valour should be recognized in his home village. The Fife Council awarded an £1800 grant from the common good fund to pay for a new Indian granite stone - quarried less than 60 miles from Lucknow. The grave lies to the north-west of the church entrance.

A plaque was also unveiled inside Culross Parish Church at a ceremony which was attended by two of his descendants, Mrs. Lylian Edge and Mr Stuart Lamberton, as well as senior Army personnel.

His Victoria Cross is displayed at the Regimental Museum of Queens Own Highlanders, Fort George, Inverness-shire, Scotland.
