= Joseph Jee =

English Victoria Cross recipient (1819–1899)

Joseph Jee VC CB
- Born: 9 February 1819; Hartshill, Warwickshire
- Died: 17 March 1899 (aged 80); Queniborough Hall, Leicestershire
- Burial place: Ratcliffe College, Ratcliffe-on-the-Wreake, Leicestershire
- Military career
- Allegiance: United Kingdom
- Branch: British Army
- Service years: 1842–1868
- Rank: Deputy Surgeon General
- Units: 1st The Royal Dragoons; 78th Regiment; 57th Regiment of Foot; 15th Regiment of Light Dragoons
- Conflicts: Anglo-Persian War; Indian Mutiny; awards: Victoria Cross; Order of the Bath
- Other work: Honorary Surgeon to the Queen

Joseph Jee VC CB (9 February 1819 – 17 March 1899) was an English recipient of the Victoria Cross, the highest and most prestigious award for gallantry in the face of the enemy that can be awarded to British and Commonwealth forces.

== Details ==
Jee was 38 years old, and a surgeon in the 78th Regiment (later The Seaforth Highlanders Ross-shire Buffs, Duke of Albany's), British Army during the Indian Mutiny when the following deed took place on 25 September 1857, at the relief of Lucknow, for which he was awarded the VC:

78th Regiment

Surgeon Joseph Jee, C.B., Date of Act of Bravery, 25th September, 1857

For most conspicuous gallantry and important Services, on the entry of the late Major-General Havelock's relieving force into Lucknow, on the 25th September, 1857, in having during action (when the 78th Highlanders, then in possession of the Char Bagh, captured two 9-pounders at the point of the bayonet), by great exertion and devoted exposure, attended to the large number of men wounded in the charge, whom he succeeded in getting removed on cots and the backs of their comrades, until he had collected the Dooly bearers who had fled. Subsequently, on the same day, in endeavouring to reach the Residency with the wounded men, Surgeon Jee became besieged by an overwhelming force in the Mote-Mehal, where he remained during the whole night and following morning, voluntarily and repeatedly exposing himself to a heavy fire in proceeding to dress the wounded men who fell while serving a 24-pounder in a most exposed situation. He eventually succeeded in taking many of the wounded, through a cross fire of ordnance and musketry, safely into the Residency, by the river-bank, although repeatedly warned not to make the perilous attempt.

== Further information ==
He later achieved the rank of deputy surgeon general.

== The medal ==
His Victoria Cross is displayed at the Army Medical Services Museum, Mytchett, Surrey.
