= Kedopok War =

1813 revolt in East Java

Coordinates: 7°47′S 113°12.5′E

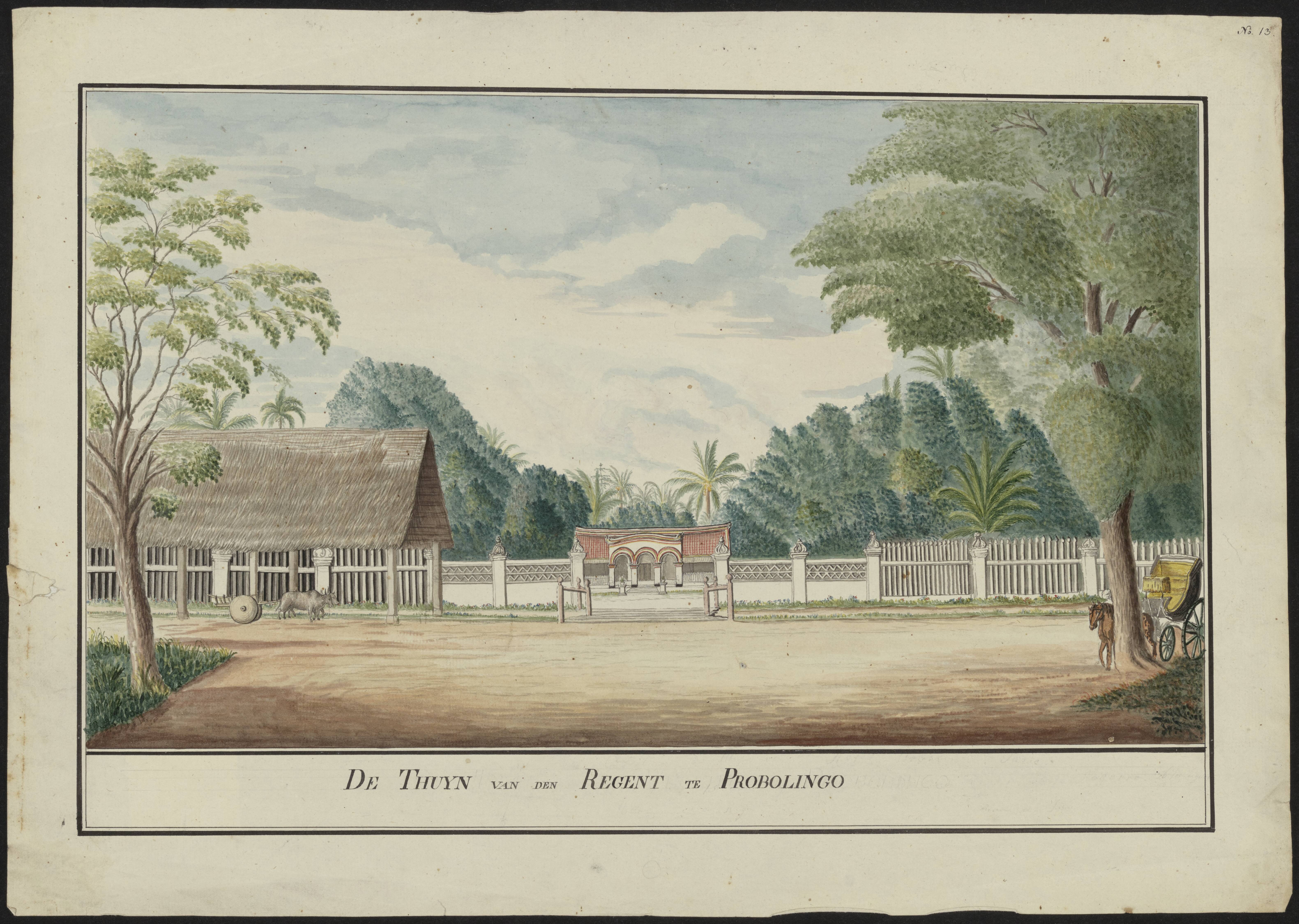
- Han Kik Ko's residence, which was attacked by rebels
| Date | 18–21 May 1813 |
| Location | Probolinggo, East Java |
| Result | British victory |

Belligerents
| Peasant rebels | United Kingdom |

Commanders and leaders
| Demang Muneng † | Lt. Col. James Fraser (executed); Capt. D. MacLeod; Han Kik Ko (executed) |

Strength
| 2,000–5,000 | c. 1,000 troops |

Casualties and losses
| c. 150 killed | Light |

The Kedopok War, also known as Kepruk Cina ("Attack the Chinese"), was a peasant uprising in Probolinggo, East Java, in May 1813 during British rule in Java. The uprising was launched against the rule of local Chinese landlord Han Kik Ko. Several British military officers present in Probolinggo were also killed in the uprising.

Han Kik Ko purchased Probolinggo from the Dutch colonial government in 1811, and levied heavy taxation to finance his purchase. Local unrest against Han Kik Ko's rule ensued, led by the village leader (demang) of Muneng village. Underestimating the scale of the uprising, British officers with Han Kik Ko visited the village, and were surrounded and killed by the rebels. The rebels captured the town of Probolinggo, which the British abandoned. A British column from Surabaya later retook Probolinggo, killing many rebels and their leaders in the process. The colonial administration retook land ownership of Probolinggo and surrounding districts in the aftermath to prevent further uprisings.

== Background ==
In 1811, in order to raise funds, the Franco-Dutch Governor-General of the Dutch East Indies Herman Willem Daendels sold the regency of Probolinggo in Java's eastern salient to Han Kik Ko, the Kapitan Cina of Pasuruan. Probolinggo produced little revenue for the colonial government beforehand, and Han purchased it for the sum of 600 thousand spanish dollars, to be paid in twenty installments. The previous Javanese bupati (regent) was removed from his post, with Han Kik Ko taking the office. In order to finance his payments, Han levied extortionate taxation on Probolinggo's population, in addition to monopolizing the local rice trade through forced purchases. Taxes levied by Han on Probolinggo's farmers reached 50 percent of the harvest.

Around 80,000 people lived in Probolinggo at the time. Probolinggo's locals, highly oppressed by the tax regime, began to gather around Kyai Mas, a religious preacher from Surabaya. A prophecy began to spread in Probolinggo, likely spread by the deposed former regent. The British government in Java (which took over from the Dutch in 1811) had sensed potential trouble brewing in the region, in which it had no stationed garrisons.

== Revolt ==
In May 1813, Han held a party, inviting British officers from Surabaya and Pasuruan. Several British officers attended, including Lt. Col. James Fraser along with Captains McPherson and Cameron of the 78th Regiment garrisoned in Surabaya. To the southwest of Probolinggo, however, a group of villagers were gathering under the Demang (village chief) of Muneng, who had received punishment under Han's regency. On 18 May, this group numbering around 2,000 men began marching towards the town of Probolinggo, seizing the village of Kedopok which was located 2 or 3 miles away from Han's home. As his party concluded, Han received news of this activity. Both Han and the British were unaware of the scale of the revolt, and the British officers decided to accompany Han who went to the village with an escort of 200 pikemen.

Upon arrival, the group found the rebels encamped at a coffee plantation. As they attempted to parley with the group, they were attacked, and Han's troops quickly fled. Han along with the British officers attempted to escape to Han's home. During the retreat, Han, Fraser and McPherson were surrounded by the rebels, and were captured. Escaping from Han's home, Cameron had 100 European troops and 120 djajeng-sekar (native colonial police) soldiers sent from Pasuruan upon arrival at the town of Probolinggo. Deeming this insufficient to hold against the rebels – whose numbers have reportedly grown up to 5,000 – he decided to evacuate by sea to Pasuruan after receiving news of Han's and the captured officers' execution by the rebels. Han's house was quickly emptied and inhabitants and guests (including Fraser's wife) fled by boat to Pasuruan.

At Surabaya, upon receiving news of the uprising, a British force was assembled including 300 Scottish soldiers of the 78th Regiment and 500 Sepoy soldiers of the Bengal Army, supplemented by a group of Javanese troops. The force departed for Pasuruan on 20 May, arriving just after midnight. At Pasuruan, they met Cameron and his soldiers, before moving on to Probolinggo. The British force was under the command of Capt. D. McLeod, British garrison commander in Surabaya. At the same time, the rebels had managed to acquire several pieces of artillery and were moving to Pasuruan.

On the morning of 21 June, after the British had broken through a rebel roadblock, a mostly spear-armed rebel force of around 2,500 encountered the British column and charged. The charge was repelled by British volley fire, and the rebels retreated after losing some 150 men killed. One of the rebel leaders were killed, and a further two were captured and executed. British casualties were several wounded. With the loss of the leaders, the rebel force occupying Probolinggo dispersed, and the town was taken by the British without further fighting. The British recovered the bodies of Fraser and MacPherson, burying them in Probolinggo's town square and erecting a monument.

== Aftermath ==
After the uprising had been suppressed, British lieutenant-governor for Java Stamford Raffles ordered an investigation into the causes of the uprising. Leading the inquiry was John Crawfurd, who focused on local grievances and described Han's behavior in Probolinggo as "monstrous", attributing it as the primary cause of the revolt. He also reported to Raffles a similar, though less oppressive, situation in neighboring districts such as Besuki and Panarukan. His report ultimately recommended the repurchase of Probolinggo, Besuki, and Panarukan by the colonial government. This would be done in 1814, with Probolinggo being purchased from Han's children in exchange for a lifetime pension (amounting, in total, to less than 100,000 Spanish dollars) while Besuki and Panarukan were purchased from Han Chan Piet in exchange for 400 thousand Spanish dollars.

The graves of Fraser and McPherson today remains in Probolinggo, at the grounds of a local government building. Their graves were preserved under the Dutch colonial government, and to a lesser extent in the new Indonesian government, before being relocated during the New Order period.
