= Joseph Petrus Hendrik Crowe =

- Born: 12 January 1826; Uitenhage, Cape Colony
- Died: 12 April 1876 (aged 50); Penge, Surrey, England
- Burial place: MOTH Garden of Remembrance, Uitenhage, South Africa
- Military career
- Allegiance: United Kingdom
- Branch: British Army
- Rank: Lieutenant colonel
- Units: 78th Regiment of Foot; 10th Regiment of Foot
- Conflicts: Indian Mutiny
- Awards: Victoria Cross

Lieutenant colonel Joseph Petrus Hendrik Crowe VC (12 January 1826 – 12 April 1876) was the second South African-born recipient of the Victoria Cross (after Christopher Teesdale VC), the highest and most prestigious award for gallantry in the face of the enemy that can be awarded to British and Commonwealth forces.

== Details ==
He was 31 years old, and a lieutenant in the 78th Regiment of Foot, British Army during the Indian Mutiny, when the following deed took place, for which he was awarded the VC.

On 12 August 1857 at Boursekee Chowkee, the entrenched village in front of Busherutgunge, India, the redoubt was occupied by the enemy, who were causing heavy casualties among the 18th Regiment. It was decided to take the place by storm, and the Highlanders dashed forward, Lieutenant Crowe being the first in, followed by his men. In less than a minute the redoubt was captured.

== His death ==
On 23 October 1875 he was promoted to the rank of lieutenant colonel, commanding the 1st Battalion of Foot. He was due to return home to South Africa in 1876 and contracted a chill while snipe shooting in the Irish bogs. He died on 12 April 1876 in Penge, Surrey and was interred in a non-descript grave in the West Norwood Cemetery. In 1957, his overgrown grave was found and in August 1976 his remains were exhumed. A grand return was planned and on 5 February 1977, following a quasi-military ceremony in St Katherine's Anglican Church, his casket was carried on a gun carriage, followed by descendants of his sisters, to the MOTH Garden of Remembrance, Uitenhage, where his remains were reinterred.

== The medal ==
At his death, his eldest sister Maria Margaret Lister inherited his medals and another sister, Dorothya Susanna Lovemore inherited his sword. Margaret stored his medals in a wall cupboard in her home, "Firlands", Rondebosch, but they were forever lost when the home was destroyed by fire. The medals were not recovered, but the sword has remained in the Lovemore family.
