= Al Hamed =

Al Ḩammād al Gharbī الحماد الغربي Al Hamed
- Village
- Location within Egypt
- Coordinates: 31°20′02″N 30°26′35″E
- Country: Egypt
- Governorate: Beheira
- Time zone: UTC+2 (EET)
  - Summer (DST): UTC+3 (EEST)

Al Ḩammād al Gharbī (Arabic: الحماد الغربي) also known as Al Hamed is a town in Beheira Governorate in Egypt near Rosetta.

On 21 April 1807, forces loyal to Muhammad Ali defeated a small British force here during the Alexandria expedition of 1807.
