= Fort George, Highland =

Military fortress near Ardresier, Scotland

Fort George
- Ardersier, Highland, Scotland
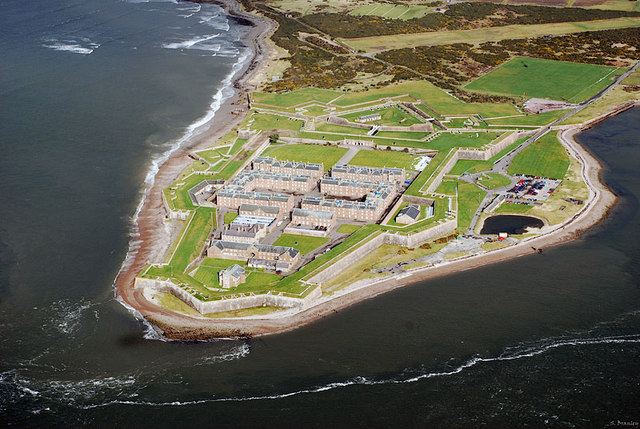
- Fort George from the air

Site information
- Type: Georgian Bastion fort
- Owner: Ministry of Defence
- Operator: British Army

Location
- Location within Inverness-shire
- Coordinates: 57°35′02″N 4°04′13″W
- Height: Up to 12 metres (39 ft)

Site history
- Built: 1748–1769
- Built for: War Office
- In use: 1757-Present
- Materials: Sandstone
- Events: Built after the Jacobite rising of 1745

Garrison information
- Occupants: The Black Watch, 3rd Battalion The Royal Regiment of Scotland

Fort George is a large 18th-century fortress near Ardersier, to the north-east of Inverness in the Highland council area of Scotland. It was built to control the Scottish Highlands in the aftermath of the Jacobite rising of 1745, replacing a Fort George in Inverness constructed after the 1715 Jacobite rising to control the area. The current fortress has never been attacked and has remained in continuous use as a garrison.

The fortification is based on a star design; it remains virtually unaltered and nowadays is open to visitors with exhibits and facsimiles showing the fort's use at different periods, while still serving as an army barracks.

== Old Fort George ==
In 1726, the first fortification known as Fort George was completed in Inverness on the orders of General George Wade. The Georgian fort, which stood on a hillock beside the River Ness, incorporated portions of a medieval castle that had been started by Malcolm III of Scotland in the late 11th century. In the 17th century, Oliver Cromwell strengthened the castle with a citadel but it had been abandoned by the start of the 18th century. Wade's Fort George was capable of housing 400 troops. The first commanding officer of the original Fort George was Sir Robert Munro, 6th Baronet, Colonel of the 42nd Royal Highlanders (Black Watch) and chief of the Highland Clan Munro.

During the 1745 rising the fort was besieged by three thousand Jacobites. Cut off and unable to be relieved by Crown forces, Fort George was surrendered in February 1746 after mines had reached the outer walls. The victorious besiegers blew up the fort to prevent it being reused as a military base by the British Army.

In 1747, following the Crown victory at the Battle of Culloden, Colonel William Skinner, the King's Military Engineer for North Britain, was given a contract to rebuild Fort George. The decision was taken to build the new Fort George at a location 10 mi (16 km) away from Inverness at the mouth of the Moray Firth. The site of Old Fort George lay abandoned for almost 70 years, until in the mid 19th century a red sandstone castellated building called Inverness Castle was built on the fort's former site. Despite its towers and battlements, Inverness Castle had no military purpose. It was used as a prison, and courthouse with complementary bastioned enclosing walls.

== Siting and construction ==
The site chosen was a level spit of land at Ardersier, about 11 miles (18 km) northeast of Inverness, which forms a promontory jutting into the Moray Firth and controls the sea approach to Inverness. With its own harbour below the walls, the fort could be supplied by sea in the event of a siege.

Work began in 1748, with Colonel Skinner in charge, and the Adam brothers, John, Robert and later James, acting as contractors, overseeing around 1,000 soldiers who provided labour and defended the site against attack. By 1757 the main defences were in place, and Fort George was finally completed in 1769. The original budget was £92,673 19s 1d, but the final cost was more than £200,000, a vast figure at the time.

== Fortifications ==
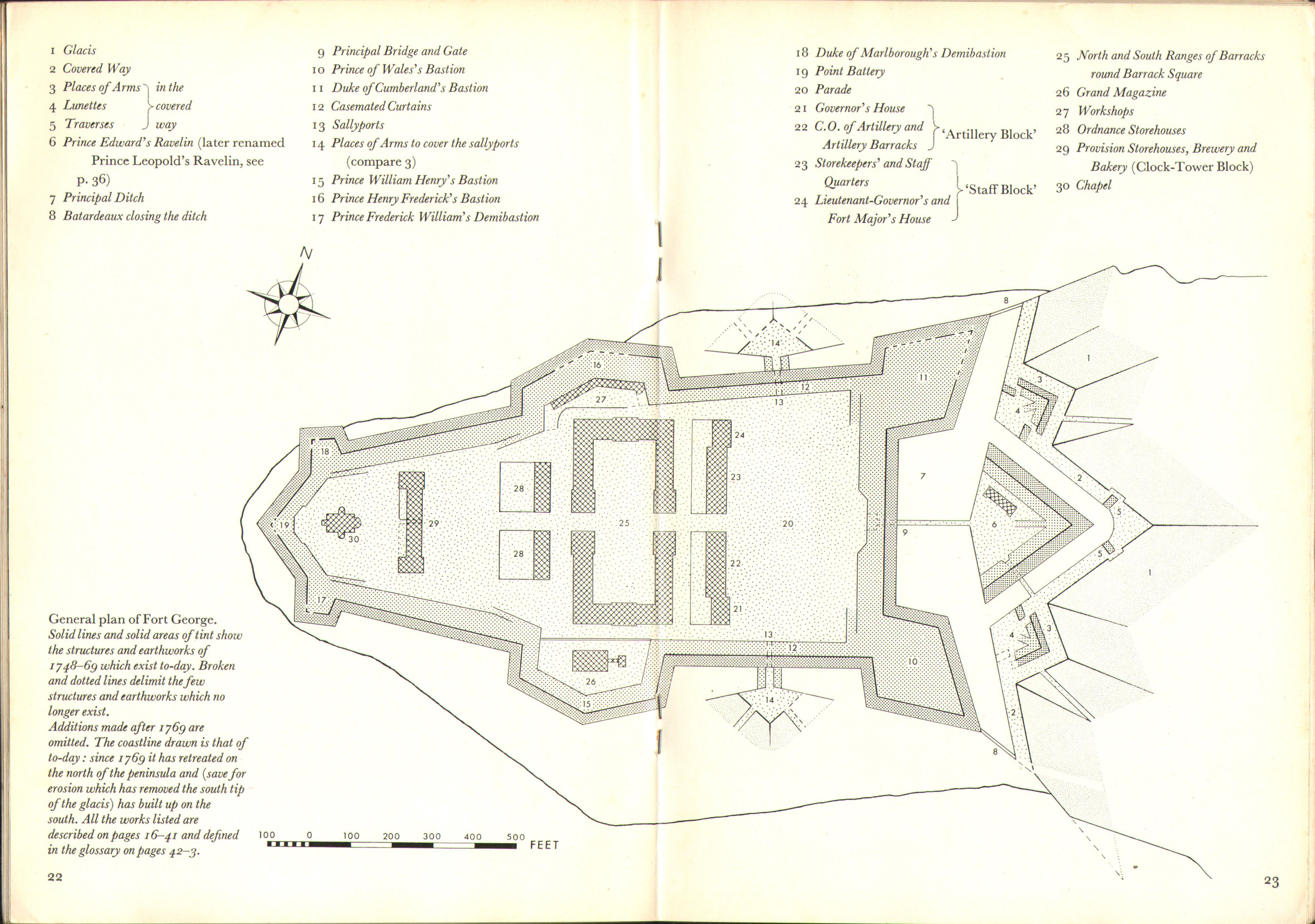
General plan of the fort.

The fortifications form an example of defence in depth. The main walls are stone-faced, in plan faceted and angled with projecting bastions and redoubts so that every wall face is covered by fire from guns sited on top of other walls. The walls are many yards wide and grassed over, on top of barrel-vaulted casemates which form underground bunkers designed to protect the entire garrison from artillery fire. The approach to the fortress from the landward side is across a wide area of loose shingle which creates a protective barrier.

Sloping grassy banks designed to absorb artillery shells all but hide the fort from view. The entrance is reached via a ravelin, a free-standing defensive structure incorporating a guardhouse and completely exposed to fire from the main fort, then by a raised wooden walkway, complete with drawbridge, bridging across a wide ditch set between heavily defended bastions. The ditch forms a wide killing ground openly exposed to gunfire from these walls. The overall effect has been described as "a harmony of pure reason and serene menace".

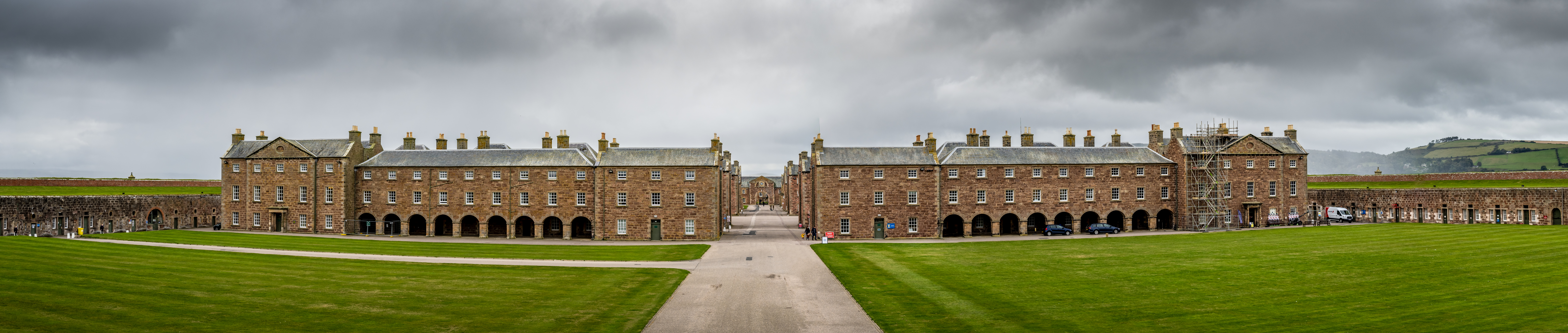
Barracks buildings, Fort George

== Operational use ==
Following the Childers Reforms, the 72nd (Highland) Regiment of Foot and the 78th (Highlanders) Regiment of Foot amalgamated to form the Seaforth Highlanders with its depot in the barracks in 1881. In 1961 the regiment amalgamated with the Queen's Own Cameron Highlanders to form the Queen's Own Highlanders (Seaforth and Camerons): the new regiment formed its depot at Fort George at that time. The barracks became the home of the Black Watch, 3rd Battalion, Royal Regiment of Scotland in 2007.

In November 2016 the Ministry of Defence announced that the site would close in 2032, with Defence Minister Sir Michael Fallon commenting that it was no longer needed because the Highland rebellions are over. This was later delayed to 2033.

== Visitor access ==
The barracks are still in use as a military establishment, but much of the site is open to the public (entrance charge). Historic Environment Scotland use part of one of the barracks to display reconstructions of life in the early days of the fort, and the Grand Magazine displays the Seafield Collection of Arms as well as forming a stage for actors recreating the lives and stories of soldiers in the 18th century. The site received 76,169 visitors during 2019.

=== Highlanders' Museum (Queen's Own Highlanders Collection) ===
The former Lieutenant Governors’ House is home to the Highlanders' Museum, the official regimental museum of the Queen's Own Highlanders and Lovat Scouts. The exhibits include uniforms, weapons, medals, First World War memorial plaques known as "death pennies", photographs, paintings, memorabilia and regimental regalia. Displays include the history of the regiments, their links to the clans, the Highland charge, Sergeant Alexander Edwards and other notable regimental members, and the regiments' activities in different conflicts. The regimental Chapel is also open to visitors, and features many regimental colours and memorials.

== See also ==
- Armed forces in Scotland
- Military history of Scotland
