= List of shipwrecks in October 1844 =

The list of shipwrecks in October 1844 includes ships sunk, foundered, wrecked, grounded, or otherwise lost during October 1844.

== 1 October ==
List of shipwrecks: 1 October 1844
Ship	State	Description
Albion	(United Kingdom of Great Britain and Ireland) British North America	The ship was lost near "Gaberus". She was on a voyage from Saint John's, Newfoundland to Pictou, Nova Scotia. She was on a voyage from London to Bombay, India.
Ceylon	United Kingdom	The ship was wrecked on the Cherbaman Reef, in the Indian Ocean off the Laccadive Islands. Her crew survived.
Churchill	United Kingdom	The ship ran aground in Newport Bay. She was on a voyage from Liverpool, Lancashire to Harwich, Essex. She was later refloated and resumed her voyage.
Convoy	United States	The ship was wrecked on the Luconia Shoals, in the South China Sea.
Mary	United Kingdom	The ship was driven ashore at Southsea, Hampshire. She was refloated and taken in to Portsmouth, Hampshire.
Osprey	(United Kingdom of Great Britain and Ireland) British North America	The ship was abandoned. Her crew were rescued by Facia (United Kingdom).
Parkfield	United Kingdom	The ship ran aground in the River Thames at Erith, Kent. She was on a voyage from London to Port Phillip, South Australia. She was refloated and put in to Gravesend, Kent.
Pollux	United Kingdom	The ship struck rocks at Newton-by-the-Sea, Northumberland and sank.
Rayo	Spain	The government schooner was sunk by British cannons off Europa Point, Gibraltar whilst attacking a Gibraltarian coaster and failing to show her colours. Her crew were rescued by a Portuguese vessel.

== 2 October ==
List of shipwrecks: 2 October 1844
Ship	State	Description
Nixon	United Kingdom	The ship ran aground on the Cockle Sand, in the North Sea off the coast of Norfolk. She was on a voyage from Seaham, County Durham to London. She was later refloated and resumed her voyage.
Vesta	United Kingdom	The ship ran aground on the Swine Bottoms. She was on a voyage from Ipswich, Suffolk to Memel, Prussia. She was refloated and put in to Helsingør, Denmark for repairs.

== 3 October ==
List of shipwrecks: 3 October 1844
Ship	State	Description
Drie Gebroeders	Hamburg	The ship sprang a leak and foundered in the North Sea. Her crew were rescued. She was on a voyage from Newcastle upon Tyne, Northumberland, United Kingdom to Hamburg.
Huntcliffe	United Kingdom	The ship ran aground at Cardigan. She was on a voyage from Quebec City, Province of Canada, British North America to Cardigan.
Johanna	Danzig	The ship driven ashore on Öland, Sweden. She was on a voyage from Danzig to Saint Petersburg, Russia. She was refloated and resumed her voyage.
Mariner	United Kingdom	The ship was driven ashore at "Sommeroe", Grand Duchy of Finland. She was on a voyage from Kronstadt, Russia to Hull, Yorkshire. Mariner was refloated on 5 October.
Mississippi	United States	The ship ran aground at New Orleans, Louisiana.

== 4 October ==
List of shipwrecks: 4 October 1844
Ship	State	Description
Alexander	United States	The brig was driven ashore at Cárdenas, Cuba.
Alexander	Republic of Texas	The ship was driven ashore and sank at Grand Saline.
Artebosite	Republic of Texas	The ship was driven ashore at Grand Saline.
Avisa Oneta	Spain	The brig was wrecked on the Playa de Chivos, off the coast of Cuba with the loss of all but six of her crew. She was on a voyage from Havana, Cuba to Barcelona, Spain.
Betsey Hall	Republic of Texas	The ship was driven ashore at Grand Saline.
Cubano	Spanish Navy	The Brig of War was wrecked on the Bucanas Reefs, off the coast of Cuba, with the loss of a crew member.
Ebro	France	The ship was wrecked on the Salado reef, off the coast of Cuba. Her crew were rescued. She was on a voyage from New Orleans, Louisiana to Havre de Grâce, Seine-Inférieure.
Esther	United Kingdom	The ship departed from Liverpool, Lancashire for Dordrecht, South Holland, Netherlands. No further trace, presumed foundered with the loss of all hands.
George	United States	The brig was driven ashore at Cárdenas.
John Clifton	United Kingdom	The ship struck the Schaarhorn Reef, in the North Sea and sank. Her crew were rescued. She was on a voyage from Cardiff, Glamorgan to Hamburg.
Juanito	Spain	The brig was wrecked at Camarioca, Cuba with some loss of life. She was on a voyage from Puerto Rica to Havana.
Kerswell	United States	The ship was driven ashore and wrecked at Porta Nova Point, Nova Scotia, British North America with the loss of a crew member. She was on a voyage from Boston, Massachusetts to Miramichi, New Brunswick, British North America.
Laura	United Kingdom	The ship was wrecked on the Scroby Sands, Norfolk. Her crew were rescued. She was on a voyage from Ipswich, Suffolk to Blyth, Northumberland.
Leonara	(United Kingdom of Great Britain and Ireland) British North America	The ship was driven ashore in Spray Cove, Prince Edward Island. She was on a voyage from Prince Edward Island to Halifax, Nova Scotia.
Nancy	United Kingdom	The ship foundered in the North Sea off Peterhead, Aberdeenshire. Her crew were rescued. She was on a voyage from Alloa, Clackmannanshire to Ballantrae, Ayrshire.
Natchez	United States	The steamship was driven ashore on the coast of Cuba.
Ophelia	United Kingdom	The brig was driven ashore and wrecked at Thyborøn, Denmark with the loss of all hands. She was on a voyage from Cardiff to Saint Petersburg, Russia.
Paulinus	Sweden	The ship was driven ashore and wrecked near Warnemünde, Prussia. Her crew were rescued. She was on a voyage from Kalmar to Rendsburg, Duchy of Schleswig.
Sincerity	United Kingdom	The ship was driven ashore at Aberystwyth, Cardiganshire. She was on a voyage from Aberystwyth to Flint. She was later refloated.
Tessen	United States	The steamship was driven onto the Punta Gorda Reef, off the coast of Cuba.
Tyne	United Kingdom	The ship was driven ashore at Margate, Kent. She was on a voyage from New Zealand to London. She was refloated and resumed her voyage.
Zaragozam	Spain	The brig was wrecked in the Cove of Banta, Cuba. There were only two or three survivors. She was on a voyage from Havana to A Coruña.

== 5 October ==
List of shipwrecks: 5 October 1844
Ship	State	Description
Adolph	Hamburg	The ship was driven ashore at Matanzas, Cuba. She had been refloated by 12 October.
Africanus	(United Kingdom of Great Britain and Ireland) Jamaica	The schooner was wrecked at Jamaica.
Agawart	United States	The schooner was driven ashore and wrecked in the Bay of Matanzas.
Aimable	(Spain) Cuba	The ship was wrecked off Cárdenas. She was on a voyage from Havana to Baracoa.
Alabama	United States	The ship was wrecked at Havana.
Albion	(United Kingdom of Great Britain and Ireland) British North America	The schooner was wrecked at Havana.
Alpha	(United Kingdom of Great Britain and Ireland) Jamaica	The ship was wrecked in a hurricane at Jamaica.
Andrea	(Spain) Cuba	The ship was wrecked off Cárdenas. She was on a voyage from "Segua" to Havana.
Arago	France	The ship was driven onto the Punta Reef, off the coast of Cuba and foundered.
Australian	(United Kingdom of Great Britain and Ireland) New South Wales	The steamship struck a rock off Melsom's Point and foundered.
Britannia	United Kingdom	The schooner was driven ashore at Key West, Florida Territory. She had been refloated by 9 October.
Britannia	(United Kingdom of Great Britain and Ireland) British North America	The schooner was wrecked at Havana.
Bytown	United Kingdom	The ship was wrecked at Havana.
Carmen	Spain	The ship was wrecked off Cárdenas.
Carrier	(Spain) Cuba	The ship was wrecked off Cárdenas. She was on a voyage from "Segua" to Havana.
Centilla	(Spain) Cuba	The schooner was driven ashore and damaged in the Bay of Matanzas.
Cissia	(United Kingdom of Great Britain and Ireland) Jamaica	The sloop was severely damaged or wrecked at Jamaica.
Conchita	(Spain) Cuba	The schooner was driven ashore in the Bay of Matanzas.
Cruikston Castle	United Kingdom	The ship was wrecked at Havana.
Cyrus	United Kingdom	The barque was wrecked at Havana.
Eliza	(United Kingdom of Great Britain and Ireland) Bahamas	The sloop was driven ashore and wrecked at Matanzas.
Esmeralda	(Spain) Cuba	The schooner was driven ashore in the Bay of Matanzas.
Espoz y Mina	(Spain) Cuba	The schooner was driven ashore and wrecked in the Bay of Matanzas.
Exertion	(United Kingdom of Great Britain and Ireland) Jamaica	The schooner was wrecked at Jamaica.
Fortuna	United Kingdom	The ship was wrecked at Havana. She was on a voyage from Sydney, New South Wales to Halifax, Nova Scotia, British North America.
Glastina	(United Kingdom of Great Britain and Ireland) Jamaica	The sloop was wrecked at Jamaica.
Hanover	(United Kingdom of Great Britain and Ireland) Jamaica	The ship was wrecked in a hurricane at Jamaica.
Harmonie	Sweden	The ship collided with Pennsylvania (United States) and sank in the Atlantic Ocean. Her crew were rescued by Huron (France).
Hunter	(United Kingdom of Great Britain and Ireland) Jamaica	The sloop was wrecked at Jamaica.
Independent	United Kingdom	The barque ran aground on the Insand, in the North Sea off the coast of County Durham. She was on a voyage from Quebec City, Province of Canada, British North America to South Shields, County Durham. She was refloated on 7 October.
Indian Chief	United Kingdom	The ship was driven ashore on Cape Rosier, Maine, United States. She was on a voyage from Liverpool, Lancashire to Quebec City.
Industria	(Spain) Cuba	The ship was wrecked off Cárdenas. She was on a voyage from Havana to Sagua La Grande.
Isabella	(United Kingdom of Great Britain and Ireland) Jamaica	The sloop was wrecked at Montego Bay, Jamaica. The sole person on board was rescued.
Jack Tar	(United Kingdom of Great Britain and Ireland) Jamaica	The ship was wrecked in a hurricane at Jamaica.
Jackdaw	(United Kingdom of Great Britain and Ireland) Jamaica	The ship was wrecked in a hurricane at Jamaica.
Juanita	(Spain) Cuba	The schooner sank in the Bay of Matanzas.
Lastenia	(Spain) Cuba	The ship was wrecked, driven ashore or sank at Cárdenas.
Lawrence	United Kingdom	The ship was wrecked at Havana.
Louisa	United States	The ship was driven ashore at Matanzas.
Magna Charta	(United Kingdom of Great Britain and Ireland) Jamaica	The sloop was wrecked at Jamaica.
Manuela	(Spain) Cuba	The schooner was driven ashore at Havana.
Maria	(Spain) Cuba	The schooner was damaged in the Bay of Matanzas.
Mary	United Kingdom	The ship ran aground on the Knock Sand, in the North Sea off the coast of Kent. She was on a voyage from Bombay, India to London. She was refloated and resumed her voyage.
Mary	(United Kingdom of Great Britain and Ireland) Jamaica	The schooner was wrecked at Jamaica.
Mellish	United Kingdom	The ship was wrecked in the Paracel Islands with some loss of life. She was on a voyage from China to London. There were ultimately eleven survivors.
Mercedita	(Spain) Cuba	The ship was wrecked on the Punta Gorda Reef, off the coast of Cuba.
Ocenten	Sweden	The ship ran aground off Bornholm, Denmark and was damaged. She was on a voyage from Gävle to New York, United States. She was refloated and put in to Christiansø, Denmark for repairs.
Ogawarr	United States	The ship was driven ashore and wrecked at Havana.
Ontario	United States	The barque was driven ashore in the Bay of Matanzas.
Palestine	United States	The schooner was driven ashore and damaged in the Bay of Matanzas.
Paragon	United Kingdom	The ship was wrecked at Havana.
Prince George	United Kingdom	The ship was wrecked at Havana.
Pronta	(Spain) Cuba	The schooner was driven ashore and wrecked in the Bay of Matanzas.
Rachael	(United Kingdom of Great Britain and Ireland) Jamaica	The sloop was wrecked at Jamaica.
Rayo	(Spain) Cuba	The schooner was driven ashore and severely damaged in the Bay of Matanzas.
Reglita	(Spain) Cuba	The schooner was driven ashore and wrecked in the Bay of Matanzas.
Robert Mills	United States	The schooner was driven ashore in the Bay of Matanzas.
Rose	(United Kingdom of Great Britain and Ireland) Jamaica	The ship was wrecked in a hurricane at Jamaica.
San Antonio	(Spain) Cuba	The schooner sank in the Bay of Matanzas.
Siszia	(United Kingdom of Great Britain and Ireland) Jamaica	The sloop was wrecked at Jamaica.
St. Lawrence	(United Kingdom of Great Britain and Ireland) British North America	The ship was dismasted in a hurricane whilst on a voyage from Halifax, Nova Scotia to Havana. She put into Nassau, Bahamas, where she was condemned.
Tom Paine	(United Kingdom of Great Britain and Ireland)	The ship was wrecked in a hurricane at Jamaica.
Tom Smith	(United Kingdom of Great Britain and Ireland) Jamaica	The sloop was wrecked at Jamaica.
Victoria	(Spain) Cuba	The schooner was damaged in the Bay of Matanzas.
Washington	United States	The brig was driven ashore in the Bay of Matanzas.
Wave	(United Kingdom of Great Britain and Ireland) Jamaica	The sloop was severely wrecked at Jamaica.

== 6 October ==
List of shipwrecks: 6 October 1844
Ship	State	Description
Alpha	United Kingdom	The ship was wrecked off "Levenskar". Her crew were rescued.
Clara and Emma	United Kingdom	The ship was dismasted and abandoned in the Atlantic Ocean. Her crew were rescued. She was on a voyage from La Guaira, Venezuela to Cork.
Dash	United Kingdom	The ship was wrecked on Bimini. She was on a voyage from Jamaica to Africa.
Elizabeth	United States	The ship foundered in the Atlantic Ocean with some loss of life. Three people landed at Sisal, Mexico in a boat. Five people were rescued by a French brig. Twenty three people took to a launch, but were reported as missing. Elizabeth was on a voyage from Liverpool, Lancashire, United Kingdom to New Orleans, Louisiana.
Fortuna	Kingdom of the Two Sicilies	The ship was driven ashore on the west coast of Seskar, Russia. She was on a voyage from Messina to Saint Petersburg, Russia.
Hansa	Bremen	The ship was wrecked near Cienfuegos, Cuba with the loss of all but two of her crw. She was on a voyage from Bremen to Trinidad.
Lord Vivian	United Kingdom	The cutter ran aground on the West Hoyle Bank, in Liverpool Bay. She was on a voyage from Dublin to Liverpool. Lord Vivian was refloated on 8 October.
Lusteel Lady or Tusket Lady	(United Kingdom of Great Britain and Ireland) British North America	The schooner was driven ashore and wrecked at Yarmouth, Nova Scotia.
Majesty	United Kingdom	The brig was wrecked on the south coast of Cuba. Her crew survived.
Samaritan	United Kingdom	The ship ran aground and was wrecked at Antwerp, Belgium with the loss of a crew member. She was on a voyage from Caen, Calvados, France to Amsterdam, North Holland, Netherlands.

== 7 October ==
List of shipwrecks: 7 October 1844
Ship	State	Description
Ceres	United Kingdom	The ship was driven ashore near Kilnsea, Yorkshire. She was refloated on 15 October.
Erstelling or Forstelling	Flag unknown	The ship was in collision with Norstern ( Danzig) and foundered off Hela, Prussia.
Haabets Anker	Norway	The ship was driven ashore and wrecked at Riga, Russia.
Hoffnung	Flag unknown	The ship was wrecked on "Dagal Island". She was on a voyage from Riga to Saint Petersburg, Russia.
Lady Allen	United Kingdom	The ship ran aground on the Scroby Sands, Norfolk. She was on a voyage from Newcastle upon Tyne, Northumberland to Southampton, Hampshire. Lady Allen was refloated and put in to Great Yarmouth, Norfolk.
Mads	Norway	The ship was driven ashore and wrecked at Riga.
Pearl	(United Kingdom of Great Britain and Ireland) British North America	The ship was driven ashore in "Harbour Bouchet". She was on a voyage from Miramichi, New Brunswick to Halifax, Nova Scotia.
Princess Mary	United Kingdom	The ship sank at Riga.
Simplicia	Portugal	The brig was wrecked in Dansburg Bay, Danish India. Her crew were rescued.
Venus	Kingdom of the Two Sicilies	The ship was driven ashore at Riga. Her crew were rescued.
Walter Hamilton	United Kingdom	The ship was wrecked on the Swinebottoms. Her crew were rescued. She was on a voyage from Wick, Caithness to Stettin.
Wisbeach	United Kingdom	The ship was driven ashore at Riga. Her crew were rescued. She had been refloated by 10 October.

== 8 October ==
List of shipwrecks: 8 October 1844
Ship	State	Description
Albion	United Kingdom	The ship was driven ashore at Ramsey, Isle of Man. She was on a voyage from Liverpool, Lancashire to Ramsey. She was refloated on 16 October and taken in to Ramsey for repairs.
Amelia	United Kingdom	The ship was driven ashore on Anglesey. She was on a voyage from Killyleagh, County Down to Liverpool.
Anna	United Kingdom	The ship was driven ashore and wrecked at Strangford, County Down. Her crew were rescued. She was on a voyage from Liverpool to Kronstadt, Russia.
Anna	Rostock	The ship was driven ashore at Warnemünde. She was on a voyage from Rostock to Bremen. She was later refloated.
Benjamin Hart	(United Kingdom of Great Britain and Ireland)	The brigantine was driven ashore and wrecked at "Heiradara" or "Herradura", Chile. Her crew were rescued.
Columbus	United Kingdom	The ship ran aground on the Manicougan Shoals and was severely damaged. She was on a voyage from Quebec City, Province of Canada, British North America to Bristol, Gloucestershire. She was refloated on 11 October.
Forsoget	Norway	The ship foundered in the North Sea 60 nautical miles (110 km) north west of Heligoland. Her crew were rescued. She was on a voyage from Caen, Calvados, France to Christiansand.
Lady Bulkeley	United Kingdom	The ship was driven ashore at Penmon, Anglesey. She was on a voyage from Liverpool to Beaumaris, Anglesey.
Little Will	United Kingdom	The flat was driven ashore at Penmon. She was on a voyage from Caernarfon to Liverpool.
Patricia	United Kingdom	The ship was driven ashore at Ramsey. She was on a voyage from Liverpool to Portrush, County Antrim. She was refloated on 16 October and taken in to Ramsey for repairs.
Sophia and Eliza	United States	The whaler, a barque, collided with the East Indiaman barque Wellington (United Kingdom and was abandoned in the Atlantic Ocean (18°S 27°W). Her crew were rescued by Wellington and she was set afire.
Susannah	United Kingdom	The ship was driven ashore on the coast of County Wicklow.

== 9 October ==
List of shipwrecks: 9 October 1844
Ship	State	Description
Active	United Kingdom	The ship was driven ashore and wrecked on the Cruz de Ferro Rocks, off Porto, Portugal. She was on a voyage from the Azores to Porto.
Alert	United Kingdom	The ship was driven ashore at the Mumbles, Glamorgan.
Alexander Forbes	United Kingdom	The ship was driven ashore and wrecked at Lamlash, Isle of Arran. She was on a voyage from the Clyde to Sligo. She had been refloated by 16 October.
Alliance	United Kingdom	The ship was driven ashore and wrecked at Par, Cornwall. Her crew were rescued. She was on a voyage from Plymouth, Devon to Falmouth, Cornwall.
Alliancen	Sweden	The ship was driven ashore near Kalmar. Her crew were rescued.
Allihies	United Kingdom	The ship was driven ashore in Studland Bay. She was on a voyage from London to Weymouth, Dorset.
Amity	United Kingdom	The brig was driven ashore and wrecked at Skerries, County Dublin. Her crew were rescued. She was on a voyage from Ayr to Dublin.
Ann	United Kingdom	The ship was driven ashore and wrecked at Lamlash. She had been refloated by 16 October.
Ann and Elizabeth	United Kingdom	The ship was driven ashore at the Mumbles.
Anna	United Kingdom	The ship was driven ashore and wrecked at Ballyquinte Point, County Antrim. Her crew were rescued. She was on a voyage from Liverpool, Lancashire to Helsingør, Denmark. She was refloated on 12 October and taken in to Strangford, County Antrim.
Anna	United Kingdom	The ship was driven ashore and wrecked at Strangford, County Antrim. Her crew were rescued. She was on a voyage from Liverpool to Kronstadt, Russia.
Betsey	United Kingdom	The ship foundered in the Irish Sea. She was on a voyage from Liverpool to Newry, County Antrim.
Britannia	Sweden	The ship was driven ashore near Kalmar with the loss of all but her captain.
Carrywell	United Kingdom	The brig was driven ashore near Macedon Point, County Antrim. She was refloated on 12 October.
Comet	United Kingdom	The ship foundered off Fowey, Cornwall with the loss of all five of her crew.
Daisy	United Kingdom	The ship was driven ashore and wrecked at Carlingford, County Louth with the loss of all hands.
Deptford	United Kingdom	The brig was driven ashore near Borough Island, Devon. Her crew were either rescued or all lost. She was on a voyage from London to Liverpool. She was refloated on 11 October but drove ashore again the next day and was wrecked.
Diana	(United Kingdom of Great Britain and Ireland) Van Diemen's Land	The brig was wrecked at Port Fairy, New South Wales.
Diligence	United Kingdom	The ship was driven ashore at the Mumbles. She was on a voyage from Newport, Monmouthshire to Aberystwyth, Cardiganshire.
Earl of Arran	United Kingdom	The ship was driven ashore and severely damaged at Lamlash. She had been refloated by 16 October.
Elbe	United Kingdom	The ship was driven ashore at Marseille, Bouches-du-Rhône, France. She was on a voyage from Marseille to Malta.
Eliza	United Kingdom	The ship was driven ashore at the Mumbles.
Eliza Neath	United Kingdom	The ship was driven ashore at Lamlash. She was on a voyage from Troon, Ayrshire to Waterford. She had been refloated by 16 October.
Falcon	United Kingdom	The ship was driven ashore and damaged at Dublin.
Frances	United Kingdom	The ship was run into by the barque Jane Boyd and foundered in the Bristol Channel off West Cross, Glamorgan. Her twenty crew survived. She was on a voyage from Valparaíso, Chile to Swansea, Glamorgan. Frances was refloated on 24 December and taken in to Swansea. Also reported as driven ashore between the Mumbles and Swansea.
Friendship	United Kingdom	The ship was driven ashore at the Mumbles.
Good Hope	United Kingdom	The ship was driven ashore and damaged at Dublin.
Grace Darling	United Kingdom	The ship was driven ashore near Dundalk, County Louth. She was on a voyage from Neath, Glamorgan to Dublin. She was refloated on 14 October.
Hectorina	United Kingdom	The ship was driven ashore in Chapelrossan Bay. She was refloated on 12 October.
Hope	United Kingdom	The ship was driven ashore in Chapelrossan Bay. She was on a voyage from Quebec City, Province of Canada, British North America to Maryport, Cumberland.
Industry	United Kingdom	The ship was driven ashore in Chapelrossan Bay and was abandoned.
James and Ann	United Kingdom	The ship was driven ashore at the Mumbles.
Jane	United Kingdom	The ship was driven ashore and damaged at Lamlash. She was on a voyage from the Clyde to Runcorn, Cheshire. She had been refloated by 16 October.
Jane	United Kingdom	The smack was driven ashore 8 nautical miles (15 km) north of Warrenpoint, County Antrim. Her crew were rescued. She was on a voyage from Runcorn, Cheshire to Dublin.
John and Mary	United Kingdom	The ship was driven ashore at Lamlash. She was on a voyage from Ayr to Bangor. She had been refloated by 16 October.
John Lloyd	United Kingdom	The ship was driven ashore at Greenisland, County Antrim.
Josephine	Sweden	The ship ran aground off "Saby". She was on a voyage from Stockholm to Malmö and Halmstadt.
Lady Fullarton	United Kingdom	The ship was driven ashore at Lamlash. She was on a voyage from Troon to Larne, County Antrim. She had been refloated by 16 October and was taken in to Lamlash for repairs.
Lovely	United Kingdom	The ship was driven ashore at Beaumaris, Anglesey. Her crew were rescued. She was on a voyage from Mostyn, Flintshire to "Llandino".
Maid of Mostyn	United Kingdom	The ship was driven ashore on the coast of County Louth. She was on a voyage from Chester, Cheshire to Dublin.
Marchioness of Stafford	United Kingdom	The schooner was driven ashore and wrecked 2 nautical miles (3.7 km) north of Wicklow. Her crew were rescued. She was on a voyage from Pembrey, Pembrokeshire to Killough, County Down.
Margaret and Jane	United Kingdom	The ship was driven ashore and severely damaged at Peterhead, Aberdeenshire. She was refloated.
Mars	United Kingdom	The ship was wrecked off Wicklow. She was on a voyage from Pembrey, Carmarthenshire to Killough, County Down.
Mary	(United Kingdom of Great Britain and Ireland) Sierra Leone	The ship was driven ashore and wrecked at Rush, County Dublin with the loss of three lives. She was on a voyage from Sierra Leone to Liverpool.
Mary	United Kingdom	The ship was in collision with Jane Cook (United Kingdom) and was driven ashore at Campbeltown, Argyllshire.
Mary and Elizabeth	United Kingdom	The ship was driven ashore and wrecked at Tailor's Island, Isles of Scilly. Her crew were rescued. She was on a voyage from London to Gibraltar and Cádiz, Spain.
Minerva	United Kingdom	The ship was driven ashore at the Mumbles. She was on a voyage from Neath to Bideford, Devon. She was refloated on 16 October.
Nymph	United Kingdom	The schooner was in collision with Ocean Queen and foundered in the Irish Sea off Holyhead, Anglesey with the loss of three of her six crew. She was on a voyage from Liverpool to King's Lynn, Norfolk.
Ostsee	Hamburg	The ship was driven ashore and wrecked 6 nautical miles (11 km) south of Porto. Her crew were rescued. She was on a voyage from Lisbon to Porto.
Phantom	United Kingdom	The yacht was wrecked at Rothesay, Bute.
Ranger	United Kingdom	The ship was driven ashore and wrecked at South Shields, County Durham. Her crew were rescued. She was on a voyage from Great Yarmouth, Norfolk to South Shields. She was refloated on 12 October.
Rebecca and Mary	United Kingdom	The ship was driven ashore at the Mumbles. She was on a voyage from Cork to the King Road anchorage, off the coast of Somerset.
Reliance	United Kingdom	The smack was wrecked near Falmouth. Her crew were rescued.
Rose	France	The ship was driven against the quayside at "Frontignac" and was wrecked. She was on a voyage from Africa to Cette, Hérault.
Rosina	United Kingdom	The ship was driven ashore at Lamlash. She was on a voyage from the Clyde to Carlisle, Cumberland. She had been refloated by 16 October.
Sarepta	United Kingdom	The ship was driven ashore at the Mumbles. She was on a voyage from Cuba to Swansea. She was later refloated and taken in to Swansea.
Shannon	United Kingdom	The paddle steamer was driven against the quayside and damaged at Dublin.
Sophie	United Kingdom	The ship was driven ashore and wrecked near St. Michael's Mount, Cornwall. Her crew were rescued.
St Joao Baptiste	Portugal	The ship was wrecked on the Cruz de Ferro Rocks. Her crew were rescued. She was on a voyage from Porto to Vila do Conde.
Susannah	United Kingdom	The schooner was driven ashore at Five Mile Point, County Wicklow. Her crew were rescued. She was on a voyage from Chester to Aberystwyth. She was later refloated and resumed her voyage, arriving at Aberystwyth of 23 October.
Thistle	United Kingdom	The schooner was driven against the quayside and sank at Dublin. Her crew were rescued.
Triad	United Kingdom	The ship was driven ashore and wrecked at Leven, Fife. She floated off on 14 October and was towed into Burntisland, Fife.
Two Sisters	United Kingdom	The ship, a fishing smack or collier, was wrecked on the Gunfleet Sand, in the North Sea off the coast of Essex. Her crew were rescued.
Victor	United Kingdom	The steamship was driven ashore and damaged at Lamlash. She was refloated and put under repair.
Volunteer	United Kingdom	The ship was driven ashore and damaged at Dublin.

== 10 October ==
List of shipwrecks: 10 October 1844
Ship	State	Description
Barbara	United Kingdom	The schooner was driven ashore and severely damaged at Johnshaven, Aberdeenshire. She was refloated and taken into Montrose, Forfarshire for repairs.
Carl Christian	Prussia	The barque was driven ashore and wrecked at "Newark Island" off Sanday, Orkney Islands, United Kingdom. Her crew were rescued. She was on a voyage from Danzig to Liverpool, Lancashire, United Kingdom.
Elizabeth	United States	The brig foundered off Cape St. Antonio, Cuba. Some of her crew and her passengers were rescued by the brig Mappemonde (France). The rest of her crew in a longboat were presumed to have perished.
Henry and Jane	United Kingdom	The ship was driven ashore 3 nautical miles (5.6 km) east of Fowey, Cornwall with the loss of all hands.
L'Esperance	France	The ship sprang a leak and was abandoned in the English Channel off Portland, Dorset, United Kingdom. Her crew were rescued by Thorvald (Russia). She was on a voyage from the Île de Ré, Finistère to Caen, Calvados.
Minerve	French Navy	The Téméraire-class ship of the line ran aground off Rhodes, Greece. She was refloated with the aid of Alcibiade (French Navy) and six Ottoman Navy vessels.
St. Louis	France	The ship was driven ashore at Portsea, Hampshire, United Kingdom. She was on a voyage from Cherbourg, Seine-Inférieure to Penzance, Cornwall.
Susan	United Kingdom	The ship was driven ashore in the Sound of Sunda. She was on a voyage from Troon, Ayrshire to Galway. She was refloated on 22 October and taken in to Campbeltown, Argyllshire.
Venus	United Kingdom	The ship was driven ashore in Sinclair's Bay with the loss of four of her crew. She was on a voyage from Dunbar, Lothian to an Irish port.
William	United Kingdom	The ship was driven ashore on Gunn's Island. Her crew were rescued. She was on a voyage from Cardiff, Glamorgan to Belfast, County Antrim.

== 11 October ==
List of shipwrecks: 11 October 1844
Ship	State	Description
Cygnet	United Kingdom	The ship sprang a leak and foundered in the North Sea off Flamborough Head, Yorkshire. Her crew were rescued by Ann and Emma (United Kingdom).
Jaramas	Sweden	The ship ran aground on the Bredgrund.
Johanna Maria	Sweden	The ship ran aground on the Bredgrund.
Normandy	United Kingdom	The brig was in collision with a brig and foundered in the North Sea off the coast of Yorkshire. Her crew survived.
William Jenkinson or William Parkinson	United Kingdom	The brig was wrecked on Saaremaa, Russia. She was on a voyage from Hull, Yorkshire to Saint Petersburg, Russia.

== 12 October ==
List of shipwrecks: 12 October 1844
Ship	State	Description
Catharine	United Kingdom	The ship was driven ashore and wrecked at Clacton-on-Sea, Essex.
Constant	Belgium	The ship was wrecked at "Montagua". All on board were rescued. She was on a voyage from Antwerp to Saint Thomas, Virgin Islands.
Emma	United Kingdom	The brigantine was in collision with Elizabeth (United Kingdom) in the Atlantic Ocean off Cape Clear Island, County Donegal and was abandoned by all but one of her passengers and crew. One crew member was lost. She was on a voyage from Dar El Beïda, Morocco to Liverpool, Lancashire. Emma was taken into Crookhaven, County Cork on 14 October.
Hazard	United Kingdom	The ship was driven ashore and wrecked at Clacton-on-Sea.
Retrieve	United Kingdom	The ship ran aground on the Scroby Sands, Norfolk. She was refloated and resumed her voyage.
Unon	United Kingdom	The ship was driven ashore between Merro and Annalong, County Down.
Zampha	Denmark	The brig was driven ashore on Killard Point, County Antrim, United Kingdom. Her crew were rescued. She was on a voyage from Liverpool, Lancashire, United Kingdom to Saint Domingo. She was refloated and taken in to Strangford, County Antrim.

== 13 October ==
List of shipwrecks: 13 October 1844
Ship	State	Description
Nooit Gedacht	Netherlands	The ship struck a pile and sank near Rotterdam, South Holland. She was on a voyage from Rotterdam to Sunderland, County Durham, United Kingdom.

== 14 October ==
List of shipwrecks: 14 October 1844
Ship	State	Description
Cerus	United Kingdom	The brig was driven ashore at Kilnsea, Yorkshire. She was refloated.
Magnet	(United Kingdom of Great Britain and Ireland) British North America	The ship ran aground whilst on a voyage from Demerara, British Guiana to Philadelphia, Pennsylvania, United States. Her crew were rescued by Argyle (United Kingdom).
Maria	(United Kingdom of Great Britain and Ireland) British North America	The ship was wrecked near the mouth of the River Godbert. She was on a voyage from "Perle" to Quebec City, Province of Canada.
Mary Wylie	United Kingdom	The ship was driven ashore at Stornoway, Isle of Lewis, Outer Hebrides. She was on a voyage from Saint Petersburg, Russia to Liverpool, Lancashire. She was refloated the next day and resumed her voyage.

== 15 October ==
List of shipwrecks: 15 October 1844
Ship	State	Description
Ange	France	The ship was driven ashore at Bourgneuf, Charente-Maritime.
Augusta	Norway	The ship ran aground on the Jadder Bank, in the North Sea. She was on a voyage from Fraserburgh, Aberdeenshire, United Kingdom to Stettin. She was refloated and put in to Stavanger the next day for repairs.
Babit or Baliel	(United Kingdom of Great Britain and Ireland) British North America	The ship was wrecked near Portneuf, Province of Canada. Five crew were rescued. She was on a voyage from Arichat, Nova Scotia to Quebec City, Provine of Canada.
Catharine	United Kingdom	The ship was driven ashore at Portneuf, Province of Canada, British North America with the loss of twelve of the 21 people on board. She was on a voyage from Quebec City, Province of Canada to Liverpool, Lancashire.
Clarisse	United Kingdom	The ship was driven ashore at Bourgneuf.
Greenwood	United Kingdom	The brig was driven ashore at Clee Ness, Lincolnshire.
Halcyon	United Kingdom	The ship was wrecked at Strangford, County Antrim. She was on a voyage from Maryport, Cumberland to Belfast, County Antrim.
John Cleland	United Kingdom	The schooner was driven ashore and wrecked at Portstewart, County Londonderry. Her crew were rescued. She was on a voyage from Liverpool to Londonderry.
Superb	United Kingdom	The ship departed from Tobermory, Mull, Inner Hebrides for Dublin. No further trace, presumed foundered with the loss of all hands.

== 15 October ==
List of shipwrecks: 15 October 1844
Ship	State	Description
Catherine	United Kingdom	The ship was wrecked at Portneuf, Province of Canada, British North America.

== 16 October ==
List of shipwrecks: 16 October 1844
Ship	State	Description
Brilliant	United Kingdom	The ship was wrecked on the Saugor Sands. Her crew were rescued. She was on a voyage from Bombay to Calcutta, India.
Jesmond	United Kingdom	The ship was wrecked at Quarff, Shetland Islands with the loss of a crew member. She was on a voyage from Arkhangelsk, Russia to Hull, Yorkshire.
Njord	Netherlands	The ship was wrecked near Malla, Russia. She was on a voyage from Narva, Russia to Amsterdam, North Holland.
Vriendschap	Netherlands	The ship was lost off Capbreton, Landes, France. She was on a voyage from Amsterdam, North Holland to Bilbao, Spain and Bayonne, Basses-Pyrénées, France.

== 17 October ==
List of shipwrecks: 17 October 1844
Ship	State	Description
British Hero	United Kingdom	The ship was driven ashore and wrecked on the east coast of Gotland, Sweden. Her crew survived. She was on a voyage from Saint Petersburg, Russia to Dundee, Forfarshire.
Courrier de Senegal	France	The ship was wrecked near "Cape Naze", Zeeland, Netherlands. Her crew were rescued.
Endeavour	United Kingdom	The ship struck the quayside and sank at Holyhead, Anglesey. She was on a voyage from "Dronwick" to Irvine, Ayrshire.
Gipsy	United Kingdom	The ship struck a sandbank and sank in the English Channel off the coast of France. Her crew were rescued. She was on a voyage from Newcastle upon Tyne, Northumberland to Rouen, Seine-Inférieure, France. She was later refloated.
Jane	United Kingdom	The ship was driven ashore at Memel, Prussia. Her crew were rescued.
Jean and Mary	United Kingdom	The ship sprang a leak and was abandoned in the North Sea off Winterton-on-Sea, Norfolk. Her crew were rescued.
Le Jeune Edouard	France	The chasse-marée was wrecked on the Longsand, in the North Sea off the coast of Essex, United Kingdom. Her crew survived. She was on a voyage from Hartlepool, County Durham, United Kingdom to Bordeaux, Gironde.
Lucille	United Kingdom	The ship was driven ashore at Widewall, Orkney Islands. She was on a voyage from Saint Petersburg to Dublin. She was refloated the next day.
Mary	United Kingdom	The collier, a brig, was in collision with another vessel and foundered off Harwich Essex. Her crew were rescued.
Mary and Frances	United Kingdom	The ship was driven ashore and severely damaged at Peel, Isle of Man.
Novel Gedacht	Netherlands	The ship struck a pile and sank at Vlissingen, Zeeland.
Phoenix	United Kingdom	The steamship was driven ashore and damaged at Breaksea Point, Glamorgan. She was on a voyage from Youghal, County Cork to Newport, Monmouthshire. She was refloated on 24 October.
Scotia	United Kingdom	The ship was wrecked at Esposende, Portugal. Her crew were rescued. She was on a voyage from St. John's, Newfoundland, British North America to Porto, Portugal.

== 18 October ==
List of shipwrecks: 18 October 1844
Ship	State	Description
Ashland	United States	The schooner was driven ashore at Buffalo, New York. She was later refloated.
Bunker Hill	United States	The steamship was driven ashore at Buffalo.
Chautauque	United States	The steamship was driven ashore near Black Rock, New York.
Cleveland	United States	The ship foundered with the loss of over 200 lives.
Columbus	United States	The steamship was driven ashore at Buffalo.
Commodore Perry	United States	The ship was driven ashore at Buffalo, colliding with Great Western and running in to Wayne (both United States).
Emerald	(United Kingdom of Great Britain and Ireland) British North America	The steamship was driven ashore at Buffalo.
Experiment	United Kingdom	The ship was driven ashore at "Mowbray", on the Solway Firth.
Flamingo	(United Kingdom of Great Britain and Ireland) Cape Colony	The cutter was driven ashore and wrecked in Strings Bay.
Fulton	United States	The steamship was driven ashore and wrecked at Sturgeon Point, New York with the loss of three lives.
G. W. Hill	United States	The steamship was driven ashore at Buffalo.
Illinois	United States	The steamship was wrecked at Buffalo with the loss of more than 300 lives.
J. F. Porter	United States	The schooner capsized at Buffalo.
John Marshall	United States	The steamship was wrecked at Stony Point, New York. All on board survived.
Lady of the Lake	United States	The ship ran aground at Ogdensburg, New York.
Mercy	United Kingdom	The ship struck the West Rocks, in the North Sea off the coast of Essex and sank. Her crew were rescued.
Pennsylvania	United States	The schooner was lost in Lake Erie.
Primrose	(United Kingdom of Great Britain and Ireland) British North America	The schooner was presumed to have foundered off Wellington, Nova Scotia.
Robert Fulton	United States	The steamship was wrecked at Sturgeon Point, in Lake Erie. Three passengers had been washed overboard before she came ashore.

== 19 October ==
List of shipwrecks: 19 October 1844
Ship	State	Description
Agne or Ange	France	The ship was driven ashore at Boulogne, Pas-de-Calais. She was on a voyage from Blyth, Northumberland, United Kingdom to Le Pouliguen, Loire-Inférieure.
Ann	United Kingdom	The ship ran aground and was scuttled at Shoreham-by-Sea, Sussex. She was refloated on 21 October and taken in to Shoreham-by-Sea.
Belgrave	United Kingdom	The ship sprang a leak and foundered in the Irish Sea off the coast of Lancashire.
Diana	(United Kingdom of Great Britain and Ireland) Van Diemen's Land	The brig was driven ashore and wrecked at Port Fairy, New South Wales.
Elizabeth	United Kingdom	The ship was holed by ice and sank at Taganrog, Russia.
Gustav	Stettin	The ship was wrecked near Rixhöft, Prussia. Her crew were rescued. She was on a voyage from Griefswald to King's Lynn, Norfolk, United Kingdom.
Jim Crow	(United Kingdom of Great Britain and Ireland) British North America	The ship was wrecked at New Harbour, Nova Scotia. She was on a voyage from Sydney, Nova Scotia to New York, United States.
Mary	United Kingdom	The ship was destroyed by fire at New Orleans, Louisiana, United States.
Queen of the Isles	United Kingdom	The ship ran aground on the Knock Sand, off the coast of Kent. She was on a voyage from Waterford to London. She was refloated and resumed her voyage.

== 20 October ==
List of shipwrecks: 20 October 1844
Ship	State	Description
Actaeon	United Kingdom	The paddle steamer was wrecked on the Negrel Rock. Her crew were rescued. She was on a voyage from Santa Marta, Republic of New Granada to Cartagena, Republic of New Granada.
Alert	United Kingdom	The ship sprang a leak and foundered in the North Sea off the coast of Essex. Her crew were rescued. She was on a voyage from Wivenhoe, Essex to London.
Ann	United Kingdom	The ship ran aground and was scuttled at Shoreham-by-Sea, Sussex. She was refloated the next day and taken in to Shoreham-by-Sea.
Carl	Sweden	The galeas was driven ashore on Öland. She was refloated and put in to Stockholm.
Maria	Danzig	The ship was driven ashore south of "Helsingtewig". Sweden. She was on a voyage from London, United Kingdom to Danzig. She was refloated and resumed her voyage.
Mayflower	United Kingdom	The ship ran aground whilst leaving Little Bras d'Or, Nova Scotia, British North America. She was refloated and taken in to that port, but consequently sank.
Najaden	Sweden	The ship ran aground at Visby and was damaged. She was on a voyage from Stockholm to "Ahuna". She was refloated and taken in to Visby for repairs.
Patronen	Sweden	The ship was wrecked at "Fjand", Denmark. She was on a voyage from St. Ubes, Portugal to Visby.

== 21 October ==
List of shipwrecks: 21 October 1844
Ship	State	Description
Juno	United Kingdom	The ship was driven ashore at Maryport, Cumberland. She was refloated the next day.
Trina	Norway	The ship was driven ashore at Thunö.
Walter	United Kingdom	The ship was driven ashore at the Cape Henelopen Lighthouse, Delaware, United States. She was on a voyage from Liverpool, Lancashire to Philadelphia, Pennsylvania, United States.
Wethleti	United Kingdom	The ship ran aground off Læsø, Denmark. She was on a voyage from Stettin to Dundee, Forfarshire. She was refloated and resumed her voyage.

== 22 October ==
List of shipwrecks: 22 October 1844
Ship	State	Description
Carl Gustaff	Sweden	The ship was wrecked on the Goodwin Sands, Kent, United Kingdom. Her crew were rescued. She was on a voyage from Stockholm to St. Ubes, Portugal or vice versa.
Clio	United Kingdom	The ship was driven ashore at Skegness, Lincolnshire. Her crew were rescued. Clio was later refloated; she arrived at Scarborough, Yorkshire on 25 October.
Endeavour	United Kingdom	The sloop ran aground on the Mouse Sand, in the North Sea. She was on a voyage from Wisbech, Cambridgeshire to Sandwich, Kent. She was refloated and put in to Margate, Kent in a leaky condition.
George	United Kingdom	The ship was driven ashore and wrecked at Hogsthorpe, Lincolnshire. Her crew were rescued. She was on a voyage from Great Yarmouth, Norfolk to Leeds, Yorkshire.
Isabella	United Kingdom	The sloop was driven ashore south of Bridlington, Yorkshire and was scuttled. Her crew were rescued, She was on a voyage from Bridlington to Hartlepool, County Durham. Isabella was refloated the next day and taken in to Bridlington.

== 23 October ==
List of shipwrecks: 23 October 1844
Ship	State	Description
Anna Margaretha	Wismar	The schooner struck the Steturock, off Heligoland, and foundered. She was on a voyage from Wismar to Aberdeen, United Kingdom.
Lucy Walker	United States	Lucy Walker. Lucy Walker steamboat disaster: The steamship suffered a boiler explosion, caught fire and sank in the Ohio River at New Albany, Indiana. At least 56 people were killed, with some estimates of over 100 killed.
Mathilde	(Russian Empire) Grand Duchy of Finland	The ship was driven ashore and wrecked at Felixtowe, Suffolk, United Kingdom. She was on a voyage from Uusikaupunki to Harwich, Essex, United Kingdom.
Victoria	United Kingdom	The ship capsized at Falmouth, Cornwall.

== 24 October ==
List of shipwrecks: 24 October 1844
Ship	State	Description
Albert	United Kingdom	The ship was wrecked off "Bulberg", Denmark. She was on a voyage from Memel, Prussia to London.
Victor	France	The ship was driven ashore west of the mouth of the Llobregat. Her crew were rescued. She was on a voyage from Newfoundland, British North America to Marseille, Bouches-du-Rhône.

== 25 October ==
List of shipwrecks: 25 October 1844
Ship	State	Description
Atlantic	United States	The ship was wrecked on the Carysfort Reef. All on board were rescued. She was on a voyage from Liverpool, Lancashire, United Kingdom to New Orleans, Louisiana.
Dourado	Portugal	The ship was driven ashore near Harlingen, Friesland, Netherlands. She was on a voyage from Lisbon to Amsterdam, North Holland, Netherlands.
Georgiana	United Kingdom	The ship ran aground in the River Tees and was wrecked. Her crew were rescued. She was on a voyage from the River Tees to Dieppe, Seine-Inférieure, France.
Hudson	United States	The schooner was lost off Key West, Florida Territory with the loss of all hands.
USRC Vigilant	United States Revenue-Marine	The revenue cutter was lost off Key West with the loss of all hands.

== 26 October ==
List of shipwrecks: 26 October 1844
Ship	State	Description
Ann	United Kingdom	The ship ran aground on the Herd Sand, in the North Sea off the coast of County Durham. She was on a voyage from London to South Shields, County Durham. She was refloated and taken in to South Shields.
Carbon	United Kingdom	The ship was driven ashore at Wellington, New Zealand. She was refloated.
Charles	United Kingdom	The ship capsized at Port Talbot, Glamorgan. She was righted the next day.
Eleanor	United Kingdom	The brig was driven ashore at Wellington. She was refloated.
Experience	United Kingdom	The ship was abandoned in the English Channel off Havre de Grâce, Seine-Inférieure, France. She was on a voyage from Newcastle upon Tyne, Northumberland to Havre de Grâce.
Friedrich Wilhelm	Hamburg	The ship was driven ashore near "Eitzenloch". She was on a voyage from Bremen to Hamburg. She was refloated and put in to Cuxhaven in a leaky condition.
Ocean	United Kingdom	The ship was driven ashore at Wellington. She was refloated.
Tyne	United Kingdom	The ship sprang a leak and foundered in the North Sea off Whitby, Yorkshire. Her crew survived. She was on a voyage from South Shields, County Durham to Lowestoft, Suffolk.

== 27 October ==
List of shipwrecks: 27 October 1844
Ship	State	Description
Catharine	United Kingdom	The schooner was destroyed by fire in Avoch Bay.
Friedrich Franz	Grand Duchy of Mecklenburg-Schwerin	The barque was holed by ice and abandoned at Taganrog, Russia. She was subsequently carried out to sea. Discovered in July 1845, she was taken in to Kertch, Russia.
Johanna Hendrika	Netherlands	The ship was driven ashore at Egmond aan Zee, North Holland. Her crew were rescued. She was on a voyage from Sunderland, County Durham, United Kingdom to Amsterdam, North Holland.
Riga	Russia	The steamship was destroyed by fire at Riga. She was on a voyage from Saint Petersburg to Riga.
Veracity	United Kingdom	The ship was driven ashore in the Dardanelles. She was on a voyage from Taganrog to Cork or Falmouth, Cornwall. She was refloated on 1 November.

== 28 October ==
List of shipwrecks: 28 October 1844
Ship	State	Description
Aghia	Greece	The ship was lost between "St George's" and Sulina, Ottoman Empire.
Agnes Ann	United Kingdom	The ship was driven ashore and damaged at Maitland's Cove.
Athelstane	United Kingdom	The ship was driven ashore at Sillery Cove, Province of Canada, British North America.
Dove	(United Kingdom of Great Britain and Ireland) British North America	The schooner was driven ashore and wrecked at "St. Rock's", She was on a voyage from New Carlisle to Quebec City, Province of Canada.
Exile	United Kingdom	The schooner was driven ashore at Scituate, Massachusetts, United States. All on board were rescued. She was on a voyage from Cornwallis, Nova Scotia, British North America to Boston, Massachusetts, United States.
Frau Ambtmannin Kempe	Netherlands	The ship was driven ashore and wrecked on Syros, Greece. She was on a voyage from Amsterdam, North Holland to Syros.
Henrietta	(United Kingdom of Great Britain and Ireland) British North America	The schooner was driven ashore and wrecked at "St. Rock's". She was on a voyage from Les Éboulements, Province of Canada to Quebec City.
Kate	United Kingdom	The brig was wrecked 30 nautical miles (56 km) north of Ichaboe Island, Portuguese West Africa with the loss of all but three of her crew.
Sir Henry Hardinge	United Kingdom	The ship was driven ashore and wrecked near Fårö, Sweden. She was on a voyage from Saint Petersburg, Russia to London.
Treasurer	United Kingdom	The ship struck the pier at Sharpness, Gloucestershire and was holed by her anchor. She was consequently beached. She was on a voyage from Galați, Ottoman Empire to Sharpness.

== 29 October ==
List of shipwrecks: 29 October 1844
Ship	State	Description
Catharine	Hamburg	The brig foundered in the English Channel off St. Catherine's Down, Isle of Wight, United Kingdom. Her crew survived.
John and Mary	United Kingdom	The barque was abandoned in the Atlantic Ocean. Her crew were rescued. She was on a voyage from Quebec City, Province of Canada, British North America to Liverpool, Lancashire.
L'Eté	France	The brig ran aground on the Goodwin Sands, Kent, United Kingdom. She was on a voyage from Saint-Malo, Ille-et-Vilaine to Sunderland, County Durham, United Kingdom. She was refloated and put in to Ramsgate, Kent in a leaky condition.
Jasper	United Kingdom	The ship ran aground on the Long Sand, in the North Sea off the coast of Essex. She was on a voyage from Liverpool to London. She was refloated and put in to Margate, Kent.
Java	United Kingdom	The ship ran aground on the Herd Sand, in the North Sea off the coast of County Durham. Her crew were rescued by the North Shields Lifeboat. She was on a voyage from South Shields, County Durham to Portaferry, County Antrim. She was refloated and towed in to North Shields.
Quebec	(United Kingdom of Great Britain and Ireland) British North America	The ship was driven ashore in the Saint Lawrence River and was abandoned by her crew. She was on a voyage from Quebec City to Liverpool, Lancashire.
Robert	Stettin	The ship was lost near Ichaboe Island, Portuguese West Africa with the loss of all but one of her crew. She was on a voyage from Buenos Aires, Argentina to Ichaboe Island.

== 30 October ==
List of shipwrecks: 30 October 1844
Ship	State	Description
Carlton	United Kingdom	The ship was wrecked on the Manicougan Shoals with the loss of three of her crew. She was on a voyage from Quebec City, Province of Canada, British North America to Liverpool, Lancashire.
Defiance	(United Kingdom of Great Britain and Ireland) Isle of Man	The sloop was driven ashore at Ramsey.
Eva Catharina	Hamburg	The ship was driven ashore derelict at Niton, Isle of Wight, United Kingdom. She was on a voyage from Bristol, Gloucestershire, United Kingdom to Hamburg.

== 31 October ==
List of shipwrecks: 31 October 1844
Ship	State	Description
Alexandre	France	The ship ran aground on the Kentish Knock. She was on a voyage from Saint Petersburg, Russia to Bayonne, Basses-Pyrénées. She was refloated and taken in to Harwich, Essex, United Kingdom in a leaky condition.
Flora	United Kingdom	The ship ran aground on the Doom Bar. She was on a voyage from Bude to Padstow, Cornwall. She was refloated and taken in to Padstow.
Victoria	United Kingdom	The ship was driven ashore east of Littlehampton, Sussex. She was on a voyage from Porto, Portugal to London. She was refloated and resumed her voyage.

== Unknown date ==
List of shipwrecks: Unknown date in October 1844
Ship	State	Description
Antigone	France	The ship was driven ashore and wrecked at "Flamand" before 19 October. She was on a voyage from Martinique to Bordeaux, Gironde.
Betty	United Kingdom	The ship was driven ashore at Abersoch, Caernarfonshire. She was refloated on 17 October.
Bon Père	France	The ship foundered in the Atlantic Ocean off the coast of Newfoundland, British North America. Her crew were rescued by Jacob (Hamburg).
Dos Amigos	Spain	The ship was wrecked on the White Key with the loss of all but four of her crew. She was on a voyage from Barcelona to Matanzas, Cuba.
Friends	United Kingdom	The ship was driven ashore at Abersoch. She was refloated on 17 October.
Isabel	Flag unknown	The barque, a prize of HMS Cleopatra (Royal Navy) was wrecked in Algoa Bay before 4 October.
Jane Smith	United Kingdom	The ship was driven ashore at the entrance to the Sea of Azov before 12 October. She was refloated and put in to Constantinople, Ottoman Empire for repairs, arriving on 18 October.
Linea	Sweden	The ship was driven ashore on "Radskar" before 17 October. She was on a voyage from Kronstadt, Russia to Gothenburg. She had become a wreck by 21 November.
Mary Dugdale	United Kingdom	The ship was wrecked off the coast of Cuba before 14 October with the loss of a crew member. She was on a voyage from St. Jago de Cuba to Jamaica and Swansea, Glamorgan.
Matilda	(Russian Empire) Grand Duchy of Finland	The schooner was driven ashore and wrecked at Felixtowe, Suffolk, United Kingdom.
Nils Johan	Sweden	The ship foundered in the Baltic Sea off Bornholm, Denmark.
Orion	Sweden	The schooner was wrecked off Karlskrona before 23 October.
Ossio Felice	Flag unknown	The brig was set afire by HMS Bittern (Royal Navy) i Algoa Bay before 4 October.
Problem	United Kingdom	The yacht capsized and sank in the River Tyne during a squall before 5 October.
Spray	United Kingdom	The brig was abandoned in the Atlantic Ocean. Three crew were rescued by the barque Tacio (Spain), but one of them died on 5 November. Spray was on a voyage from Wilmington, Delaware to Antigua.
Spring	United Kingdom	The ship was lost near "Rousken", in the Gulf of Finland.
Svea	Russia	The ship was driven ashore on "Rolskar" before 17 October.
Telford	United Kingdom	The ship was abandoned in the Irish Sea. She was taken in to Dublin on 18 October.
Venus	United Kingdom	The schooner was wrecked near Wick, Caithness with the loss of all but one of her five crew.
William Chapman	United Kingdom	The ship was abandoned at sea. She was on a voyage from Uleåborg (Oulu), Sweden to Gloucester. She was subsequently taken in to Fredrikshavn, Denmark, where she arrived on 8 October.
Yarmouth	United Kingdom	The sloop was driven ashore at Tynemouth, Northumberland. She was later refloated and taken in to Howdon, Northumberland for repairs.
