= Ardersier =

Village in the Scottish Highlands

Coordinates: 57.56926°N 4.03775°W

Ardersier: Scottish Gaelic: Àird nan Saor
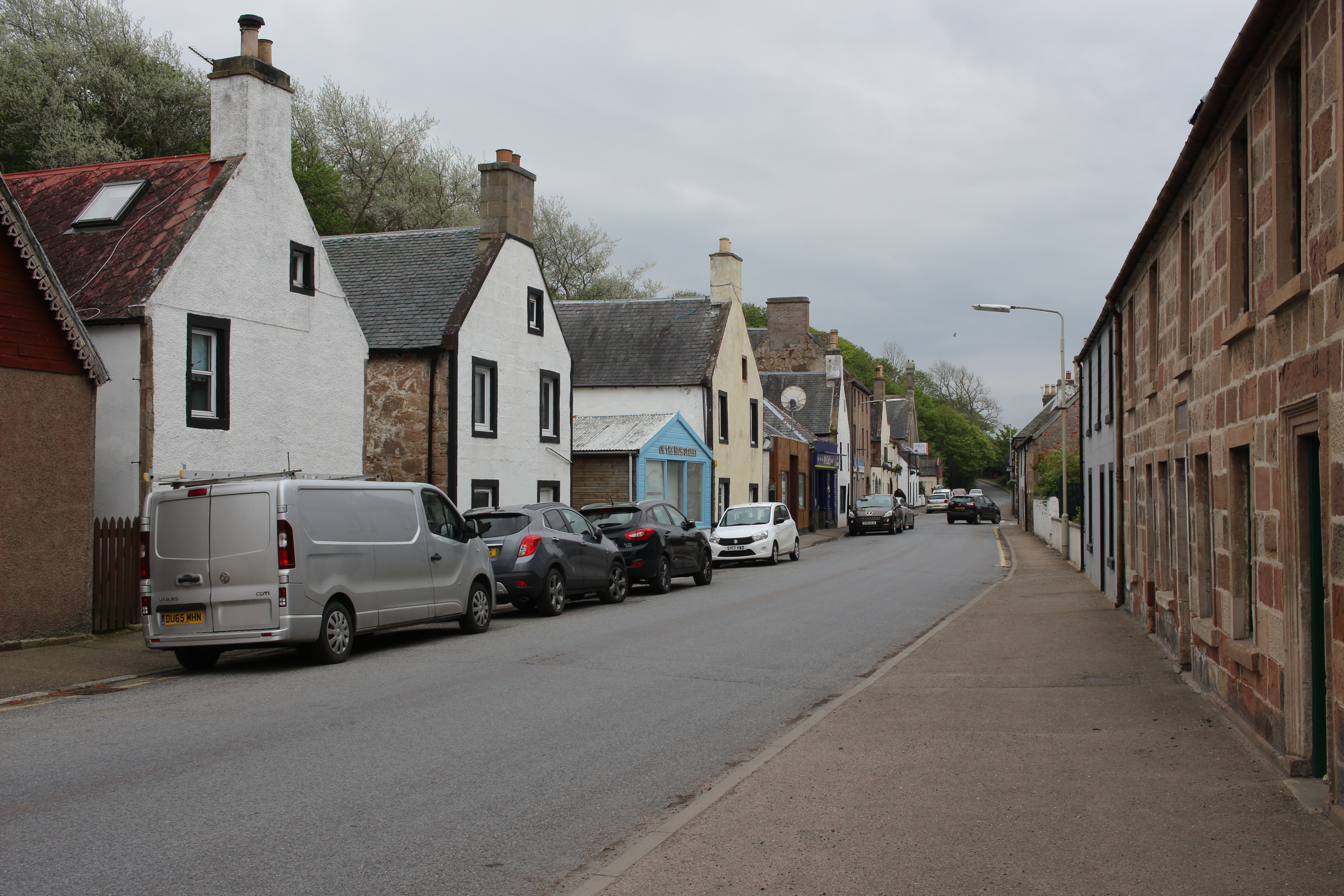

- Location within the Highland council area
- Population: 1,140 (2020)
- OS grid reference: NH782550
- Council area: Highland
- Country: Scotland
- Sovereign state: United Kingdom
- Post town: Inverness
- Postcode district: IV2
- Police: Scotland
- Fire: Scottish
- Ambulance: Scottish
- UK Parliament: Moray West, Nairn and Strathspey
- Scottish Parliament: Inverness and Nairn

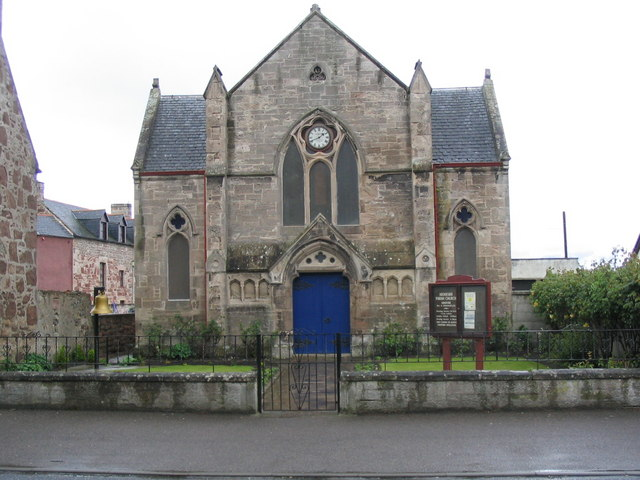
Ardersier Parish Church, built as the United Presbyterian Church in 1880

Ardersier /ˈɑːrdəsir/ (Scottish Gaelic: Àird nan Saor) is a small former fishing village in the Scottish Highlands on the Moray Firth near Fort George, between Inverness and Nairn. Its name may be an anglicisation of the Gaelic "Àird nan Saor", or "Headland of the joiners", one local legend being that carpenters working on the construction of ecclesiastical buildings on the other side of the Moray Firth were quartered here.. however, the name Ardersier is documented centuries before the Cathedrals of Fortrose and Elgin were built, and it is more likely that the name signifies its topography - a high prominence (New Statistical Account).

Prior to the building of Fort George, a small fishing hamlet existed in the area of Fort George, with an economy based on small-scale commercial fishery. Its relocation eventually led to the creation of the village of Ardersier.

== History ==
=== Medieval ===
Parts of the land in and about Ardersier were originally owned by the order of the Knights Templar. These lands were referred to as: Temple Land, Temple Cruik, Temple Bank, Bogschand. They were located between Connage and the sea, and between Flemington and the sea. The Temple lands of Ardersier were held by Davidsons and Mackays as portioners. They were acquired by Cawdor in 1626.

A charter granted at Nairn refers to the locus trialis at Ardersier, and according to the historian George Bain, this may have been an ancient place of trial by wager of battle.

=== Clan feuds ===
Church lands of Ardersier owned by the Bishop of Ross and Delnies had passed into the hands of the Leslies of Ardersier, and they sold them on to Cawdor in the year 1574, "having consideration of the great and intolerable damage, injury, and skaith done to them by Lachlan Mackintosh and others of the Clan Chattan, in harrying, destroying, and making hardships upon the said hail lands of Ardersier and fishings thereof," and no apparent hope of reparation for the "customary enormities of the said Clan Chattan." It is charged against the Mackintoshes that they depauperised the tenants, debarred them from fishing at the stell of Ardersier, breaking their boats and cutting their nets. The Laird of Cawdor was not allowed to have peaceable possession, and he raised an action against Lachlan Mackintosh and his clansmen for the slaughter of several of his servants and tenants. In 1581, Lachlan renounced all claim to the Ardersier lands and to Wester and Easter Delnies, and the legal proceedings were dropped.

=== Jacobite rising ===
After the Jacobite rising of 1745, there was a fear of further French-supported risings, especially of the possibility of a naval assault quickly landing a large number of rebels. The fort provided the facility to house an increased number of soldiers (compared to the original Fort George built in Inverness in 1727) and its position on the coast both guarded the Firth at its narrowest point, and allowed for supplies to be brought in by sea in the event of a land siege.

The requirement for the fort to be built opposite Chanonry Point where the firth narrowed considerably, meant that the population of a small fishing hamlet at the Ness had to resettle about one mile (1.5 kilometres) away on the shores of the Moray Firth. Here were founded two different communities, separated by land ownership. The narrow strip of land along the shore, on which Stewart-town was built belonged to the Earl of Moray and fell within the parish of Petty. Literally across the road, the householders of Campbell-town rented their feus from the Earl of Cawdor, a Campbell. Collectively these two settlements were later referred to by the parish name, as Ardersier, but it was not officially known as such until the late 1970s, thus presenting confusion on postal deliveries to the other Campbeltown in Argyll.

=== Fishing ===
The Annual Reports of the Fishery Board for Scotland provide an insight into the fishing in Arderseir in the years before the First World War. The report for 1900 relates that "the fishermen are principally engaged at the white-fishing. Five large boats were fitted out for the prosecution of the herring fishing on the East and West Coasts of Scotland. Some of the crews were fairly successful." By 1913 we learn that the majority of the fishermen were employed at herring fishing at the principal stations.

Fishery Statistics

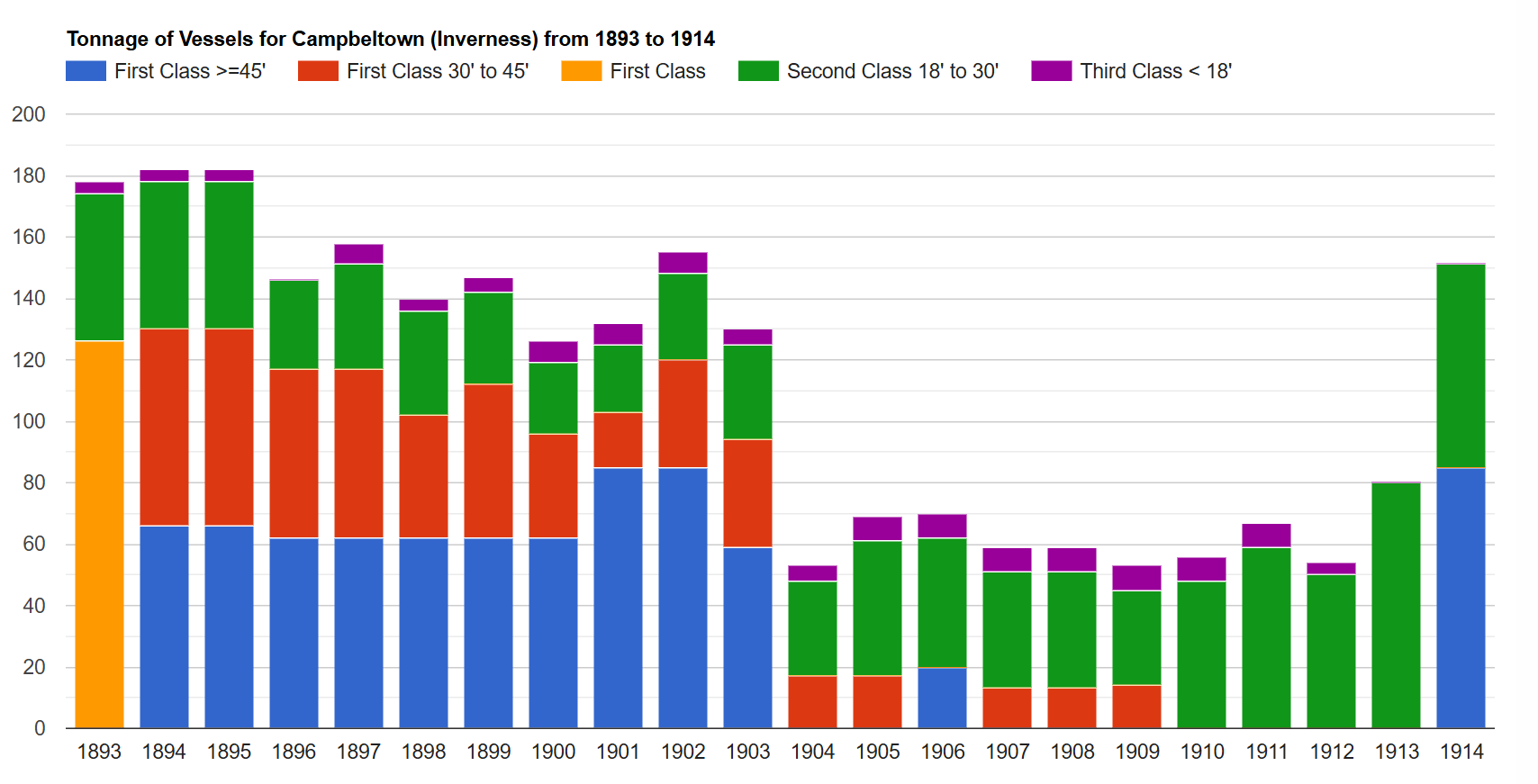
Tonnage of vessels

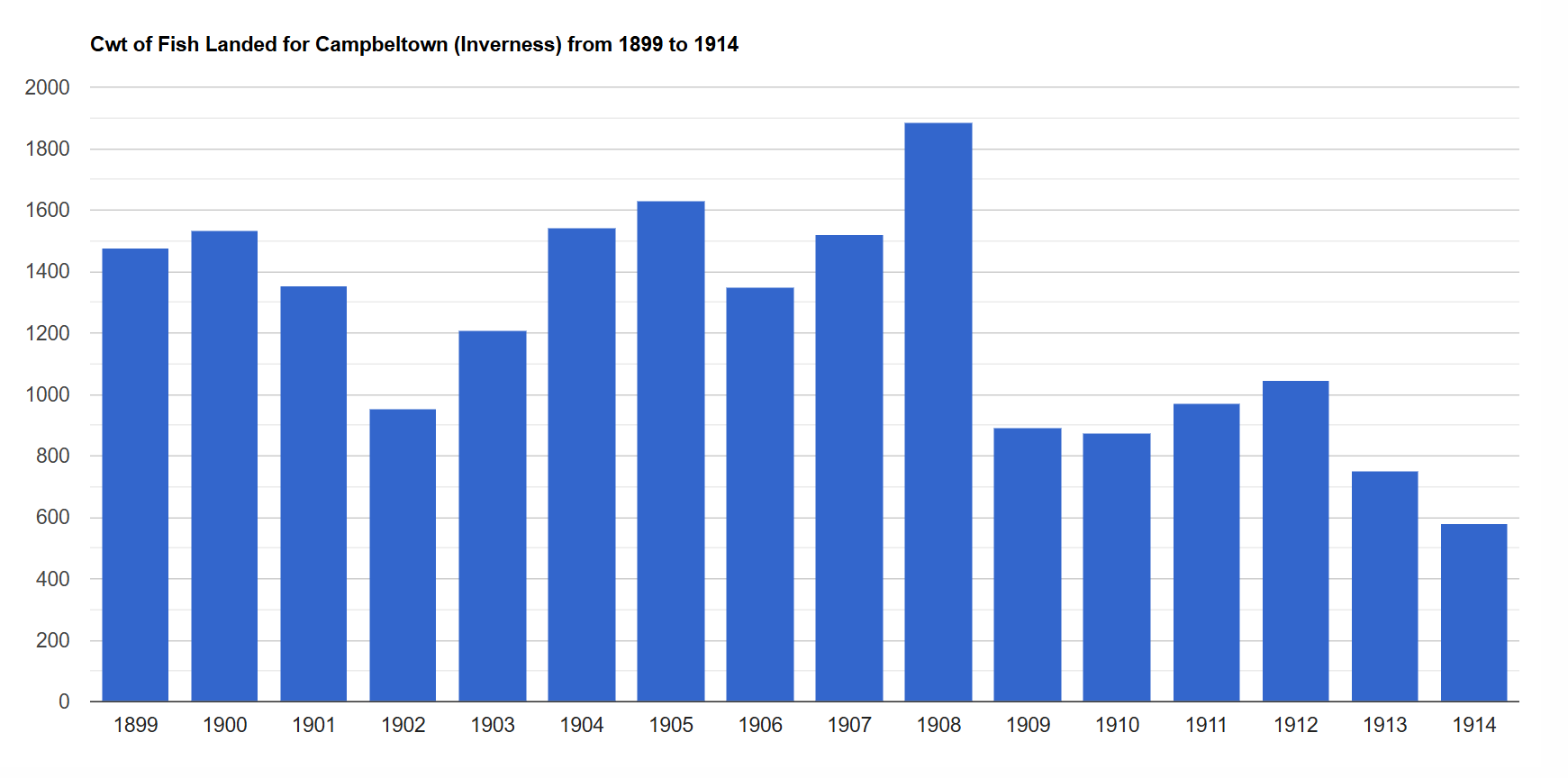
Cwt of fish landed

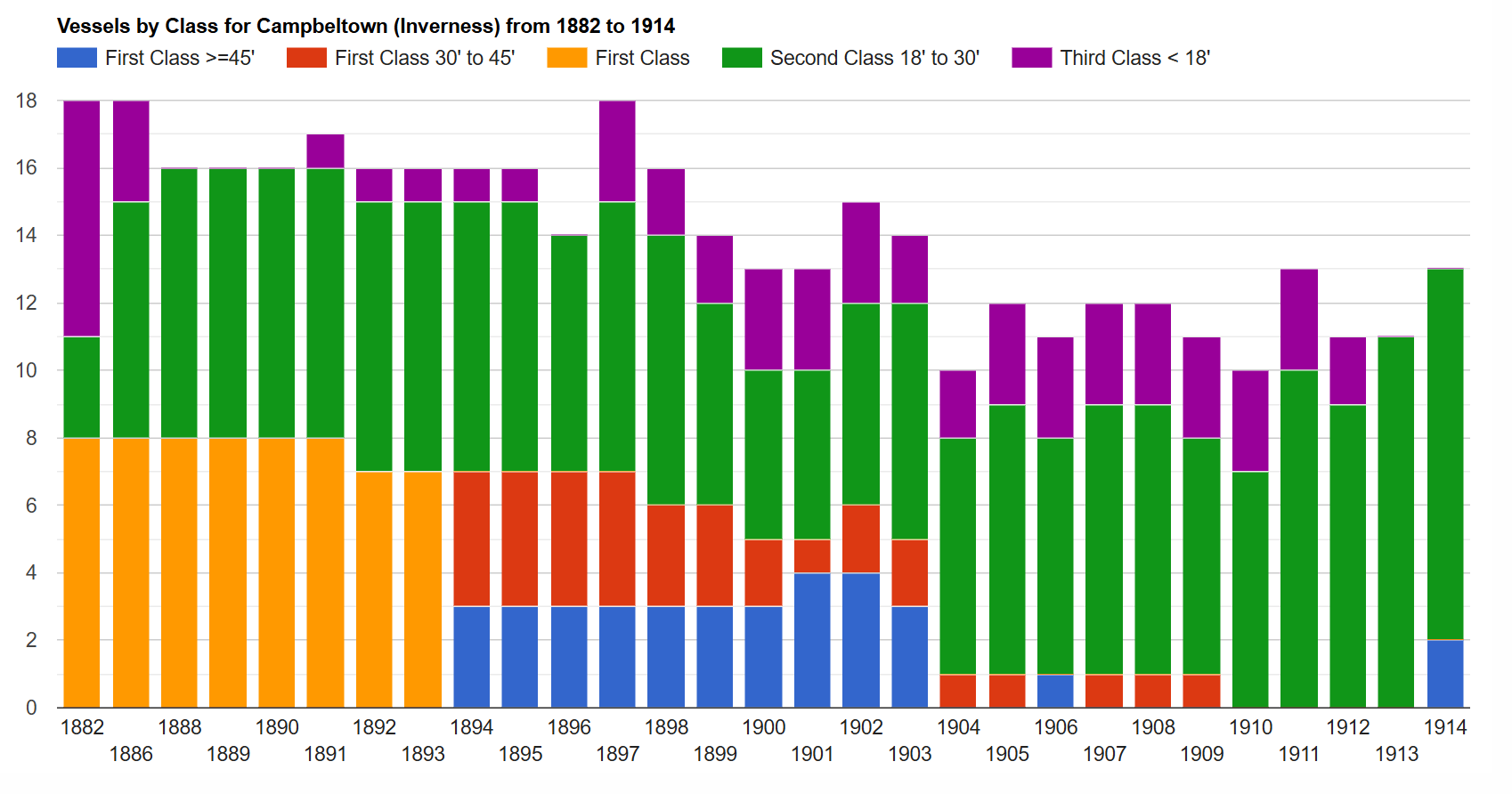
Vessels by class

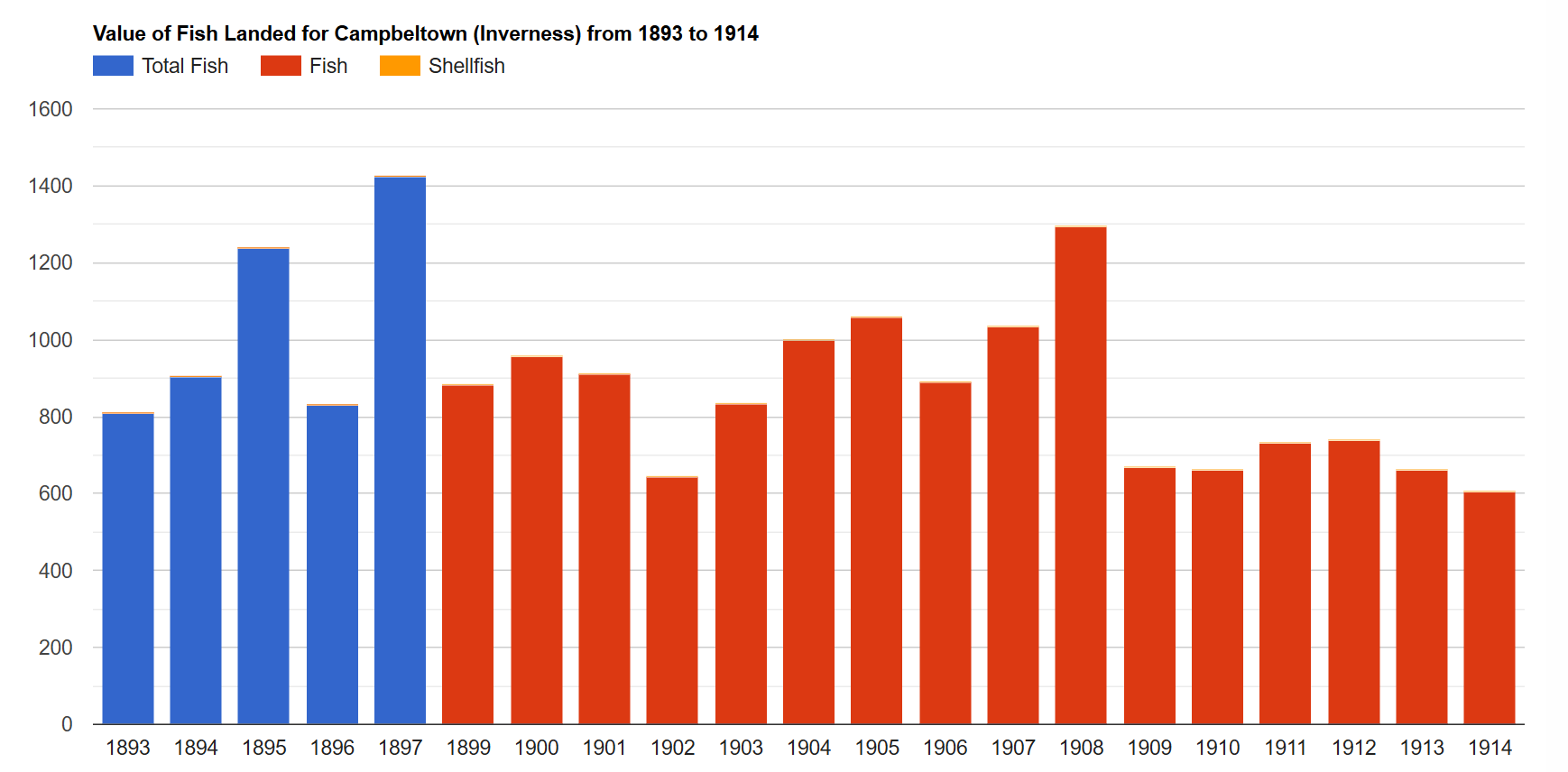
Value (£) of fish landed

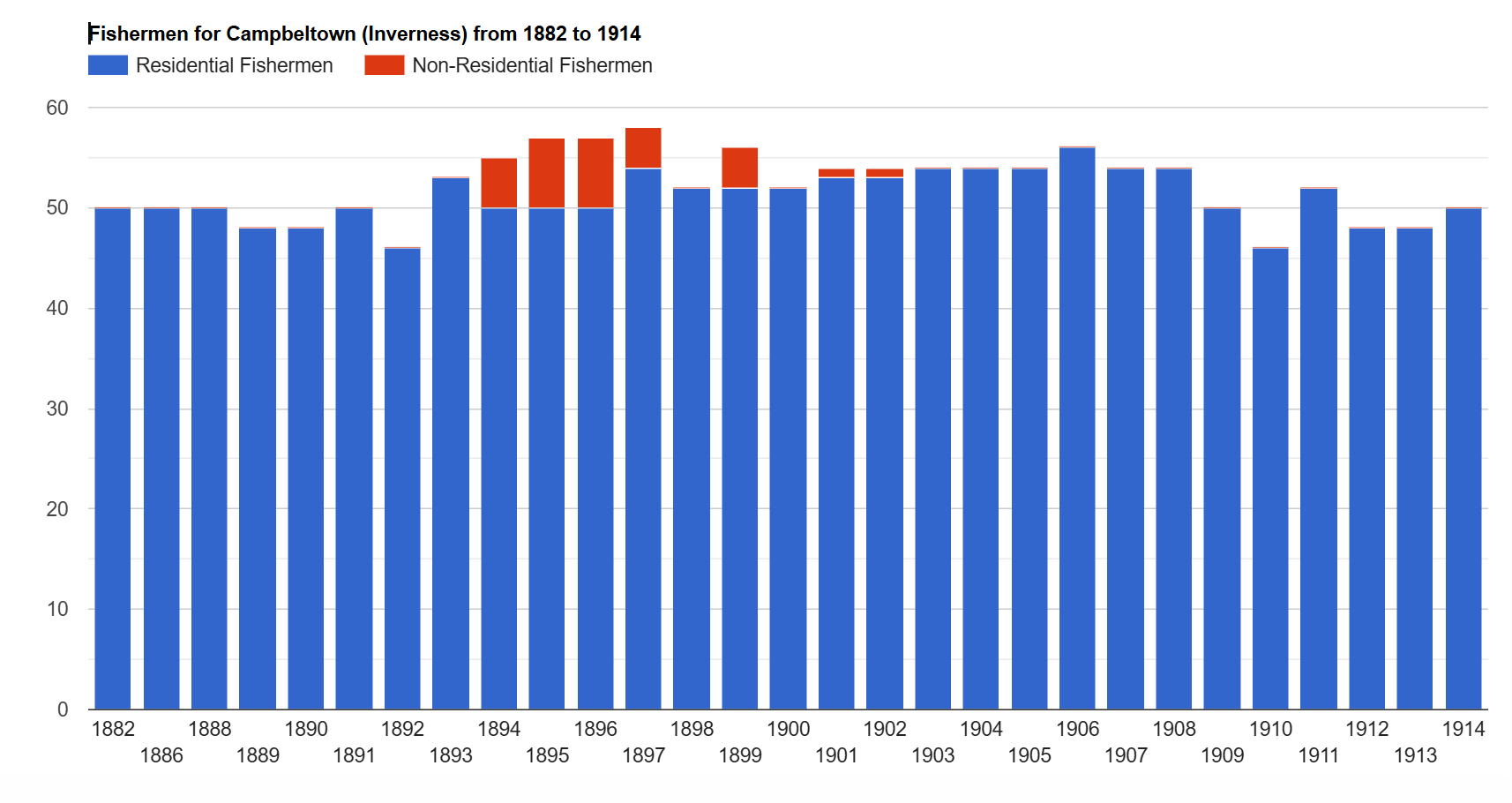
Fishermen

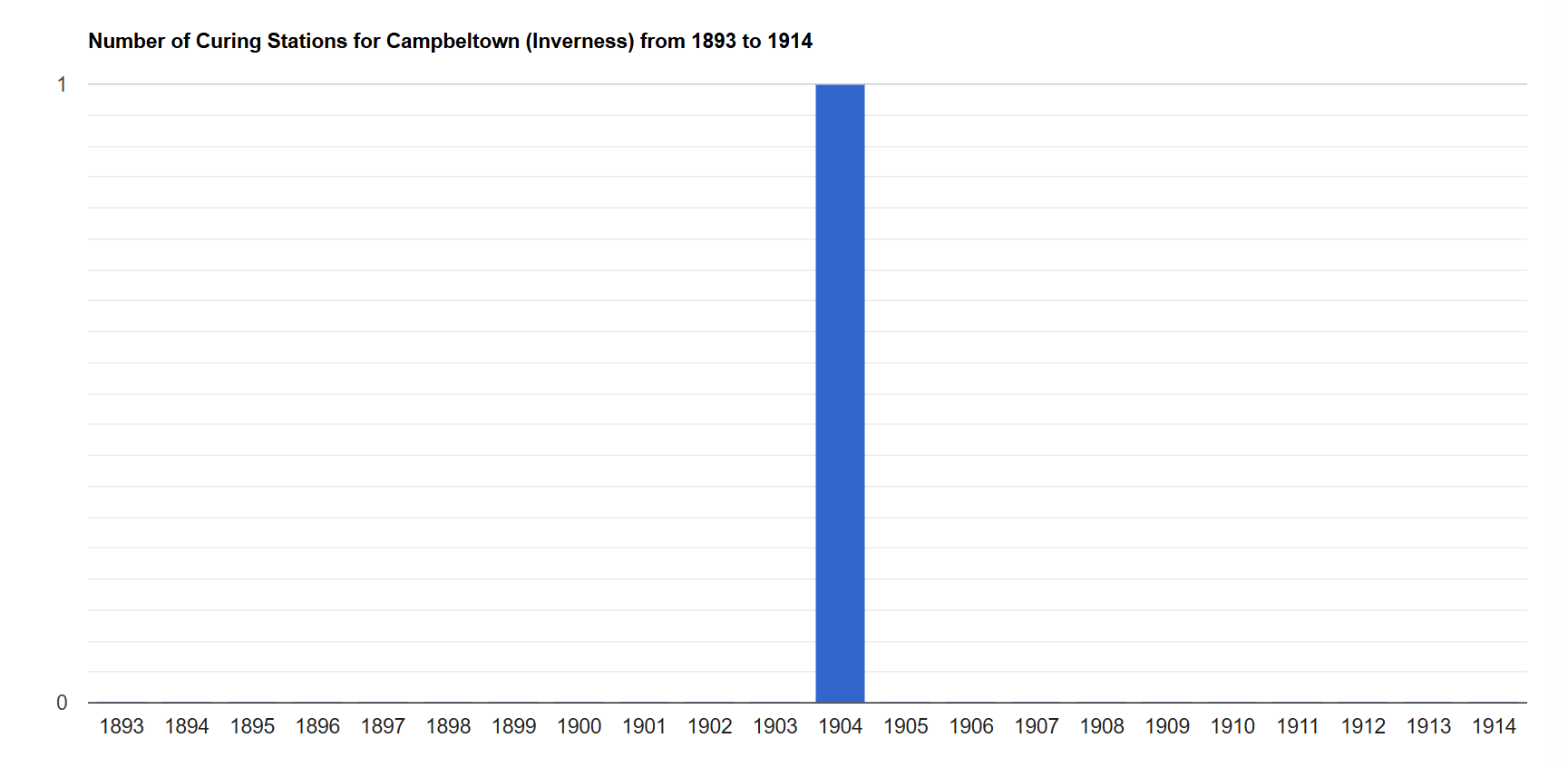
Number of curing stations

== Present ==
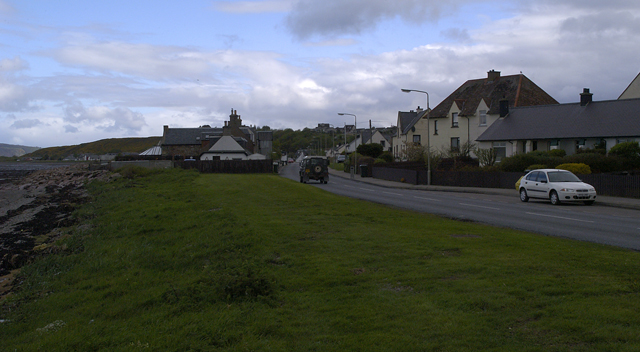
Ardersier in 2005

Today the village is a popular tourist spot due to the pleasant views, the shore, and the proximity to Fort George, which remains an active base for the British Army. The old Free Church is not in use and the 'new' 1880 church is a mission church within the new parish of Ardersier and Culloden. There are two small shops Morrisons & Spar, a pharmacy, a hairdressers, several B&Bs, and a pub with rooms.

Local residents formed their own community company in December 2009 to take over local community buildings to create a Community Hub.

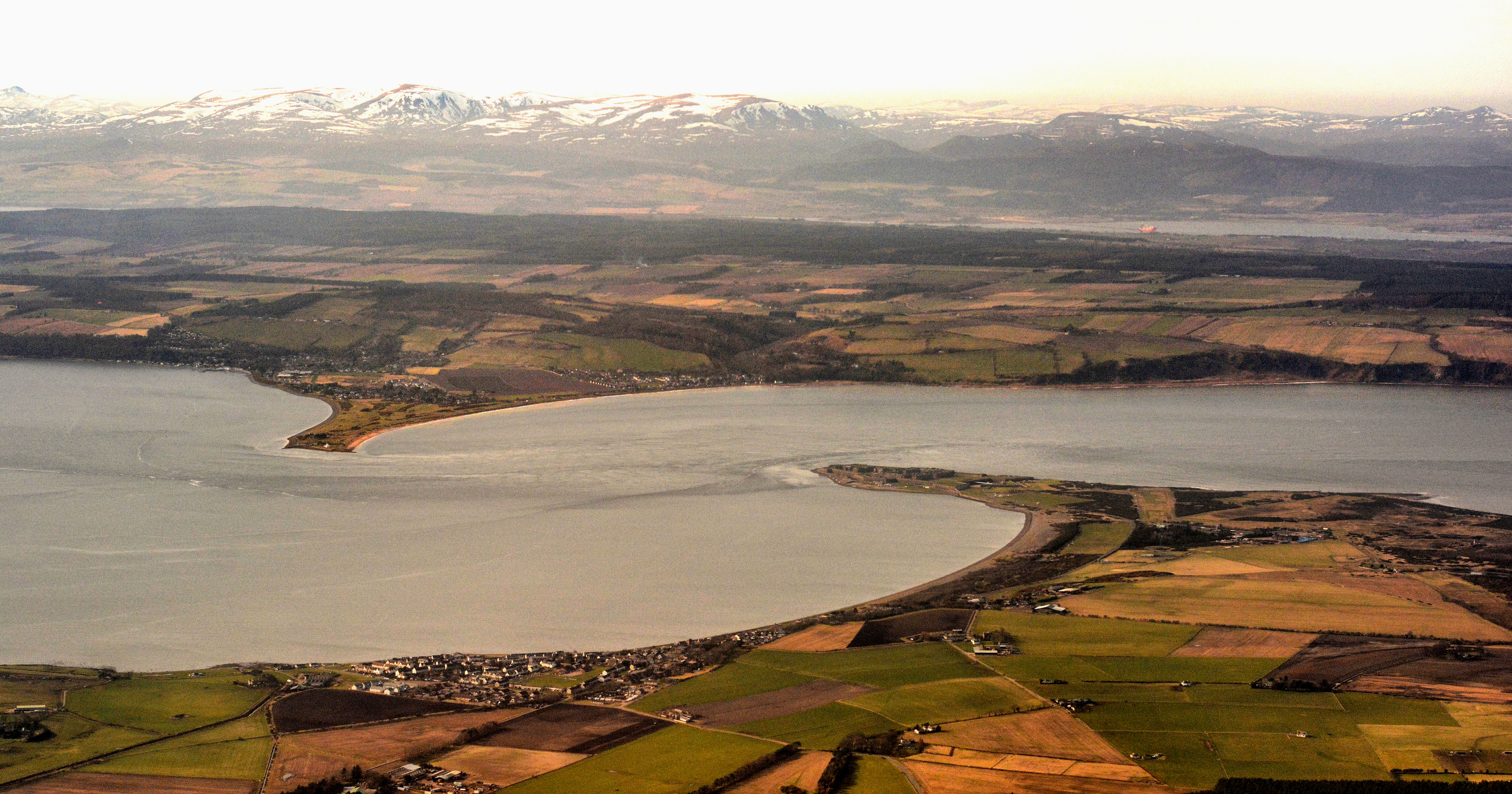
View of Ardersier, Chanonry Point, and Fort George

In 2013, refurbishing was started of Ardersier War Memorial Hall. It re-opened for the public in 2014.

== Notable residents ==
- Lorne Balfe, film composer
- Pryse Lockhart Gordon, memoirist
- Donald Laing, farmer and politician
- Herbert Macpherson, Victoria Cross recipient was born in the village
- Peter Peacock, Scottish Labour Party politician
- John Morrison, wrestler
