= Pryse Lockhart Gordon =

Scottish writer

- Born: 24 April 1762; Ardersier, Inverness-shire, Scotland
- Died: 2 September 1845 (aged 83); Cheltenham, Gloucestershire, England
- Occupation: Scottish writer

Pryse Lockhart Gordon (24 April 1762 – 2 September 1845), was a Scottish writer of memoirs.

== Life ==
Gordon was born 24 April 1762 at Ardersier, Inverness-shire, where his father, the Rev. Harry Gordon, was minister of the parish. After his father's death (15 March 1764) his mother went to live with her father, the Revd Walter Morrison, in Banffshire. Young Gordon was educated at the parish school of Banff, and subsequently at the University of Aberdeen, where he did not remain long, obtaining a commission in the Royal Marines at the age of fifteen. He was principally employed in recruiting, and seems to have seen no active service except a few cruises, which yielded him, he says, £17 in prize-money. In 1792 he obtained a commission in a regiment raised by the Duke of Gordon, and after five years' service in Scotland was allowed to accompany his friend Lord Montgomery, an invalid, to Italy, where he remained until 1801, returning to find his regiment disbanded.

He obtained employment at Menorca; but as he was on the point of embarking, 'my good fortune threw in my way an amiable young widow', whom he married in autumn 1801. This rendered him independent of military service. After living at Banff Castle and in Sloane Street, London, he went to Sicily with Lord Montgomery in 1811, and remained there until 1813, when he was prostrated by a sunstroke. The following year, after the end of the War of the Sixth Coalition, he took up his residence at Brussels, where he remained until his death. He died in Cheltenham on 2 September 1845. His only son, George Huntly Gordon, died on 27 December 1868 at the age of 72.

== Writings ==
In 1823 Gordon wrote a guide for travellers, entitled A Companion to Italy, the success of which led to the appearance of his Personal Memoirs in 1830. This contained reminiscences of notable persons known to the author, including Lady Hamilton, George Brydges Rodney, Richard Porson, Charles Burney, and James Perry of the Morning Chronicle. It sketches picture and antiquity hunting, at a time when bargains were to be had, and connoisseurs were liable to be imposed upon. Gordon himself obtained for Burney the copy of Constantine Lascaris's Grammar, the first Greek book printed, which went to the British Museum. There is a description of the English at Brussels on the eve of the Battle of Waterloo. His reminiscences of Rodney asserted that Rodney, upon his return to England, volunteered to Gordon an acknowledgement of his acquaintance with Clerk of Eldin's essay on naval tactics, and his indebtedness to it. In 1834 Gordon published Holland and Belgium, with notes on the Belgian Revolution and its causes.
