= Avoch Bay =

Body of water in the Scottish Highlands

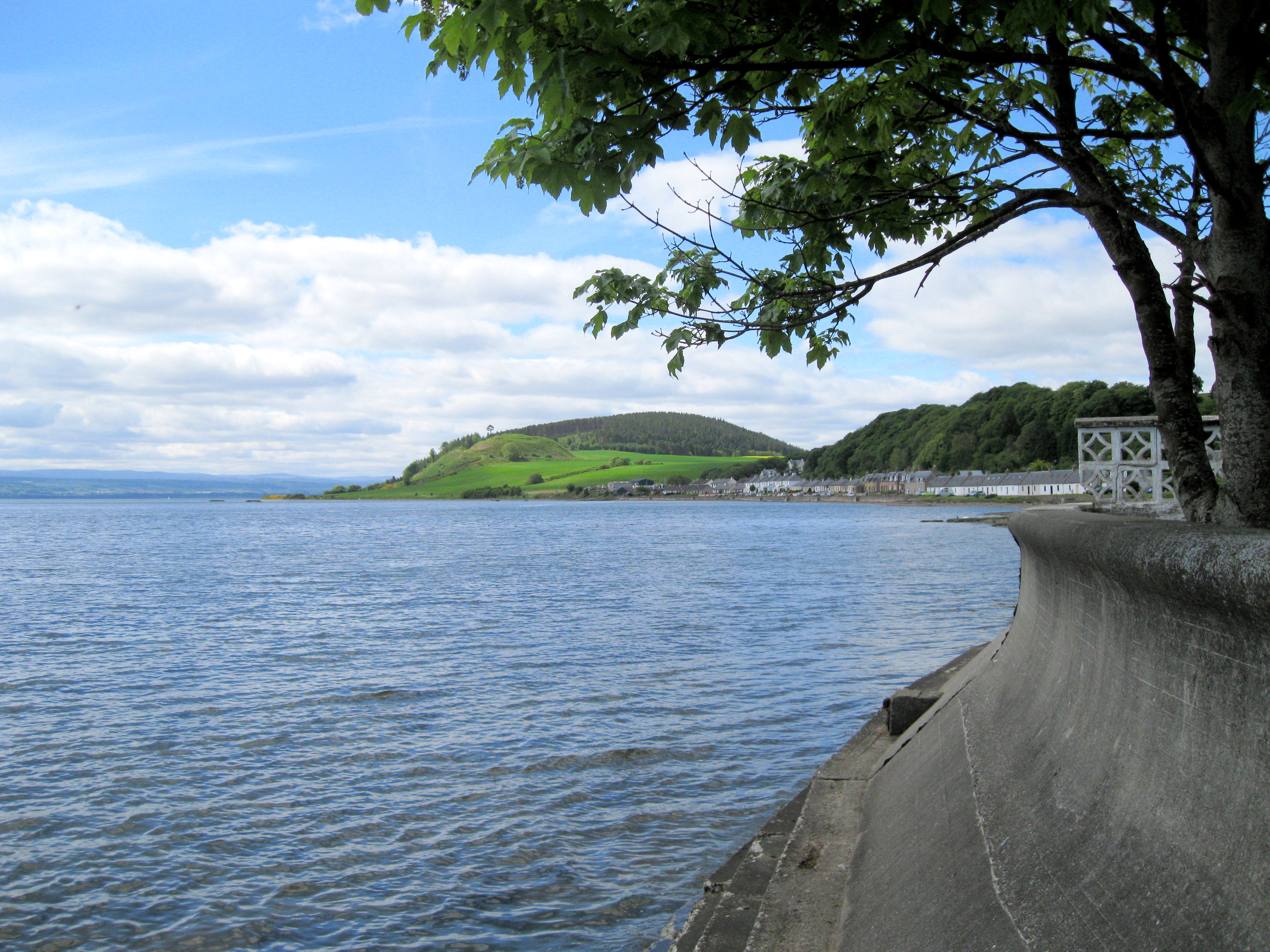
- View over Avoch Bay

- Location within Highland
- Location: Great Britain
- Coordinates: 57°34′15″N 4°8′30″W
- Part of: Moray Firth
- Primary inflows: Avoch Burn
- Basin countries: Scotland
- Max. length: 1.7 km (1.1 mi)
- Max. width: 5.3 km (3.3 mi)

Avoch Bay is a bay within the Moray Firth on the east coast of Scotland. It lies on the southern shore of the Black Isle peninsula and is part of the Highland council area, historically within the county of Ross-shire (administrative county of Ross and Cromarty).

== Geography ==
Avoch Bay is a shallow bay located on the northern shore of the Inner Moray Firth. It extends from Chanonry Point in the east to a headland at the base of the 79-metre-high Ormond Hill. Chanonry Point, along with the opposing headland near Fort George, constricts the Moray Firth to a width of 1.2 kilometres at this location, marking the start of the Inner Moray Firth. The bay is bordered by the settlements of Avoch (from which it takes its name) and Fortrose. The Avoch Burn stream empties into the bay at Avoch. The bay spans 5.3 kilometres in width and indents approximately 1.7 kilometres into the Black Isle landmass.

== Surroundings ==
The Chanonry Lighthouse at Chanonry Point marks the eastern end of the bay. The lighthouse was built in 1846 to a design by the Scottish engineer Alan Stevenson and is now a listed building. Southwest of the tower, the Chanonry Pier extends 228 metres into the bay. It once served as the landing point for the ferry to Ardersier, which began operations no later than 1744. In the 1810s, two harbours planned by Thomas Telford were constructed at Avoch Bay: Fortrose Harbour and Avoch Harbour. From Ormond Hill, the possibly royal castle Ormond Castle (also known as Castle of Avoch) overlooked the bay. It may have been built around 1179.

Between Avoch and Fortrose, the A832 runs as a coastal road along the bay. A railway branch line from Muir of Ord to Fortrose once ran parallel to it. It has since been closed and dismantled.
