= Chanonry Point =

Lighthouse on the Black Isle, Scotland

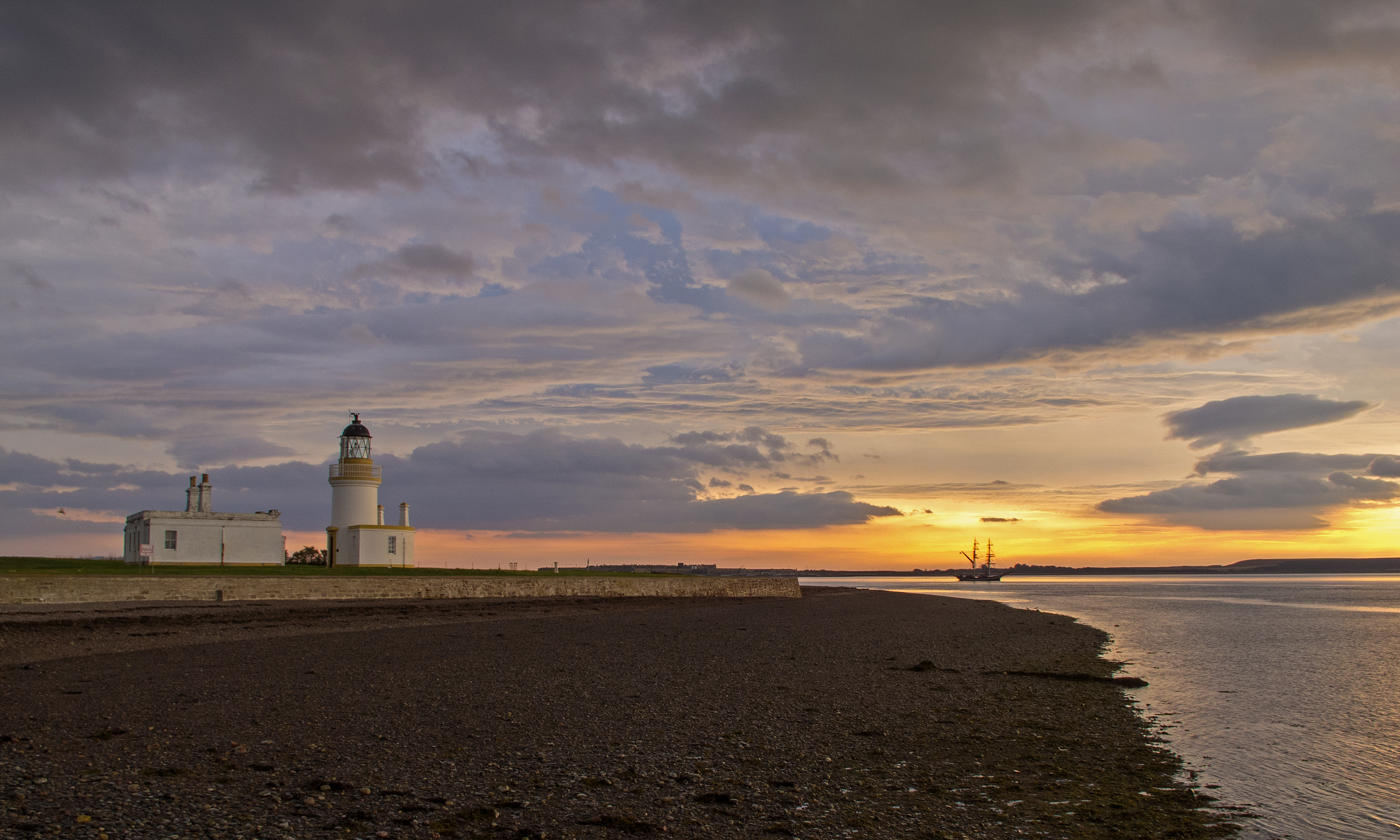
Early morning at Chanonry Point

Chanonry Point (Scottish Gaelic: Rubha na Cananaich) lies at the end of Chanonry Ness, a spit of land extending into the Moray Firth between Fortrose and Rosemarkie on the Black Isle, Scotland.

== Lighthouse ==
Chanonry Lighthouse
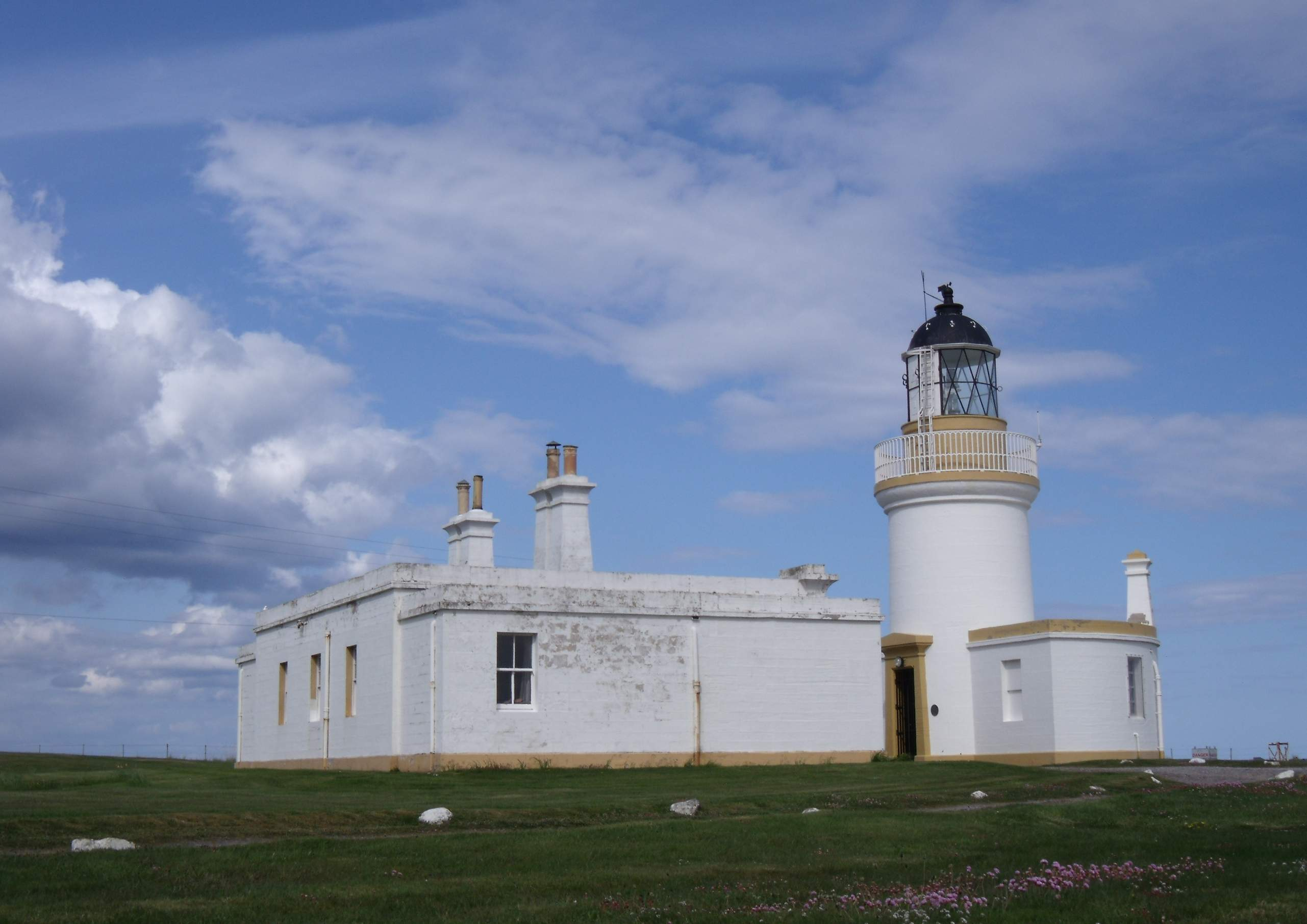
- Chanonry Lighthouse
- Location: Chanonry Point; Fortrose; Ross and Cromarty
- OS grid: NH7494455704
- Coordinates: 57°34′26″N 4°05′34″W

Tower
- Constructed: 1846
- Built by: Alan Stevenson
- Construction: masonry tower
- Automated: 1984
- Height: 13 m (43 ft)
- Shape: cylindrical tower with balcony and lantern
- Markings: white tower, black lantern, ochre trim
- Power source: mains electricity
- Operator: Northern Lighthouse Board
- Heritage: category A listed building
- Fog signal: Discont. 2001 (6 blasts in 90 secs.)

Light
- First lit: 15 May 1846
- Focal height: 12 m (39 ft)
- Light source: Electric Flashing Mains Powered LED Optic
- Range: 15 nautical miles (28 km; 17 mi)
- Characteristic: Oc W 6s. 12m 15M [Fl.4.5s - ec.1.5s] Visible W. 148°-073°

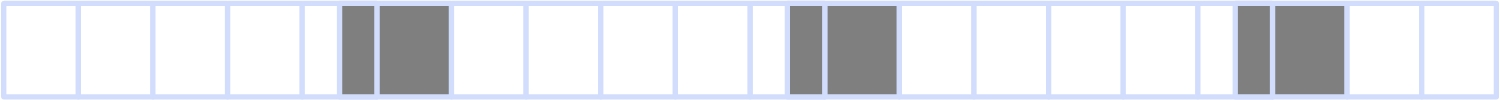

An active lighthouse situated at the tip of the point was designed by Alan Stevenson and was first lit in 1846. The lighthouse has been fully automated since 1984 and is operated by Northern Lighthouse Board.

== Bottlenose dolphin ==
Chanonry Point is one of the best spots in the UK to view bottlenose dolphin Tursiops truncatus from the land. The dolphins are often visible off Chanonry point, particularly on an incoming tide when they play and fish in the strong currents. Other wildlife, including porpoises and grey seals, can also regularly be spotted. European otters (Lutra lutra) are occasional visitors.

The Ness is home to two camping and caravan sites towards the north. Most of the promontory is taken up by Fortrose and Rosemarkie Golf Club.

Due to the popularity of the dolphins at Chanonry point, the parking area and roads leading up to the beach have become more and more congested during the summer months, causing concerns amongst local residents.

The death of Coinneach Odhar, more commonly known as the Brahan Seer, is commemorated by a memorial stone on the spot not far from where he is reputed to have been brutally executed.

=== Watching dolphins ===
While bottlenose dolphins can be seen off the point throughout the year, the chances of seeing them increase when their food supply increases, the peak times being when salmon are returning towards the two main rivers (the Ness and Beauly) which feed into the Moray Firth. The salmon come in with the tidal current which, once the tide starts to come in, can be extreme. If planning a trip, find tide details and pick days with midday low tides with the largest difference between low and high tide (spring tides, avoid the neap tides). An unofficial "jungle telegraph" system operates round the Rosemarkie campsite and point in June and on into August with details of the latest sightings only a brief conversation away. The University of Aberdeen operates a more formal range of surveys throughout the year from their field station based just along the coast at Cromarty, supported by funds from the Whale and Dolphin Conservation Society. While the Point is regarded by many people as the best place to watch the dolphins from land, licensed boat trips do run from Cromarty, Avoch and Inverness. The nearby Dolphin and Seal Centre at North Kessock also offers good dolphin watching opportunities during the summer months.

=== Photographing dolphins ===
Midsummer offers the best light for photography of bottlenose dolphins at the point, from late afternoon onwards. While early morning light is good, the direction of the point risks looking directly into the sun. The point has been featured in recent years on a wide range of television programmes, including the BBC's Coast series and nature programmes. These have greatly increased visitor numbers to the point. The wildlife requires no special equipment, but those looking for serious photography should pack a fast 200 mm to 300 mm lens.

== Getting there ==
Driving to the point, while possible, should be avoided on peak days, as parking space is limited. A path runs along the Rosemarkie side where more space is available. Allow 20 minutes walking time. The path arrives at the point. If you do drive through, you can walk round to the point following the path between two cottages, or along the beach from the small pier at the end of the road. The lighthouse grounds are private and the walls dangerous. There are no toilets at the point - the nearest are at Rosemarkie, either at the car park beside the Plough Inn or at Rosemarkie Beach Cafe. The point is exposed and offers little shelter even in summer. Parking and walking from Rosemarkie or Fortrose is strongly recommended.

== Gallery ==
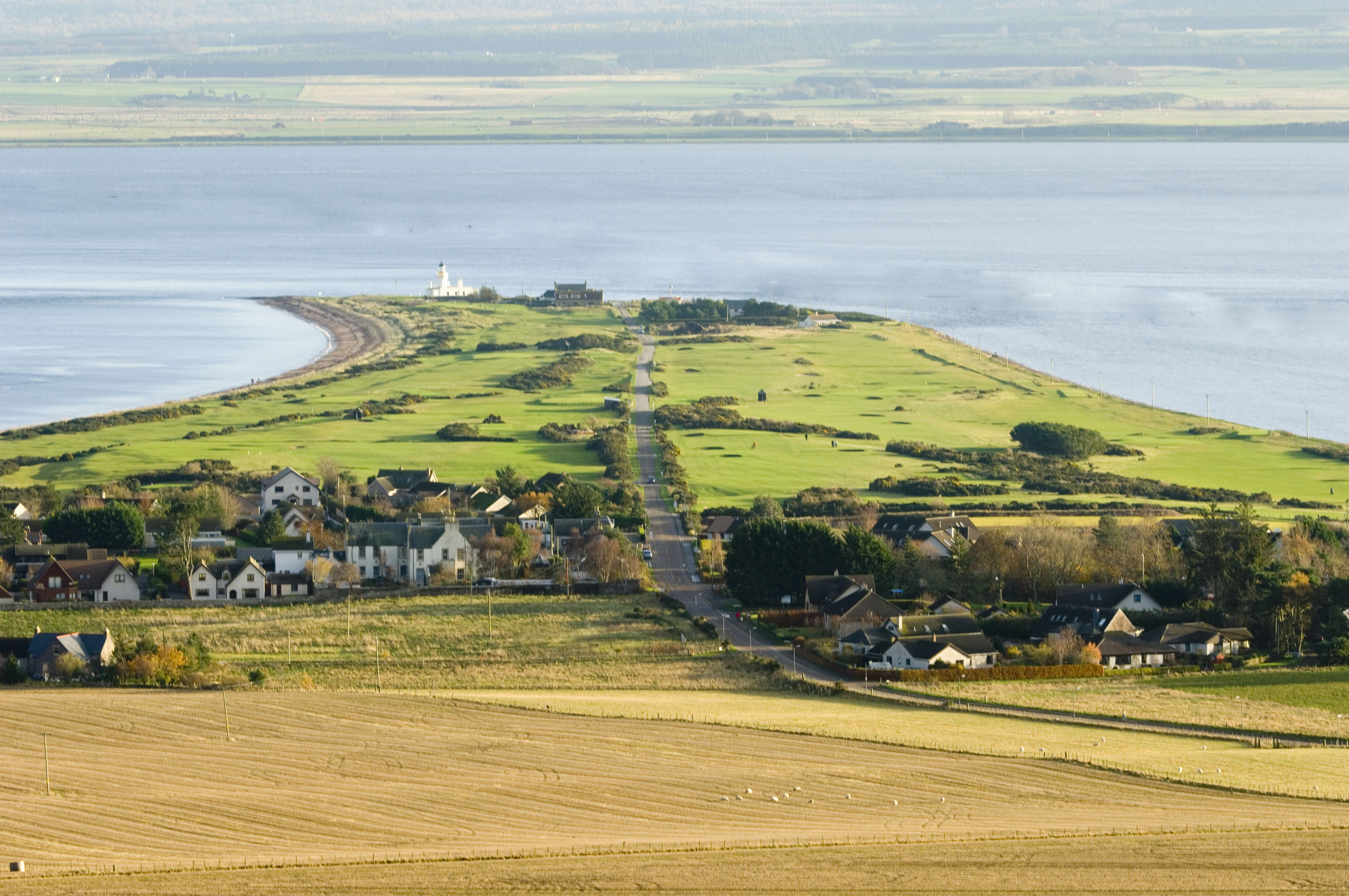
Chanonry Point

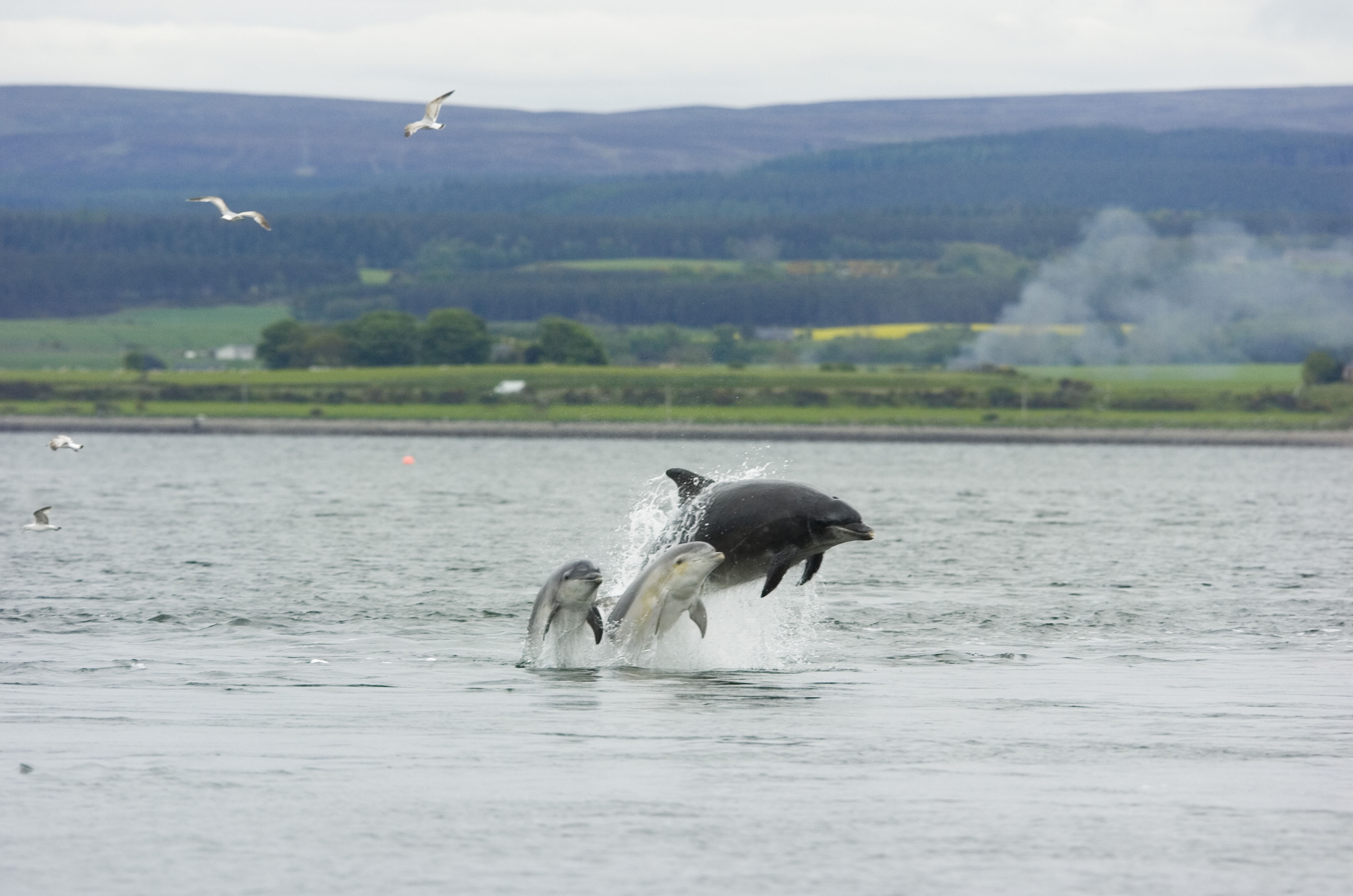
Adult female bottlenose and two young

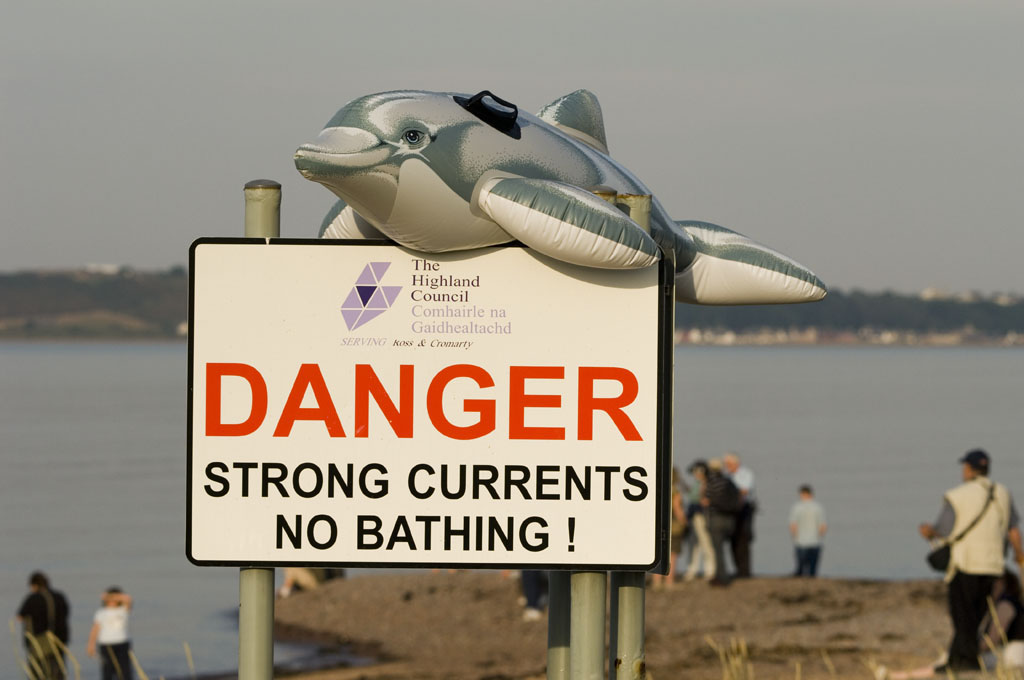
Summertime at Chanonry Point

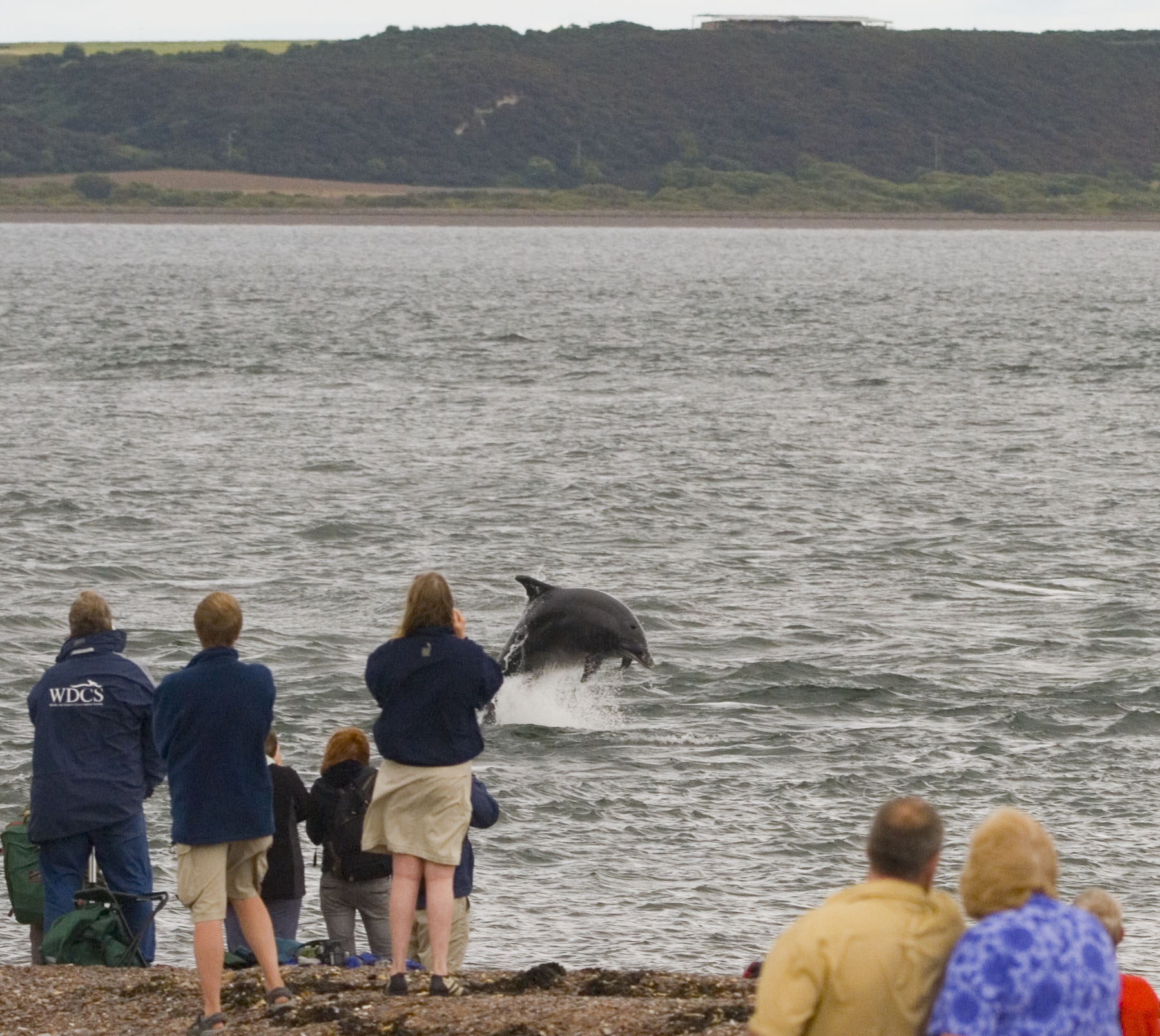
Dolphin close to Chanonry Point

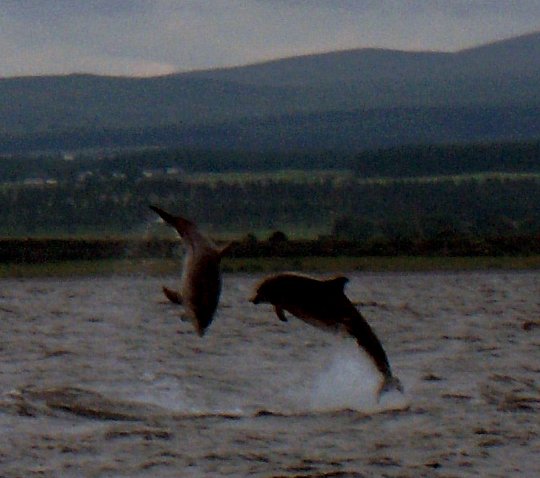
Dolphins jumping as seen from Chanonry Point

== See also ==
- Avoch Bay
- List of lighthouses in Scotland
- List of Northern Lighthouse Board lighthouses
