= Fortrose railway station =

Disused railway station in Highland, Scotland

Coordinates: 57.5821°N 4.1326°W

Fortrose
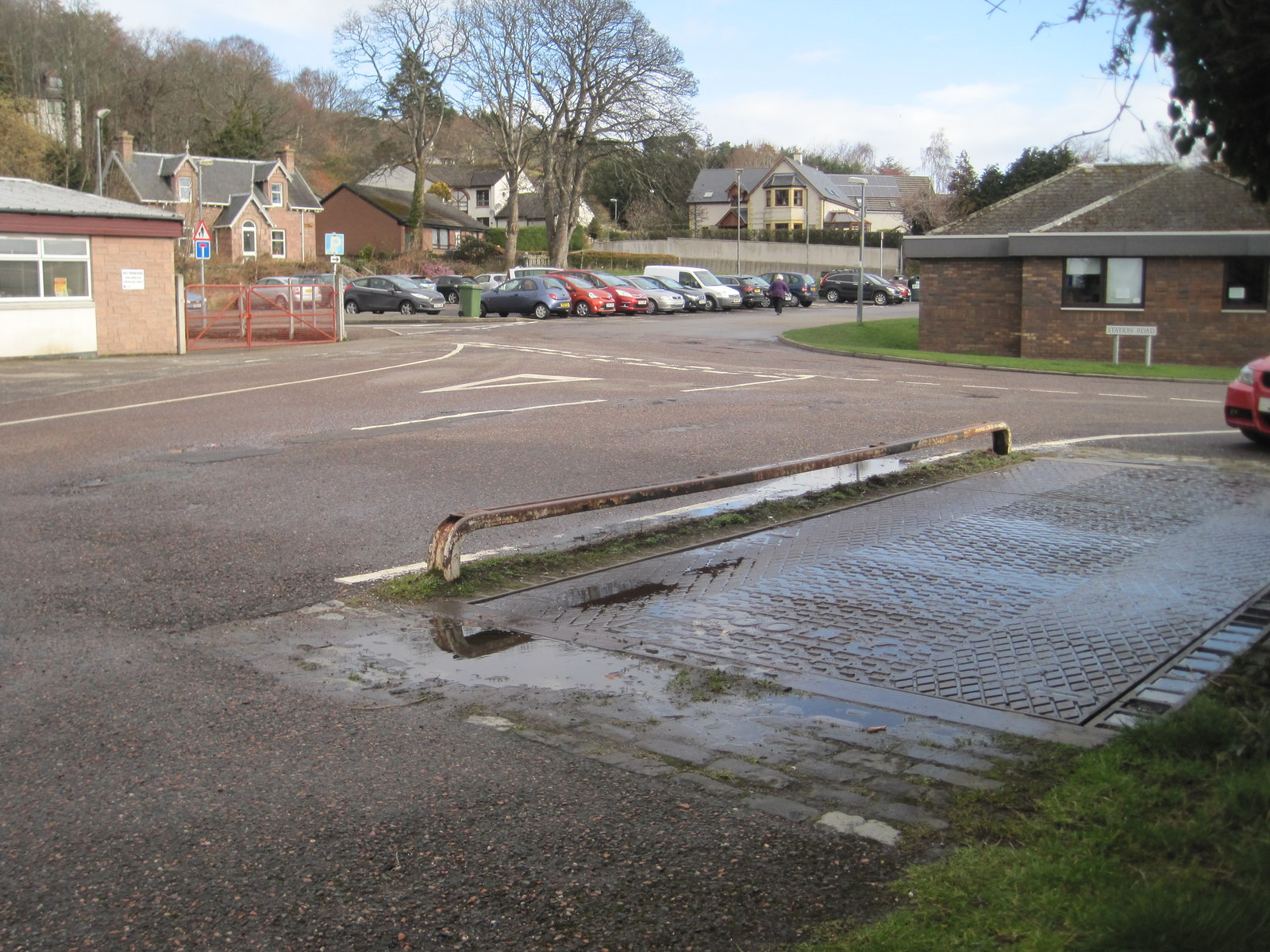
- The site of the station in 2015

General information
- Location: Fortrose, Ross and Cromarty; Scotland
- Platforms: 1

Other information
- Status: Disused

History
- Original company: Highland Railway
- Pre-grouping: Highland Railway
- Post-grouping: London, Midland and Scottish Railway; British Railways

Key dates
- 1 February 1894: station opened
- 1 October 1951: Station closed to passengers
- 13 June 1960: Line closed
Location

Fortrose was the terminus of a single track branch of the Highland Railway in north east Scotland. It connected villages in the Black Isle peninsula to the railway network via a junction at Muir of Ord.

Authorisation was obtained on 4 July 1890 to build a 15.75 mile (25 km) branch line from Muir of Ord to Rosemarkie; however the line never proceeded beyond Fortrose.

== Other stations ==
- Muir of Ord - still open
- Redcastle
- Allangrange
- Munlochy
- Avoch
- Fortrose - town

Preceding station	Disused railways	Following station
Avoch; Line and station closed	Highland Railway; Fortrose Branch	Terminus
