= Junor =

Junor is a surname. Notable people with the surname include:

- Daisy Junor (1919–2012), Canadian baseball player
- Eliza Junor (1804–1861), Scotswoman of mixed race who was the daughter of a former slave owner
- John Junor (1919–1997), Scottish journalist
- Judy Junor (born 1948), Canadian politician
- Kenneth William Junor (1896–1918), Canadian World War I flying ace
- Penny Junor (born 1949), English journalist and writer
- Robert Junor (1888 – 1957), Australian cricketer
