= Conon Bridge railway station =

Railway station in Highland, Scotland

Conon Bridge Scottish Gaelic: Drochaid Sguideil
- Looking south from the station

General information
- Location: Conon Bridge, Highland; Scotland
- Coordinates: 57.5617°N 4.4404°W
- Grid reference: NH540550
- Manager: ScotRail
- Platforms: 1

Other information
- Station code: CBD
- Classification: DfT category F2

History
- Original company: Inverness and Ross-shire Railway
- Pre-grouping: Highland Railway
- Post-grouping: London Midland and Scottish Railway

Key dates
- 11 June 1862: Opened as Conon
- 13 June 1960: Closed
- 8 February 2013: Reopened as Conon Bridge

Passengers
- 2021/22: ▲9,212
- 2022/23: ▲10,898
- 2023/24: ▲13,104
- 2024/25: ▼11,716
- 2025/26: ▲11,780
Location
Notes
- Passenger statistics from the Office of Rail and Road

Conon Bridge railway station serves the villages of Conon Bridge and Maryburgh in the Scottish Highlands. Initially known as Conon, it originally closed in 1960 and reopened on 8 February 2013. The station is on the Far North Line, located 16 miles 21 chains (26.2 km) from Inverness, between Muir of Ord and Dingwall.

== History ==
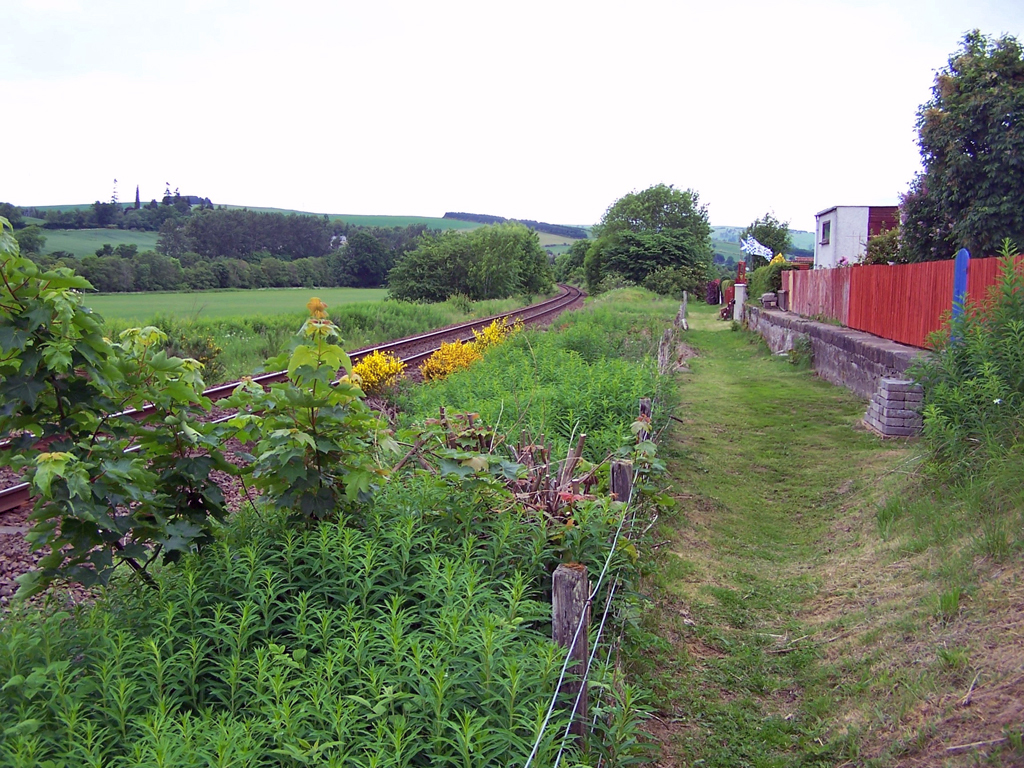
Site of Conon station, 2010

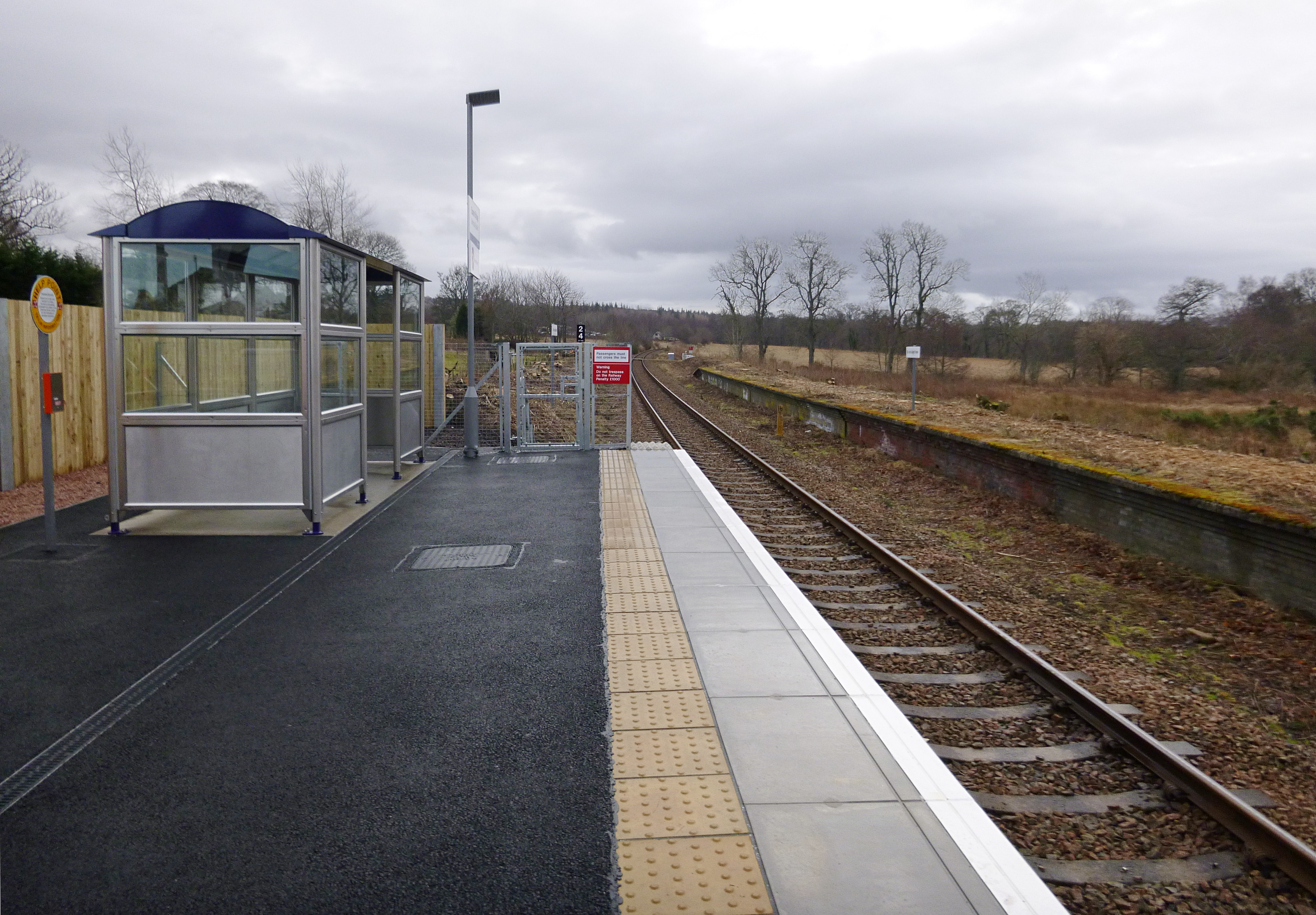
The station in 2013

The original railway station (then named just Conon) was opened by Inverness and Ross-shire Railway on 11 June 1862 and closed on 13 June 1960. The original station had two platforms and was the junction with the partially constructed Cromarty and Dingwall Light Railway.

Throughout the 2000s, a number of studies and pieces of analysis were used to assess the benefit of reopening the station.

The rebuilt station was projected to open by 2012 as Conon Bridge. In March 2012, Network Rail revealed that agreement had been reached with the Highlands and Islands Transport Partnership for it to provide £100,000 towards the construction of a single four-carriage platform at the station site. The new station was forecast to handle 36,000 passengers a year, including tourists and commuters to Inverness.

In September 2012, Scottish Government Transport Minister Keith Brown announced that a new station, expected to cost £600,000, would be built in time for a February 2013 opening, in time to help relieve traffic during the delayed £18 million pound resurfacing works to be carried out on the Kessock Bridge.

Construction was begun in November 2012 by Network Rail. A single platform around 15 metres long (similar to that at nearby Beauly railway station) was provided, together with a new waiting shelter, passenger information systems, cycle racks and lockers and a new car park, wider road access and enhanced street lighting. The project was supported by Highland Council, HiTRANS, Network Rail and First ScotRail. It reopened as scheduled and on budget on 8 February 2013. In the month following the station's opening, more than 2,000 journeys were made to or from it. According to Minister for Transport Keith Brown, the numbers "show that it was an extremely worthwhile investment".

== Facilities ==
The station has only basic facilities, these being a small waiting shelter, a car park, bike racks and a help point. As there are no facilities to purchase tickets, passengers must buy one in advance, or from the guard on the train.

== Platform layout ==
The station has a single platform which is long enough for a one-coach train.

== Passenger volume ==
The main origin or destination station for journeys to or from Conon Bridge station in the 2022/23 period was Inverness, making up 6,352 of the 10,898 journeys (58.29%).

Passenger Volume at Conon Bridge
	2012–13	2013–14	2014–15	2015–16	2016–17	2017–18	2018–19	2019–20	2020–21	2021–22	2022–23	2023–24	2024–25
Entries and exits	3,788	18,114	15,510	15,276	15,494	15,100	17,530	18,022	2,598	9,212	10,898	13,104	11,716

The statistics cover twelve month periods that start in April.

== Services ==
ScotRail Class 158 arrives at Conon Bridge with a service to Inverness

As of the December 2021 timetable, on weekdays and Saturdays, the station sees 11 trains northbound (3 to Wick via Thurso, 4 to Kyle of Lochalsh, 1 to Dingwall, 1 to Invergordon, 1 to Ardgay and 1 to Tain), and 13 trains southbound to Inverness. On Sundays, the station sees 6 trains northbound (1 to Wick, 1 to Kyle of Lochalsh, 1 to Invergordon and 3 to Tain), and 6 trains southbound.

Preceding station	National Rail	Following station
Muir of Ord	ScotRail; Far North Line; Kyle of Lochalsh line	Dingwall
	Historical railways	
Muir of Ord	Highland Railway; Inverness and Ross-shire Railway	Dingwall
Alcaig	Highland Railway; Cromarty and Dingwall Light Railway	Terminus

== Bibliography ==
- Brailsford, Martyn, ed. (December 2017) [1987]. Railway Track Diagrams 1: Scotland & Isle of Man (6th ed.). Frome: Trackmaps. ISBN 978-0-9549866-9-8.
- Butt, R. V. J. (October 1995). The Directory of Railway Stations: details every public and private passenger station, halt, platform and stopping place, past and present (1st ed.). Sparkford: Patrick Stephens Ltd. ISBN 978-1-85260-508-7. OCLC 60251199. OL 11956311M.
- Jowett, Alan (March 1989). Jowett's Railway Atlas of Great Britain and Ireland: From Pre-Grouping to the Present Day (1st ed.). Sparkford: Patrick Stephens Ltd. ISBN 978-1-85260-086-0. OCLC 22311137.
- Jowett, Alan (2000). Jowett's Nationalised Railway Atlas (1st ed.). Penryn, Cornwall: Atlantic Transport Publishers. ISBN 978-0-906899-99-1. OCLC 228266687.
