= Allangrange railway station =

Disused railway station in Highland, Scotland

Allangrange
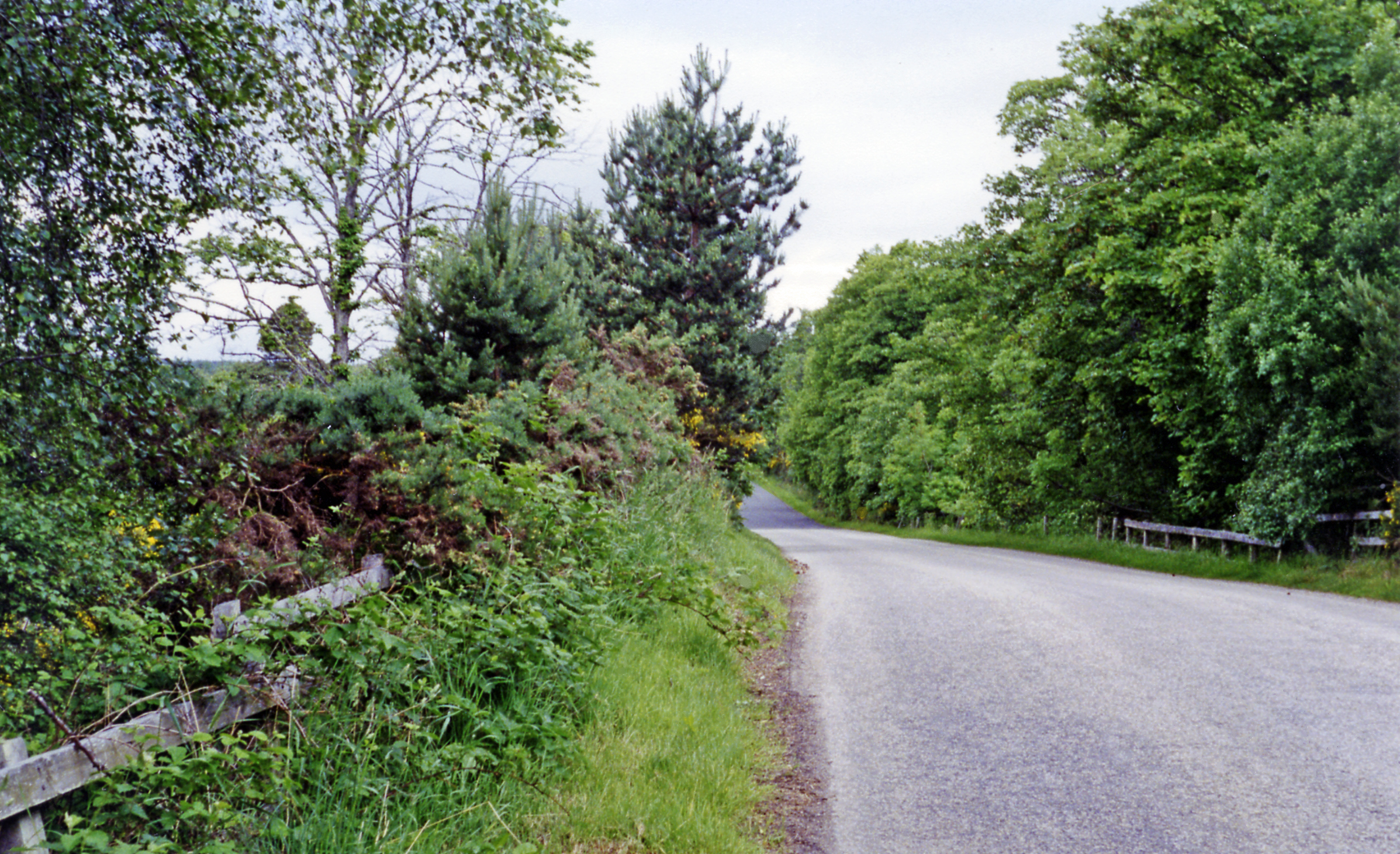
- Location of the station (1997)

General information
- Location: Black Isle, Ross and Cromarty; Scotland
- Coordinates: 57.535525°N 4.325578°W
- Grid reference: NH609518
- Platforms: 1

Other information
- Status: Disused

History
- Original company: Highland Railway
- Pre-grouping: Highland Railway
- Post-grouping: LMSR

Key dates
- 1 February 1894: Station opened
- 1 October 1951: Station closed to passengers
- 13 June 1960: Line closed
Location

Allangrange railway station was a station on the single track branch of the Highland Railway, in north east Scotland. The line connected villages in The Black Isle peninsula to the railway network via a junction at Muir of Ord.

== History ==
Opened by the Highland Railway, it became part of the London, Midland and Scottish Railway during the Grouping of 1923. The station then passed on to the Scottish Region of British Railways on nationalisation in 1948. It was then closed by British Railways.

Authorisation was obtained on 4 July 1890 to build a 15.75 mile (25 km) branch line from Muir of Ord to Rosemarkie; however the line never proceeded beyond Fortrose.

Preceding station	Historical railways	Following station
Redcastle	Highland Railway; Fortrose Branch	Munlochy
