= Munlochy railway station =

Disused railway station in Munlochy, Ross and Cromarty

Munlochy
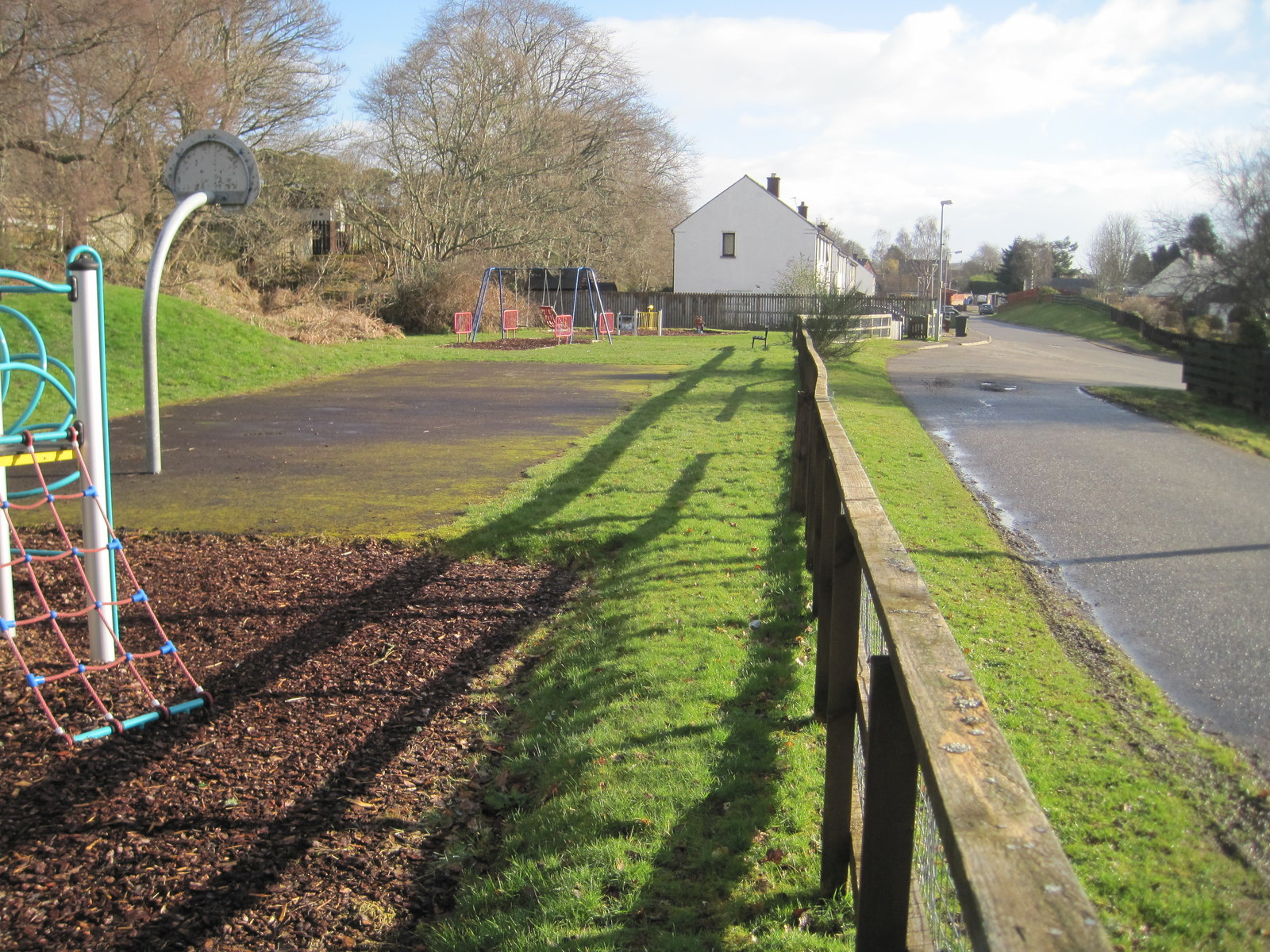

General information
- Location: Munlochy, Ross and Cromarty; Scotland
- Coordinates: 57.5495°N 4.2642°W
- Grid reference: NH646533
- Platforms: 1

Other information
- Status: Disused

History
- Original company: Highland Railway
- Pre-grouping: Highland Railway
- Post-grouping: London, Midland and Scottish Railway

Key dates
- 1 February 1894: Opened
- 1 October 1951: Closed
Location

Munlochy railway station served the village of Munlochy, Ross and Cromarty, Scotland, from 1894 to 1951 on the Fortrose Branch.

== History ==
The station was opened on 1 February 1894 by the Highland Railway. To the east was a goods yard, which had a goods shed, and by the level crossing was a railway cottage. The station closed on 1 October 1951.

Preceding station	Disused railways	Following station
Avoch; Line and station closed	Highland Railway; Fortrose Branch	Allangrange; Line and station closed
