= Cromarty and Dingwall Light Railway =

Defunct railway line in the Highlands of Scotland

Overview
- Locale: Scotland
- Dates of operation: 1914–1920

Technical
- Track gauge: 4 ft 8 1/2 in (1,435 mm)
- Length: 17 mi (27 km) (approximate) only 6 miles (10 km) built

The Cromarty and Dingwall Light Railway was a never-completed light railway linking Cromarty in the Black Isle, Ross and Cromarty, Scotland to the Highland Railway system at Conon.

== History ==
Although the southern coast of the Black Isle had been served since 1894 by the Highland Railway's Fortrose Branch, the northern portion was left "somewhat off the beaten track." A light railway running from Cromarty to Dingwall was proposed in 1897, as part of a wider programme to expand the Highland's network, to remedy this situation. The original scheme crossed the River Conon via "a bridge of considerable size" at Alcaig. However, a "fierce discussion" arose over whether the line should instead join the Highland Railway at Conon, avoiding the cost of the bridge. The dispute was resolved in favour of the Conon option when the Light Railway Commission "refused all assistance" if the Alcaig bridge were adopted.

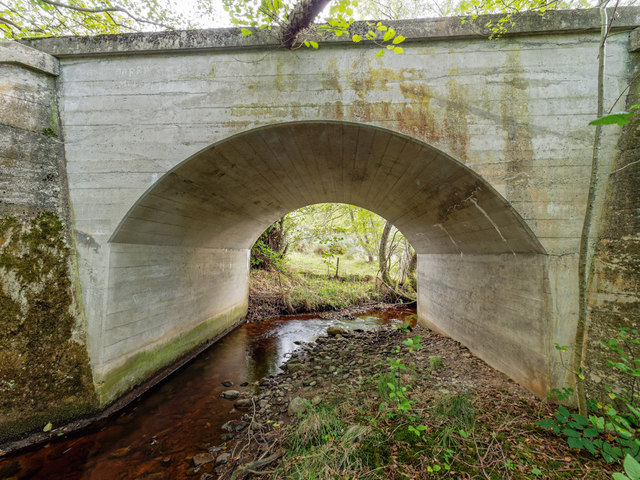
Cromarty Dingwall Railway Bridge.

The Cromarty and Dingwall Light Railway Order 1902 was obtained on 1 August 1902. However, further delays had arisen while the line's promoters negotiated with the Highland Railway to enable trains to continue over its tracks from Conon Bridge to Dingwall, and this situation was not resolved until after the order was issued. Construction eventually began from the Cromarty end, rather than from the junction, due to "considerable difficulty in the acquisition of certain lands." Moreover, progress was slow, and Extension of Time Orders were obtained in 1907 and 1910.

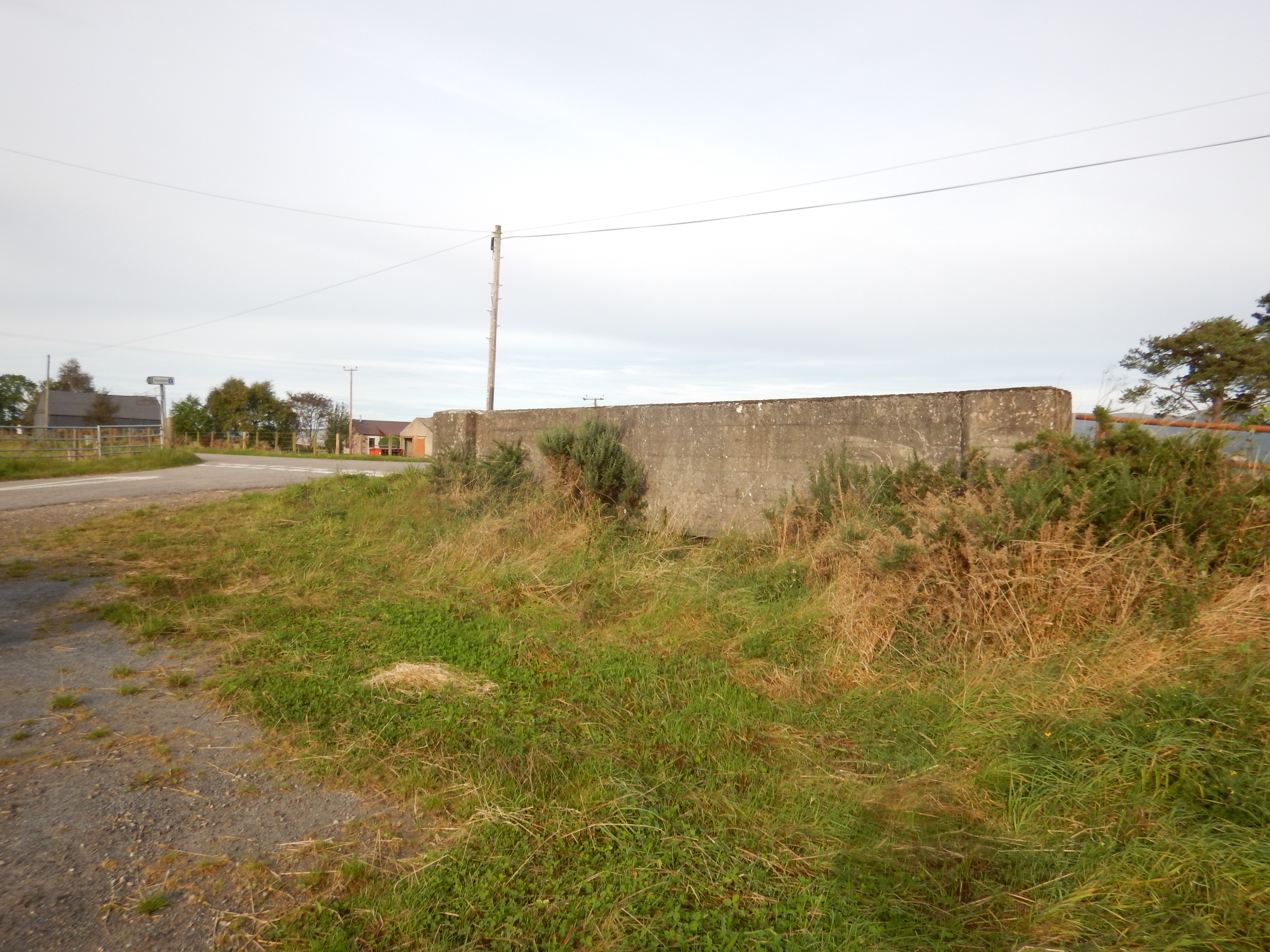
Remains of Cullicudden Farm Railway Bridge.

By 1914, about six miles of track had been constructed at the Cromarty end, and works, including a "substantial bridge" at Cullicudden Farm, were well advanced on an additional two miles, although work had not commenced on the remaining 11 miles. Work was suspended at the outbreak of World War I and the track lifted "about a year later" for use elsewhere. No further action was taken to complete the line.

Stations were planned at Cromarty, Newhall, Drumcudden, Culbokie and Alcaig.

== Connections to other lines ==
- Inverness and Ross-shire Railway at Conon
