= Alcaig =

Coordinates: 57.58°N 04.41°W

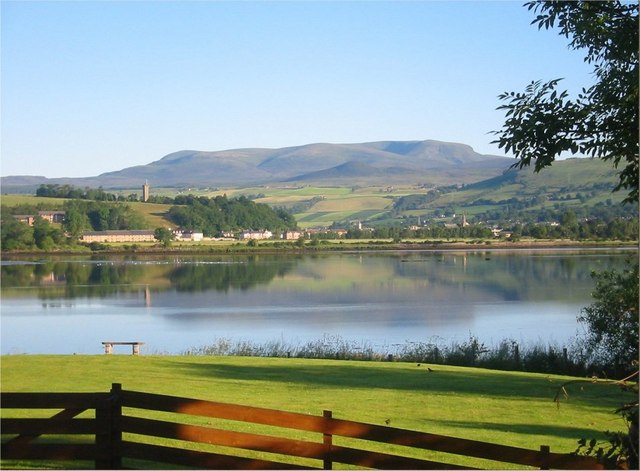
- View over Dingwall to Ben Wyvis, from Alcaig

- Location within the Ross and Cromarty area
- OS grid reference: NH5657
- Council area: Highland
- Country: Scotland
- Sovereign state: United Kingdom
- Police: Scotland
- Fire: Scottish
- Ambulance: Scottish
- UK Parliament: Ross, Skye and Lochaber
- Scottish Parliament: Skye, Lochaber and Badenoch

Alcaig (Old Norse which means Auk Bay: Alcaig) is a village located close to Conon Bridge in Dingwall, Ross-shire in Highland, and is within the Scottish council area of Highland.
