= Conon Bridge =

Coordinates: 57.56667°N 4.43333°W

Conon Bridge: Scottish Gaelic: Drochaid Sguideil; Scots: Logiebride or Logie Riach
- Location within the Ross and Cromarty area
- Population: 2,190 (2020)
- OS grid reference: NH545555
- Council area: Highland
- Lieutenancy area: Ross and Cromarty
- Country: Scotland
- Sovereign state: United Kingdom
- Post town: DINGWALL
- Postcode district: IV7
- Dialling code: 01349
- Police: Scotland
- Fire: Scottish
- Ambulance: Scottish
- UK Parliament: Caithness, Sutherland and Easter Ross
- Scottish Parliament: Skye, Lochaber and Badenoch

Conon Rail Bridge

Conon Bridge (Scottish Gaelic: Drochaid Sguideil, pronounced [ˈt̪ɾɔxɪtʲ ˈs̪kutʲal]) is a village in the Highland region of Scotland. The current Gaelic name is likely a neologism: the bridge was not built until the early 19th century and some early gravestones show the name sgudal or scuddle. One suggested source is the Old Norse "sku dal", valley of the fine views.

Situated near the market town of Dingwall, on the southern bank of the River Conon, in Ross-shire, it is at the western end of the Cromarty Firth. The village of Maryburgh is on the other side of the river.

Conon Bridge has a railway station on the line between Dingwall (the nearest town) and Inverness (the nearest city), which re-opened on 8 February 2013. This had been proposed as a candidate for reopening after the success of doing so with nearby Beauly railway station. In September 2012 the Minister for Housing and Transport Keith Brown confirmed it would reopen by February 2013 to offer an alternative to commuters during resurfacing work on the Kessock Bridge from February to June 2013.

Amenities at present are a small fraction of what they once were, hosting a Spar shop, Post Office, two hairdressing salons, a bar and separate hotel. It also has its own primary school, whose pupils then go on to Dingwall Academy. There is also a recently opened pharmacy and a Co-op store opened in 2017. The only church situated within the village itself is the Ferintosh Parish Church, a growing Church of Scotland congregation.

Private housing in the village is complemented by council estates. Future plans for the village include more exclusive, private housing schemes, a new primary school, a doctors' surgery and more shopping facilities for residents. A new small shopping complex opened up on the east side of the village in early 2017.
