= Redcastle railway station =

Disused railway station in Killearnan, Ross and Cromarty

Redcastle
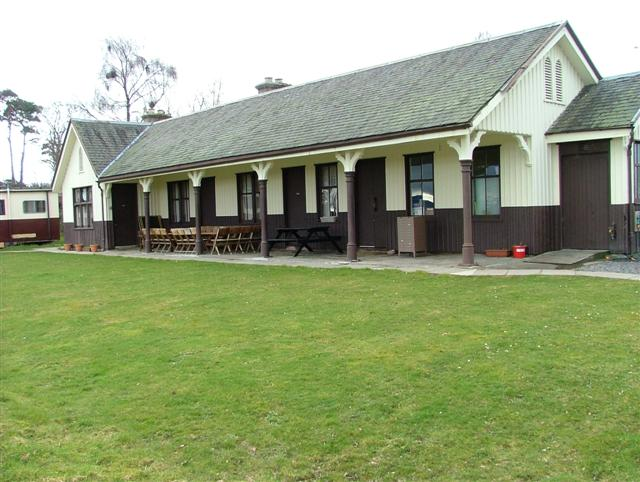
- The site of the station in 2007

General information
- Location: Killearnan, Ross and Cromarty; Scotland
- Coordinates: 57.5278°N 4.3691°W
- Grid reference: NH582511
- Platforms: 1

Other information
- Status: Disused

History
- Original company: Highland Railway
- Pre-grouping: Highland Railway
- Post-grouping: London, Midland and Scottish Railway

Key dates
- 1 February 1894: Opened
- 1 October 1951: Closed
Location

Redcastle railway station served the parish of Killearnan, Ross and Cromarty, Scotland, from 1894 to 1951 on the Fortrose Branch.

== History ==
The station was opened on 1 February 1894 by the Highland Railway. At the east end was the goods yard, which had a goods shed and a loading bank. The station closed on 1 October 1951.

Preceding station	Disused railways	Following station
Allangrange; Line and station closed	Highland Railway; Fortrose Branch	Muir of Ord; Line closed, station open
