= List of listed buildings in Fortrose, Highland =

This is a list of listed buildings in the parish of Fortrose in Highland, Scotland.

== List ==
Name	Location	Date listed	Grid ref. (Note: Sometimes known as OSGB36, the grid reference (where provided) is based on the British national grid reference system used by the Ordnance Survey. • "Guide to National Grid". Ordnance Survey. • "Get-a-map". Ordnance Survey.)	Geo-coordinates	Notes	LB number (Note: Historic Environment Scotland assign a unique alphanumeric identifier to each designated site in Scotland, for listed buildings this always begins with "LB", for example "LB12345".)	Image
4 Bridge Street	Rosemarkie			57°35′32″N 4°06′57″W	Category C(S)	31842	Upload Photo
High Street Groam Cottage	Rosemarkie			57°35′29″N 4°06′53″W	Category C(S)	31849	Upload Photo
Rosmarkie, 48 High Street, The Plough Inn	Rosemarkie			57°35′31″N 4°06′54″W	Category C(S)	31863	Upload another image See more images
Chanonry Ice House	Chanonry Point			57°34′28″N 4°05′48″W	Category C(S)	31798	Upload another image
Chanonry Pier	Chanonry Point			57°34′24″N 4°05′38″W	Category C(S)	31800	Upload another image See more images
12 Academy Street, Ruthven	Fortrose			57°34′50″N 4°07′53″W	Category B	31805	Upload Photo
Canonbury Terrace Craigdhu	Fortrose			57°34′44″N 4°08′20″W	Category C(S)	31811	Upload Photo
3 Cathedral Square (Springfield) And 24 High Street And Post Office	Fortrose			57°34′52″N 4°07′55″W	Category B	31814	Upload Photo
7 Cathedral Square Town House	Fortrose			57°34′53″N 4°07′52″W	Category B	31815	Upload another image
22 High Street	Fortrose			57°34′52″N 4°07′55″W	Category B	31828	Upload Photo
3 And 4 The Shore (Rose Cottage And Fuschia Cottage)	Fortrose			57°34′46″N 4°08′02″W	Category C(S)	31836	Upload Photo
8 (Fulmar) And 10 Bridge Street	Rosemarkie			57°35′33″N 4°06′59″W	Category C(S)	31840	Upload Photo
1 High Street (Ellan Donan)	Rosemarkie			57°35′24″N 4°06′56″W	Category B	31843	Upload Photo
28 High Street	Rosemarkie			57°35′28″N 4°06′54″W	Category C(S)	31851	Upload Photo
26 High Street	Rosemarkie			57°35′27″N 4°06′54″W	Category C(S)	31852	Upload Photo
Ferry House	Chanonry Point			57°34′26″N 4°05′38″W	Category C(S)	31797	Upload another image
Chanonry Lighthouse, Keeper's House, Wall And Gatepiers	Chanonry Point			57°34′27″N 4°05′34″W	Category A	31799	Upload another image See more images
4 Academy Street Flowerburn Cottage	Fortrose			57°34′50″N 4°07′54″W	Category C(S)	31807	Upload Photo
Harbour Road, Former West End Stores	Fortrose			57°34′43″N 4°08′12″W	Category C(S)	31819	Upload Photo
15 High Street Woodside, And Walls	Fortrose			57°34′51″N 4°08′01″W	Category C(S)	31820	Upload Photo
17 And 19 And 21 High Street	Fortrose			57°34′51″N 4°07′59″W	Category B	31821	Upload Photo
9 Union Street	Fortrose			57°34′51″N 4°07′44″W	Category B	31837	Upload Photo
Union Street And High Street Royal Hotel (The Anderson)	Fortrose			57°34′54″N 4°07′50″W	Category B	31839	Upload another image See more images
8 High Street Duart	Rosemarkie			57°35′25″N 4°06′55″W	Category C(S)	31858	Upload Photo
Academy Street, St Andrew's Episcopal Church	Fortrose			57°34′47″N 4°07′46″W	Category B	31803	Upload another image See more images
Academy Street Meadow Bank, And Out-Buildings, Walls And Gate Piers	Fortrose			57°34′49″N 4°07′50″W	Category B	31804	Upload Photo
6 Canonbury Terrace, Brae House	Fortrose			57°34′47″N 4°08′09″W	Category C(S)	31808	Upload Photo
10 Canonbury Terrace (Canonbury House)	Fortrose			57°34′45″N 4°08′11″W	Category B	31809	Upload Photo
Cathedral Square, Fortrose Cathedral (Ss. Peter And Bonifacius Graveyard And Walls	Fortrose			57°34′51″N 4°07′50″W	Category A	31812	Upload Photo
Church Street Platcock House	Fortrose			57°35′01″N 4°07′56″W	Category B	31818	Upload Photo
32 High Street And 8 Cathedral Square Dromquinna	Fortrose			57°34′53″N 4°07′52″W	Category B	31827	Upload Photo
High Street Groam House	Rosemarkie			57°35′29″N 4°06′54″W	Category B	31848	Upload another image See more images
12 And 14 High Street (K Cumming, Butcher)	Rosemarkie			57°35′26″N 4°06′55″W	Category C(S)	31856	Upload Photo
Mansebrae Gollanhead House And Gollanhead Cottage	Rosemarkie			57°35′23″N 4°07′00″W	Category C(S)	31860	Upload Photo
Mansebrae Old Manse Steading	Rosemarkie			57°35′17″N 4°07′08″W	Category C(S)	31862	Upload Photo
Academy Street, The Deanery And Garden Pavilion And Gatepiers And Garden Wall	Fortrose			57°34′48″N 4°07′45″W	Category B	31802	Upload Photo
23 High Street Bank Of Scotland	Fortrose			57°34′52″N 4°07′58″W	Category B	31822	Upload Photo
2 High Street The Anchorage	Fortrose			57°34′47″N 4°08′05″W	Category B	31831	Upload Photo
Ness Road Ness Cottage	Fortrose			57°34′53″N 4°06′46″W	Category C(S)	31833	Upload Photo
The Shore The Harbour	Fortrose			57°34′42″N 4°08′02″W	Category B	31835	Upload another image See more images
6 Bridge Street	Rosemarkie			57°35′32″N 4°06′58″W	Category C(S)	31841	Upload Photo
3 And 5 High Street	Rosemarkie			57°35′25″N 4°06′56″W	Category C(S)	31844	Upload Photo
25 High Street (Mendoza)	Rosemarkie			57°35′28″N 4°06′55″W	Category B	31847	Upload Photo
22 High Street Glencairn	Rosemarkie			57°35′27″N 4°06′54″W	Category C(S)	31855	Upload Photo
6 High Street	Rosemarkie			57°35′25″N 4°06′55″W	Category C(S)	31859	Upload Photo
Mansebrae, The Old Manse	Rosemarkie			57°35′18″N 4°07′06″W	Category B	31861	Upload Photo
K6 Telephone Kiosk Adjacent To Entry To Cathedral	Fortrose			57°34′54″N 4°07′51″W	Category B	31864	Upload Photo
8 And 10 Academy Street, Seaforth Place	Fortrose			57°34′50″N 4°07′53″W	Category B	31806	Upload Photo
Cathedral Square Chapter House	Fortrose			57°34′51″N 4°07′48″W	Category A	31813	Upload Photo
Church Street, Town Hall	Fortrose			57°34′57″N 4°07′54″W	Category B	31817	Upload another image
33 High Street	Fortrose			57°34′53″N 4°07′55″W	Category C(S)	31823	Upload Photo
2 And 4 Rose Street, Angel Court And Rose Court	Fortrose			57°34′49″N 4°07′46″W	Category B	31834	Upload Photo
Academy Street Fortrose Academy	Fortrose			57°34′47″N 4°07′39″W	Category C(S)	31801	Upload Photo
Canonbury Terrace Kindeace Lodge	Fortrose			57°34′44″N 4°08′13″W	Category B	31810	Upload Photo
High Street Market Cross (Corner High Street And Academy Street	Fortrose			57°34′51″N 4°07′56″W	Category B	31829	Upload another image See more images
6 High Street (Kingarth)	Fortrose			57°34′48″N 4°08′04″W	Category C(S)	31830	Upload Photo
11 Union Street	Fortrose			57°34′51″N 4°07′44″W	Category B	31838	Upload Photo
21 And 23 High Street	Rosemarkie			57°35′28″N 4°06′55″W	Category B	31846	Upload Photo
High Street Ballmungie House	Rosemarkie			57°35′28″N 4°06′54″W	Category C(S)	31850	Upload Photo
High Street Rosemarkie Parish Church	Rosemarkie			57°35′28″N 4°06′51″W	Category B	31853	Upload another image See more images
High Street, Parish Churchyard Wall, Gates And Gatepiers	Rosemarkie			57°35′27″N 4°06′53″W	Category B	31854	Upload Photo
St Peter and St Boniface RC Church (formerly the Drill Hall and later the Mackerchar Hall), Cathedral Square	Fortrose			57°34′53″N 4°07′50″W	Category B	31816	Upload another image See more images
43 High Street	Fortrose			57°34′53″N 4°07′53″W	Category C(S)	31824	Upload Photo
45 High Street (Alexander's Bakery)	Fortrose			57°34′53″N 4°07′53″W	Category C(S)	31825	Upload Photo
Ness Road Ness House	Fortrose			57°34′54″N 4°06′45″W	Category B	31832	Upload Photo
7, 9 And 11 High Street	Rosemarkie			57°35′26″N 4°06′56″W	Category B	31845	Upload Photo
10 High Street Fyvie	Rosemarkie			57°35′26″N 4°06′55″W	Category C(S)	31857	Upload Photo
High Street, Fortrose Parish Church	Fortrose			57°34′59″N 4°07′45″W	Category B	31826	Upload another image See more images

== Key ==
The scheme for classifying buildings in Scotland is:

- Category A: "buildings of national or international importance, either architectural or historic; or fine, little-altered examples of some particular period, style or building type."
- Category B: "buildings of regional or more than local importance; or major examples of some particular period, style or building type, which may have been altered."
- Category C: "buildings of local importance; lesser examples of any period, style, or building type, as originally constructed or moderately altered; and simple traditional buildings which group well with other listed buildings."

In March 2016 there were 47,288 listed buildings in Scotland. Of these, 8% were Category A, and 50% were Category B, with the remaining 42% being Category C.

== See also ==
- List of listed buildings in Highland
