= Muir of Ord railway station =

Railway station in Highland, Scotland

Muir of Ord Scottish Gaelic: Am Blàr Dubh
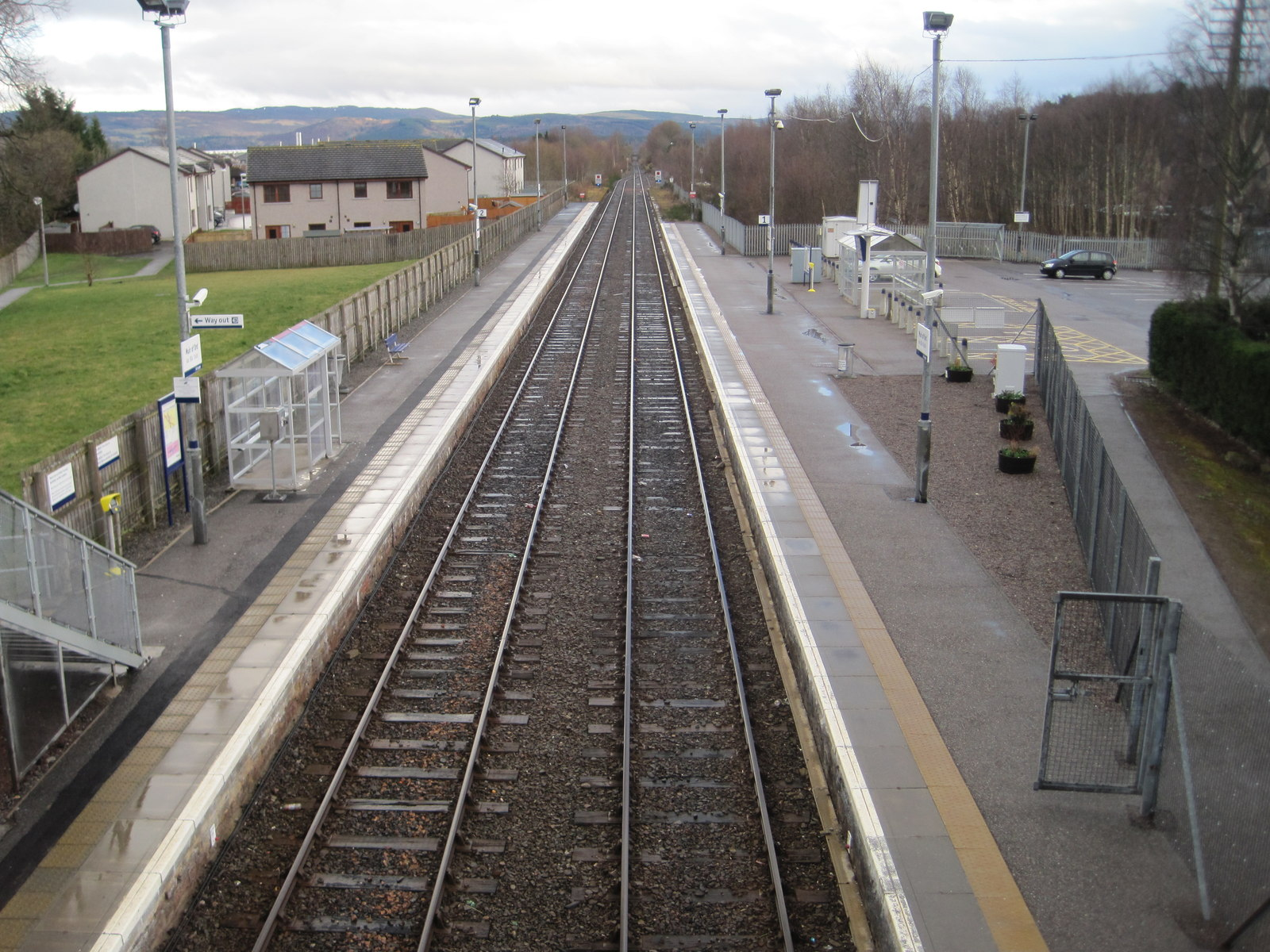
- The view south from the station in 2015

General information
- Location: Muir of Ord, Highland; Scotland
- Coordinates: 57.5175°N 4.4602°W
- Grid reference: NH527501
- Manager: ScotRail
- Platforms: 2

Other information
- Station code: MOO

History
- Original company: Inverness and Ross-shire Railway
- Pre-grouping: Highland Railway
- Post-grouping: LMS

Key dates
- 11 June 1862: Opened
- 13 June 1960: Closed
- 4 October 1976: Reopened

Passengers
- 2021/22: ▲41,230
- 2022/23: ▲47,688
- 2023/24: ▲52,306
- 2024/25: ▼46,002
- 2025/26: ▲48,062
Location
Notes
- Passenger statistics from the Office of Rail and Road

Muir of Ord railway station is a railway station on the Kyle of Lochalsh Line and the Far North Line, serving the village of Muir of Ord in the Highland council area of Scotland. The station is 13 miles 4 chains (13.05 mi; 21.0 km) from Inverness, between Beauly and Conon Bridge, and is the location of the sole remaining passing loop on the single line between Dingwall and Inverness.

== History ==
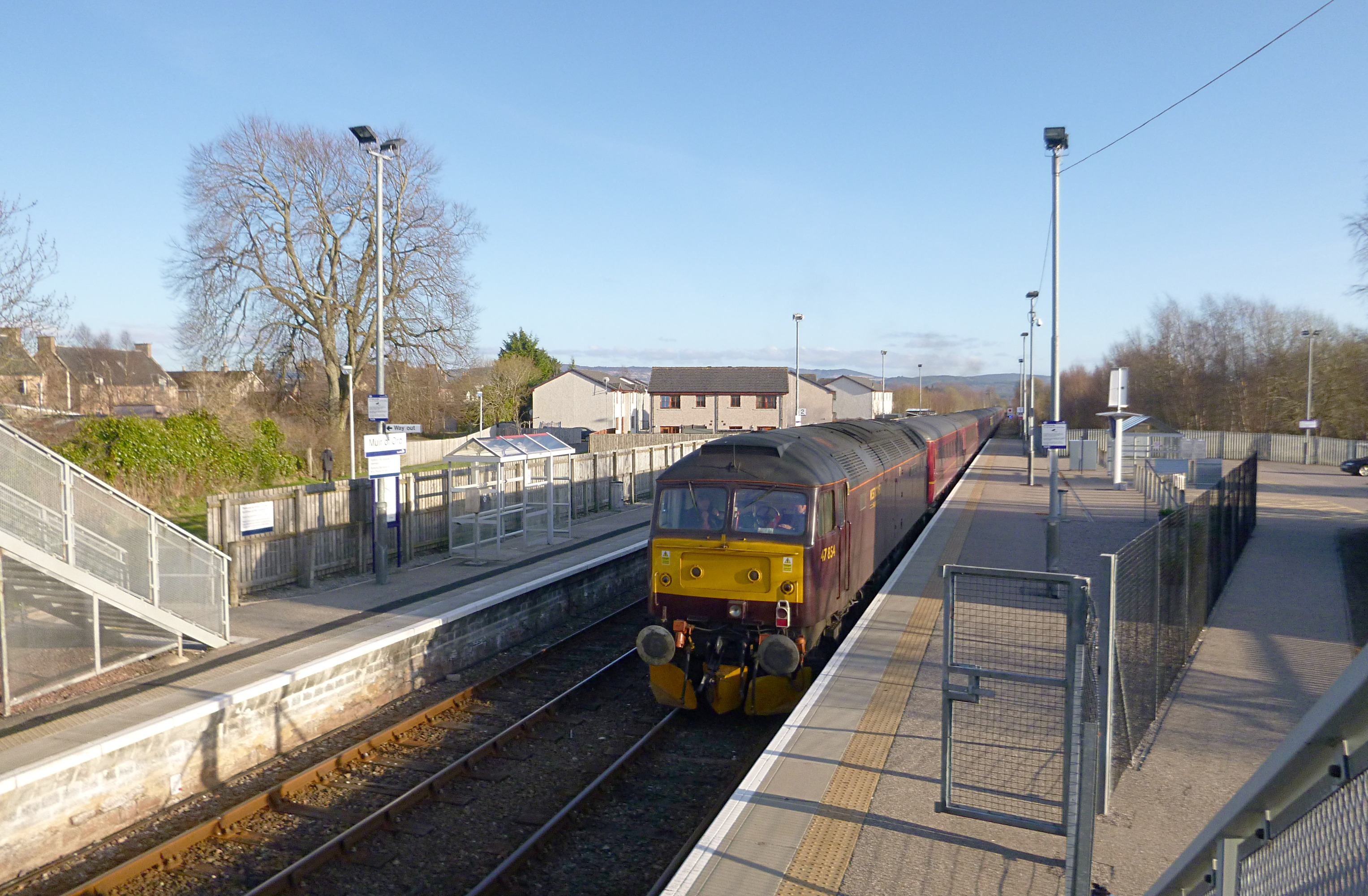
The Lochalsh Highlander, seen at Muir of Ord in 2013

Muir of Ord railway station was once the junction of a branch railway to Fortrose. The station building and platform canopy were erected in 1894, 32 years after the station itself opened. Passenger services on the branch ceased on 1 October 1951, but the branch remained open for freight until 13 June 1960. Muir of Ord station was closed on 13 June 1960 but reopened in 1976, on 4 October.

After the railway bridge across the River Ness washed away in February 1989, isolating the entire network north of Inverness, Muir of Ord was chosen as the location for a temporary depot, from which the stranded rolling stock could operate the service to the highland communities which depended on the line.

In November 2015, work commenced on a new A862 road bridge at the northern end of the station.

== Facilities ==
Both platforms have modern waiting shelters and benches, with step-free access. There is a car park and bike racks adjacent to platform 1, along with a help point near to the entrance from the car park. As there are no facilities to purchase tickets, passengers must buy one in advance, or from the guard on the train.

== Platform layout ==
The station has a passing loop 32 chains (700 yd; 640 m) long, flanked by two platforms which can each accommodate a ten-coach train.

== Passenger volume ==
Passenger Volume at Muir of Ord
	2004–05	2005–06	2006–07	2007–08	2008–09	2009–10	2010–11	2011–12	2012–13	2013–14	2014–15	2015–16	2016–17	2017–18	2018–19	2019–20	2020–21	2021–22	2022–23	2023–24	2024–25
Entries and exits	24,365	24,783	32,573	39,200	51,104	57,396	62,428	74,462	74,064	72,832	66,576	66,480	64,480	64,820	67,554	70,850	13,556	41,230	47,688	52,306	46,002

The statistics cover twelve month periods that start in April.

== Services ==
A ScotRail service at Muir of Ord with a service bound for Wick

As of the May 2026 timetable, on weekdays and Saturdays, the station sees 12 trains northbound (4 to Wick via Thurso, 4 to Kyle of Lochalsh, 1 to Dingwall, 1 to Invergordon, 1 to Ardgay and 1 to Tain), and 14 trains southbound to Inverness. On Sundays, the station sees 6 trains northbound (1 to Wick, 1 to Kyle of Lochalsh, 1 to Invergordon and 3 to Tain), and 6 trains southbound.

Preceding station	National Rail	Following station
Beauly or Inverness	ScotRail; Far North Line; Kyle of Lochalsh Line	Conon Bridge or Dingwall
	Historical railways	
Beauly	Highland Railway; Inverness and Ross-shire Railway	Conon
Terminus	Highland Railway; Fortrose Branch	Redcastle

== Bibliography ==
- Brailsford, Martyn, ed. (December 2017) [1987]. Railway Track Diagrams 1: Scotland & Isle of Man (6th ed.). Frome: Trackmaps. ISBN 978-0-9549866-9-8.
- Butt, R. V. J. (October 1995). The Directory of Railway Stations: details every public and private passenger station, halt, platform and stopping place, past and present (1st ed.). Sparkford: Patrick Stephens Ltd. ISBN 978-1-85260-508-7. OCLC 60251199. OL 11956311M.
- Jowett, Alan (March 1989). Jowett's Railway Atlas of Great Britain and Ireland: From Pre-Grouping to the Present Day (1st ed.). Sparkford: Patrick Stephens Ltd. ISBN 978-1-85260-086-0. OCLC 22311137.
- Jowett, Alan (2000). Jowett's Nationalised Railway Atlas (1st ed.). Penryn, Cornwall: Atlantic Transport Publishers. ISBN 978-0-906899-99-1. OCLC 228266687.
- Quick, Michael (2022). Railway Passenger Stations in Great Britain: A Chronology (PDF) (5th ed.). London: Railway and Canal Historical Society.
