= Fortrose =

Village in Scotland

Coordinates: 57.582°N 4.132°W

Fortrose: Scottish Gaelic: A' Chananaich
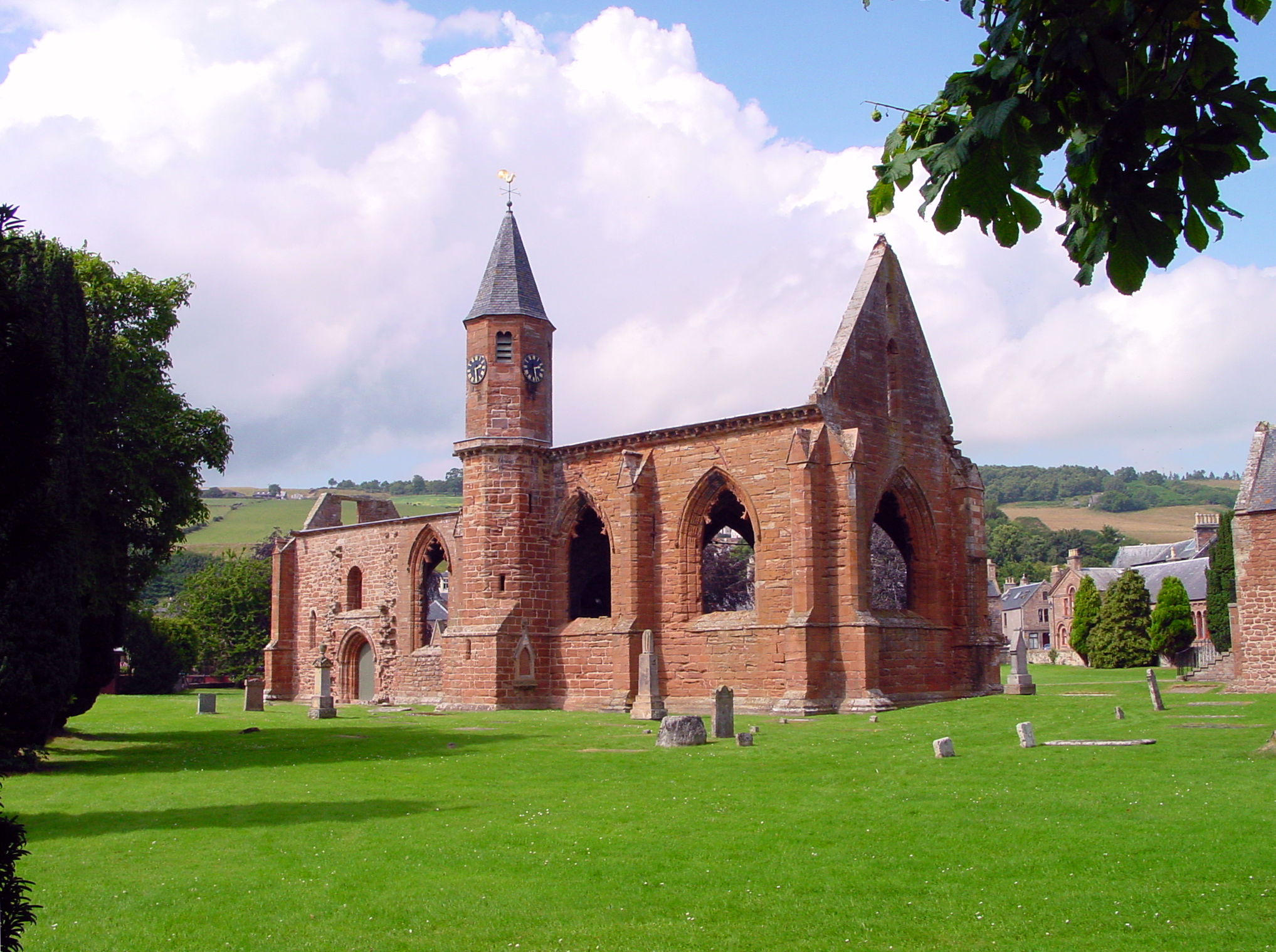
- Fortrose Cathedral

- Location within the Ross and Cromarty area
- Population: 1,680 (2020)
- OS grid reference: NH7256
  - Edinburgh: 118 mi (190 km)
  - London: 449 mi (723 km)
- Council area: Highland
- Lieutenancy area: Ross and Cromarty
- Country: Scotland
- Sovereign state: United Kingdom
- Post town: FORTROSE
- Postcode district: IV10
- Dialling code: 01381
- Police: Scotland
- Fire: Scottish
- Ambulance: Scottish
- UK Parliament: Caithness, Sutherland and Easter Ross
- Scottish Parliament: Skye, Lochaber and Badenoch

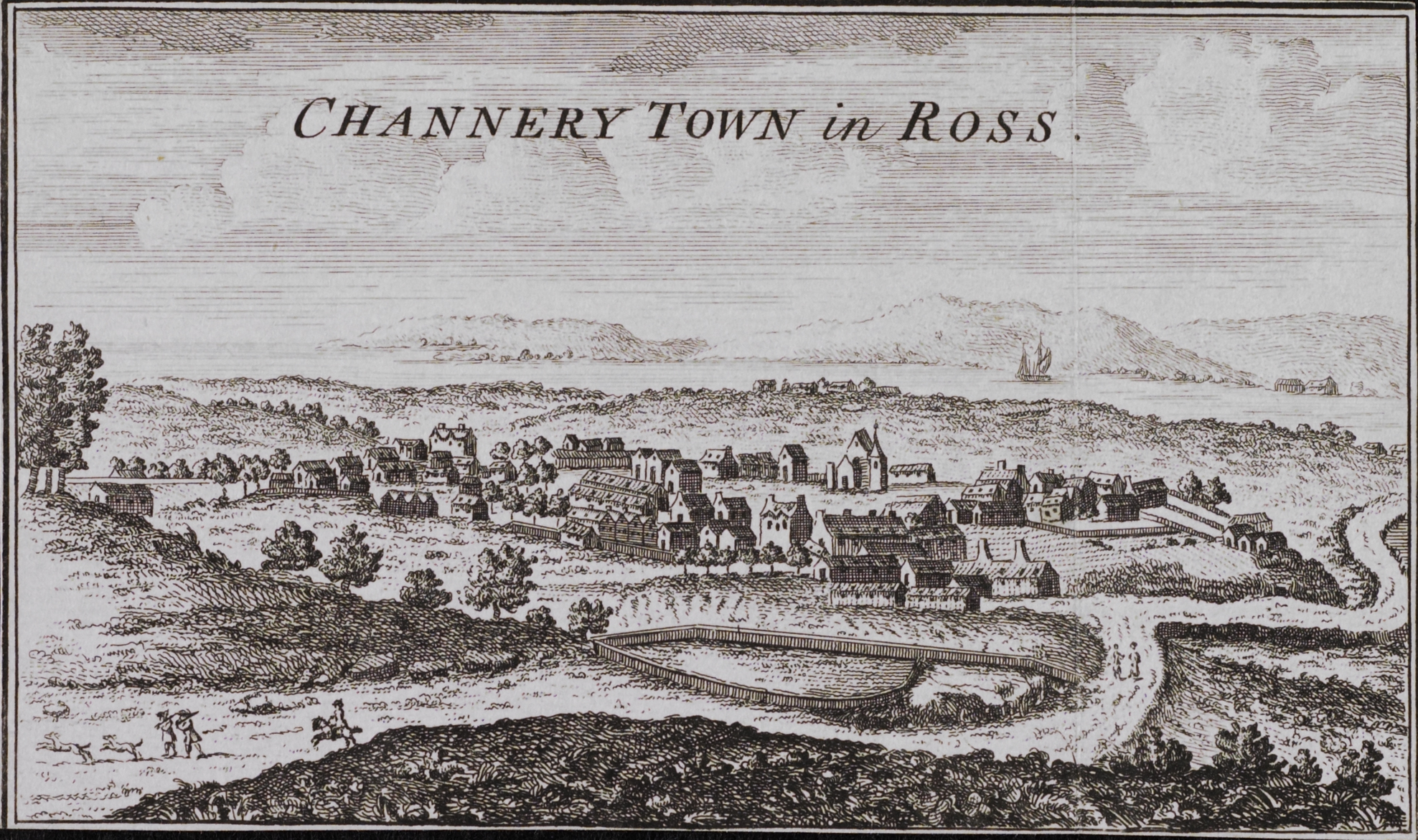
18th-century view of Fortrose ("Channery")

Fortrose is a town and former royal burgh on the Black Isle in the Highland council area of Scotland, about six miles (ten kilometres) northeast of Inverness. The town is known for its ruined 13th-century cathedral, and as the home of the Brahan Seer. Chanonry Point, a nearby headland projecting into the Moray Firth, is a popular location for dolphin spotting.

== Names ==
Fortrose was historically known as the Chanonry of Ross, as it was where the canons of Fortrose Cathedral made their homes. It is still known in Gaelic as A' Chananaich, meaning "place of canons".

The origin of the name Fortrose is uncertain. One possibility is that it came from nearby Chanonry Point and originally meant the headland (ros) of the Fortriu, a local ethonym. Compare the etymology of Montrose in Angus. The locals pronounce the name /ˈfɔːrtroʊz/, with the stress on the first syllable.

== History ==
Archaeological investigations, by Headland Archaeology, in 2013, as part of a planning condition for the creation of a housing development found domestic activity dating from the Neolithic to the Early Bronze Age. There was evidence of cereal production and the gathering of wild resources. The archaeologists also found that funerary practices change on the peninsula during that time from stone cist burials to cremation burials.

In the Middle Ages it was the seat of the bishopric of Ross, and formerly called Chanonry, for being the Chanory of Ross. Fortrose owes its origins to the decision by Bishop Robert in the 13th century to build a new Cathedral of Ross there. This was to replace the Church of St Peter in nearby Rosemarkie. The cathedral was largely demolished in the mid-seventeenth century by Oliver Cromwell to provide building materials for a citadel at Inverness. The vaulted south aisle, with bell-tower, and a detached chapter house (used as the tollbooth of Fortrose after the Reformation) remain. These fragments, though modest in scale, display considerable architectural refinement, and are in the care of Historic Scotland (no entrance charge).

Fortrose was a parliamentary burgh, combined with Inverness, Forres and Nairn, in the Inverness Burghs constituency of the House of Commons of the Parliament of Great Britain from 1708 to 1801 and of the Parliament of the United Kingdom from 1801 to 1918. The constituency was abolished in 1918 and the Fortrose component was merged into the then new constituency of Ross and Cromarty.

== Fortrose Academy ==
Fortrose Academy is the only secondary school on the Black Isle. It feeds in pupils from the respective primary schools of Avoch, Cromarty, Culbokie, Munlochy, North Kessock, Resolis, and Tore. There are around 640 pupils enrolled. Notable former teachers include Brian Johnston, who taught English, and Mr A. Tait, who won the Teacher of the Year Award in Scotland, 2006. The previous rector of the school is Jacquie Ross. Former pupils include the poet Colin Bramwell. The School was at the place of multiple scandals involving the now disgraced John Ross for inappropriate actions with a minor.

== Fortrose Library ==
Built into the school is Fortrose library, which is part of the Highland Libraries group. The library is regularly used by pupils in Fortrose Academy, for which the younger years take out books to participate in the "power readers" scheme, which involves pupils getting rewards for reading a certain number of books, and passing on to the next level. Due to the library's small size, the stock is always changing.

== Black Isle Leisure Centre ==
Situated next to the school is the Black Isle Leisure Centre. It consists of a gym, and one single indoor court which has space for four badminton courts, four small basketball courts or one full sized basketball court. It also has goals at either end for football. Pupils of Fortrose Academy regularly have PE lessons in the Leisure Centre.

== Transport ==
The A832 runs through the town.

There is a bus service from Inverness that runs half-hourly weekdays (with a few gaps for schools traffic). The buses continue hourly to Cromarty.

There was a railway station at Fortrose, which closed in 1951. The line it was situated on closed in 1960.

== People from Fortrose ==
- Eliza Junor
