= Kenneth William Junor =

Canadian World War I flying ace

- Born: August 3, 1896; Toronto, Ontario, Canada
- Died: April 23, 1918 (aged 21); Bray-sur-Somme, France
- Burial place: Pas de Calais, France
- Military career
- Allegiance: Canada; United Kingdom
- Branch: Canadian Expeditionary Force; Royal Flying Corps
- Service years: 1915–1918
- Rank: Captain
- Units: 4th Mounted Rifles; 9th Mounted Horse; 75th (Mississauga) Battalion, CEF; Canadian Machine Gun Corps; No. 56 Squadron RAF
- Awards: Military Cross

Captain Kenneth William Junor MC (August 3, 1896 – April 23, 1918) was a Canadian flying ace during World War I. He was credited with eight confirmed victories.

He began his service in mounted infantry and transferred to a machine gun unit. He was entrusted with a commission while still only 19 years old. He then transferred to the Royal Flying Corps, where his courage won him a Military Cross, awarded him on the day he was killed in action.

== Early life ==
Kenneth William Junor was the son of Alice E. and William Junor. The younger Junor was born on 3 August 1896 in Toronto, Ontario, Canada. He served in the 4th Mounted Rifles of the militia prior to enlisting into the Canadian Expeditionary Force on 24 July 1915 to serve in the First World War. At the time of his enlistment as a private into the 75th (Mississauga) Battalion, CEF, he was a third year student at Toronto University serving in the 9th Mounted Horse of the militia. The annotation on his enlistment papers that he was being recruited as an officer seems to indicate he was already being considered for a commission. His physical examination noted that he was 5 feet 8 1/2 inches tall, fair complected, with brown hair and blue eyes.

== World War I ==
In March 1916, Junor was shipped to England as a lieutenant in the 11th Machine Gun Company of the Canadian Machine Gun Corps. In July 1916, he was forwarded to serve on the Western Front. He served during the Battle of the Somme, and was stricken with fever.

After his recovery, he was seconded to the Royal Flying Corps, on 28 July 1917. In December 1917, after training, he was posted to No. 56 Squadron as a Royal Aircraft Factory SE.5a pilot. Between 29 January and 20 April 1918, using planes he dubbed Bubbly Kid and Bubbly Kid II, he would set two German aircraft afire in midair, destroy three others, and drive down three more down out of control.

On 23 April 1918, Junor fell victim to German ace Egon Koepsch of Jagdstaffel 4, who shot him down at Bray-sur-Somme. Kenneth William Junor is buried in an unidentified plot in Faubourg-d'Amiens Cemetery, as well as memorialized on the Arras Flying Services Memorial.

Kenneth William Junor was awarded the Military Cross for valour on the very day he was killed in action; however, it was gazetted posthumously on 13 May 1918. The award citation gives an incomplete description of his aerial career:

For conspicuous gallantry and devotion to duty in aerial fighting. He destroyed two enemy machines and drove down two others out of control, which crashed on landing. He always showed the greatest courage, skill and resource.
