= Eliza Junor =

- Born: 1804; Demerara
- Died: 20 April 1861
- Children: 1

Eliza Junor (c. 1804–20 April 1861) was a Scotswoman of mixed race, who was the daughter of a former slave owner, Hugh Junor, and a slave or former slave ("free coloured woman") whose name is not recorded.

== Life ==
Junor and her brother William were born in Demerara in the British colony of Guyana, where their father owned a timber estate with sixty enslaved people. In 1816, Hugh Junor returned with his children, though apparently not with their mother, to his native Scotland and settled in Fortrose, on the Black Isle, and had both children baptised at Rosemarkie. Her father died in 1823 and bequeathed his estate in Essequibo to his legitimate son Colin; his widow remarried and named one of her sons Hugh Junor Browne in honour of her first husband.

Junor went to school in Fortrose and won prizes for penmanship. She later lived in Edinburgh and Brixton, London, where she worked as a governess. She never married but had one daughter, Emma McGregor, who was baptised at St George Middlesex in 1838. She returned to Fortrose in the 1850s. Her brother William married a woman from Glasgow and emigrated to Argentina as a missionary for the Methodist Church. Junor died on 20 April 1861 and is buried in Rosemarkie churchyard.

== Legacy ==
Junor has attracted interest as an example of a black woman living in Scotland and England in the 19th century. Her life was researched by historian David Alston, and has been made into a short film in Gaelic by Fèisean nan Gàidheal, Eliza, with the title role played by Edinburgh-based actor Tawana Maramba. A song "Òran Eliza" was composed by Eilidh Mackenzie.

In October 2020, Fortrose Academy held the first Eliza Junor Penmanship Competition, to mark Black History Month.
