= Robert Junor =

Australian cricketer

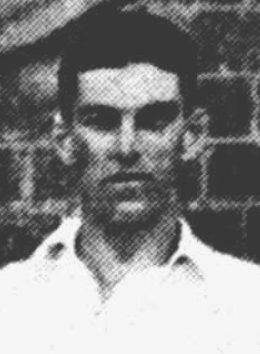

Personal information
- Born: 10 January 1888; Melbourne, Australia
- Died: 26 July 1957 (aged 69); Melbourne, Australia

Domestic team information
- Years: Team
- 1915: Victoria
- Source: Cricinfo, 18 November 2015

Robert Junor (10 January 1888 – 26 July 1957) was an Australian cricketer. He played one first-class cricket match for Victoria in 1915.

== See also ==
- List of Victoria first-class cricketers
