= Maryburgh =

Coordinates: 57.57538°N 4.44290°W

Maryburgh: Scottish Gaelic: Baile Màiri
- Location within the Ross and Cromarty area
- Population: 1,090 (2020)
- OS grid reference: NH540562
- Council area: Highland
- Country: Scotland
- Sovereign state: United Kingdom
- Post town: Dingwall
- Postcode district: IV7 8
- Dialling code: 01349
- Police: Scotland
- Fire: Scottish
- Ambulance: Scottish
- UK Parliament: Ross, Skye and Lochaber
- Scottish Parliament: Skye, Lochaber and Badenoch

Maryburgh (Scottish Gaelic: Baile Màiri) is a village in the Highland council area of Scotland, 2 miles (3.2 km) south of Dingwall. It is situated on the northern bank of the River Conon. The village of Conon Bridge is on the other side of the river.

== Amenities ==
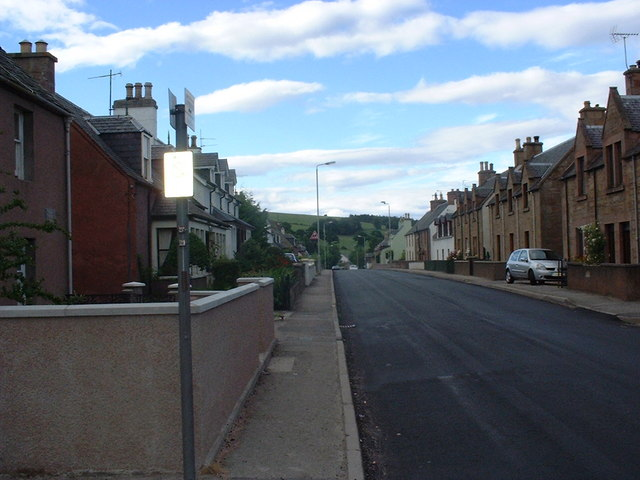
Proby Street, Maryburgh photographed in July, 2006

Maryburgh has a number of amenities within its bounds. There is a small shop and community centre. There is also two playgrounds and a large football field. The community council publishes a magazine for the community, titled the Maryburgh Roundabout.

In addition, Maryburgh Free Church holds services in their building, built in 1841. The community is found within the Church of Scotland parish of Ferintosh, with their church premises located in Conon Bridge.

== See also ==
- Maryburgh is also an antiquated name for Fort William. Maryburgh is also a hamlet of 10 house about 5 miles (8.0 km) south of Kinross, postcode KY4 0JE.
