= Beauly railway station =

Railway station in Scottish Highlands

Beauly Scottish Gaelic: A' Mhanachainn
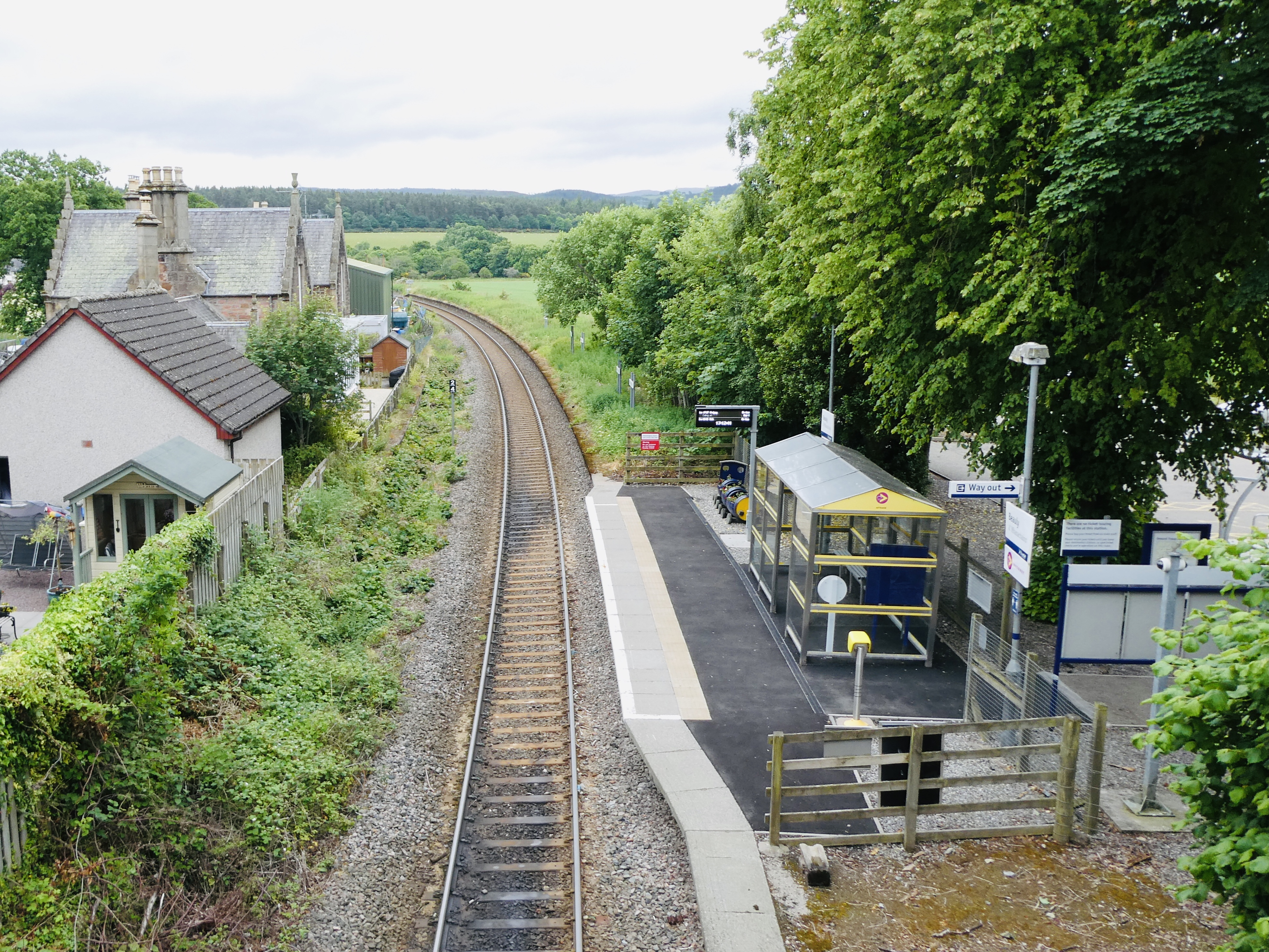
- The short platform at Beauly, looking southeast

General information
- Location: Beauly, Highland; Scotland
- Coordinates: 57.4783°N 4.4699°W
- Grid reference: NH520457
- Manager: ScotRail
- Platforms: 1

Other information
- Station code: BEL

History
- Original company: Inverness and Ross-shire Railway
- Pre-grouping: Highland Railway
- Post-grouping: London, Midland and Scottish Railway

Key dates
- 11 June 1862: Opened
- 13 June 1960: Closed
- 15 April 2002: Reopened

Passengers
- 2021/22: ▲30,178
- 2022/23: ▲36,588
- 2023/24: ▲38,376
- 2024/25: ▼33,508
- 2025/26: ▼31,788
Location
Notes
- Passenger statistics from the Office of Rail and Road

Beauly railway station serves the village of Beauly, in the Highland council area of Scotland. Located on the Far North Line, it is 10 miles 12 chains (16.3 km) down the line from Inverness, and is the first intermediate station on the line, before reaching Muir of Ord. ScotRail manages the station and operates all services.

== History ==
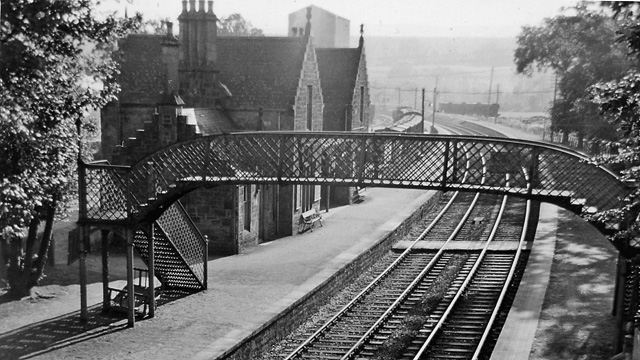
Beauly station in 1961

The Inverness and Ross-shire Railway, which was to be a line between Inverness and Invergordon, was authorised in 1860, and opened in stages. The first section, between Inverness and Dingwall, opened on 11 June 1862, and Beauly was one of the stations built for the original line. It had two platforms, a passing loop and a goods shed with sidings that was equipped with a 1½-ton crane. The station was host to an LMS caravan from 1936 to 1939.

The station closed nearly a century later, on 13 June 1960, along with all other stations between Inverness and Dingwall. This was due to increasing competition from motorbuses, particularly those of Highland Omnibuses Ltd.

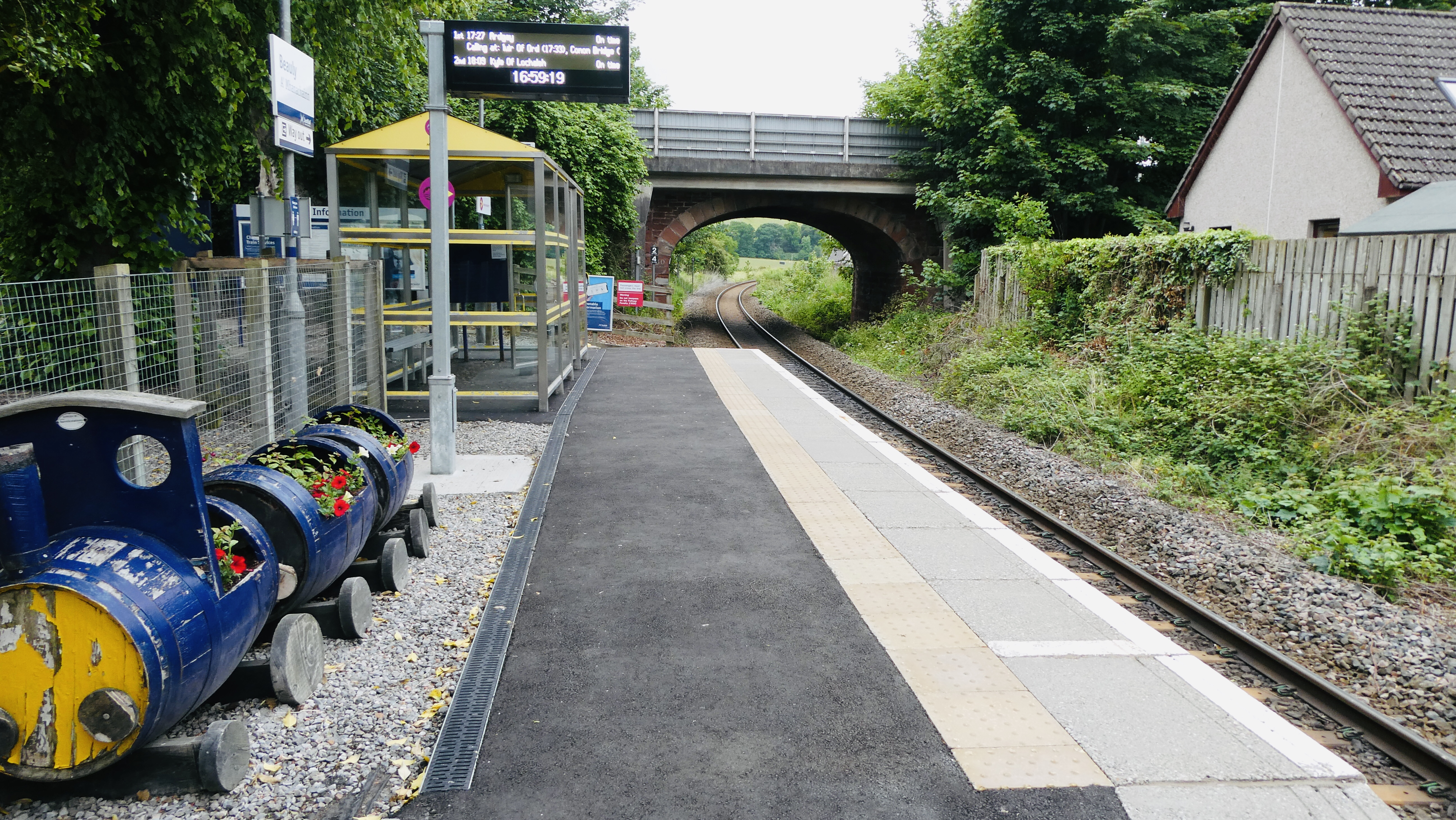
The platform, looking northwest

Following a local campaign, the station was reopened on 15 April 2002. A new single platform, shelter and car park were built in a £250,000 project. The platform is the shortest in Great Britain: at the length of 15.06 metres (49 ft 5 in), it is shorter than a single carriage of a Class 158 train that is usually used on this line. The platform's length only allows for a single door on the train to be opened. It is the shortest station in the United Kingdom.

== Facilities ==
There is a small car park at the station, in which there are cycle racks and lockers. On the platform, there is a modern waiting shelter, in which there is a payphone. As there are no facilities to purchase tickets, passengers must buy one in advance, or from the guard on the train.

== Passenger volume ==
Passenger Volume at Beauly
Period	Entries & Exits
2004-05	26,616
2005-06	28,384
2006-07	35,860
2007-08	41,578
2008-09	52,422
2009-10	51,094
2010-11	49,858
2011-12	54,536
2012-13	55,236
2013-14	57,946
2014-15	57,446
2015-16	59,406
2016-17	52,870
2017-18	51,522
2018-19	48,270
2019-20	46,510
2020-21	14,918
2021-22	30,718
2022-23	36,588
2023-24	38,376
2024-25	33,508

The statistics cover twelve month periods that start in April.

== Services ==
ScotRail Class 158 arrives with a service to Kyle of Lochalsh

As of the May 2026 timetable, on weekdays and Saturdays, the station sees 11 trains northbound (3 to Wick via Thurso, 4 to Kyle of Lochalsh, 1 to Dingwall, 1 to Invergordon, 1 to Ardgay and 1 to Tain), and 13 trains southbound to Inverness. On Sundays, the station sees 6 trains northbound (1 to Wick, 1 to Kyle of Lochalsh, 1 to Invergordon and 3 to Tain), and 7 trains southbound.

Preceding station	National Rail	Following station
Inverness	ScotRail; Kyle of Lochalsh Line; Far North Line	Muir of Ord
	Historical railways	
Clunes; Line open, station closed	Highland Railway; Inverness and Ross-shire Railway	Muir of Ord; Line and station open

== Bibliography ==
- Butt, R. V. J. (1995). The Directory of Railway Stations. Yeovil: Patrick Stephens Ltd. ISBN 1-85260-508-1. R508
- McRae, Andrew (1997). British Railway Camping Coach Holidays: The 1930s & British Railways (London Midland Region). Foxline.
- Quick, Michael (2022). Railway Passenger Stations in Great Britain: A Chronology (PDF) (5th ed.). London: Railway and Canal Historical Society. Archived from the original (PDF) on 15 March 2023.
- Vallance, H. A.; Clinker, C.R.; Lambert, Anthony J. (1985). The Highland Railway (4th ed.). Newton Abbot: David & Charles. ISBN 0-946537-24-0.
