= Fortrose Branch =

Railway line in Scotland

Overview
- Locale: Scotland
- Dates of operation: 1 February 1894–31 December 1922
- Successor: London Midland and Scottish Railway

Technical
- Track gauge: 4 ft 8 1/2 in (1,435 mm)
- Length: 7 3/4 mi (12.5 km)
Route map
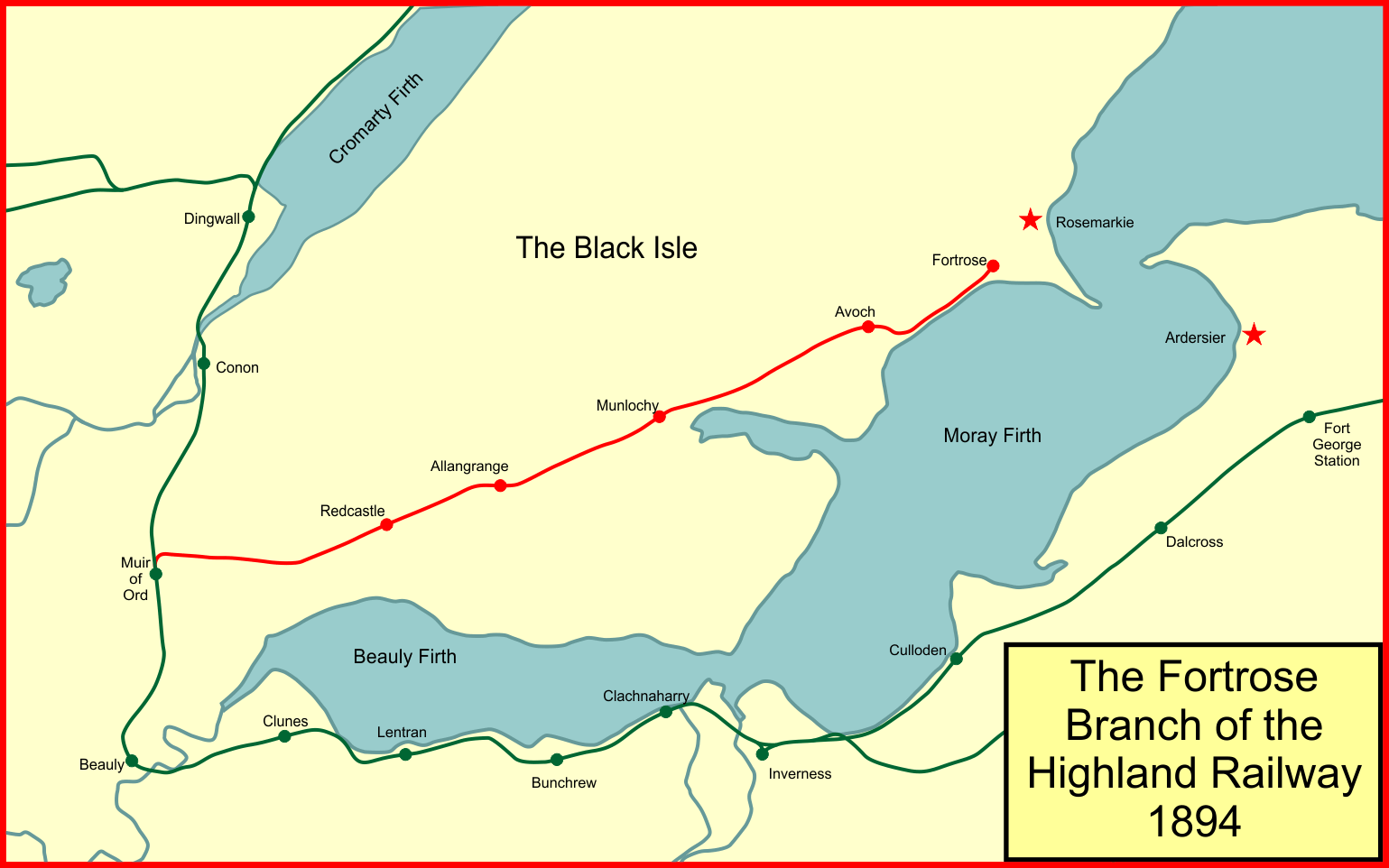

The Fortrose Branch, also known as the Black Isle Railway, was a railway branch line serving Fortrose in the Black Isle, in the north of Scotland. It was built by the Highland Railway as a tactical measure to exclude a rival railway company and to move the locals from Fortrose onwards to other destinations.

It opened in 1894, making a junction with the Far North Railway Line at Muir of Ord. Serving an agricultural and coastal area, it was never commercially successful and in 1951 the passenger service was withdrawn. A goods train service continued, but it too closed in 1960. There is now no railway use of the former line.

== History ==
The Highland Railway was established in 1865 and became dominant in the area of Scotland between Perth, Inverness and north and west of there.

The relatively thin population density in its area of influence meant that great profitability was not available to the company, and it fought strenuously to retain dominance in the area that it considered belonged to it alone. It operated the Far North Railway Line from Inverness to Wick and Thurso, but the difficult geography meant that the line formed a wide sweep round the western end of the Black Isle, to avoid crossing the Beauly Firth and the Cromarty Firth.

The Highland Railway was surprised when in 1889 the Great North of Scotland Railway (GNoSR) proposed the construction of a railway to Fortrose, a town on the Black Isle located on the coast of the Moray Firth opposite Fort George. The GNoSR operated a network from Aberdeen and the nearest place to Inverness served by it was at Elgin, some distance away. The branch would have been detached from the owning railway, but running through the Black Isle it would have made a junction with the Highland Railway at Muir of Ord. A ferry operation from Fortrose to Ardersier, on the south side of the Moray, was included in the plans. Ardersier was then known as Campbelltown, and a railway branch to it was included. Two other schemes striking into Highland territory were proposed at the same time, elevating Highland Railway discomfort about its competitive position.

The two companies had been adversaries for some time, and in 1883 and the following years there had been a state of continual warfare over junctions, frontiers and running powers.

The Highland saw at once that if this branch were built, it would be easy for the GNoSR to demand running powers into Inverness to reach its branch, and in that way the rival company would have gained access to the Highland's stronghold.

The Highland Railway began preparing its opposition to the GNoSR when the latter wrote proposing a "solution" to the "problem": that the GNoS should simply be given running powers for its Aberdeen trains into Inverness.

This startlingly bold proposition confirmed the Highland Railway's fears, and the Highland Railway decided to respond to the tactical attack with its own tactical response: it wrote back proposing that the two companies should consider merging, and that meanwhile the proposed new lines, and any running powers, should be held off until the merger was negotiated.

The GNoSR was not to be deterred by this obvious stalling tactic and it went ahead with its parliamentary bill. The Highland Railway immediately presented its own bill for a Fortrose branch from Muir of Ord and extending a short distance beyond Fortrose to Rosemarkie, and also a branch to Ardersier, south of Beauly Firth. It was the Highland Railway's Bill that was approved in Parliament, with the Highland Railway (New Lines) Act 1890 (53 & 54 Vict. c. lxi) gaining royal assent on 4 July 1890, and the GNoSR withdrew its bill.

The Highland Railway wasted no time in starting construction, which it did on 19 November 1890. The extension to Rosemarkie was omitted, and the branch was to be 13 miles long. Construction was not swift, and finally it opened for traffic on 1 February 1894, with four intermediate stations. The construction had cost £57,560. The line was worked on the "one engine in steam" principle, and there were seven trains each way daily, of which four were mixed. Two of the mixed trains were eliminated in 1897. None of the trains on the branch ran through beyond the Muir of Ord junction station; and the journey took 45 to 50 minutes.

A second railway on the Black Isle was authorised as the Cromarty and Dingwall Light Railway under a light railway order, the Cromarty and Dingwall Light Railway Order 1902, of 1 August 1902. It was to run from Conon, on the Inverness to Dingwall main line, to Cromarty. There were serious difficulties in obtaining possession of the land at the Conon end, and money was desperately short, so that construction was delayed. Six miles of track had been laid by the outbreak of war in 1914, but the outbreak of hostilities and the demand for track materials in the war zone resulted in the track being removed, and the project was never completed, and the proposed line was abandoned.

A private station was opened at Rosehaugh, serving the residence of James Douglas Fletcher, a director of the Highland Railway. The halt was open by 1905.

The quiet branch line continued with little change in the twentieth century, while the Highland Railway was made a constituent of the new London, Midland and Scottish Railway (LMS) in the "grouping" of the railways in 1923, following the Railways Act 1921.

The difficult terrain of the Black Isle made it especially susceptible to competition from road transport for both passenger and goods traffic. The line continue into the British Railways era after nationalisation in 1948 but passenger traffic was closed from 1 October 1951. A particular issue for passenger traffic was that access from the branch to the county town of Dingwall always involved a change of train at Dingwall. Goods trains continued running for the time being, but they too were unable to compete with the greater flexibility and lower operating cost of road transport, and the goods service closed on 13 June 1960. The line closed completely and the track was subsequently removed.

== Station list ==
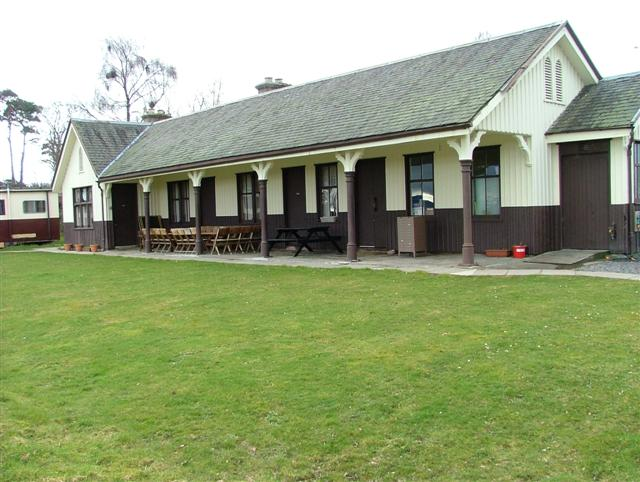
Redcastle station, 2007

- Muir of Ord; junction on main line;
- Redcastle;
- Allangrange;
- Munlochy;
- Rosehaugh; private station for Rosehaugh House; opened by 1905.
- Avoch;
- Fortrose.

The line opened on 1 February 1894 and closed to passengers on 1 October 1951, and completely on 13 June 1960.

== See also ==
History of the Far North of Scotland Railway Line
